= Aquarius in Chinese astronomy =

According to traditional Chinese uranography, the modern constellation Aquarius is located within the northern quadrant of the sky, which is symbolized as the Black Tortoise of the North (北方玄武, Běi Fāng Xuán Wǔ).

The name of the western constellation in modern Chinese is 寶瓶座 (bǎo píng zuò), meaning "the precious pitcher constellation".

== Stars ==
The map of Chinese constellation in constellation Aquarius area consists of:

Four Symbols	Mansion (Chinese name)	Romanization	Translation	Asterisms (Chinese name)	Romanization	Translation	Western star name	Proper Name	Chinese star name	Romanization	Translation
Black Tortoise of the North (北方玄武)	女	Nǚ	Girl	女	Nǚ	Girl					
Black Tortoise of the North (北方玄武)	女	Nǚ	Girl	女	Nǚ	Girl	ε Aqr	Albali			
Black Tortoise of the North (北方玄武)	女	Nǚ	Girl	女	Nǚ	Girl	ε Aqr	Albali	女宿一	Nǚsùyī	1st star
Black Tortoise of the North (北方玄武)	女	Nǚ	Girl	女	Nǚ	Girl	ε Aqr	Albali	女宿距星	Nǚsùjùxīng	Separated star
Black Tortoise of the North (北方玄武)	女	Nǚ	Girl	女	Nǚ	Girl	ε Aqr	Albali	女宿西南星	Nǚsùxīnánxīng	Southwestern star
Black Tortoise of the North (北方玄武)	女	Nǚ	Girl	女	Nǚ	Girl	μ Aqr		女宿二	Nǚsùèr	2nd star
Black Tortoise of the North (北方玄武)	女	Nǚ	Girl	女	Nǚ	Girl	4 Aqr		女宿三	Nǚsùsān	3rd star
Black Tortoise of the North (北方玄武)	女	Nǚ	Girl	女	Nǚ	Girl	3 Aqr		女宿四	Nǚsùsì	4th star
Black Tortoise of the North (北方玄武)	女	Nǚ	Girl	女	Nǚ	Girl	5 Aqr		女宿增一	Nǚsùzēngyī	1st additional star
Black Tortoise of the North (北方玄武)	女	Nǚ	Girl	女	Nǚ	Girl	11 Aqr		女宿增二	Nǚsùzēngèr	2nd additional star
Black Tortoise of the North (北方玄武)	女	Nǚ	Girl	女	Nǚ	Girl	10 Aqr		女宿增三	Nǚsùzēngsān	3rd additional star
Black Tortoise of the North (北方玄武)	女	Nǚ	Girl	女	Nǚ	Girl	12 Aqr		女宿增四	Nǚsùzēngsì	4th additional star
Black Tortoise of the North (北方玄武)	女	Nǚ	Girl	女	Nǚ	Girl	7 Aqr		女宿增五	Nǚsùzēngwǔ	5th additional star
Black Tortoise of the North (北方玄武)	女	Nǚ	Girl	離珠	Lízhū	Pearls on Ladies' Wear	1 Aqr		離珠三	Lízhūsān	3rd star
Black Tortoise of the North (北方玄武)	虛	Xū	Emptiness	虛	Xū	Emptiness					
Black Tortoise of the North (北方玄武)	虛	Xū	Emptiness	虛	Xū	Emptiness	β Aqr	Sadalsuud			
Black Tortoise of the North (北方玄武)	虛	Xū	Emptiness	虛	Xū	Emptiness	β Aqr	Sadalsuud	虚宿一	Xūsùyī	1st star
Black Tortoise of the North (北方玄武)	虛	Xū	Emptiness	虛	Xū	Emptiness	β Aqr	Sadalsuud	虚宿距星	Xūsùjùxīng	Separated star
Black Tortoise of the North (北方玄武)	虛	Xū	Emptiness	虛	Xū	Emptiness	β Aqr	Sadalsuud	虚宿南星	Xūsùnánxīng	Southern star
Black Tortoise of the North (北方玄武)	虛	Xū	Emptiness	虛	Xū	Emptiness	15 Aqr		虚宿增五	Xūsùzēngwǔ	5th additional star
Black Tortoise of the North (北方玄武)	虛	Xū	Emptiness	虛	Xū	Emptiness	16 Aqr		虚宿增六	Xūsùzēngliù	6th additional star
Black Tortoise of the North (北方玄武)	虛	Xū	Emptiness	虛	Xū	Emptiness	21 Aqr		虚宿增七	Xūsùzēngqī	7th additional star
Black Tortoise of the North (北方玄武)	虛	Xū	Emptiness	虛	Xū	Emptiness	20 Aqr		虚宿增八	Xūsùzēngbā	8th additional star
Black Tortoise of the North (北方玄武)	虛	Xū	Emptiness	司命	Sīmìng	Deified Judge of Life					
Black Tortoise of the North (北方玄武)	虛	Xū	Emptiness	司命	Sīmìng	Deified Judge of Life	24 Aqr		司命一	Sīmìngyī	1st star
Black Tortoise of the North (北方玄武)	虛	Xū	Emptiness	司命	Sīmìng	Deified Judge of Life	26 Aqr		司命二	Sīmìngèr	2nd star
Black Tortoise of the North (北方玄武)	虛	Xū	Emptiness	司祿	Sīlù	Deified Judge of Rank	25 Aqr		司祿二	Sīlùèr	2nd star
Black Tortoise of the North (北方玄武)	虛	Xū	Emptiness	哭	Kū	Crying					
Black Tortoise of the North (北方玄武)	虛	Xū	Emptiness	哭	Kū	Crying	38 Aqr		哭二	Kūèr	2nd star
Black Tortoise of the North (北方玄武)	虛	Xū	Emptiness	哭	Kū	Crying	37 Aqr		哭增四	Kūzēngsì	4th addition star
Black Tortoise of the North (北方玄武)	虛	Xū	Emptiness	泣	Qì	Weeping					
Black Tortoise of the North (北方玄武)	虛	Xū	Emptiness	泣	Qì	Weeping	ρ Aqr		泣一	Qìyī	1st star
Black Tortoise of the North (北方玄武)	虛	Xū	Emptiness	泣	Qì	Weeping	θ Aqr	Ancha	泣二	Qìèr	2nd star
Black Tortoise of the North (北方玄武)	虛	Xū	Emptiness	泣	Qì	Weeping	30 Aqr		泣增一	Qìzēngyī	1st additional star
Black Tortoise of the North (北方玄武)	虛	Xū	Emptiness	泣	Qì	Weeping	36 Aqr		泣增二	Qìzēngèr	2nd additional star
Black Tortoise of the North (北方玄武)	虛	Xū	Emptiness	天壘城	Tiānlěichéng	Celestial Ramparts					
Black Tortoise of the North (北方玄武)	虛	Xū	Emptiness	天壘城	Tiānlěichéng	Celestial Ramparts	ξ Aqr	Bunda (for component A)	天壘城一	Tiānlěichéngyī	1st star
Black Tortoise of the North (北方玄武)	虛	Xū	Emptiness	天壘城	Tiānlěichéng	Celestial Ramparts	18 Aqr		天壘城六	Tiānlěichéngliù	6th star
Black Tortoise of the North (北方玄武)	虛	Xū	Emptiness	天壘城	Tiānlěichéng	Celestial Ramparts	9 Aqr		天壘城八	Tiānlěichéngbā	8th star
Black Tortoise of the North (北方玄武)	虛	Xū	Emptiness	天壘城	Tiānlěichéng	Celestial Ramparts	8 Aqr		天壘城九	Tiānlěichéngjiǔ	9th star
Black Tortoise of the North (北方玄武)	虛	Xū	Emptiness	天壘城	Tiānlěichéng	Celestial Ramparts	ν Aqr		天壘城十	Tiānlěichéngshí	10th star
Black Tortoise of the North (北方玄武)	虛	Xū	Emptiness	天壘城	Tiānlěichéng	Celestial Ramparts	14 Aqr		天壘城十一	Tiānlěichéngshíyī	11th star
Black Tortoise of the North (北方玄武)	虛	Xū	Emptiness	天壘城	Tiānlěichéng	Celestial Ramparts	17 Aqr		天壘城十二	Tiānlěichéngshíèr	12th star
Black Tortoise of the North (北方玄武)	虛	Xū	Emptiness	天壘城	Tiānlěichéng	Celestial Ramparts	19 Aqr		天壘城十三	Tiānlěichéngshísān	13th star
Black Tortoise of the North (北方玄武)	危	Wēi	Rooftop	危	Wēi	Rooftop					
Black Tortoise of the North (北方玄武)	危	Wēi	Rooftop	危	Wēi	Rooftop	α Aqr	Sadalmelik			
Black Tortoise of the North (北方玄武)	危	Wēi	Rooftop	危	Wēi	Rooftop	α Aqr	Sadalmelik	危宿一	Wēisùyī	1st star
Black Tortoise of the North (北方玄武)	危	Wēi	Rooftop	危	Wēi	Rooftop	α Aqr	Sadalmelik	危宿距星	Wēisùjùxīng	Separated star
Black Tortoise of the North (北方玄武)	危	Wēi	Rooftop	危	Wēi	Rooftop	α Aqr	Sadalmelik	危宿南星	Wēisùnánxīng	Southern star
Black Tortoise of the North (北方玄武)	危	Wēi	Rooftop	危	Wēi	Rooftop	28 Aqr		危宿增四	Wēisùzēngsì	4th additional star
Black Tortoise of the North (北方玄武)	危	Wēi	Rooftop	墳墓	Fénmù	Tomb					
Black Tortoise of the North (北方玄武)	危	Wēi	Rooftop	墳墓	Fénmù	Tomb	ζ^{1} Aqr and ζ^{2} Aqr		墳墓一	Fénmùyī	1st star
Black Tortoise of the North (北方玄武)	危	Wēi	Rooftop	墳墓	Fénmù	Tomb	γ Aqr	Sadachbia (for component Aa)	墳墓二	Fénmùèr	2nd star
Black Tortoise of the North (北方玄武)	危	Wēi	Rooftop	墳墓	Fénmù	Tomb	η Aqr	Fenmu	墳墓三	Fénmùsān	3rd star
Black Tortoise of the North (北方玄武)	危	Wēi	Rooftop	墳墓	Fénmù	Tomb	π Aqr		墳墓四	Fénmùsì	4th star
Black Tortoise of the North (北方玄武)	危	Wēi	Rooftop	墳墓	Fénmù	Tomb	60 Aqr		墳墓增四	Fénmùzēngsì	4th additional star
Black Tortoise of the North (北方玄武)	危	Wēi	Rooftop	蓋屋	Gàiwū	Roofing					
Black Tortoise of the North (北方玄武)	危	Wēi	Rooftop	蓋屋	Gàiwū	Roofing	ο Aqr		蓋屋一	Gàiwūyī	1st star
Black Tortoise of the North (北方玄武)	危	Wēi	Rooftop	蓋屋	Gàiwū	Roofing	32 Aqr		蓋屋二	Gàiwūèr	2nd star
Black Tortoise of the North (北方玄武)	危	Wēi	Rooftop	虛梁	Xūliáng	Temple					
Black Tortoise of the North (北方玄武)	危	Wēi	Rooftop	虛梁	Xūliáng	Temple	44 Aqr		虛梁一	Xūliángyī	1st star
Black Tortoise of the North (北方玄武)	危	Wēi	Rooftop	虛梁	Xūliáng	Temple	51 Aqr		虛梁二	Xūliángèr	2nd star
Black Tortoise of the North (北方玄武)	危	Wēi	Rooftop	虛梁	Xūliáng	Temple	κ Aqr	Situla (for component A)			
Black Tortoise of the North (北方玄武)	危	Wēi	Rooftop	虛梁	Xūliáng	Temple	κ Aqr	Situla (for component A)	虛梁三	Xūliángsān	3rd star
Black Tortoise of the North (北方玄武)	危	Wēi	Rooftop	虛梁	Xūliáng	Temple	κ Aqr	Situla (for component A)	三公	Sāngōng	Three leaders
Black Tortoise of the North (北方玄武)	危	Wēi	Rooftop	虛梁	Xūliáng	Temple	HD 216953		虛梁四	Xūliángsì	4th star
Black Tortoise of the North (北方玄武)	室	Shì	Encampment	壘壁陣	Lěibìzhèn	Line of Ramparts					
Black Tortoise of the North (北方玄武)	室	Shì	Encampment	壘壁陣	Lěibìzhèn	Line of Ramparts	ι Aqr		壘壁陣五	Lěibìzhènwu	5th star
Black Tortoise of the North (北方玄武)	室	Shì	Encampment	壘壁陣	Lěibìzhèn	Line of Ramparts	σ Aqr		壘壁陣六	Lěibìzhènliù	6th star
Black Tortoise of the North (北方玄武)	室	Shì	Encampment	壘壁陣	Lěibìzhèn	Line of Ramparts	λ Aqr	Shatabisha	壘壁陣七	Lěibìzhènqī	7th star
Black Tortoise of the North (北方玄武)	室	Shì	Encampment	壘壁陣	Lěibìzhèn	Line of Ramparts	φ Aqr		壘壁陣九	Lěibìzhènbā	8th star
Black Tortoise of the North (北方玄武)	室	Shì	Encampment	壘壁陣	Lěibìzhèn	Line of Ramparts	54 Aqr		壘壁陣增一	Lěibìzhènzēngyī	1st additional star
Black Tortoise of the North (北方玄武)	室	Shì	Encampment	壘壁陣	Lěibìzhèn	Line of Ramparts	67 Aqr		壘壁陣增二	Lěibìzhènzēngèr	2nd additional star
Black Tortoise of the North (北方玄武)	室	Shì	Encampment	壘壁陣	Lěibìzhèn	Line of Ramparts	78 Aqr		壘壁陣增三	Lěibìzhènzēngsān	3rd additional star
Black Tortoise of the North (北方玄武)	室	Shì	Encampment	羽林軍	Yǔlínjūn	Palace Guard					
Black Tortoise of the North (北方玄武)	室	Shì	Encampment	羽林軍	Yǔlínjūn	Palace Guard	29 Aqr		羽林軍一	Yǔlínjūnyī	1st star
Black Tortoise of the North (北方玄武)	室	Shì	Encampment	羽林軍	Yǔlínjūn	Palace Guard	35 Aqr		羽林軍二	Yǔlínjūnèr	2nd star
Black Tortoise of the North (北方玄武)	室	Shì	Encampment	羽林軍	Yǔlínjūn	Palace Guard	41 Aqr		羽林軍三	Yǔlínjūnsān	3rd star
Black Tortoise of the North (北方玄武)	室	Shì	Encampment	羽林軍	Yǔlínjūn	Palace Guard	47 Aqr		羽林軍四	Yǔlínjūnsì	4th star
Black Tortoise of the North (北方玄武)	室	Shì	Encampment	羽林軍	Yǔlínjūn	Palace Guard	49 Aqr		羽林軍五	Yǔlínjūnwu	5th star
Black Tortoise of the North (北方玄武)	室	Shì	Encampment	羽林軍	Yǔlínjūn	Palace Guard	υ Aqr		羽林軍十一	Yǔlínjūnshíyī	11th star
Black Tortoise of the North (北方玄武)	室	Shì	Encampment	羽林軍	Yǔlínjūn	Palace Guard	68 Aqr		羽林軍十二	Yǔlínjūnshíèr	12th star
Black Tortoise of the North (北方玄武)	室	Shì	Encampment	羽林軍	Yǔlínjūn	Palace Guard	66 Aqr		羽林軍十三	Yǔlínjūnshísān	13th star
Black Tortoise of the North (北方玄武)	室	Shì	Encampment	羽林軍	Yǔlínjūn	Palace Guard	61 Aqr		羽林軍十四	Yǔlínjūnshísì	14th star
Black Tortoise of the North (北方玄武)	室	Shì	Encampment	羽林軍	Yǔlínjūn	Palace Guard	53 Aqr		羽林軍十五	Yǔlínjūnshíwu	15th star
Black Tortoise of the North (北方玄武)	室	Shì	Encampment	羽林軍	Yǔlínjūn	Palace Guard	56 Aqr		羽林軍十六	Yǔlínjūnshíliù	16th star
Black Tortoise of the North (北方玄武)	室	Shì	Encampment	羽林軍	Yǔlínjūn	Palace Guard	50 Aqr		羽林軍十七	Yǔlínjūnshíqī	17th star
Black Tortoise of the North (北方玄武)	室	Shì	Encampment	羽林軍	Yǔlínjūn	Palace Guard	45 Aqr		羽林軍十八	Yǔlínjūnshíbā	18th star
Black Tortoise of the North (北方玄武)	室	Shì	Encampment	羽林軍	Yǔlínjūn	Palace Guard	58 Aqr		羽林軍十九	Yǔlínjūnshíjiǔ	19th star
Black Tortoise of the North (北方玄武)	室	Shì	Encampment	羽林軍	Yǔlínjūn	Palace Guard	64 Aqr		羽林軍二十	Yǔlínjūnèrshí	20th star
Black Tortoise of the North (北方玄武)	室	Shì	Encampment	羽林軍	Yǔlínjūn	Palace Guard	65 Aqr		羽林軍二十一	Yǔlínjūnèrshíyī	21st star
Black Tortoise of the North (北方玄武)	室	Shì	Encampment	羽林軍	Yǔlínjūn	Palace Guard	70 Aqr		羽林軍二十二	Yǔlínjūnèrshíèr	22nd star
Black Tortoise of the North (北方玄武)	室	Shì	Encampment	羽林軍	Yǔlínjūn	Palace Guard	74 Aqr		羽林軍二十三	Yǔlínjūnèrshísān	23rd star
Black Tortoise of the North (北方玄武)	室	Shì	Encampment	羽林軍	Yǔlínjūn	Palace Guard	τ^{2} Aqr	Lintangkumba	羽林軍二十四	Yǔlínjūnèrshísì	24th star
Black Tortoise of the North (北方玄武)	室	Shì	Encampment	羽林軍	Yǔlínjūn	Palace Guard	τ^{1} Aqr		羽林軍二十五	Yǔlínjūnèrshíwu	25th star
Black Tortoise of the North (北方玄武)	室	Shì	Encampment	羽林軍	Yǔlínjūn	Palace Guard	δ Aqr	Skat	羽林軍二十六	Yǔlínjūnèrshíliù	26th star
Black Tortoise of the North (北方玄武)	室	Shì	Encampment	羽林軍	Yǔlínjūn	Palace Guard	77 Aqr		羽林軍二十七	Yǔlínjūnèrshíqī	27th star
Black Tortoise of the North (北方玄武)	室	Shì	Encampment	羽林軍	Yǔlínjūn	Palace Guard	88 Aqr	Safina	羽林軍二十八	Yǔlínjūnèrshíbā	28th star
Black Tortoise of the North (北方玄武)	室	Shì	Encampment	羽林軍	Yǔlínjūn	Palace Guard	89 Aqr		羽林軍二十九	Yǔlínjūnèrshíjiǔ	29th star
Black Tortoise of the North (北方玄武)	室	Shì	Encampment	羽林軍	Yǔlínjūn	Palace Guard	86 Aqr		羽林軍三十	Yǔlínjūnsānshí	30th star
Black Tortoise of the North (北方玄武)	室	Shì	Encampment	羽林軍	Yǔlínjūn	Palace Guard	101 Aqr		羽林軍三十一	Yǔlínjūnsānshíyī	31st star
Black Tortoise of the North (北方玄武)	室	Shì	Encampment	羽林軍	Yǔlínjūn	Palace Guard	100 Aqr		羽林軍三十二	Yǔlínjūnsānshíèr	32nd star
Black Tortoise of the North (北方玄武)	室	Shì	Encampment	羽林軍	Yǔlínjūn	Palace Guard	99 Aqr		羽林軍三十三	Yǔlínjūnsānshísān	33rd star
Black Tortoise of the North (北方玄武)	室	Shì	Encampment	羽林軍	Yǔlínjūn	Palace Guard	98 Aqr		羽林軍三十四	Yǔlínjūnsānshísì	34th star
Black Tortoise of the North (北方玄武)	室	Shì	Encampment	羽林軍	Yǔlínjūn	Palace Guard	97 Aqr		羽林軍三十五	Yǔlínjūnsānshíwu	35th star
Black Tortoise of the North (北方玄武)	室	Shì	Encampment	羽林軍	Yǔlínjūn	Palace Guard	94 Aqr		羽林軍三十六	Yǔlínjūnsānshíliù	36th star
Black Tortoise of the North (北方玄武)	室	Shì	Encampment	羽林軍	Yǔlínjūn	Palace Guard	ψ^{3} Aqr		羽林軍三十七	Yǔlínjūnsānshíqī	37th star
Black Tortoise of the North (北方玄武)	室	Shì	Encampment	羽林軍	Yǔlínjūn	Palace Guard	ψ^{2} Aqr		羽林軍三十八	Yǔlínjūnsānshíbā	38th star
Black Tortoise of the North (北方玄武)	室	Shì	Encampment	羽林軍	Yǔlínjūn	Palace Guard	ψ^{1} Aqr		羽林軍三十九	Yǔlínjūnsānshíjiǔ	39th star
Black Tortoise of the North (北方玄武)	室	Shì	Encampment	羽林軍	Yǔlínjūn	Palace Guard	87 Aqr		羽林軍四十	Yǔlínjūnsìshí	40th star
Black Tortoise of the North (北方玄武)	室	Shì	Encampment	羽林軍	Yǔlínjūn	Palace Guard	85 Aqr		羽林軍四十一	Yǔlínjūnsìshíyī	41st star
Black Tortoise of the North (北方玄武)	室	Shì	Encampment	羽林軍	Yǔlínjūn	Palace Guard	83 Aqr		羽林軍四十二	Yǔlínjūnsìshíèr	42nd star
Black Tortoise of the North (北方玄武)	室	Shì	Encampment	羽林軍	Yǔlínjūn	Palace Guard	χ Aqr		羽林軍四十三	Yǔlínjūnsìshísān	43rd star
Black Tortoise of the North (北方玄武)	室	Shì	Encampment	羽林軍	Yǔlínjūn	Palace Guard	ω^{1} Aqr		羽林軍四十四	Yǔlínjūnsìshísì	44th star
Black Tortoise of the North (北方玄武)	室	Shì	Encampment	羽林軍	Yǔlínjūn	Palace Guard	ω^{2} Aqr		羽林軍四十五	Yǔlínjūnsìshíwu	45th star
Black Tortoise of the North (北方玄武)	室	Shì	Encampment	鈇鉞	Fūyuè	Axe					
Black Tortoise of the North (北方玄武)	室	Shì	Encampment	鈇鉞	Fūyuè	Axe	103 Aqr		鈇鉞一	Fūyuèyī	1st star
Black Tortoise of the North (北方玄武)	室	Shì	Encampment	鈇鉞	Fūyuè	Axe	106 Aqr		鈇鉞二	Fūyuèèr	2nd star
Black Tortoise of the North (北方玄武)	室	Shì	Encampment	鈇鉞	Fūyuè	Axe	108 Aqr		鈇鉞三	Fūyuèsān	3rd star
Black Tortoise of the North (北方玄武)	室	Shì	Encampment	鈇鉞	Fūyuè	Axe	104 Aqr		鈇鉞增一	Fūyuèzēngyī	1st additional star
Black Tortoise of the North (北方玄武)	室	Shì	Encampment	鈇鉞	Fūyuè	Axe	107 Aqr		鈇鉞增二	Fūyuèzēngèr	2nd additional star

== See also ==
- Chinese astronomy
- Traditional Chinese star names
- Chinese constellations
