= Lambda Piscis Austrini =

Star in the constellation Piscis Austrinus

λ Piscis Austrini
- Location of λ Piscis Austrini (circled in red)

Observation data Epoch J2000.0 Equinox J2000.0 (ICRS)
- Constellation: Piscis Austrinus
- Right ascension: 22^{h} 14^{m} 18.75029^{s}
- Declination: −27° 46′ 00.8756″
- Apparent magnitude (V): +5.42

Characteristics
- Evolutionary stage: main sequence
- Spectral type: B7 V
- B−V color index: −0.12

Astrometry
Radial velocity (R_{v})	−6.20 km/s
Proper motion (μ)	RA: +23.889 mas/yr Dec.: +2.562 mas/yr
Parallax (π)	6.5148±0.2222 mas
Distance	500 ± 20 ly (153 ± 5 pc)
Absolute magnitude (M_{V})	−0.13

Details
Mass	3.58±0.08 M_{☉}
Radius	4.2 R_{☉}
Luminosity	249 L_{☉}
Temperature	12,023 K
Rotational velocity (v sin i)	50 km/s
Age	215 Myr

Other designations
- λ PsA, 16 Piscis Austrini, CPD−28°7566, FK5 838, HD 210934, HIP 109789, HR 8478, SAO 190985

Database references
SIMBAD	data

Lambda Piscis Austrini, Latinized from λ Piscis Austrini, is a solitary star in the southern constellation of Piscis Austrinus. It has a blue-white hue and is visible to the naked eye with an apparent visual magnitude of +5.42. Based upon an annual parallax shift of 6.51 mas as measured from Earth, it is located around 500 light years from the Sun. At that distance, the visual magnitude of the star is diminished by an extinction factor of 0.16 due to interstellar dust.

This is a B-type main sequence star with a stellar classification of B7 V. It has an estimated 3.58 times the mass of the Sun and about 4.2 times the Sun's radius. The star is spinning with a projected rotational velocity of 50 km/s and is 76% of the way through its main sequence lifetime. It is radiating 249 times the solar luminosity from its photosphere at an effective temperature of 12,023 K.

Lambda Piscis Austrini is moving through the Galaxy at a speed of 18.1 km/s relative to the Sun. Its projected Galactic orbit carries it between 23,800 and 29,300 light years from the center of the Galaxy.

== Naming ==
In Chinese, 羽林軍 (Yǔ Lín Jūn), meaning Palace Guard, refers to an asterism consisting of λ Piscis Austrini, 29 Aquarii, 35 Aquarii, 41 Aquarii, 47 Aquarii, 49 Aquarii, HD 212448, ε Piscis Austrini, 21 Piscis Austrini, 20 Piscis Austrini, υ Aquarii, 68 Aquarii, 66 Aquarii, 61 Aquarii, 53 Aquarii, 50 Aquarii, 56 Aquarii, 45 Aquarii, 58 Aquarii, 64 Aquarii, 65 Aquarii, 70 Aquarii, 74 Aquarii, τ^{2} Aquarii, τ^{1} Aquarii, δ Aquarii, 77 Aquarii, 88 Aquarii, 89 Aquarii, 86 Aquarii, 101 Aquarii, 100 Aquarii, 99 Aquarii, 98 Aquarii, 97 Aquarii, 94 Aquarii, ψ^{3}Aquarii, ψ^{2}Aquarii, ψ^{1}Aquarii, 87 Aquarii, 85 Aquarii, 83 Aquarii, χ Aquarii, ω^{1} Aquarii and ω^{2} Aquarii. Consequently, the Chinese name for λ Piscis Austrini itself is 羽林軍六 (Yǔ Lín Jūn liù, English: the Sixth Star of Palace Guard.)
