= Epsilon Piscis Austrini =

Star in the constellation Piscis Austrinus

- Location of ε Piscis Austrini (circled)

Observation data Epoch J2000.0 Equinox J2000.0 (ICRS)
- Constellation: Piscis Austrinus
- Right ascension: 22^{h} 40^{m} 39.34826^{s}
- Declination: −27° 02′ 37.0151″
- Apparent magnitude (V): +4.17

Characteristics
- Evolutionary stage: subgiant
- Spectral type: B8 Ve or B8 IVe
- U−B color index: −0.31
- B−V color index: −0.11

Astrometry
Radial velocity (R_{v})	+1.1±2.8 km/s
Proper motion (μ)	RA: +21.839 mas/yr Dec.: −1.588 mas/yr
Parallax (π)	5.9219±0.2931 mas
Distance	550 ± 30 ly (169 ± 8 pc)
Absolute magnitude (M_{V})	−1.66

Details
Mass	5.95±0.30 M_{☉}
Radius	7.51±0.38 R_{☉}
Luminosity	661 L_{☉}
Surface gravity (log g)	3.93 cgs
Temperature	11,066 K
Rotational velocity (v sin i)	216 km/s

Other designations
- ε PsA, 18 Piscis Austrini, CD−27°16010, FK5 854, HD 214748, HIP 111954, HR 8628, SAO 191318

Database references
SIMBAD	data

Epsilon Piscis Austrini, Latinized from ε Piscis Austrini, is a blue-white hued star in the southern constellation of Piscis Austrinus. It is visible to the naked eye with an apparent visual magnitude of +4.17. Based upon an annual parallax shift of 5.92mas as seen from the Gaia satellite, the system is located at a distance of roughly 550 light years.

== Characteristics ==
This is a B-type main sequence star with a stellar classification of B8 Ve. It is a Be star that is spinning rapidly with a projected rotational velocity of 216 km/s, compared to an equatorial critical velocity of 301 km/s. The star has 6.0 times the mass of the Sun, 7.5 times the Sun's radius, and is radiating 661 times the solar luminosity from its photosphere at an effective temperature of 11,066 K.

Epsilon Piscis Austrini is part of a wide binary star system, the companion is likely a low-mass red dwarf with a projected separation of 11,700 astronomical units. It also exhibits a strong discrepancy between proper motion measurements taken by the Hipparcos and Gaia satellites, hinting the presence of an astrometric companion, possibly a solar-mass star, with a separation between 6 and 30 au.

The star is moving through the Galaxy at 18.7 km/s relative to the Sun. Its projected Galactic orbit carries it between 23,917 and 28,138 light-years from the center of the Galaxy.

== Naming ==
In Chinese, 羽林軍 (Yǔ Lín Jūn), meaning Palace Guard, refers to an asterism consisting of:

- ε Piscis Austrini
- 29 Aquarii
- 35 Aquarii
- 41 Aquarii
- 47 Aquarii
- 49 Aquarii
- λ Piscis Austrini
- HD 212448
- 21 Piscis Austrini
- 20 Piscis Austrini
- υ Aquarii
- 68 Aquarii
- 66 Aquarii
- 61 Aquarii
- 53 Aquarii
- 50 Aquarii
- 56 Aquarii
- 45 Aquarii
- 58 Aquarii
- 64 Aquarii
- 65 Aquarii
- 70 Aquarii
- 74 Aquarii
- τ^{2} Aquarii
- τ^{1} Aquarii
- δ Aquarii
- 77 Aquarii
- 88 Aquarii
- 89 Aquarii
- 86 Aquarii
- 101 Aquarii
- 100 Aquarii
- 99 Aquarii
- 98 Aquarii
- 97 Aquarii
- 94 Aquarii
- ψ^{3}Aquarii
- ψ^{2}Aquarii
- ψ^{1}Aquarii
- 87 Aquarii
- 85 Aquarii
- 83 Aquarii
- χ Aquarii
- ω^{1} Aquarii
- ω^{2} Aquarii

Consequently, the Chinese name for ε Piscis Austrini itself is 羽林軍八 (Yǔ Lín Jūn bā, English: the Eighth Sixth Star of Palace Guard.)
