= Delta Aquarii =

Star in the constellation Aquarius

δ Aquarii
- Location of δ Aquarii (circled)

Observation data Epoch J2000 Equinox ICRS
- Constellation: Aquarius
- Right ascension: 22^{h} 54^{m} 39.0125^{s}
- Declination: −15° 49′ 14.953″
- Apparent magnitude (V): 3.28

Characteristics
- Spectral type: A3Vp
- U−B color index: +0.08
- B−V color index: +0.05

Astrometry
Radial velocity (R_{v})	+17.4±0.9 km/s
Proper motion (μ)	RA: −38.904 mas/yr Dec.: −33.027 mas/yr
Parallax (π)	28.7936±0.7289 mas
Distance	113 ± 3 ly (34.7 ± 0.9 pc)
Absolute magnitude (M_{V})	−0.17

Details
Mass	3.19 M_{☉}
Radius	4.16 R_{☉}
Luminosity	100 L_{☉}
Surface gravity (log g)	3.73 cgs
Temperature	8,650 K
Metallicity [Fe/H]	–0.21 dex
Rotational velocity (v sin i)	81 km/s
Age	300 Myr

Other designations
- Skat, Scheat, 76 Aquarii, BD−16 6173, FK5 866, HD 216627, HIP 113136, HR 8709, SAO 165375

Database references
SIMBAD	data

Delta Aquarii is a binary star system in the constellation of Aquarius. Its identifier is a Bayer designation that is Latinized from δ Aquarii, and abbreviated Delta Aqr or δ Aqr, respectively. This system has the official name Skat, pronounced /ˈskæt/. It is the third-brightest star in Aquarius with an apparent visual magnitude of 3.3, and is readily visible to the naked eye at night. The distance to this system is about 113 light-years (35 parsecs) based upon parallax measurements. It is drifting further away from the Sun with a radial velocity of +17 km/s.

== Nomenclature ==
δ Aquarii (Latinised to Delta Aquarii) is the star's Bayer designation. It also has the Flamsteed designation 76 Aquarii.

It bore the traditional name Skat (also rendered Scheat, Seat, Sheat, etc., which was erroneously applied to Beta Pegasi in late medieval times), from the Arabic الساق al-sāq "shin".

In 2016, the International Astronomical Union organized a Working Group on Star Names (WGSN) to catalogue and standardize proper names for stars. The WGSN approved the name Skat for this star on 21 August 2016, and it is now so included in the List of IAU-approved Star Names.

In Chinese, 羽林軍 (Yǔ Lín Jūn), meaning Palace Guard, refers to an asterism consisting of Delta Aquarii, 29 Aquarii, 35 Aquarii, 41 Aquarii, 47 Aquarii, 49 Aquarii, Lambda Piscis Austrini, HD 212448, Epsilon Piscis Austrini, 21 Piscis Austrini, 20 Piscis Austrini, Upsilon Aquarii, 68 Aquarii, 66 Aquarii, 61 Aquarii, 53 Aquarii, 50 Aquarii, 56 Aquarii, 45 Aquarii, 58 Aquarii, 64 Aquarii, 65 Aquarii, 70 Aquarii, 74 Aquarii, Tau^{2} Aquarii, Tau^{1} Aquarii, 77 Aquarii, 88 Aquarii, 89 Aquarii, 86 Aquarii, 101 Aquarii, 100 Aquarii, 99 Aquarii, 98 Aquarii, 97 Aquarii, 94 Aquarii, Psi^{3}Aquarii, Psi^{2}Aquarii, Psi^{1}Aquarii, 87 Aquarii, 85 Aquarii, 83 Aquarii, Chi Aquarii, Omega^{1} Aquarii and Omega^{2} Aquarii. Consequently, the Chinese name for Delta Aquarii itself is 羽林軍二十六 (Yǔ Lín Jūn ershíliù, English: the Twenty Sixth Star of Palace Guard).

== Properties ==
The spectrum of Delta Aquarii matches a stellar classification of A3 Vp, indicating this is a chemically peculiar A-type main-sequence star that is generating energy through the nuclear fusion of hydrogen at its core. This star has three times the Sun's mass and a radius 4.16 times as large. It is radiating 100 times the luminosity of the Sun from its outer atmosphere at an effective temperature of around 9,000 K. This heat gives it the characteristic white-hued glow of an A-type star. It has a relatively high rate of rotation, with a projected rotational velocity of 81 km s^{−1}.

Delta Aquarii does not display a strong signal of excess infrared emission that might indicate the presence of circumstellar matter. It is a probable stream star member of the Ursa Major Moving Group, which has an estimated age of 500 million years.

An analysis of Hipparcos data strongly suggested a close companion object. An orbit was derived with a 483-day period, an eccentricity of 0.12, and an inclination of 41°. When Delta Aquarii was first examined for a companion, none was found. Any possible companion beyond 100 au was constrained to be less than 0.07 M_{☉}. Infrared interferometric observations did subsequently find a companion in 2017: a likely G5 main sequence star around 2 au from the primary.
