= C Aquarii =

The Bayer designation c Aquarii is shared by three stars in the constellation Aquarius:

- c^{1} Aquarii or 86 Aquarii
- c^{2} Aquarii or 88 Aquarii
- c^{3} Aquarii or 89 Aquarii
