= B Aquarii =

Several astronomical objects

b Aquarii refers to several different astronomical objects:

- b^{1} Aquarii or 98 Aquarii
- b^{2} Aquarii or 99 Aquarii
- b^{3} Aquarii or 101 Aquarii
