= G Aquarii =

g Aquarii can refer to two different astronomical objects:

- g^{1} Aquarii or 66 Aquarii, commonly called simply g Aquarii
- g^{2} Aquarii or 68 Aquarii
