= 11 Aquarii =

Star in the constellation Aquarius

Observation data Epoch J2000 Equinox ICRS
- Constellation: Aquarius
- Right ascension: 21^{h} 00^{m} 33.84082^{s}
- Declination: −04° 43′ 48.9421″
- Apparent magnitude (V): 6.216

Characteristics
- Spectral type: G1 V
- U−B color index: +0.22
- B−V color index: +0.63

Astrometry
Radial velocity (R_{v})	−17.8±2 km/s
Proper motion (μ)	RA: 48.856 mas/yr Dec.: –137.781 mas/yr
Parallax (π)	36.8541±0.0570 mas
Distance	88.5 ± 0.1 ly (27.13 ± 0.04 pc)
Absolute magnitude (M_{V})	4.10

Details
Mass	1.20±0.01 M_{☉}
Radius	1.30 R_{☉}
Luminosity	2.24 L_{☉}
Surface gravity (log g)	4.32±0.02 cgs
Temperature	5,967±7 K
Metallicity [Fe/H]	+0.273±0.006 dex
Rotational velocity (v sin i)	5 km/s
Age	3.70+0.09 −0.14 Gyr

Other designations
- 11 Aqr, BD−05°5433, HD 199960, HIP 103682, HR 8041, SAO 145022

Database references
SIMBAD	data

11 Aquarii is a sun-like star in the zodiac constellation of Aquarius, located 88.5 light years away from the Sun. 11 Aquarii is the Flamsteed designation. It is difficult to see with the naked eye, appearing as a dim, yellow-hued star with an apparent visual magnitude of 6.22. This body is moving closer to the Earth with a heliocentric radial velocity of −17.8 km/s, and is expected to come as close as 65.1 ly in 700,000 years.

It is a G-type main-sequence star with a stellar classification of G1 V. Compared to the Sun, this star has a higher abundance of elements more massive than helium. This indicates it belongs to a class of stars called metal-rich. The star is 3.7 billion years old, it has 1.20 times the mass and 1.30 times the radius of the Sun. It is radiating 2.24 times the luminosity of the Sun from its photosphere at an effective temperature of 5,944 K.
