= 15 Aquarii =

Star in the constellation Aquarius

Observation data Epoch J2000 Equinox J2000
- Constellation: Aquarius
- Right ascension: 21^{h} 18^{m} 11.07309^{s}
- Declination: −04° 31′ 10.1276″
- Apparent magnitude (V): 5.83

Characteristics
- Spectral type: B7 III or B5 V
- B−V color index: −0.130±0.005

Astrometry
Radial velocity (R_{v})	−9.0±1.0 km/s
Proper motion (μ)	RA: +12.11 mas/yr Dec.: +12.94 mas/yr
Parallax (π)	4.5632±0.1345 mas
Distance	710 ± 20 ly (219 ± 6 pc)
Absolute magnitude (M_{V})	−1.62

Details
Mass	5.7±0.2 M_{☉}
Radius	3.4 R_{☉}
Luminosity	821.67 L_{☉}
Surface gravity (log g)	3.84 cgs
Temperature	14,318 K
Rotational velocity (v sin i)	20 km/s
Age	65.2±25.1 Myr

Other designations
- 15 Aqr, BD−05°5512, HD 202753, HIP 105164, HR 8141, SAO 145278

Database references
SIMBAD	data

15 Aquarii, abbreviated 15 Aqr, is a single, blue-white star in the zodiac constellation of Aquarius. 15 Aquarii is the Flamsteed designation. It is a dim star that is just visible to the naked eye under good viewing conditions, having an apparent visual magnitude of 5.83. Based upon an annual parallax shift of 4.6 mas, it is located around 710 light years away. At that distance, the visual magnitude is diminished by an extinction of 0.18 due to interstellar dust. It is moving closer to the Earth with a heliocentric radial velocity of −9 km/s. Relative to its neighbors, 15 Aqr has a peculiar velocity of 28.7+2.9
−3.1 km/s and may (62% chance) be a runaway star.

Hube (1970) found a stellar classification of B7 III for this star, which would suggest it is a B-type giant star. However, the Bright Star Catalogue (1964) listed it as a B-type main-sequence star with a class of B5 V, and multiple sources use this instead. The star is roughly 65 million years old with a projected rotational velocity of 20 km/s. It has an estimated 5.7 times the mass of the Sun and about 3.4 times the Sun's radius. 15 Aquarii is radiating 822 times the Sun's luminosity from its photosphere at an effective temperature of 14,318 K.
