= 16 Aquarii =

Star in the constellation Aquarius

Observation data Epoch J2000 Equinox ICRS
- Constellation: Aquarius
- Right ascension: 21^{h} 21^{m} 04.31919^{s}
- Declination: −04° 33′ 36.4532″
- Apparent magnitude (V): 5.869

Characteristics
- Spectral type: G7 III
- B−V color index: 0.912±0.001

Astrometry
Radial velocity (R_{v})	−6.0±2.9 km/s
Proper motion (μ)	RA: −9.86 mas/yr Dec.: +11.22 mas/yr
Parallax (π)	9.5319±0.1192 mas
Distance	342 ± 4 ly (105 ± 1 pc)
Absolute magnitude (M_{V})	1.08

Details
Mass	2.34±0.13 M_{☉}
Radius	7.86±0.26 R_{☉}
Luminosity	37.4±2.3 L_{☉}
Surface gravity (log g)	3.03±0.04 cgs
Temperature	5,096±35 K
Metallicity [Fe/H]	0.01±0.10 dex
Rotational velocity (v sin i)	1.79 km/s
Age	740±130 Myr

Other designations
- 15 Aqr, BD−05°5524, HD 203222, HIP 105412, HR 8160, SAO 145317

Database references
SIMBAD	data

16 Aquarii, abbreviated 16 Aqr, is a star in the constellation of Aquarius. 16 Aquarii is the Flamsteed designation. It is a faint star, just visible to the naked eye, with an apparent visual magnitude of 5.869. Based upon an annual parallax shift of 9.5 mas, it is located about 342 light years away. It is moving closer to the Earth with a heliocentric radial velocity of −6 km/s, and is predicted to come within 220 light-years in 6.8 million years.

At the estimated age of 740 million years, this is an aging giant star currently on the red giant branch with a stellar classification of G7 III. This indicates it has exhausted the supply of hydrogen at its core and is generating energy via hydrogen fusion along a shell surrounding a hot core of inert helium. The star has 2.3 times the mass of the Sun and has expanded to 8 times the Sun's radius. It is radiating 37 times the Sun's luminosity from its enlarged photosphere at an effective temperature of 5,096 K.
