= 20 Aquarii =

Star in the constellation Aquarius

Observation data Epoch J2000 Equinox J2000
- Constellation: Aquarius
- Right ascension: 21^{h} 24^{m} 51.67515^{s}
- Declination: −03° 23′ 54.0858″
- Apparent magnitude (V): 6.38

Characteristics
- Spectral type: F0 V or F0 III
- B−V color index: 0.334±0.002

Astrometry
Radial velocity (R_{v})	−23.2±2.9 km/s
Proper motion (μ)	RA: −6.125 mas/yr Dec.: −49.515 mas/yr
Parallax (π)	15.3426±0.0730 mas
Distance	213 ± 1 ly (65.2 ± 0.3 pc)
Absolute magnitude (M_{V})	2.37

Details
Mass	1.52 M_{☉}
Luminosity	9.38 L_{☉}
Surface gravity (log g)	4.17 cgs
Temperature	7,314±249 K
Rotational velocity (v sin i)	92 km/s
Age	761 Myr

Other designations
- 20 Aqr, BD−05°5444, GC 29976, HD 203843, HIP 105729, HR 8192, SAO 145376

Database references
SIMBAD	data

20 Aquarii, abbreviated 20 Aqr, is a star in the constellation Aquarius. 20 Aquarii is the Flamsteed designation. It is a dim star with an apparent visual magnitude of 6.38. Based upon an annual parallax shift of 15.34 mas, it is located 213 light years away but is moving closer to the Earth with a heliocentric radial velocity of −23 km/s. The star is predicted to come to within 110 light-years in around 1.9 million years.

This is an F-type main-sequence star with a stellar classification of F0 V. (Cowley and Fraquelli [1974] had given it a class of F0 III.) It is a suspected chemically peculiar Am star showing metallic lines. It is 761 million years old with a high projected rotational velocity of 92 km/s. The star has 1.52 times the mass of the Sun and is radiating 9 times the Sun's luminosity from its photosphere at an effective temperature of about 7,314 K.
