= 21 Aquarii =

Star in the constellation Aquarius

Observation data Epoch J2000.0 Equinox ICRS
- Constellation: Aquarius
- Right ascension: 21^{h} 25^{m} 16.95755^{s}
- Declination: −03° 33′ 24.2964″
- Apparent magnitude (V): 5.48

Characteristics
- Spectral type: K4III
- B−V color index: 1.451±0.011

Astrometry
| Radial velocity (R_{v}) | −24.5±2 km/s |
| Proper motion (μ) | RA: −12.061 mas/yr Dec.: −69.973 mas/yr |
| Parallax (π) | 7.8747±0.2182 mas |
| Distance | 410 ± 10 ly (127 ± 4 pc) |
| Absolute magnitude (M_{V}) | 0.11 |

Details
| Radius | 28.01+1.09 −2.12 R_{☉} |
| Luminosity | 203.4±6.4 L_{☉} |
| Surface gravity (log g) | 1.79 cgs |
| Temperature | 4119+165 −78 K |
| Metallicity [Fe/H] | −0.08 dex |

Other designations
- BD−04°5446, FK5 3708, HD 203926, HIP 105767, HR 8199, SAO 145384

Database references
| SIMBAD | data |

21 Aquarii is a single star in the zodiac constellation of Aquarius. 21 Aquarii is the Flamsteed designation. It is visible to the naked eye as a dim, orange-hued star with an apparent visual magnitude of 5.49. This object is a member of the HR 1614 moving group, and is moving closer to the Earth with a heliocentric radial velocity of −24.5 km/s.

This object is an evolved giant star with a stellar classification of K4 III. As a result of having exhausted the hydrogen at its core, it has expanded to 27 times the radius of the Sun. The star is radiating 203 times the luminosity of the Sun from its swollen photosphere at an effective temperature of 4,120 K.
