= 67 Aquarii =

Star in the constellation Aquarius

Observation data Epoch J2000.0 Equinox J2000.0 (ICRS)
- Constellation: Aquarius
- Right ascension: 22^{h} 43^{m} 14.26269^{s}
- Declination: −06° 57′ 46.5752″
- Apparent magnitude (V): 6.40

Characteristics
- Evolutionary stage: main sequence
- Spectral type: B7.5 V or B9 V
- B−V color index: −0.039±0.008

Astrometry
Radial velocity (R_{v})	2.0±3.8 km/s
Proper motion (μ)	RA: +26.147 mas/yr Dec.: −10.192 mas/yr
Parallax (π)	8.0002±0.0694 mas
Distance	408 ± 4 ly (125 ± 1 pc)
Absolute magnitude (M_{V})	1.12

Details
Mass	2.46±0.05 M_{☉}
Radius	2.0 R_{☉}
Luminosity	41.9+5.5 −4.9 L_{☉}
Surface gravity (log g)	3.998±0.014 cgs
Temperature	10,257±48 K
Rotational velocity (v sin i)	205 km/s
Age	316 Myr

Other designations
- 67 Aqr, BD−07°5838, FK5 3819, GC 31703, HD 215143, HIP 112179, HR 8647, SAO 146273

Database references
SIMBAD	data

67 Aquarii is a star located 484 light years away from the Sun in the zodiac constellation of Aquarius. 67 Aquarii is its Flamsteed designation. It is a dim, blue-white hued star near the lower limit of visibility to the naked eye with an apparent visual magnitude of 6.40. At the distance of this star, its visual magnitude is diminished by an extinction of 0.11 due to interstellar dust. The position of this star near the ecliptic means it is subject to lunar eclipses.

This is a late B-type main-sequence star with a stellar classification of B7.5 V, which indicates it is generating energy through hydrogen fusion at its core. It is 316 million years old and is spinning rapidly with a projected rotational velocity of 205 km/s; the critical velocity for this star is 377 km/s. 67 Aquarii has 2.46 times the mass of the Suns and about double the Sun's radius. It is radiating 42 times the luminosity of the Sun from its photosphere at an effective temperature of 10,257 K.
