= 28 Aquarii =

Star in the constellation Aquarius

Observation data Epoch J2000 Equinox ICRS
- Constellation: Aquarius
- Right ascension: 22^{h} 01^{m} 05.01544^{s}
- Declination: +00° 36′ 16.9787″
- Apparent magnitude (V): 5.597

Characteristics
- Spectral type: K2III
- U−B color index: +1.40
- B−V color index: +1.28

Astrometry
| Radial velocity (R_{v}) | +8.12±0.1 km/s |
| Proper motion (μ) | RA: +6.22 mas/yr Dec.: −11.05 mas/yr |
| Parallax (π) | 5.7956±0.1557 mas |
| Distance | 560 ± 20 ly (173 ± 5 pc) |

Details
| Mass | 1.47 M_{☉} |
| Radius | 28.15+0.61 −0.93 R_{☉} |
| Luminosity | 258±8 L_{☉} |
| Surface gravity (log g) | 2.3 cgs |
| Temperature | 4,361 K |
| Age | 2.9 Gyr |

Other designations
- 28 Aqr, BD−00°4296, HD 209128, HIP 108691, HR 8390, SAO 127235

Database references
| SIMBAD | data |

28 Aquarii is a single star located about 560 light years away from the Sun in the zodiac constellation of Aquarius. 28 Aquarii is the Flamsteed designation. It is visible to the naked eye as a dim, orange-hued star with an apparent visual magnitude of 5.6. This object is moving further from the Earth with a heliocentric radial velocity of +8.1 km/s.

This 2.9 billion year old object is an aging giant star with a stellar classification of K2 III. After exhausting the hydrogen at its core, this star evolved off the main sequence and has now expanded to 28 times the Sun's radius. It has 1.47 times the mass of the Sun and is radiating 258 times the Sun's luminosity from its swollen photosphere at an effective temperature of 4,361 K.
