= 60 Aquarii =

Star in the constellation of Aquarius

Observation data Epoch J2000 Equinox ICRS
- Constellation: Aquarius
- Right ascension: 22^{h} 34^{m} 02.91361^{s}
- Declination: −01° 34′ 27.3638″
- Apparent magnitude (V): 5.89

Characteristics
- Evolutionary stage: horizontal branch
- Spectral type: G6 III
- U−B color index: +0.73
- B−V color index: +1.00

Astrometry
Radial velocity (R_{v})	−8 km/s
Proper motion (μ)	RA: +40.30 mas/yr Dec.: –35.92 mas/yr
Parallax (π)	8.6909±0.1113 mas
Distance	375 ± 5 ly (115 ± 1 pc)
Absolute magnitude (M_{V})	+0.14

Details
Mass	2.77 M_{☉}
Radius	11.13+0.26 −0.16 R_{☉}
Luminosity	64.7±1.0 L_{☉}
Surface gravity (log g)	2.88 cgs
Temperature	4,820 K
Metallicity [Fe/H]	−0.24 dex
Age	437 Myr

Other designations
- 60 Aqr, BD−02°5781, HD 213789, HIP 111394, HR 8590, SAO 146160, WDS J22340-0134

Database references
SIMBAD	data

60 Aquarii is a star located 375 light years away from the Sun in the equatorial constellation of Aquarius. 60 Aquarii is its Flamsteed designation. It is visible to the naked eye as a dim, yellow-hued star with an apparent visual magnitude of 5.89. The star is moving closer to the Earth with a heliocentric radial velocity of –8 km/s.

This is an aging giant star with a stellar classification of G6 III, most likely on the horizontal branch. It is 437 million years old with 2.77 times the mass of the Sun. Having exhausted the hydrogen at its core, this star has evolved away from the main sequence and expanded to 11 times the Sun's radius. It is radiating 65 times the luminosity of the Sun from its swollen photosphere at an effective temperature of 4,820 K.

A magnitude 11.54 companion star is located at an angular separation of 100.90″ along a position angle of 299°, as of 2013.
