= 50 Aquarii =

Star in the constellation Aquarius

Observation data Epoch J2000 Equinox J2000
- Constellation: Aquarius
- Right ascension: 22^{h} 24^{m} 27.06016^{s}
- Declination: −13° 31′ 45.7290″
- Apparent magnitude (V): 5.76

Characteristics
- Spectral type: G7.5 III
- B−V color index: 0.970±0.004

Astrometry
Radial velocity (R_{v})	−21.1±2.9 km/s
Proper motion (μ)	RA: +98.380 mas/yr Dec.: −2.909 mas/yr
Parallax (π)	12.2800±0.0965 mas
Distance	266 ± 2 ly (81.4 ± 0.6 pc)
Absolute magnitude (M_{V})	+0.03

Details
Mass	2.49±0.25 M_{☉}
Radius	14.17±0.81 R_{☉}
Luminosity	103.7±11.5 L_{☉}
Surface gravity (log g)	2.55±0.07 cgs
Temperature	4,897±34 K
Metallicity [Fe/H]	−0.21±0.10 dex
Rotational velocity (v sin i)	4.07 km/s
Age	620±170 Myr

Other designations
- 50 Aqr, CD−14°6276, HD 212430, HIP 110602, HR 8534, SAO 165044

Database references
SIMBAD	data

50 Aquarii, abbreviated 50 Aqr, is a single star in the zodiac constellation of Aquarius. 50 Aquarii is its Flamsteed designation. It is a faint star with an apparent visual magnitude of 5.76 that is barely visible to the naked eye under good seeing conditions. The star is located near the ecliptic and thus is subject to lunar occultations. Based upon an annual parallax shift of 12.2 mas as seen from Earth orbit, it is located 266 light years away. It is moving closer to the Earth with a heliocentric radial velocity of −21 km/s.

This is an evolved giant star with a stellar classification of G7.5 III that is most likely (87% chance) on the red giant branch. As such, it is estimated to be 620 million years old with 2.5 times the mass of the Sun and has expanded to 14 times the Sun's radius. The star is radiating 104 times the Sun's luminosity from its expanded photosphere at an effective temperature of 4,897 K.
