= 83 Aquarii =

Binary star in the constellation Aquarius

- Location of 83 Aquarii (circled)

Observation data Epoch J2000 Equinox ICRS
- Constellation: Aquarius
- Right ascension: 23^{h} 05^{m} 09.78684^{s}
- Declination: −07° 41′ 37.6853″
- Apparent magnitude (V): 5.43 (6.20/6.34)

Characteristics
- Spectral type: F2 Vn + F2 V
- U−B color index: +0.07
- B−V color index: +0.30

Astrometry
Radial velocity (R_{v})	−13 km/s
Proper motion (μ)	RA: +122.41 mas/yr Dec.: +7.11 mas/yr
Parallax (π)	15.57±0.61 mas
Distance	209 ± 8 ly (64 ± 3 pc)

Orbit
Secondary	83 Aquarii B
Period (P)	21.840 ± 0.019 yr
Semi-major axis (a)	0.2026 ± 0.0007″
Eccentricity (e)	0.3878 ± 0.0025
Inclination (i)	48.01 ± 0.42°
Longitude of the node (Ω)	204.87 ± 0.50°
Periastron epoch (T)	1983.108 ± 0.022
Argument of periastron (ω) (secondary)	82.83 ± 0.45°

Other designations
- BD−08 6018, h Aquarii, HD 218060, HIP 113996, HR 8782, SAO 146498.

Database references
SIMBAD	data

83 Aquarii (abbreviated 83 Aqr) is a binary star system in the equatorial constellation of Aquarius. The combined apparent visual magnitude of the pair is 5.43, which is faintly visible to the naked eye. Based upon an annual parallax shift of 15.57 milliarcseconds, it is located at a distance of around 209 light-years (64 parsecs) from Earth.

Both stars are F-type main sequence stars. The first component has an apparent magnitude of 6.20; the second is magnitude 6.34. They are orbiting each other with a period of 21.84 years with an eccentricity of 0.388.

On 11 April 2024, it had a close conjunction (geocentric separation <1') with Saturn.
