= Psi3 Aquarii =

Binary star in the constellation Aquarius

ψ^{3} Aquarii
- Location of ψ^{3} Aquarii (circled)

Observation data Epoch J2000 Equinox J2000
- Constellation: Aquarius
- Right ascension: 23^{h} 18^{m} 57.677^{s}
- Declination: −09° 36′ 38.70″
- Apparent magnitude (V): 4.98

Characteristics
- Evolutionary stage: Main sequence
- Spectral type: A0 V
- U−B color index: −0.02
- B−V color index: −0.02

Astrometry
Radial velocity (R_{v})	−10 km/s
Proper motion (μ)	RA: +44.346 mas/yr Dec.: −7.951 mas/yr
Parallax (π)	14.1132±0.1253 mas
Distance	231 ± 2 ly (70.9 ± 0.6 pc)
Absolute magnitude (M_{V})	+0.47

Details

A
Mass	2.67±0.04 M_{☉}
Radius	2 R_{☉}
Luminosity	72.9^{+6.0}_{−5.5} L_{☉}
Surface gravity (log g)	4.2±0.14 cgs
Temperature	9,931^{+69}_{−68} K
Rotational velocity (v sin i)	144 km/s
Age	284^{+38}_{−79} Myr

B
Mass	0.8±0.02 M_{☉}
Temperature	4,943±91 K
Metallicity [Fe/H]	0.5 dex

Other designations
- Psi^{3} Aqr, ψ^{3} Aqr, 95 Aquarii, BD−10 6094, FK5 1609, GC 32459, HD 219832, HIP 115115, HR 8865, SAO 146635, PPM 207410, ADS 16671, WDS J23190-0937A

Database references
SIMBAD	data

Psi^{3} Aquarii is a visual binary star system in the constellation of Aquarius. Its name is a Bayer designation that is Latinized from ψ^{3} Aquarii, and abbreviated Psi^{3} Aqr or ψ^{3} Aqr. The pair has an apparent visual magnitude of 4.98, which is bright enough to be seen with the naked eye. Parallax measurements give a distance estimate of roughly 262 light-years (80 parsecs), but it is drifting closer with a radial velocity of −10 km/s.

The main component of this system is an A-type main sequence star with a stellar classification of A0 V. It has 2.7 times the mass and double the radius of the Sun. The star is radiating 73 times as much luminosity as the Sun from its photosphere at an effective temperature of 9,931 K. It is around 284 million years old and has a high rate of spin with a projected rotational velocity of 144 km/s.

Its companion is an 9th magnitude star at an angular separation of 1.5 arcseconds from the primary. This system is an X-ray source with a luminosity of 8.34×10^{29} erg·s^{−1}. This radiation most likely comes from the companion star.
