= Chi Aquarii =

Star in the constellation Aquarius

χ Aquarii
- Location of χ Aquarii (circled)

Observation data Epoch J2000 Equinox ICRS
- Constellation: Aquarius
- Right ascension: 23^{h} 16^{m} 50.939^{s}
- Declination: −07° 43′ 35.40″
- Apparent magnitude (V): 4.75–5.10

Characteristics
- Evolutionary stage: AGB
- Spectral type: M3 III
- U−B color index: +1.60
- B−V color index: +1.60
- Variable type: SRb?

Astrometry
Radial velocity (R_{v})	−13.72±0.86 km/s
Proper motion (μ)	RA: −17.721 mas/yr Dec.: −13.676 mas/yr
Parallax (π)	6.1612±0.2060 mas
Distance	530 ± 20 ly (162 ± 5 pc)
Absolute magnitude (M_{V})	−1.43

Details
Radius	142 R_{☉}
Luminosity	2,598 L_{☉}
Surface gravity (log g)	0.128 cgs
Temperature	3,456 K

Other designations
- χ Aqr, 92 Aquarii, AAVSO 2311-08, BD−08 6076, GC 32401, HD 219576, HIP 114939, HR 8850, SAO 146612, PPM 207366

Database references
SIMBAD	data

Chi Aquarii is a star in the equatorial constellation of Aquarius. Its name is a Bayer designation that is Latinized from χ Aquarii, and abbreviated Chi Aqr or χ Aqr. The distance to this star, based upon parallax measurements with a 7% margin of error, is 530 light-years (160 parsecs). It is visible to the naked eye with an apparent visual magnitude of about 5.

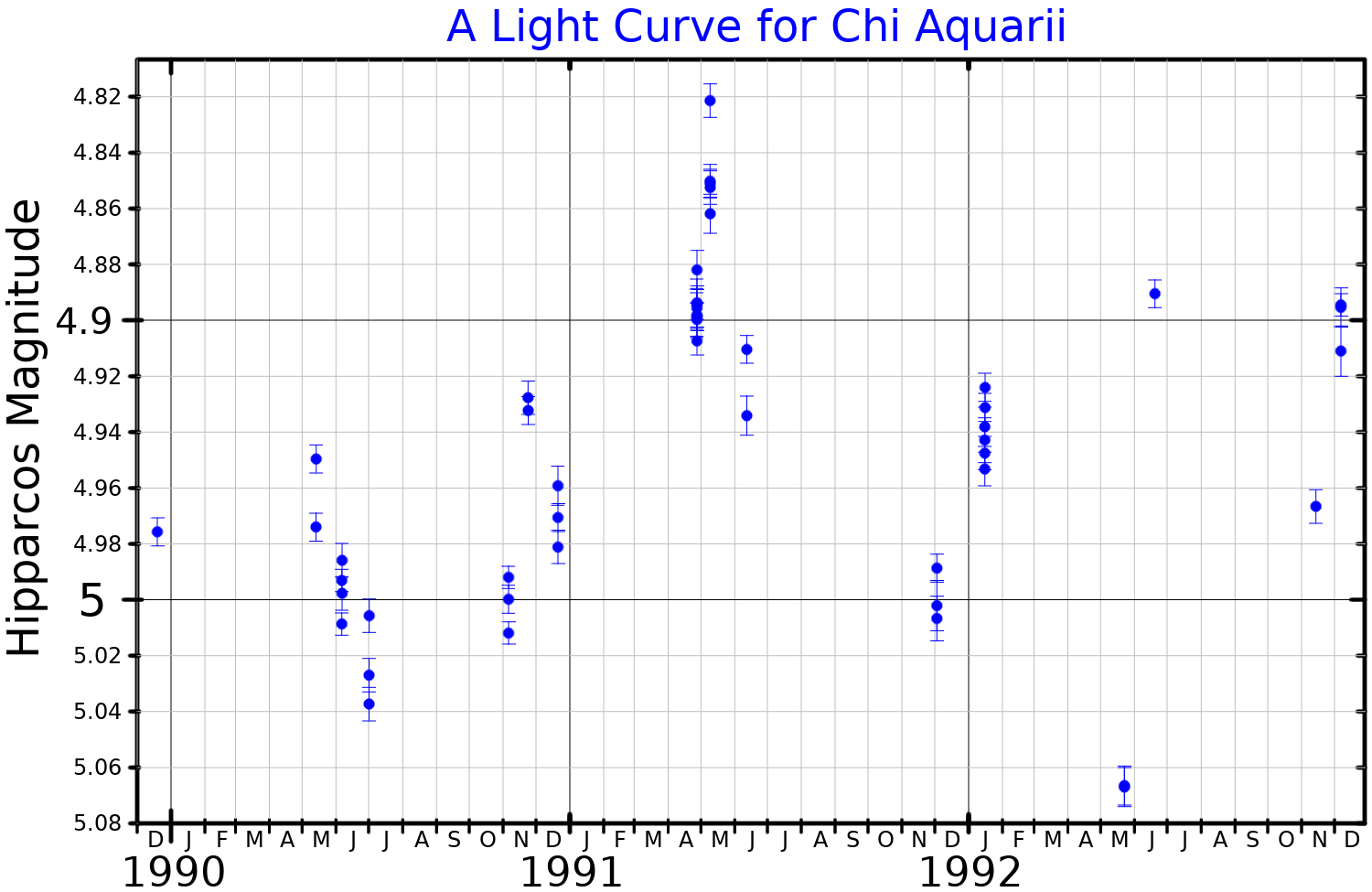
A light curve for Chi Aquarii, plotted from Hipparcos data

The variability of the brightness of Chi Aquarii was announced by Joel Stebbins and Charles Morse Huffer in 1928, based on observations made at Washburn Observatory. It is classified as a semi-regular variable star and its brightness varies by an amplitude of 0.0636 in magnitude. The identified pulsation periods are 32.3, 38.5, and 44.9 days.

This is an aging red giant star with a spectral classification of M3 III. After the supply of hydrogen at its core was exhausted, it evolved off the main sequence, expanding to about 142 times the radius of the Sun. The star is radiating 2,598 times the luminosity of the Sun from its enlarged photosphere at an effective temperature of 3,456 K.
