= 47 Aquarii =

Star in the constellation Aquarius

Observation data Epoch J2000 Equinox ICRS
- Constellation: Aquarius
- Right ascension: 22^{h} 21^{m} 35.56816^{s}
- Declination: −21° 35′ 53.6431″
- Apparent magnitude (V): 5.135

Characteristics
- Spectral type: K0 III
- B−V color index: 1.054

Astrometry
| Radial velocity (R_{v}) | +48.2 km/s |
| Proper motion (μ) | RA: −10.986 mas/yr Dec.: −83.914 mas/yr |
| Parallax (π) | 18.0015±0.1709 mas |
| Distance | 181 ± 2 ly (55.6 ± 0.5 pc) |
| Absolute magnitude (M_{V}) | +1.52 |

Details
| Mass | 1.35 M_{☉} |
| Radius | 7.86 R_{☉} |
| Luminosity | 30 L_{☉} |
| Surface gravity (log g) | 2.69 cgs |
| Temperature | 4,750 K |
| Metallicity [Fe/H] | −0.18±0.08 dex |
| Rotational velocity (v sin i) | 1.43 km/s |
| Age | 2.4 Gyr |

Other designations
- 47 Aqr, BD−22°5897, FK5 1584, HD 212010, HIP 110391, HR 8516, SAO 191083

Database references
| SIMBAD | data |

47 Aquarii, abbreviated 47 Aqr, is a star in the zodiac constellation of Aquarius. 47 Aquarii is its Flamsteed designation. It is a faint star but visible to the naked eye in good seeing conditions, having an apparent visual magnitude of 5.135. Based upon an annual parallax shift of 18.0 mas, it is located 181 light years away. At that distance, the visual magnitude of the star is diminished by an extinction of 0.088 due to interstellar dust. It is moving further from the Earth with a heliocentric radial velocity of +48 km/s.

This is an evolved giant star currently on the red giant branch with a stellar classification of K0 III. The star has 1.35 times the mass of the Sun and has expanded to 7.86 times the Sun's radius. It is radiating 30 times the Sun's luminosity from its enlarged photosphere at an effective temperature of 4,750 K.
