= Psi2 Aquarii =

Star in the constellation Aquarius

ψ^{2} Aquarii
- Location of ψ^{2} Aquarii (circled)

Observation data Epoch J2000 Equinox J2000
- Constellation: Aquarius
- Right ascension: 23^{h} 17^{m} 54.21372^{s}
- Declination: −09° 10′ 57.0675″
- Apparent magnitude (V): 4.403

Characteristics
- Spectral type: B5 Vn
- U−B color index: −0.561
- B−V color index: −0.146
- Variable type: λ Eri

Astrometry
Radial velocity (R_{v})	−6 km/s
Proper motion (μ)	RA: +17.13 mas/yr Dec.: −11.70 mas/yr
Parallax (π)	8.12±0.38 mas
Distance	400 ± 20 ly (123 ± 6 pc)
Absolute magnitude (M_{V})	−1.04

Details
Radius	4.6 R_{☉}
Luminosity	565 L_{☉}
Temperature	15,212 ± 288 K
Rotational velocity (v sin i)	341 km/s

Other designations
- ψ^{2} Aqr, 93 Aquarii, BD−09°6160, HD 219688, HIP 115033, HR 8858, SAO 146620.

Database references
SIMBAD	data

Psi^{2} Aquarii, Latinized from ψ^{2} Aquarii, is the Bayer designation for a star in the equatorial constellation of Aquarius. It is visible to the naked eye with an apparent visual magnitude of 4.4. Based upon parallax measurements made during the Hipparcos mission, the distance to this star is roughly 400 light-years (120 parsecs).

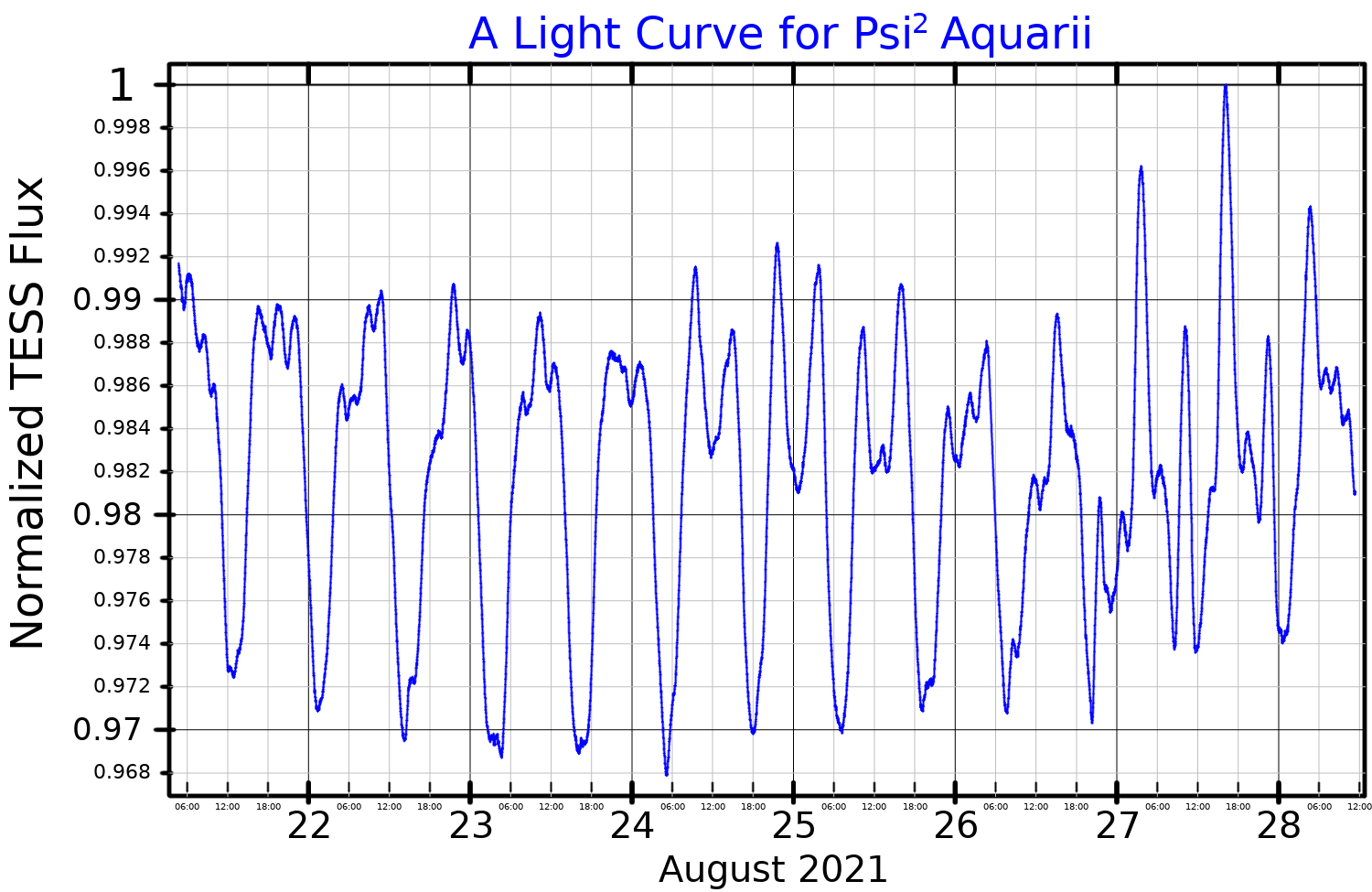
A light curve for Psi^{2} Aquarii, plotted from TESS data

This is a B-type main sequence star with a stellar classification of B5 Vn. The 'n' suffix indicates that the absorption lines in the spectrum are being broadened by Doppler shift from the star's rapid rotation rate. The projected rotational velocity of the star is 341 km/s. Psi^{2} Aquarii is 4.6 times as large as the Sun with an effective temperature of 15,212 K in its outer envelope.

It is a λ Eridani variable, or periodic Be star, with a pulsation cycle lasting 1.073 days. The amplitude of the variation is 0.024 in magnitude.
