= 56 Aquarii =

Star in the constellation Aquarius

Observation data Epoch J2000 Equinox ICRS
- Constellation: Aquarius
- Right ascension: 22^{h} 30^{m} 17.35101^{s}
- Declination: −14° 35′ 08.6373″
- Apparent magnitude (V): 6.36

Characteristics
- Evolutionary stage: main sequence
- Spectral type: B8 Vs
- B−V color index: −0.047±0.007

Astrometry
Radial velocity (R_{v})	−27.6±1.2 km/s
Proper motion (μ)	RA: +34.997 mas/yr Dec.: −33.804 mas/yr
Parallax (π)	4.9951±0.0533 mas
Distance	653 ± 7 ly (200 ± 2 pc)
Absolute magnitude (M_{V})	−0.05

Details
Mass	3.579±0.044 M_{☉}
Radius	3.21±0.07 R_{☉}
Luminosity	229±5 L_{☉}
Surface gravity (log g)	3.869+0.007 −0.008 cgs
Temperature	12,520+48 −53.5 K
Metallicity [Fe/H]	−0.35±0.32 dex
Rotational velocity (v sin i)	23 km/s
Age	292 Myr

Other designations
- 56 Aqr, CD−15°6231, FK5 5985, GC 31428, HD 213236, HIP 111086, HR 8567, SAO 165127

Database references
SIMBAD	data

56 Aquarii, abbreviated 56 Aqr, is a star in the constellation of Aquarius. 56 Aquarii is its Flamsteed designation. It is a sixth magnitude star, having an apparent visual magnitude of 6.36, and thus is a challenge to view with the naked eye. Based upon an annual parallax shift of 5.01 mas, it is located around 653 light years from the Earth. At that distance, the visual magnitude is diminished by an extinction of 0.12 due to interstellar dust. The star is moving closer with a heliocentric radial velocity of −28 km/s. It is a candidate runaway star showing a transverse peculiar velocity of 213.87 km/s.

Houk and Smith-Moore (1978) gave this star a stellar classification of B8 II, matching a B-type bright giant. In contrast, Cowley et al. (1969) found a class of B8 Vs, corresponding to a B-type main-sequence star with narrow ("sharp") absorption lines due to a relatively low projected rotation. Zorec and Royer (2012) modeled it as a dwarf star that is 67% of the way through its main sequence lifespan. It is a chemically peculiar mercury-manganese star, showing abnormally strong absorption lines of mercury and magnesium with weak lines of helium. The star has 3.6 times the mass of the Sun and about 3.2 times the Sun's radius. It is radiating 230 times the Sun's luminosity from its photosphere at an effective temperature of 12,500 K.
