= 91 Aquarii =

Triple star system in the constellation Aquarius

- Location of ψ^{1} Aquarii (circled)

Observation data Epoch J2000.0 Equinox ICRS
- Constellation: Aquarius
- Right ascension: 23^{h} 15^{m} 53.49405^{s}
- Declination: −09° 05′ 15.8450″
- Apparent magnitude (V): +4.248

Characteristics
- Spectral type: K1 III
- U−B color index: +1.035
- B−V color index: +1.104
- R−I color index: 0.56

Astrometry
Radial velocity (R_{v})	−26.07±0.13 km/s
Proper motion (μ)	RA: +369.477 mas/yr Dec.: −16.981 mas/yr
Parallax (π)	22.0924±0.1302 mas
Distance	147.6 ± 0.9 ly (45.3 ± 0.3 pc)
Absolute magnitude (M_{V})	0.919

Details
Mass	0.774±0.150 M_{☉} 1.004±0.175 M_{☉} 1.4±0.1 M_{☉} 1.76±0.21 M_{☉}
Radius	10.8±0.2 R_{☉}
Luminosity	48±3 L_{☉}
Surface gravity (log g)	2.32±0.11 cgs
Temperature	4,631±69 K
Metallicity [Fe/H]	−0.03±0.01 dex
Rotational velocity (v sin i)	1.49±0.45 km/s
Age	1.54±0.46 Gyr; 3.56±0.63 Gyr; 9.2±5.1 Gyr

Other designations
- Psi^{1} Aquarii, ADS 16633, Gl 893.2, WDS J23159-0905
- A: BD−09 6156, FK5 1608, HD 219449, HIP 114855, HR 8841, LTT 9437, SAO 146598
- BC: BD−09 6155, HD 219430, LTT 9434, SAO 146596

Database references
SIMBAD	A
- BC

91 Aquarii is a triple star system in the equatorial constellation of Aquarius. It also bears the Bayer designation Psi^{1} Aquarii (ψ^{1} Aqr, ψ^{1} Aquarii). It is visible to the naked eye with an apparent visual magnitude of +4.248. Parallax measurements yield an estimated distance of around 150 light-years (46 parsecs) from Earth. An extrasolar planet is known to orbit the main star.

== Stellar system ==
91 Aquarii is a triple star system. The primary component, 91 Aqr A, is a giant star with a stellar classification of K1 III. This is an evolved star that has expanded to over 10 times the size of the Sun's size. Its mass and age are uncertain; mass estimates range from 0.77 M_{☉} to 1.8 M_{☉}, while age ranges from 1.5 to 9 billion years. It is radiating 48 times the Sun's luminosity from its outer envelope at an effective temperature of 4,630 K. This gives it the orange-hued glow of a K-type star.

The primary shares a common proper motion with two others stars, 91 Aqr B and C, suggesting that they are physically connected. The latter pair form a binary system located at an angular separation of 52 arcseconds from the primary. They are 10th magnitude stars separated by 0.3 arcseconds from each other.

Component	Apparent magnitude (V)	Spectral type
A	4.22	K0 III
B	9.62	K3 V
C	10.10	

Because it lies near the same line of sight, the binary star system CCDM J23159-0905DE was listed to belong to the 91 Aquarii system according to the CCDM catalogue. However, it is listed as physically unconnected in the WDS catalogue and the pair have a different proper motion than 91 Aquarii. CCDM J23159-0905DE has two components, the 13th magnitude CCDM J23159-0905D 80.4 arcseconds from 91 Aquarii, and the 14th magnitude CCDM J23159-0905E 19.7 arcseconds from 91 Aquarii.

== Planetary system ==
In 2003, the discovery of an extrasolar planet orbiting 91 Aquarii A was announced, but its confirmation was not formally published until 2013.

The 91 Aquarii planetary system
Companion (in order from star)	Mass	Semimajor axis (AU)	Orbital period (days)	Eccentricity	Inclination (°)	Radius
b	>3.234±0.006 M_{J}	0.70093±0.00003	181.152±0.013	0.032±0.002	—	—

== See also ==
- Edasich, Muscida and Libertas, other giant stars with planets
