= 29 Aquarii =

Binary star in the constellation Aquarius

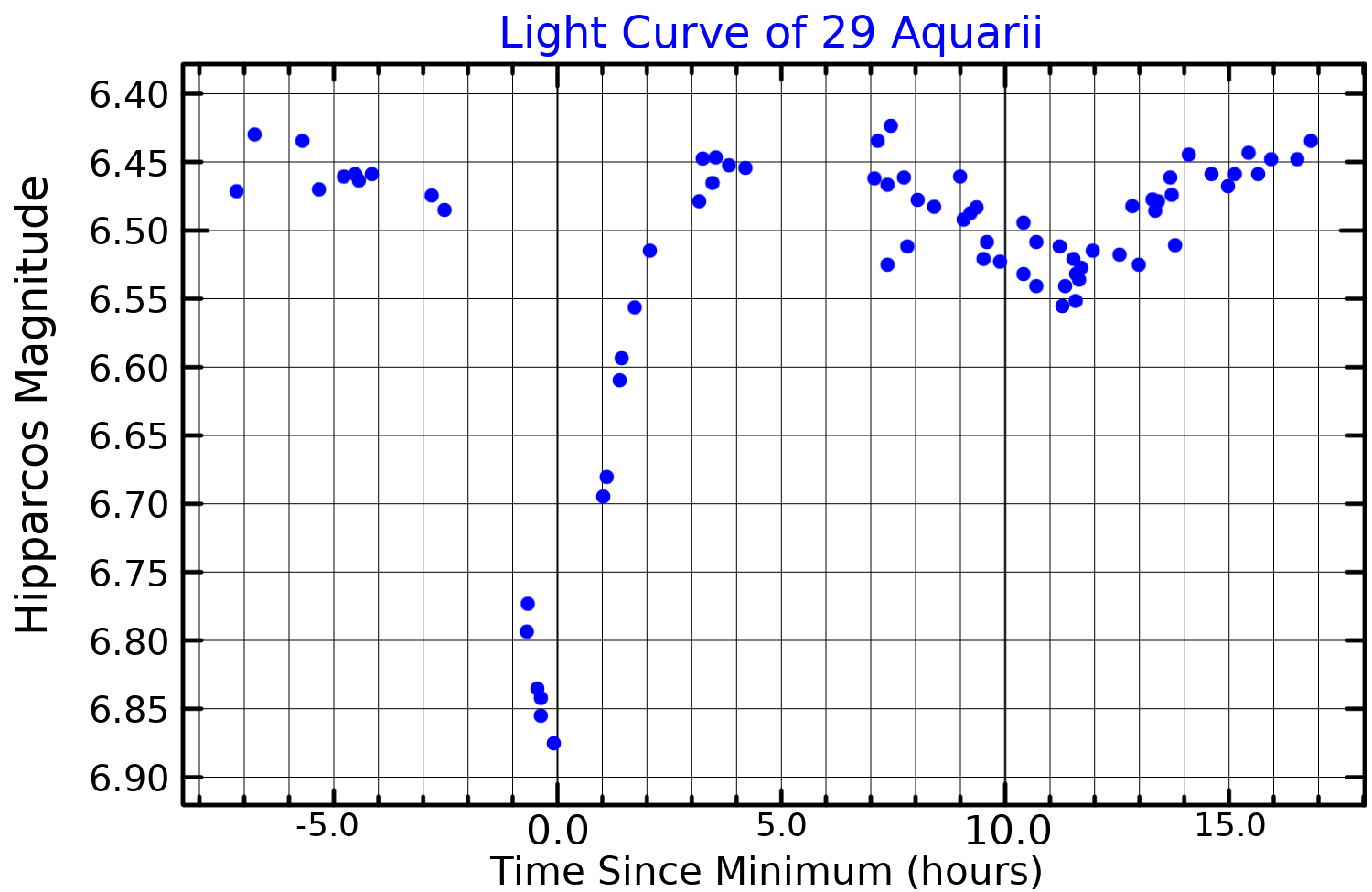
- The light curve of 29 Aquarii, from Hipparcos data

Observation data Epoch J2000 Equinox ICRS
- Constellation: Aquarius
- Right ascension: 22^{h} 02^{m} 26.24845^{s}
- Declination: −16° 57′ 53.3959″
- Apparent magnitude (V): 6.39

Characteristics
- Spectral type: A2 V + K0 III
- B−V color index: 0.447±0.022

Astrometry
Radial velocity (R_{v})	+15.0±4.3 km/s
Proper motion (μ)	RA: +5.292 mas/yr Dec.: +1.256 mas/yr
Parallax (π)	5.5489±0.1285 mas
Distance	590 ± 10 ly (180 ± 4 pc)

Orbit
Period (P)	0.945 d
Eccentricity (e)	0.00
Periastron epoch (T)	2,436,814.418±1.0 JD
Semi-amplitude (K_{1}) (primary)	97.9 km/s

Other designations
- BD−17°6422, HD 209278, HIP 108797, HR 8396, SAO 164830, WDS J22024-1658

Database references
SIMBAD	data

29 Aquarii is a binary star system located around 590 light-years away from the Sun in the equatorial constellation of Aquarius. 29 Aquarii is the Flamsteed designation; the system also bears the variable star designation DX Aquarii. It is a challenge to view with the naked eye, appearing as a dim star with a combined apparent visual magnitude of 6.39. The system is moving further from the Earth with a heliocentric radial velocity of about +15 km/s.

This is a spectroscopic binary system with a close circular orbit taking just 0.945 days to complete. Despite their proximity, this does not appear to be a contact binary system. The orbital plane of the two stars lies near the line of sight, so they form an Algol-type eclipsing binary. The first component of the system is an A-type main-sequence star with a stellar classification of A2 V. Its companion is giant star with a classification of K0 III.

The variability of this system was first noticed in 1965 by W. Strohmeier of Remeis-Observatory in Bamberg, Germany. He later discovered that the variability was caused by a binary companion eclipsing the primary star.
