= 53 Aquarii =

Binary star in the constellation Aquarius

- Location of 53 Aquarii (circled)

Observation data Epoch J2000 Equinox J2000
- Constellation: Aquarius
- Right ascension: 22^{h} 26^{m} 34.2753^{s}
- Declination: −16° 44′ 31.697″
- Apparent magnitude (V): 5.56 (6.35/6.57)

Characteristics
- Spectral type: G1 V + G5 V Fe–0.8 CH–1
- U−B color index: +0.09
- B−V color index: +0.61

Astrometry
Radial velocity (R_{v})	+2.1 km/s
Proper motion (μ)	RA: +200.59 mas/yr Dec.: +14.51 mas/yr
Parallax (π)	49.50±1.23 mas
Distance	66 ± 2 ly (20.2 ± 0.5 pc)
Absolute magnitude (M_{V})	4.05 (4.94/4.87)

Orbit
Primary	53 Aqr A
Name	53 Aqr B
Period (P)	3500 yr
Semi-major axis (a)	14.88″
Eccentricity (e)	0.90
Inclination (i)	44.13°
Longitude of the node (Ω)	294.55°
Periastron epoch (T)	B 2023
Argument of periastron (ω) (secondary)	151.40°

Details

53 Aqr A
Mass	1.01 M_{☉}
Radius	1.11 R_{☉}
Luminosity	1.39 L_{☉}
Surface gravity (log g)	4.46 cgs
Temperature	5,922 K
Metallicity [Fe/H]	−0.10 dex
Rotational velocity (v sin i)	8 km/s
Age	0.18–0.37 Gyr

53 Aqr B
Mass	0.99 M_{☉}
Surface gravity (log g)	4.44 cgs
Temperature	5,811 K
Metallicity [Fe/H]	−0.19 dex
Rotational velocity (v sin i)	9 km/s

Other designations
- GJ 859, HIP 110778.
- 53 Aqr A: BD−17 6521, HD 212698, HR 8545, LTT 9026, SAO 165078.
- 53 Aqr B: BD−17 6520, HD 212697, HR 8544, LTT 9025, SAO 165077.

Database references
SIMBAD	53 Aqr
- 53 Aqr A
- 53 Aqr B

53 Aquarii (abbreviated 53 Aqr) is a binary star system in the equatorial constellation of Aquarius. 53 Aquarii is its Flamsteed designation though the star also bears the Bayer designation of f Aquarii. The combined apparent visual magnitude of the pair is a 5.56, making it just visible to the naked eye in dark suburban skies. Based upon an annual parallax shift of 49.50 milliarcseconds for the first component, this system is located at a distance of approximately 65 light-years (20 parsecs) from Earth.

This is a wide binary star system with a projected separation of 100 astronomical units; indicating that the two stars are at least this distance apart. The primary component is a solar-type main sequence star with a stellar classification of G1 V. It has about 99% of the Sun's mass, 111% of the Sun's radius, and shines with 139% of the luminosity of the Sun. This energy is being emitted from an outer envelope at an effective temperature of 5,922 K, giving it the golden hue of a G-type star. An examination of the primary component with the Spitzer Space Telescope failed to detect any infrared excess that might otherwise be an indication of a circumstellar debris disk.

The companion is a slightly cooler star with an effective temperature of 5,811 K. It has a stellar classification of G5 V Fe–0.8 CH–1, indicating it is a chemically peculiar G-type main sequence star showing an under-abundance of iron and the molecule CH in its spectrum. As of 2008, it has an angular separation of 1.325 arcseconds along a position angle of 30.9° from the primary.

This system is coeval with the Castor Moving Group of stars that share a common motion through space; hence it is a candidate member of that association. This suggests that the system is young; its estimated age is in the range of 180 to 370 million years, based upon the spectrum and X-ray luminosity, respectively.
