= 58 Aquarii =

Triple star in the constellation Aquarius

Observation data Epoch J2000 Equinox ICRS
- Constellation: Aquarius
- Right ascension: 22^{h} 31^{m} 41.31672^{s}
- Declination: −10° 54′ 19.8148″
- Apparent magnitude (V): 6.39

Characteristics
- Evolutionary stage: Main sequence (Aa + Ab); White dwarf (B)
- Spectral type: A9/F0 V + K + WD
- B−V color index: 0.290±0.009

Astrometry
Radial velocity (R_{v})	+4.0±4.3 km/s
Proper motion (μ)	RA: +77.347 mas/yr Dec.: −52.472 mas/yr
Parallax (π)	13.4137±0.1535 mas
Distance	243 ± 3 ly (74.6 ± 0.9 pc)
Absolute magnitude (M_{V})	2.12

Orbit
Primary	Aa
Name	Ab
Period (P)	830±73 days
Semi-major axis (a)	2.3±0.1 AU

Position (relative to A)
Component	B
Angular distance	132″
Projected separation	9,940 AU

Details

Aa
Mass	1.68 M_{☉}
Radius	2.4 R_{☉}
Luminosity	11.73 L_{☉}
Surface gravity (log g)	4.040+0.065 −0.104 cgs
Temperature	6,990 K
Metallicity [Fe/H]	0.014+0.150 −0.120 dex
Rotational velocity (v sin i)	30.0±10.0 km/s
Age	1.4 Gyr

Ab
Mass	0.74 M_{☉}
Radius	0.67 R_{☉}
Temperature	4,540 K

B
Mass	0.70 M_{☉}
Temperature	9,500 K

Other designations
- 58 Aqr, CD−11°5855, GC 31468, HD 213464, HIP 111200, HR 8583, SAO 165147

Database references
SIMBAD	data

58 Aquarii, abbreviated 58 Aqr, is a triple star system in the constellation of Aquarius. 58 Aquarii is its Flamsteed designation. It is a sixth magnitude star with an apparent visual magnitude of 6.39, which means it is a challenge to view with the naked eye. Based upon an annual parallax shift of 13.4 mas, it is located at a distance of 243 light years.

The primary component, named 58 Aquarii Aa, has a stellar classification of A9/F0 V, matching a main sequence star with a spectrum showing mixed traits of an A/F-type. It is a chemically peculiar Am star, showing metallic lines with no magnetic field. The star has 1.7 times the mass of the Sun and 2.4 times the Sun's radius. It is radiating 12 times the Sun's luminosity from its photosphere at an effective temperature of 7,000 K.

The secondary component, named 58 Aquarii Ab, is a K-type dwarf, with around 70% of the Sun's size and an effective temperature around 4,540 K, separated by 2.3 astronomical units from Aa. It was initially uncovered via astrometry from the Hipparcos spacecraft, and later detected via interferometric observations by Waisberg, Ygal and Katz. This inner system will become a common envelope binary, when 58 Aquarii Aa expands in the red giant phase. Mass transfer between components is also expected to occur.

The tertiary component, named 58 Aquarii B, is a widely-separated white dwarf, located at 9,940 astronomical units from the inner pair.
