= 61 Aquarii =

Star in the constellation Aquarius

Observation data Epoch J2000 Equinox ICRS
- Constellation: Aquarius
- Right ascension: 22^{h} 35^{m} 48.80173^{s}
- Declination: −17° 27′ 37.5415″
- Apparent magnitude (V): 6.39

Characteristics
- Spectral type: K4 III
- B−V color index: 1.420±0.015

Astrometry
Radial velocity (R_{v})	−8.1±2.9 km/s
Proper motion (μ)	RA: −29.242 mas/yr Dec.: −41.566 mas/yr
Parallax (π)	6.5274±0.0513 mas
Distance	500 ± 4 ly (153 ± 1 pc)
Absolute magnitude (M_{V})	0.53

Details
Mass	0.572±0.031 M_{☉}
Radius	11.754+0.611 −1.450 R_{☉}
Luminosity	126.56 L_{☉}
Surface gravity (log g)	2.401+0.180 −0.045 cgs
Temperature	4430+141 −53 K
Metallicity [Fe/H]	0.099+0.120 −0.100 dex

Other designations
- 61 Aqr, BD−18°6154, FK5 3810, HD 214028, HIP 111539, SAO 165178

Database references
SIMBAD	data

61 Aquarii, abbreviated 61 Aqr, is an orange-hued star in the zodiac constellation of Aquarius. 61 Aquarii is its Flamsteed designation. It has an apparent visual magnitude of 6.39, which indicates it is a dim star that requires good seeing conditions to view. Based upon an annual parallax shift of 6.53 mas as seen from Earth's orbit, the star is located around 500 light years away. It is moving closer to the Earth with a heliocentric radial velocity of −8 km/s.

This is an evolved K-type giant star with a stellar classification of K4 III, which indicates it has consumed the hydrogen at its core and expanded. It has an estimated 0.57 times the mass of the Sun but with over 11 times the Sun's radius. The star is radiating 127 times the Sun's luminosity from its enlarged photosphere at an effective temperature of 4,430 K.
