= 35 Aquarii =

Star in the constellation Aquarius

Observation data Epoch J2000.0 Equinox ICRS
- Constellation: Aquarius
- Right ascension: 22^{h} 08^{m} 58.99033^{s}
- Declination: −18° 31′ 10.5372″
- Apparent magnitude (V): 5.80

Characteristics
- Spectral type: B2 III
- B−V color index: −0.154±0.006

Astrometry
Radial velocity (R_{v})	−7.2±0.6 km/s
Proper motion (μ)	RA: −0.102 mas/yr Dec.: −8.110 mas/yr
Parallax (π)	1.5115±0.1129 mas
Distance	2,200 ± 200 ly (660 ± 50 pc)

Details
Mass	10.1±1.0 M_{☉}
Luminosity	1,622 L_{☉}
Surface gravity (log g)	3.31±0.10 cgs
Temperature	17,400±300 K
Rotational velocity (v sin i)	10 km/s
Age	22.5±2.6 Myr

Other designations
- 35 Aqr, BD−19°6227, HD 210191, HIP 109332, HR 8439, SAO 164888, WDS J22091-1829

Database references
SIMBAD	data

35 Aquarii is a single star located approximately 2,200 light years away from the Sun in the zodiac constellation of Aquarius. It is visible to the naked eye as a faint, blue-white star with an apparent visual magnitude of 5.80. This object is moving closer to Earth with a heliocentric radial velocity of −7 km/s, and is suspected to be a runaway star, potentially ejected from an open cluster due to a binary–binary interaction.

This star is a blue giant with a stellar classification of B2 III, indicating that it is a massive star that has evolved off the main sequence. With an age of around 22.5 million years, it has a relatively low projected rotational velocity of 10 km/s. The star has a mass of 10 times the mass of the Sun and is radiating 1,622 times the Sun's luminosity from its photosphere at an effective temperature of 17,400 K.
