= Tau2 Aquarii =

Star in the constellation Aquarius

τ^{2} Aquarii
- Location of τ^{2} Aquarii (circled)

Observation data Epoch J2000 Equinox ICRS
- Constellation: Aquarius
- Right ascension: 22^{h} 49^{m} 35.501^{s}
- Declination: −13° 35′ 33.46″
- Apparent magnitude (V): +4.042 (3.98 to 4.04)

Characteristics
- Spectral type: K5 III or M0 III
- U−B color index: +1.948
- B−V color index: +1.566
- Variable type: Suspected

Astrometry
Radial velocity (R_{v})	+1.1±0.8 km/s
Proper motion (μ)	RA: −13.386 mas/yr Dec.: −38.609 mas/yr
Parallax (π)	10.0171±0.1734 mas
Distance	326 ± 6 ly (100 ± 2 pc)
Absolute magnitude (M_{V})	−1.28

Details
Radius	51.5+4.6 −5.5 R_{☉}
Luminosity	614±27 L_{☉}
Surface gravity (log g)	1.63 cgs
Temperature	4,007+232 −166 K

Other designations
- Lintangkumba, τ^{2} Aquarii, τ^{2} Aqr, 71 Aquarii, NSV 14329, BD−14°6354, FK5 861, GC 31836, HD 216032, HIP 112716, HR 8679, SAO 165321, PPM 240808, WDS J22496-1336A

Database references
SIMBAD	data

Tau^{2} Aquarii, also named Lintangkumba /lɪntʌŋkuːmbɑː/, is a solitary star in the equatorial constellation of Aquarius. Its Bayer designation is Latinized from τ^{2} Aquarii, and abbreviated Tau^{2} Aqr or τ^{2} Aqr. This star is visible to the naked eye with an apparent visual magnitude of +4.0. Because the star lies near the ecliptic it is subject to occultations by the Moon. The star is located at a distance of approximately 326 light-years (100 pc) from the Sun based on parallax. It is drifting further away with a radial velocity of about +1.1 km/s.

This is an orange-hued red giant star with a stellar classification of K5 III. After exhausting the supply of hydrogen at its core, the aging star cooled and expanded off the main sequence. It now has 52 times the radius of the Sun and is radiating 614 times the Sun's luminosity from its enlarged photosphere at an effective temperature of 4,007 K. This is a suspected variable star with a brightness that has been measured ranging from visual magnitude 3.98 down to 4.04.

A magnitude 9.94 visual companion to this star was reported by W. Herschel in 1782, and it has the modern discovery code 'H 6 97'. As of 2010, it was located at a wide angular separation of 132.40″ from the brighter star along a position angle of 297°.

Kumba or Kumbha (कुम्भ) is the Indian and Indonesian name for Aquarius. Lintang is Indonesian for a constellation or asterism; in Balinese tradition, Aquarius is known as lintang kumba. The IAU Working Group on Star Names adopted the name Lintangkumba for this star on 22 September 2026.
