= 41 Aquarii =

Double star in the constellation of Aquarius

Observation data Epoch J2000 Equinox J2000
- Constellation: Aquarius
- Right ascension: 22^{h} 14^{m} 18.03271^{s}
- Declination: −21° 04′ 28.4330″
- Apparent magnitude (V): 5.354

Characteristics
- Spectral type: K0 III + F8 V
- U−B color index: +0.465
- B−V color index: +0.834

Astrometry

41 Aqr A
Radial velocity (R_{v})	−24.94±0.13 km/s
Proper motion (μ)	RA: +24.827 mas/yr Dec.: +54.923 mas/yr
Parallax (π)	13.7811±0.1850 mas
Distance	237 ± 3 ly (72.6 ± 1.0 pc)
Proper motion (μ)	RA: +27.266 mas/yr Dec.: +57.272 mas/yr
Parallax (π)	13.5404±0.0719 mas
Distance	241 ± 1 ly (73.9 ± 0.4 pc)

Details

41 Aqr A
Radius	7.88+0.09 −0.13 R_{☉}
Luminosity	33.93±0.53 L_{☉}
Surface gravity (log g)	2.85 cgs
Temperature	4,750 K
Metallicity [Fe/H]	−0.13 dex

41 Aqr B
Radius	1.76+0.29 −0.06 R_{☉}
Luminosity	6.319±0.043 L_{☉}
Temperature	6,899+115 −506 K

Other designations
- 41 Aqr, BD−21°6180, HD 210960, HIP 109786, HR 8480, SAO 190986, WDS J22143-2104

Database references
SIMBAD	data

41 Aquarii is a double star in the equatorial constellation of Aquarius. 41 Aquarii is its Flamsteed designation. It is visible to the naked eye as a dim, orange-hued point of light with a combined apparent visual magnitude of 5.354. The pair are located at a distance of around 239 light-years (73 parsecs) from the Sun based on parallax, but are drifting closer with a radial velocity of –25 km/s.

The brighter component of the pair is a red clump giant star with a stellar classification of K0 III and a magnitude of 5.73. This is an aging star that has exhausted the supply of hydrogen at its core and is now generating energy through core helium fusion. It has eight times the girth of the Sun and is radiating 34 times the luminosity of the Sun at an effective temperature of 4,750 K.

At an angular separation of 5.148 arcseconds, the fainter companion is an F-type main sequence star with a magnitude 7.16 and a classification of F8 V. It has 1.8 times the Sun's radius and is radiating six times the Sun's luminosity from its photosphere at 6,899 K.
