= 70 Aquarii =

Star in the constellation Aquarius

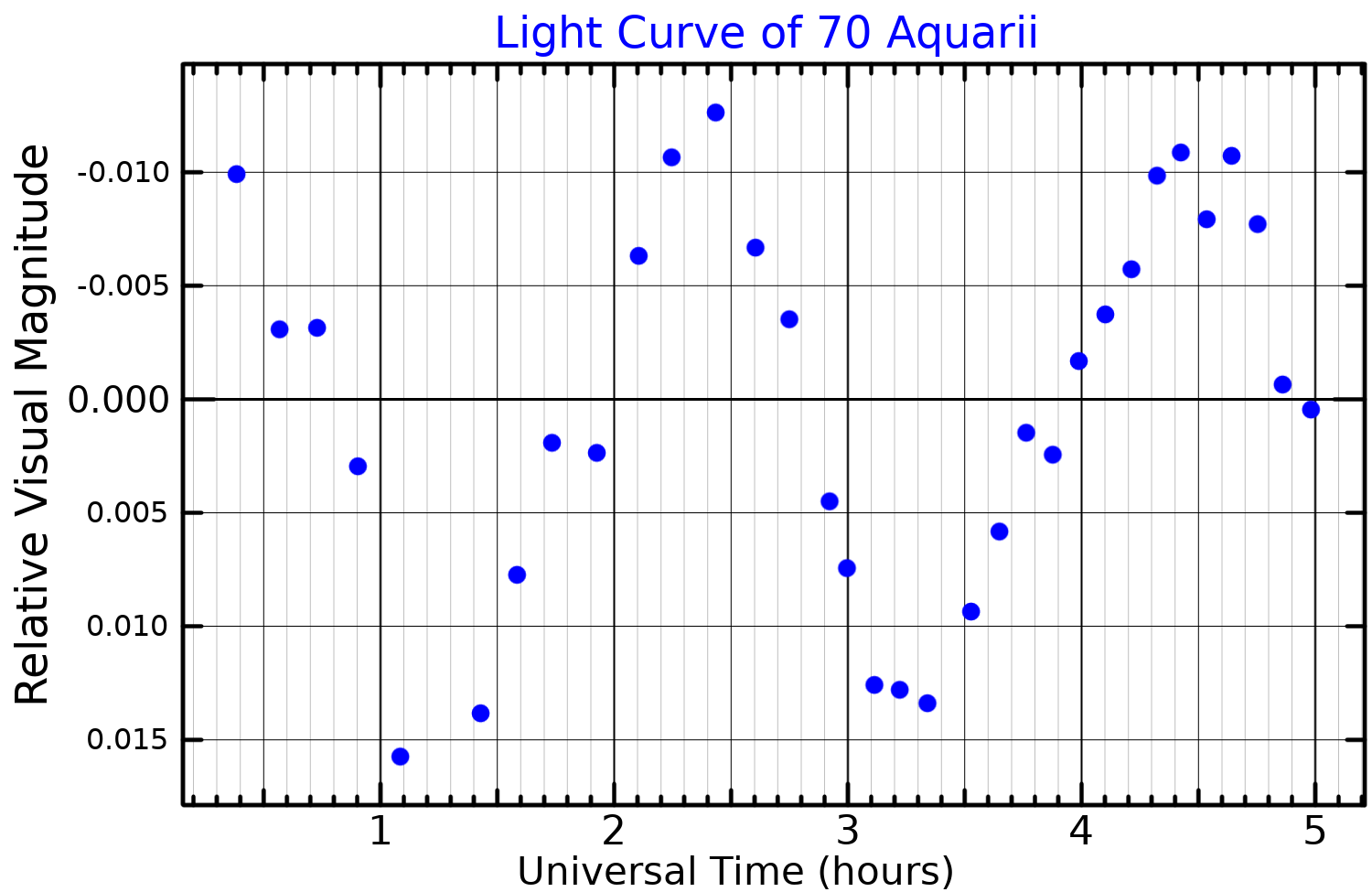
- The visual band light curve of 70 Aquarii, adapted from Weiss (1977)

Observation data Epoch J2000 Equinox ICRS
- Constellation: Aquarius
- Right ascension: 22^{h} 48^{m} 30.21027^{s}
- Declination: −10° 33′ 19.7178″
- Apparent magnitude (V): 6.19

Characteristics
- Evolutionary stage: main sequence
- Spectral type: F0 V
- B−V color index: +0.28
- Variable type: δ Sct

Astrometry
Radial velocity (R_{v})	−5.8 km/s
Proper motion (μ)	RA: +31.694 mas/yr Dec.: +8.116 mas/yr
Parallax (π)	7.8081±0.0352 mas
Distance	418 ± 2 ly (128.1 ± 0.6 pc)
Absolute magnitude (M_{V})	+0.88

Details
Radius	4.17+0.17 −0.23 R_{☉}
Luminosity	44.8±0.5 L_{☉}
Surface gravity (log g)	3.48 cgs
Temperature	7,314+187 −144 K
Metallicity [Fe/H]	0.02±0.15 dex
Rotational velocity (v sin i)	110 km/s

Other designations
- 70 Aqr, BD−11°5923, FK5 3825, HD 215874, HIP 112615, HR 8676, SAO 165308

Database references
SIMBAD	data

70 Aquarii is a variable star located 425 light years away from the Sun in the equatorial constellation of Aquarius. It has the variable star designation FM Aquarii; 70 Aquarii is the Flamsteed designation. It is near the lower limit of visibility to the naked eye, appearing as a dim, yellow-white hued star with a baseline apparent visual magnitude of 6.19. This star is moving closer to the Earth with a heliocentric radial velocity of –5.8 km/s.

Werner Wolfgang Weiss discovered that 70 Aquarii was a variable star in 1977. It was given its variable star designation in 1981.

This is an F-type main-sequence star with a stellar classification of F0 V. Located in the lower part of the instability strip, it is a Delta Scuti-type variable that ranges in brightness from magnitude 6.16 down to 6.19 with a period of 125 minutes (0.087 days). The star has a high rate of spin, showing a projected rotational velocity of 110 km/s. It has four times the Sun's radius and is radiating 45 times the luminosity of the Sun from its photosphere at an effective temperature of around 7,314 K.
