= Omega2 Aquarii =

Star in the constellation Aquarius

Omega^{2} Aquarii
- Location of ω^{2} Aquarii (circled)

Observation data Epoch J2000 Equinox ICRS
- Constellation: Aquarius
- Right ascension: 23^{h} 42^{m} 43.345^{s}
- Declination: −14° 32′ 41.66″
- Apparent magnitude (V): 4.49

Characteristics
- Spectral type: B9 V + A5V
- U−B color index: −0.12
- B−V color index: −0.04

Astrometry
Radial velocity (R_{v})	+3.2±2.3 km/s
Proper motion (μ)	RA: +98.578 mas/yr Dec.: −66.231 mas/yr
Parallax (π)	20.8948±0.1589 mas
Distance	156 ± 1 ly (47.9 ± 0.4 pc)
Absolute magnitude (M_{V})	+1.20

Details

A
Mass	2.6^{+0.15}_{−0.14} M_{☉}
Radius	1.94±0.06 R_{☉}
Luminosity	37 L_{☉}
Surface gravity (log g)	4.22±0.03 cgs
Temperature	10,504±91 K
Rotation	10.6546 h
Rotational velocity (v sin i)	148 km/s
Age	109^{+90}_{−70} Myr

Other designations
- ω^{2} Aqr, 105 Aquarii, BD−15 6476, FK5 894, GC 32931, GJ 9836, HD 222661, HIP 116971, HR 8988, SAO 165842, PPM 242001, WDS J23427-1433A

Database references
SIMBAD	data

Omega^{2} Aquarii is a star system in the equatorial constellation of Aquarius. Its name is a Bayer designation that is Latinised from ω^{2} Aquarii, and abbreviated Omega^{2} Aqr or ω^{2} Aqr. The system can be seen with the naked eye as a faint point of light, having an apparent visual magnitude of 4.49. The approximate distance to this star, 149 light-years (46 parsecs), is known from parallax measurements.

This is a B-type main-sequence star with a stellar classification of B9 V. In 1953, astronomers H. L. Johnson and W. W. Morgan selected it as the MK standard for stars of class B9.5V. It has an estimated age of 109 million years and is spinning rapidly with a projected rotational velocity of 148 km/s, giving it a rotation period of 10.6546 h. The star has 2.6 times the Sun's mass and nearly double the radius of the Sun. It is radiating 37 times the luminosity of the Sun from its photosphere at an effective temperature of 10,504 K, giving it the blue-white hue of a B-type star.

In 1983, this was catalogued as a spectroscopic binary star system with components classed B9V and B9.5V. However, a 2012 survey by R. Chini et al found the star to have a constant radial velocity. There is a companion star at an angular separation of 5.7 arcseconds that shares a common proper motion with the primary. It is an A-type main-sequence star with a visual magnitude of 9.5. This system is among the 100 strongest stellar X-ray sources within 163 light-years (50 parsecs) of the Sun. It is emitting an X-ray luminosity of 1.2×10^{30} erg·s^{−1}. The source for this X-ray emission is unknown.
