= 49 Aquarii =

Star in the constellation Aquarius

Observation data Epoch J2000 Equinox ICRS
- Constellation: Aquarius
- Right ascension: 22^{h} 23^{m} 30.84904^{s}
- Declination: −24° 45′ 45.5865″
- Apparent magnitude (V): 5.53

Characteristics
- Evolutionary stage: red clump
- Spectral type: K0 III CN II
- B−V color index: 0.979±0.003

Astrometry
Radial velocity (R_{v})	−12.97±0.07 km/s
Proper motion (μ)	RA: +98.380 mas/yr Dec.: −2.909 mas/yr
Parallax (π)	12.2800±0.0965 mas
Distance	266 ± 2 ly (81.4 ± 0.6 pc)
Absolute magnitude (M_{V})	1.01

Details
Mass	2.18±0.14 M_{☉}
Radius	9.10±0.51 R_{☉}
Luminosity	50.1+11.6 −9.4 L_{☉}
Surface gravity (log g)	2.85±0.09 cgs
Temperature	4,954±24 K
Metallicity [Fe/H]	+0.05±0.03 dex
Rotational velocity (v sin i)	1.42±0.45 km/s
Age	950±210 Myr

Other designations
- 49 Aqr, CD−25°15905, HD 212271, HIP 110529, HR 8529, SAO 191105

Database references
SIMBAD	data

49 Aquarii, abbreviated 49 Aqr, is a star in the zodiac constellation of Aquarius. 49 Aquarii is its Flamsteed designation. It is a dim star with an apparent visual magnitude of 5.53. The distance to 49 Aqr, as determined from its annual parallax shift of 12.28 mas, is 266 light years. It is moving closer to the Earth with a heliocentric radial velocity of −13 km/s.

This is an aging K-type giant star with a stellar classification of K0 III CN II. It shows a spectral anomaly with the absorption lines of cyanogen (CN). This is a red clump giant, indicating that it is generating energy through the helium fusion at its core. It is around 950 million years old with 2.2 times the mass of the Sun and has expanded to nine times the Sun's radius. It is radiating 50 times the Sun's luminosity from its enlarged photosphere at an effective temperature of 4,954 K.
