= Upsilon Aquarii =

Star in the constellation Aquarius

- Location of υ Aquarii (circled)

Observation data Epoch J2000 Equinox ICRS
- Constellation: Aquarius
- Right ascension: 22^{h} 34^{m} 41.636^{s}
- Declination: −20° 42′ 29.58″
- Apparent magnitude (V): +5.21

Characteristics
- Evolutionary stage: main sequence
- Spectral type: F7 V
- B−V color index: +0.44

Astrometry
Radial velocity (R_{v})	−2.28±0.51 km/s
Proper motion (μ)	RA: +221.185 mas/yr Dec.: −147.090 mas/yr
Parallax (π)	43.4396±0.0828 mas
Distance	75.1 ± 0.1 ly (23.02 ± 0.04 pc)
Absolute magnitude (M_{V})	+3.44

Details

A
Mass	1.32^{+0.08}_{−0.04} M_{☉}
Radius	1.45±0.02 R_{☉}
Luminosity	3.61^{+0.16}_{−0.14} L_{☉}
Surface gravity (log g)	4.27±0.09 cgs
Temperature	6,606^{+52}_{−46} K
Metallicity [Fe/H]	0.08 dex
Rotational velocity (v sin i)	34.9 km/s
Age	0.25+0.75 −0.05 to 1.69+0.62 −1.68 Gyr

Other designations
- υ Aquarii, υ Aqr, 59 Aquarii, BD−21 6251, FK5 849, GC 31516, GJ 863.2, GJ 9789, HD 213845, HIP 111449, HR 8592, SAO 191235, PPM 273980

Database references
SIMBAD	data

Upsilon Aquarii is a binary star system in the equatorial constellation of Aquarius. Its name is a Bayer designation that is Latinized from υ Aquarii, and abbreviated Upsilon Aqr or υ Aqr. This star is faintly visible to the naked eye with an apparent visual magnitude of 5.21. Parallax measurements give a distance estimate of 75.1 light-years (23.0 parsecs) from Earth. This is a high proper-motion star that is drifting closer to the Sun with a radial velocity of –2.3 km/s. It is part of the Hercules-Lyra association of co-moving stars.

The primary component is an F-type main sequence star with a stellar classification of F7 V. Age estimates range from 250 million to 1.7 billion years old, and it is spinning with a projected rotational velocity of 35 km/s. The star has 1.32 times the mass of the Sun and 1.45 times the Sun's radius. It is radiating 3.6 times the Sun's luminosity from its photosphere at an effective temperature of 6,606 K, giving it the yellow-white hue of an F-type star.

The star displays an excess of near infrared radiation, suggesting it has a circumstellar disk of dusty debris. This disk has a mean temperature of 75±17 K and is orbiting at an estimated radius of 84±41 AU. A faint stellar companion was detected in 2007 at the Gemini Observatory, with a separation of 6.09″±0.03″ from the primary. This is equivalent to a physical projected separation of 139 AU, which yields an estimated orbital period of ~1,330 years. The debris disk is orbiting close to the dynamically unstable region of this system.

As of 2024, the NASA Exoplanet Exploration Program has deemed this star one of the "most accessible to survey for potentially habitable exoplanets with the Habitable Worlds Observatory".
