= 45 Aquarii =

Star in the constellation Aquarius

Observation data Epoch J2000.0 Equinox ICRS
- Constellation: Aquarius
- Right ascension: 22^{h} 19^{m} 00.741^{s}
- Declination: −13° 18′ 17.97″
- Apparent magnitude (V): 5.96

Characteristics
- Spectral type: K0 III
- B−V color index: 1.075±0.004

Astrometry
Radial velocity (R_{v})	+30.0±2.9 km/s
Proper motion (μ)	RA: +73.431 mas/yr Dec.: −8.823 mas/yr
Parallax (π)	9.8323±0.0438 mas
Distance	332 ± 1 ly (101.7 ± 0.5 pc)
Absolute magnitude (M_{V})	0.69

Details
Radius	10.42+0.38 −1.46 R_{☉}
Luminosity	49.8±0.6 L_{☉}
Temperature	4,750±374 K

Other designations
- 45 Aqr, BD−14°6255, GC 31199, HD 211676, HIP 110179, HR 8508, SAO 164996

Database references
SIMBAD	data

45 Aquarii is a star in the zodiac constellation of Aquarius. 45 Aquarii is its Flamsteed designation. It has an apparent visual magnitude of 5.96, which is bright enough to be dimly visible to the naked eye. The distance to this star is 332 light-years based on parallax measurements, and it is drifting further away with a heliocentric radial velocity of +30 km/s.

The stellar classification of 45 Aquarii is K0 III, matching an evolved K-type giant star that has consumed the hydrogen at its core and expanded. It has an estimated 10 times the radius of the Sun and is radiating 50 times the Sun's luminosity at an effective temperature of 4,750 K.
