= 64 Aquarii =

Star in the constellation Aquarius

Observation data Epoch J2000 Equinox J2000
- Constellation: Aquarius
- Right ascension: 22^{h} 39^{m} 16.03872^{s}
- Declination: −10° 01′ 40.1750″
- Apparent magnitude (V): 6.93

Characteristics
- Spectral type: G2/3 IV/V
- B−V color index: 0.619±0.009

Astrometry
Radial velocity (R_{v})	+10.7±0.5 km/s
Proper motion (μ)	RA: −60.940 mas/yr Dec.: +3.803 mas/yr
Parallax (π)	10.4508±0.1554 mas
Distance	312 ± 5 ly (96 ± 1 pc)
Absolute magnitude (M_{V})	2.75

Details
Mass	1.45±0.06 M_{☉}
Radius	2.78±0.07 R_{☉}
Luminosity	13.133±0.225 L_{☉}
Surface gravity (log g)	3.708±0.013 cgs
Temperature	5,926±97 K
Metallicity [Fe/H]	−0.02±0.11 dex
Rotational velocity (v sin i)	8.75 km/s
Age	2.63±0.26 Gyr

Other designations
- 64 Aqr, BD−10°5963, GC 31614, HD 214572, HIP 111843, SAO 165217

Database references
SIMBAD	data

64 Aquarii is a star located 312 light years away from the Sun in the zodiac constellation of Aquarius. 64 Aquarii is its Flamsteed designation. With an apparent visual magnitude of 6.93, it is too faint to be readily visible to the naked eye. The star is moving further from the Earth with a heliocentric radial velocity of +11 km/s.

The stellar classification for this star is G2/3 IV/V, which indicates the spectrum displays mixed traits of a G-type main-sequence star and a more evolved subgiant star. It is 2.6 billion years old and is spinning with a projected rotational velocity of 8.75 km/s. The star has 1.45 times the mass of the Sun and 2.8 times the Sun's radius. It is radiating 13 times the luminosity of the Sun from its photosphere at an effective temperature of 5,926 K.
