= 100 Aquarii =

Star in the constellation Aquarius

Observation data Epoch J2000 Equinox ICRS
- Constellation: Aquarius
- Right ascension: 23^{h} 31^{m} 42.03824^{s}
- Declination: −21° 22′ 10.0640″
- Apparent magnitude (V): 6.24

Characteristics
- Evolutionary stage: main sequence
- Spectral type: F0 V
- B−V color index: 0.319±0.008

Astrometry
Radial velocity (R_{v})	−8.0±7.4 km/s
Proper motion (μ)	RA: +0.080 mas/yr Dec.: +5.503 mas/yr
Parallax (π)	13.4715±0.0632 mas
Distance	242 ± 1 ly (74.2 ± 0.3 pc)
Absolute magnitude (M_{V})	1.83

Details
Mass	1.83±0.03 M_{☉}
Radius	2.51+0.41 −0.15 R_{☉}
Luminosity	15.84+1.27 −1.17 L_{☉}
Temperature	7,063±49 K
Rotational velocity (v sin i)	123 km/s

Other designations
- 100 Aqr, BD−22°6141, HD 221357, HIP 116118, HR 8932, SAO 191970

Database references
SIMBAD	data

100 Aquarii is a star in the zodiac constellation of Aquarius. The designation is from the star catalogue of English astronomer John Flamsteed, first published in 1712. It is near the lower limit of visibility to the naked eye, appearing as a dim, yellow-white hued star with an apparent visual magnitude of 6.24. The heliocentric radial velocity is poorly constrained, but the star appears to be moving closer to the Earth at the rate of around −8 km/s.

This is an ordinary F-type main-sequence star with a stellar classification of F0 V. The star has a high rate of spin, showing a projected rotational velocity of 123 km/s. It has 1.8 times the mass of the Sun and 2.5 times the Sun's radius. The star is radiating 16 times the luminosity of the Sun from its photosphere at an effective temperature of 7,063 K.
