= 77 Aquarii =

Star in the constellation of Aquarius

Observation data Epoch J2000 Equinox ICRS
- Constellation: Aquarius
- Right ascension: 22^{h} 54^{m} 45.47009^{s}
- Declination: −16° 16′ 19.0505″
- Apparent magnitude (V): 5.55

Characteristics
- Evolutionary stage: giant
- Spectral type: K1 III
- U−B color index: +1.089
- B−V color index: +1.104
- Variable type: suspected

Astrometry
| Radial velocity (R_{v}) | −34.59±0.16 km/s |
| Proper motion (μ) | RA: −222.505 mas/yr Dec.: −88.355 mas/yr |
| Parallax (π) | 24.1777±0.1211 mas |
| Distance | 134.9 ± 0.7 ly (41.4 ± 0.2 pc) |
| Absolute magnitude (M_{V}) | 2.46 |

Details
| Mass | 1.14 M_{☉} |
| Radius | 5.79+0.22 −0.21 R_{☉} |
| Luminosity | 13.347±0.085 L_{☉} |
| Surface gravity (log g) | 2.8 cgs |
| Temperature | 4,583+86 −83 K |
| Metallicity [Fe/H] | +0.03 dex |
| Rotational velocity (v sin i) | 3.9 km/s |
| Age | 7.61 Gyr |

Other designations
- 77 Aqr, NSV 14358, BD−17°6619, HD 216640, HIP 113148, HR 8711, SAO 165376

Database references
| SIMBAD | data |

77 Aquarii is a single star located 135 light years away from the Sun in the equatorial constellation of Aquarius. 77 Aquarii is its Flamsteed designation. It is visible to the naked eye as a dim star with a baseline apparent visual magnitude of 5.55. The star is moving closer to the Earth with a heliocentric radial velocity of −35 km/s.

At the estimated age of 7.61 billion years old, this is an aging giant star with a stellar classification of K1 III. It is a suspected variable star that ranges in brightness from a maximum of magnitude 5.53 down to 5.60. 77 Aquarii has 1.14 times the mass of the Sun and, after exhausting the hydrogen at its core, has expanded to six times the Sun's radius. It is radiating 13.3 times the Sun's luminosity from its photosphere at an effective temperature of 4,581 K, giving it the orange-hued glow of a K-type star.
