= 97 Aquarii =

Binary star in the constellation Aquarius

Observation data Epoch J2000 Equinox J2000
- Constellation: Aquarius
- Right ascension: 23^{h} 22^{m} 39.17113^{s}
- Declination: −15° 02′ 21.6245″
- Apparent magnitude (V): 5.20 (5.59/6.72)

Characteristics
- Spectral type: A2 V + A7 V
- U−B color index: +0.10
- B−V color index: +0.20

Astrometry
Radial velocity (R_{v})	−12 km/s
Proper motion (μ)	RA: +117.00 mas/yr Dec.: +16.48 mas/yr
Parallax (π)	15.30±0.79 mas
Distance	210 ± 10 ly (65 ± 3 pc)

Orbit
Period (P)	64.62 yr
Semi-major axis (a)	0.408″
Eccentricity (e)	0.140
Inclination (i)	77.6°
Longitude of the node (Ω)	276.3°
Periastron epoch (T)	1941.29
Argument of periastron (ω) (secondary)	354.6°

Details
Rotational velocity (v sin i)	175 km/s

Other designations
- BD−15°6406, HD 220278, HIP 115404, HR 8890, SAO 165658.

Database references
SIMBAD	data

97 Aquarii (abbreviated 97 Aqr) is a binary star system in the equatorial constellation of Aquarius. 97 Aquarii is the Flamsteed designation. The combined apparent visual magnitude of the system is 5.20; the brighter star is magnitude 5.59 while the companion is magnitude 6.72. Based upon an annual parallax shift of 15.30 milliarcseconds, this system is at a distance of around 210 light-years (64 parsecs) from Earth.

The two stars in this system orbit each other over a period of 64.62 years at an eccentricity of 0.14. Both are A-type main sequence stars; the primary has a stellar classification of A2 V while its companion is A7 V. Their composite spectrum shows the properties of a Lambda Boötis star, which means it displays peculiar abundances of certain elements.
