= 74 Aquarii =

Triple star system in the constellation Aquarius

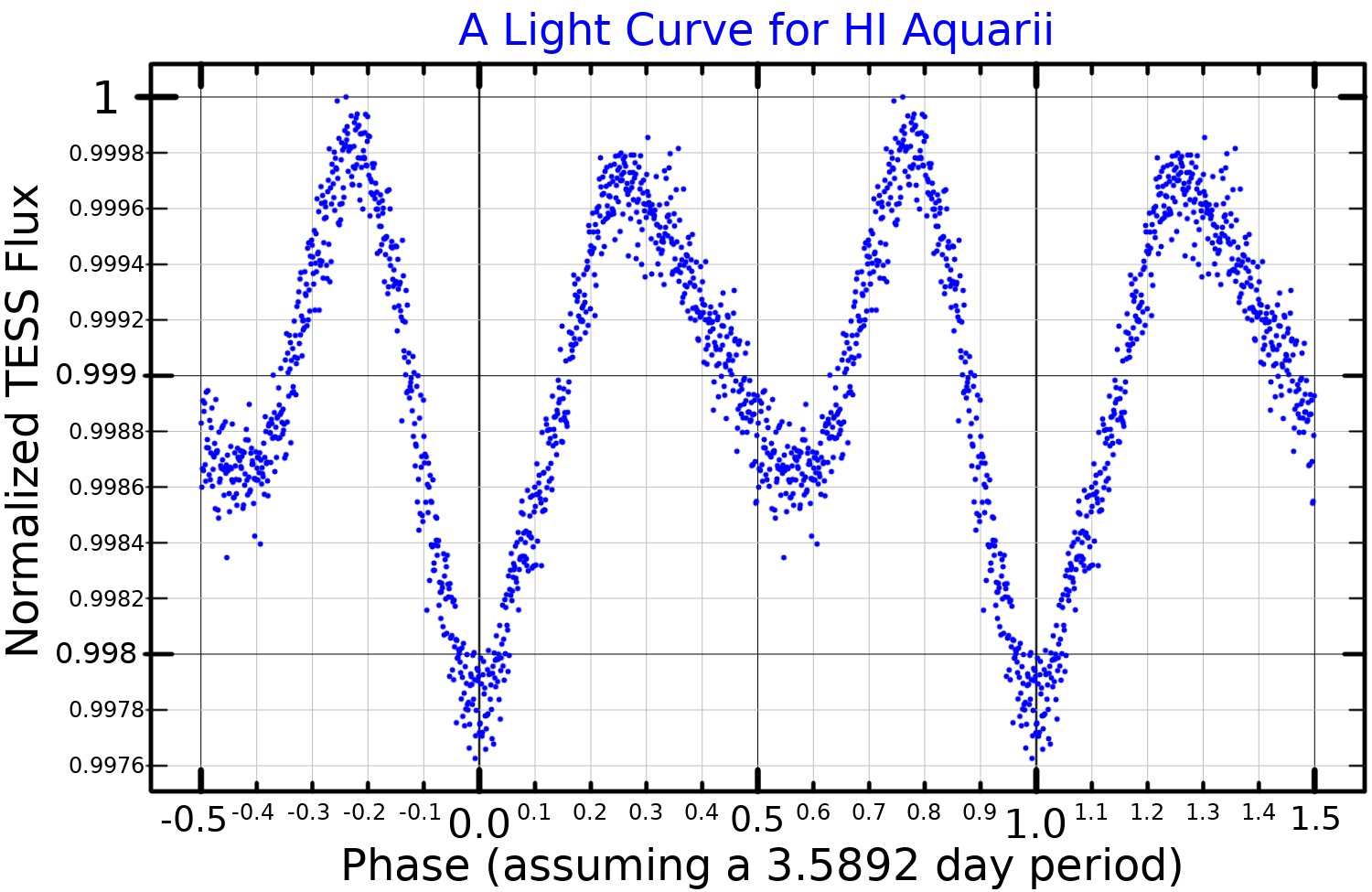
- A light curve for HI Aquarii, plotted from TESS data

Observation data Epoch J2000 Equinox ICRS
- Constellation: Aquarius
- Right ascension: 22^{h} 53^{m} 28.70492^{s}
- Declination: −11° 36′ 59.4532″
- Apparent magnitude (V): 5.8

Characteristics
- Spectral type: B8IV/V (B9pHgMn))
- U−B color index: −0.245
- B−V color index: −0.082
- Variable type: a^{2} CVn

Astrometry
| Proper motion (μ) | RA: +21.539 mas/yr Dec.: +2.282 mas/yr |
| Parallax (π) | 5.5008±0.6556 mas |
| Distance | approx. 590 ly (approx. 180 pc) |
| Absolute magnitude (M_{V}) | −1.19 |

Orbit
| Primary | 74 Aquarii A |
| Name | 74 Aquarii B |
| Period (P) | 9.479±0.044 yr |
| Semi-major axis (a) | 0.0460±0.0061″ |
| Eccentricity (e) | 0.862±0.029 |
| Inclination (i) | 29.8±17.4° |
| Longitude of the node (Ω) | 40.9±20.3° |
| Periastron epoch (T) | 2010.039±0.134 |
| Argument of periastron (ω) (secondary) | 70.7±16.1° |

Orbit
| Primary | 74 Aquarii Aa |
| Name | 74 Aquarii Ab |
| Period (P) | 3.429616±0.000004 d |
| Eccentricity (e) | 0.05±0.02 |
| Periastron epoch (T) | 2452909.150±0.007 JD |
| Argument of periastron (ω) (secondary) | 86.5±0.8° |
| Semi-amplitude (K_{1}) (primary) | 95±2 km/s |
| Semi-amplitude (K_{2}) (secondary) | 113±2 km/s |

Details

Aa
| Mass | 2.72 M_{☉} |
| Rotational velocity (v sin i) | 20 km/s |

Ab
| Mass | 2.53 M_{☉} |

B
| Mass | 3.11 M_{☉} |

Other designations
- HI Aqr, BD−12 6371, HD 216494, HIP 113031, HR 8704, SAO 165359

Database references
| SIMBAD | data |

74 Aquarii (abbreviated 74 Aqr) is a triple star system in the constellation of Aquarius. 74 Aquarii is its Flamsteed designation and it also bears the variable star designation HI Aquarii. The combined apparent visual magnitude is 5.8, although it is very slightly variable, and it is located at a distance of 590 light-years (180 parsecs) from Earth.

Jean Manfroid and Gautier Mathys reported that 74 Aquarii is a variable star in 1985. Based on that result it was given its variable star designation in 1987.

== Visual binary ==
74 Aquarii is a double star with the two components separated by about 0.1″. The two components are referred to as A and B or AB and C in different publications. The pair form a binary with a period of 9.5 years at a typical angular separation of 0.046″, but the orbit is highly eccentric. In 2010, this component was at an angular separation of 0.069 arcseconds along a position angle of 285.9°. This is equivalent to a projected separation of 13.9±2.4 AU.

== Spectroscopic binary ==
The primary star of the visual pair is a double-lined spectroscopic binary, where the presence of both components is revealed from the Doppler shift of their spectral lines, meaning 74 Aquarii is a triple system. The spectroscopic binary was discovered and the orbit calculated by Richard J. Wolff of the University of Hawaii in 1974. A refined orbit was calculated in 2004 by Italian astronomers Giovanni Catanzaro and Paolo Leto. The orbital period is 3.4 days and the orbit is nearly circular.

== Components ==
The three stars have a combined spectral type of B8 or B9 and all three are thought to be similar. It is unclear whether the stars are on the main sequence, subgiants, or giant stars. The two visual components are both chemically peculiar stars, the brighter of the two being a mercury-manganese star and the fainter an Ap/Bp star with an excess of mercury. 74 Aquarii is an α^{2} CVn variable star, with a total amplitude of just 0.01 magnitudes, and a period of 3.5892 days.
