= Omega1 Aquarii =

Binary star in the constellation Aquarius

Omega^{1} Aquarii
- Location of ω^{1} Aquarii (circled)

Observation data Epoch J2000 Equinox ICRS
- Constellation: Aquarius
- Right ascension: 23^{h} 39^{m} 47.069^{s}
- Declination: −14° 13′ 19.75″
- Apparent magnitude (V): 4.96

Characteristics
- Evolutionary stage: Main sequence
- Spectral type: A7 IV (A3V + K2V)
- B−V color index: +0.25

Astrometry
Radial velocity (R_{v})	–2 km/s
Proper motion (μ)	RA: +50.434 mas/yr Dec.: −49.097 mas/yr
Parallax (π)	24.9012±0.6158 mas
Distance	131 ± 3 ly (40.2 ± 1.0 pc)
Absolute magnitude (M_{V})	+1.78

Details

ω^{1} Aqr
Mass	1.88±0.04 M_{☉} 1.72 M_{☉}
Radius	2.05 R_{☉}
Luminosity	17.5±1.8 L_{☉}
Surface gravity (log g)	3.88 cgs
Temperature	7,516±52 K
Metallicity [Fe/H]	−0.07 dex
Rotational velocity (v sin i)	105 km/s
Age	790 Myr; 600 Myr

ω^{1} Aqr B
Mass	0.85 M_{☉}
Radius	0.77 R_{☉}

Other designations
- ω^{1} Aqr, 102 Aquarii, BD−15 6471, GC 32873, HD 222345, HIP 116758, HR 8968, SAO 165818, PPM 241928

Database references
SIMBAD	data

Omega^{1} Aquarii is a binary star system in the equatorial constellation of Aquarius. Its name is a Bayer designation that is Latinized from ω^{1} Aquarii, and abbreviated Omega^{1} Aqr or ω^{1} Aqr. With an apparent visual magnitude of 4.96, this star is faintly visible to the naked eye in skies not significantly affected by light pollution. The distance to this star can be estimated from the parallax as approximately 138 light-years (42 parsecs).

The stellar classification of this star is A3V, matching an A-type main-sequence star. The star is about 600 million years old and is spinning rapidly with a projected rotational velocity of 105 km/s. It has 1.9 times the mass of the Sun and 2.0 times the Sun's radius. Omega^{1} Aquarii is radiating 17.5 times the Sun's luminosity from its photosphere at an effective temperature of 7,516 K.

Previously thought to be a single star, in 2022 it was discovered to have a smaller companion, making it a binary star system. The secondary cmponent has a class of K2V, matching a K-type main sequence star with 85% of the mass and 77% of the radius of the Sun. It has a projected physical separation of about 1 astronomical unit from the primary star, and their predicted orbital period is 239 days.
