= 94 Aquarii =

Triple star system in the constellation Aquarius

Observation data Epoch J2000 Equinox ICRS
- Constellation: Aquarius
- 94 Aquarii A (Aa/Ab)
- Right ascension: 23^{h} 19^{m} 06.7257^{s}
- Declination: −13° 27′ 31.615″
- Apparent magnitude (V): 5.19
- 94 Aquarii B
- Right ascension: 23^{h} 19^{m} 06.5609^{s}
- Declination: −13° 27′ 18.904″
- Apparent magnitude (V): 7.52

Characteristics

94 Aqr A
- Spectral type: G8.5 IV + K V
- U−B color index: +0.42
- B−V color index: +0.79

94 Aqr B
- Spectral type: K2 V
- U−B color index: +0.60
- B−V color index: +0.88

Astrometry

94 Aquarii A (Aa/Ab)
Radial velocity (R_{v})	+17.60±0.07 km/s
Proper motion (μ)	RA: 258.738±0.944 mas/yr Dec.: −73.014±0.928 mas/yr
Parallax (π)	44.8996±0.5572 mas
Distance	72.6 ± 0.9 ly (22.3 ± 0.3 pc)
Absolute magnitude (M_{V})	+3.52/+6.52

94 Aquarii B
Proper motion (μ)	RA: 306.702±0.107 mas/yr Dec.: −104.633±0.086 mas/yr
Parallax (π)	44.5152±0.0550 mas
Distance	73.27 ± 0.09 ly (22.46 ± 0.03 pc)
Absolute magnitude (M_{V})	+5.92

Orbit
Primary	94 Aquarii Aa
Name	94 Aquarii Ab
Period (P)	6.321±0.010 yr
Semi-major axis (a)	0.189±0.002″
Eccentricity (e)	0.173±0.020
Inclination (i)	44.5±1.0°
Longitude of the node (Ω)	341.9±1.5°
Periastron epoch (T)	2012.301
Argument of periastron (ω) (secondary)	28.3°

Details

94 Aquarii Aa
Mass	1.22±0.03 M_{☉}
Radius	2.06±0.03 R_{☉}
Luminosity	3.30±0.06 L_{☉}
Surface gravity (log g)	3.88 cgs
Temperature	5,461 K
Metallicity [Fe/H]	+0.23 dex
Rotational velocity (v sin i)	8 km/s
Age	6.2±0.2 Gyr

94 Aquarii Ab
Mass	0.81±0.04 M_{☉}
Radius	0.85±0.03 R_{☉}
Temperature	4,670 or 4,970 K

94 Aquarii B
Surface gravity (log g)	4.54 cgs
Temperature	5,136 K
Metallicity [Fe/H]	+0.24 dex

Other designations
- BD−14 6448, GJ 894.2, HD 219834, HIP 115126, HR 8866, SAO 165625

Database references
SIMBAD	data

94 Aquarii (abbreviated 94 Aqr) is a triple star system in the equatorial constellation of Aquarius. 94 Aquarii is the Flamsteed designation. The brightest member has an apparent visual magnitude of 5.19, making it visible to the naked eye. The parallax measured by the Gaia spacecraft yields a distance estimate of around 73 light-years (22 parsecs) from Earth.

The inner pair of this triple star system form a spectroscopic binary with an orbital period of 6.321 years, a moderate orbital eccentricity of 0.173, and a combined visual magnitude of 5.19. The primary component of this pair has a stellar classification of G8.5 IV, with the luminosity class of IV indicating this is a subgiant star. At an angular separation of 13.0 arcseconds from this pair is a magnitude 7.52 K-type main sequence star with a classification of K2 V.
