= 101 Aquarii =

Star in the constellation Aquarius

- Location of 101 Aquarii (circled)

Observation data Epoch J2000 Equinox ICRS
- Constellation: Aquarius
- Right ascension: 23^{h} 33^{m} 16.62300^{s}
- Declination: −20° 54′ 52.2155″
- Apparent magnitude (V): 4.71

Characteristics
- Evolutionary stage: main sequence
- Spectral type: A0 V
- U−B color index: +0.00
- B−V color index: +0.02

Astrometry
Radial velocity (R_{v})	+15 km/s
Proper motion (μ)	RA: −3.41 mas/yr Dec.: +8.46 mas/yr
Parallax (π)	11.11±0.67 mas
Distance	290 ± 20 ly (90 ± 5 pc)

Details
Rotational velocity (v sin i)	180 km/s

Other designations
- BD−21 6437, HD 221565, HIP 116247, HR 8939, SAO 191988

Database references
SIMBAD	data

101 Aquarii (abbreviated 101 Aqr) is a star in the equatorial constellation of Aquarius. 101 Aquarii is the Flamsteed designation, although it also bears the Bayer designation b^{3} Aquarii. 101 Aqr is a double star with the designation B 1900. The combined apparent visual magnitude of the pair is 4.71, which is bright enough to be seen with the naked eye from the suburbs. The distance of this star from Earth is estimated as 290 light-years (89 parsecs) based upon parallax measurements.

The brighter member of this system has an apparent magnitude of 4.81. It is an A-type main sequence star with a stellar classification of A0 V. This star is spinning rapidly with a projected rotational velocity of 180 km/s. The fainter companion is a magnitude 7.43 star at an angular separation of 0.840 arcseconds.
