= 66 Aquarii =

Star in the constellation Aquarius

- Location of 66 Aquarii (circled)

Observation data Epoch J2000 Equinox ICRS
- Constellation: Aquarius
- Right ascension: 22^{h} 43^{m} 35.23307^{s}
- Declination: −18° 49′ 49.3557″
- Apparent magnitude (V): 4.673

Characteristics
- Spectral type: K3 III
- U−B color index: +1.549
- B−V color index: +1.376
- Variable type: suspected

Astrometry
| Radial velocity (R_{v}) | +21.6 km/s |
| Proper motion (μ) | RA: −31.73 mas/yr Dec.: −28.54 mas/yr |
| Parallax (π) | 7.53±0.26 mas |
| Distance | 430 ± 10 ly (133 ± 5 pc) |
| Absolute magnitude (M_{V}) | −0.93 |

Details
| Radius | 37 R_{☉} |
| Luminosity | 434.08 L_{☉} |
| Surface gravity (log g) | 2.06 cgs |
| Temperature | 4,170 K |
| Metallicity [Fe/H] | −0.23 dex |
| Rotational velocity (v sin i) | 10 km/s |

Other designations
- 66 Aqr, BD−19°6324, HD 215167, HIP 112211, HR 8649, SAO 165252

Database references
| SIMBAD | data |

66 Aquarii is a single star in the equatorial constellation of Aquarius. 66 Aquarii is the Flamsteed designation though the star also bears the Bayer designation of g^{1} Aquarii. It is visible to the naked eye as a faint, orange-hued star with an apparent visual magnitude of 4.673. Based upon an annual parallax shift of 7.53 milliarcseconds, the distance to this star is about 430 light-years (130 parsecs).

This is an evolved giant star with a stellar classification of K3 III. It has expanded to 37 times the radius of the Sun and is radiating 434 times the luminosity of the Sun from its outer envelope at an effective temperature of 4,170 K. This gives it the orange-hued glow of a K-type star. It is a suspected variable star that ranges in magnitude between 4.66 and 4.71.
