= 89 Aquarii =

Binary star in the constellation Aquarius

- Location of 89 Aquarii (circled in red)

Observation data Epoch J2000 Equinox ICRS
- Constellation: Aquarius
- Right ascension: 23^{h} 09^{m} 54.89736^{s}
- Declination: −22° 27′ 27.4192″
- Apparent magnitude (V): +4.69

Characteristics
- Spectral type: G3 II + A2 V
- U−B color index: +0.39
- B−V color index: +0.65

Astrometry
Radial velocity (R_{v})	−4.8 km/s
Proper motion (μ)	RA: +32.61 mas/yr Dec.: −9.76 mas/yr
Parallax (π)	6.47±0.68 mas
Distance	approx. 500 ly (approx. 150 pc)
Absolute magnitude (M_{V})	0.1/1.5

Details

89 Aqr A
Mass	2.9 M_{☉}
Surface gravity (log g)	3.62 cgs
Temperature	5,640 K
Metallicity [Fe/H]	+0.27 dex
Age	320 Myr

89 Aqr B
Mass	2.0 M_{☉}
Temperature	8,912 K

Other designations
- CD−23 17771, HIP 114375, HR 8817, SAO 191687.
- 89 Aqr A: HD 218640.
- 89 Aqr B: HD 218641.

Database references
SIMBAD	data

89 Aquarii (abbreviated 89 Aqr) is a binary star system in the equatorial constellation of Aquarius. 89 Aquarii is the Flamsteed designation, though it also bears the Bayer designation c^{3} Aquarii. The apparent visual magnitude of +4.69 is bright enough to be seen with the naked eye. Its distance from Earth is roughly 500 light-years (150 pc), based upon parallax measurements with an 11% margin of error.

The primary component of this system has a magnitude of 5.27 and a stellar classification of G3 II, which suggests this is an evolved star in the bright giant stage. The companion is an A-type main sequence star with a stellar classification of A2 V. As of 2010, it is located at an angular separation of 0.1843 arcseconds along a position angle of 135.1°. They orbit each other with an estimated period of 201 years and a semimajor axis of 0.45 arcseconds.
