= 86 Aquarii =

Binary star in the constellation Aquarius

- Location of 86 Aquarii (circled in red)

Observation data Epoch J2000 Equinox ICRS
- Constellation: Aquarius
- Right ascension: 23^{h} 06^{m} 40.84483^{s}
- Declination: −23° 44′ 35.2344″
- Apparent magnitude (V): +4.47

Characteristics
- Spectral type: G8 III
- U−B color index: +0.58
- B−V color index: +0.90

Astrometry
Radial velocity (R_{v})	+15.2 km/s
Proper motion (μ)	RA: +58.86 mas/yr Dec.: −1.74 mas/yr
Parallax (π)	15.08±0.72 mas
Distance	220 ± 10 ly (66 ± 3 pc)

Details
Surface gravity (log g)	3.10 cgs
Temperature	4,900 K
Metallicity [Fe/H]	–0.14 dex

Other designations
- CD−24 17497, HD 218240, HIP 114119, HR 8789, SAO 191651.

Database references
SIMBAD	data

86 Aquarii (abbreviated 86 Aqr) is a binary star system in the equatorial constellation of Aquarius. 86 Aquarii is the Flamsteed designation, though it also bears the Bayer designation c^{1} Aquarii. It is faint but visible to the naked eye with an apparent visual magnitude of +4.47. Based upon parallax measurements, the distance to this star is about 220 light-years (67 parsecs).

The two components of this system have an angular separation of 0.25 arcseconds. The brighter component is a giant star with a spectral classification of G8 III and an apparent magnitude of 4.79. The effective temperature of its outer atmosphere is 4,900 K, giving it the yellowish glow of a G-type star. The fainter component is a star of magnitude 6.77.
