= 99 Aquarii =

Orange-hued giant star in the constellation Aquarius

- Location of 99 Aquarii (circled in red)

Observation data Epoch J2000 Equinox ICRS
- Constellation: Aquarius
- Right ascension: 23^{h} 26^{m} 02.7857^{s}
- Declination: −20° 38′ 31.251″
- Apparent magnitude (V): 4.37

Characteristics
- Spectral type: K4 III
- U−B color index: +1.815
- B−V color index: +1.431
- Variable type: Suspected

Astrometry
Radial velocity (R_{v})	+15.7 km/s
Proper motion (μ)	RA: −50.72 mas/yr Dec.: −64.22 mas/yr
Parallax (π)	11.51±0.21 mas
Distance	283 ± 5 ly (87 ± 2 pc)

Details
Radius	33 R_{☉}
Surface gravity (log g)	1.66 cgs
Temperature	3980 K
Metallicity [Fe/H]	−0.20 dex

Other designations
- BD−21 6420, HD 220704, HIP 115669, HR 8906, NSV 14554, SAO 191900.

Database references
SIMBAD	data

99 Aquarii (abbreviated 99 Aqr) is a star in the equatorial constellation of Aquarius. 99 Aquarii is the Flamsteed designation, although it also bears the Bayer designation b^{2} Aquarii. It is visible to the naked eye with an apparent visual magnitude of 4.38; according to the Bortle Dark-Sky Scale this is bright enough to be seen even from city skies under ideal viewing conditions. Based upon parallax measurements, the distance to this star is around 283 light-years (87 parsecs).

This is a giant star with a stellar classification of K4 III. It is a suspected variable star that apparently ranges in magnitude between 4.35 and 4.45. The measured angular diameter of this star is 3.55 ± 0.21 mas. At the estimated distance of Delta Ophiuchi, this yields a physical size of about 33 times the radius of the Sun. The outer atmosphere has an effective temperature of 3980 K, giving it the orange-hued glow of a cool, K-type star.

This star was a candidate member of the Ursa Major Moving Group based on the work of American astronomer Nancy Roman, but this membership is now in question.
