= 88 Aquarii =

Star in the constellation Aquarius

- Location of 88 Aquarii (circled)

Observation data Epoch J2000.0 Equinox ICRS
- Constellation: Aquarius
- Right ascension: 23^{h} 09^{m} 26.79681^{s}
- Declination: −21° 10′ 20.6812″
- Apparent magnitude (V): +3.679

Characteristics
- Spectral type: K1 III
- U−B color index: +1.239
- B−V color index: +1.215

Astrometry
Radial velocity (R_{v})	+21.1 km/s
Proper motion (μ)	RA: +55.40 mas/yr Dec.: +30.49 mas/yr
Parallax (π)	12.05±0.22 mas
Distance	271 ± 5 ly (83 ± 2 pc)

Details
Radius	29 R_{☉}
Surface gravity (log g)	2.34 cgs
Temperature	4,430 K
Metallicity [Fe/H]	−0.24 dex

Other designations
- Safina, 88 Aqr, BD−21°6368, FK5 873, HD 218594, HIP 114341, HR 8812, SAO 191683

Database references
SIMBAD	data

88 Aquarii (abbreviated 88 Aqr), officially named Safina /sɑːfiːnɑː/, is a star in the equatorial constellation of Aquarius. 88 Aquarii is the Flamsteed designation, though it also bears the Bayer designation c^{2} Aquarii. In dark conditions it is visible to the naked eye with an apparent visual magnitude of +3.68. Based upon parallax measurements, this star is at a distance of around 271 light-years (83 parsecs) from Earth.

The spectrum of 88 Aquarii matches an evolved giant star with a classification of K1 III. Its measured angular diameter is 3.24 ± 0.20 mas, which, at the estimated distance, yields a physical size of about 29 times the radius of the Sun. The cool, orange hued glow of this star comes from the outer atmosphere's effective temperature of 4,430 K.

This star was a member of the Indigenous Arabic constellation Safina, the Ship, between Diphda and Fomalhaut. The IAU Working Group on Star Names approved the name Safina for this star on 12 December 2024 and it is now so entered in the IAU Catalog of Star Names.
