= 68 Aquarii =

Single, G-type star in the constellation Aquarius

Observation data Epoch J2000.0 Equinox ICRS
- Constellation: Aquarius
- Right ascension: 22^{h} 47^{m} 33.12362^{s}
- Declination: −19° 36′ 48.1619″
- Apparent magnitude (V): 5.24

Characteristics
- Evolutionary stage: red clump
- Spectral type: G8III
- B−V color index: +0.941±0.002

Astrometry
Radial velocity (R_{v})	+24.54±0.27 km/s
Proper motion (μ)	RA: −103.390 mas/yr Dec.: −205.545 mas/yr
Parallax (π)	12.0902±0.1605 mas
Distance	270 ± 4 ly (83 ± 1 pc)
Absolute magnitude (M_{V})	0.78

Details
Mass	1.39 M_{☉}
Radius	10.05+0.35 −1.62 R_{☉}
Luminosity	58.5±0.9 L_{☉}
Surface gravity (log g)	2.8 cgs
Temperature	5,036+461 −85 K
Metallicity [Fe/H]	−0.43±0.02 dex
Rotational velocity (v sin i)	0.0 km/s
Age	3.79 Gyr

Other designations
- 68 Aqr, BD−20°6486, HD 215721, HIP 112529, HR 8670, SAO 165293, LTT 9194

Database references
SIMBAD	data

68 Aquarii is a single star located 270 light years away from the Sun in the zodiac constellation of Aquarius. 68 Aquarii is its Flamsteed designation, though it also bears the Bayer designation of g^{2} Aquarii. It is visible to the naked eye as a dim, yellow-hued star with an apparent visual magnitude of 5.24. The object is moving further from the Earth with a heliocentric radial velocity of +24.5 km/s.

This star is 3.79 billion years old with a stellar classification of G8 III, indicating the star is a giant star that has exhausted the hydrogen at its core and expanded off the main sequence. It is a red clump giant, which means it is on the horizontal branch and is generating energy through helium fusion at its core. It has 1.39 times the mass of the Sun and 10 times the Sun's radius. The star is radiating 59 times the luminosity of the Sun from its enlarged photosphere at an effective temperature of 5,036 K.
