= 98 Aquarii =

Star in the constellation Aquarius

- Location of 98 Aquarii (circled in red)

Observation data Epoch J2000 Equinox ICRS
- Constellation: Aquarius
- Right ascension: 23^{h} 22^{m} 58.22606^{s}
- Declination: −20° 06′ 02.0963″
- Apparent magnitude (V): +3.97

Characteristics
- Spectral type: K0 III
- U−B color index: +0.948
- B−V color index: +1.089

Astrometry
Radial velocity (R_{v})	−6.5 km/s
Proper motion (μ)	RA: −121.28 mas/yr Dec.: −97.59 mas/yr
Parallax (π)	19.96±0.23 mas
Distance	163 ± 2 ly (50.1 ± 0.6 pc)

Details
Mass	2.1 M_{☉}
Radius	14 R_{☉}
Surface gravity (log g)	2.4 cgs
Temperature	4,630 K
Metallicity [Fe/H]	−0.30 dex

Other designations
- BD−20°6587, FK5 1612, HD 220321, HIP 115438, HR 8892, SAO 191858

Database references
SIMBAD	data

98 Aquarii (abbreviated 98 Aqr) is a star in the equatorial constellation of Aquarius. 98 Aquarii is the Flamsteed designation, although it also bears the Bayer designation b^{1} Aquarii. It is visible to the naked eye with an apparent visual magnitude of +3.97. The distance to this star, 163 light-years (50 parsecs), is known from parallax measurements made with the Hipparcos spacecraft.

With over double the mass of the Sun, this is an evolved giant star that has a stellar classification of K0 III. The measured angular diameter of this star is 2.54 ± 0.13 mas. At the estimated distance of 98 Aquarii, this yields a physical size of about 14 times the radius of the Sun. The expanded outer envelope has an effective temperature of 4,630 K, giving it the orange glow of a K-type star.
