= List of stars in Grus =

This is the list of notable stars in the constellation Grus, sorted by decreasing brightness.

Name	B	Var	HD	HIP	RA	Dec	vis. mag.	abs. mag.	Dist. (ly)	Sp. class	Notes
α Gru	α		209952	109268	22^{h} 08^{m} 13.88^{s}	−46° 57′ 38.2″	1.73	−0.73	101	B7IV	Alnair (Al Nair, Al Na'ir); suspected variable, V_{max} = 1.70^{m}, V_{min} = 1.76^{m}
β Gru	β		214952	112122	22^{h} 42^{m} 39.93^{s}	−46° 53′ 04.4″	2.07	−1.52	170	M5III	Tiaki, semiregular variable, V_{max} = 1.90^{m}, V_{min} = 2.3^{m}, P = 37 d
γ Gru	γ		207971	108085	21^{h} 53^{m} 55.65^{s}	−37° 21′ 53.4″	3.00	−0.97	203	B8III	Al Dhanab
ε Gru	ε		215789	112623	22^{h} 48^{m} 33.20^{s}	−51° 19′ 00.1″	3.49	0.49	130	A3V	suspected variable, V_{max} = 3.47^{m}, V_{min} = 3.53^{m}
ι Gru	ι		218670	114421	23^{h} 10^{m} 21.43^{s}	−45° 14′ 47.9″	3.88	0.11	185	K0III SB	
δ^{1} Gru	δ^{1}		213009	110997	22^{h} 29^{m} 16.15^{s}	−43° 29′ 44.0″	3.97	−0.82	296	G6/G8III	
ζ Gru	ζ		217364	113638	23^{h} 00^{m} 52.87^{s}	−52° 45′ 14.8″	4.11	1.42	112	G8III	
δ^{2} Gru	δ^{2}		213080	111043	22^{h} 29^{m} 45.45^{s}	−43° 44′ 57.2″	4.12	−0.87	325	M4.5IIIa	semiregular variable, V_{max} = 3.99^{m}, V_{min} = 4.2^{m}
θ Gru	θ		218227	114131	23^{h} 06^{m} 52.77^{s}	−43° 31′ 13.2″	4.28	1.23	133	F5me...	
λ Gru	λ		209688	109111	22^{h} 06^{m} 06.90^{s}	−39° 32′ 35.0″	4.47	0.07	247	M0III	
μ^{1} Gru	μ^{1}		211088	109908	22^{h} 15^{m} 36.88^{s}	−41° 20′ 48.3″	4.79	0.26	262	G8III+...	
ρ Gru	ρ		215104	112203	22^{h} 43^{m} 29.97^{s}	−41° 24′ 50.8″	4.84	0.68	222	K0III	
η Gru	η		215369	112374	22^{h} 45^{m} 37.85^{s}	−53° 30′ 00.6″	4.84	−0.57	394	K2IIICNIV	variable star, ΔV = 0.006^{m}, P = 2.76870 d
μ^{2} Gru	μ^{2}		211202	109973	22^{h} 16^{m} 26.57^{s}	−41° 37′ 37.9″	5.11	0.78	240	G8III	variable star, ΔV = 0.004^{m}, P = 0.13316 d
ξ Gru	ξ		204783	106327	21^{h} 32^{m} 05.86^{s}	−41° 10′ 45.6″	5.29	−0.06	383	K0III	
HD 211415			211415	110109	22^{h} 18^{m} 15.18^{s}	−53° 37′ 31.9″	5.36	4.69	44	G1V	
κ Gru	κ		217902	113957	23^{h} 04^{m} 39.57^{s}	−53° 57′ 52.7″	5.37	−0.02	390	K5III	
HD 216149			216149	112832	22^{h} 51^{m} 02.15^{s}	−39° 09′ 24.5″	5.43	−2.22	1105	K3III	
HD 208321			208321	108294	21^{h} 56^{m} 22.79^{s}	−37° 15′ 13.1″	5.45	0.52	315	A3V	
ν Gru	ν		212953	110936	22^{h} 28^{m} 39.18^{s}	−39° 07′ 53.0″	5.47	0.94	262	G8III	
HD 208737			208737	108543	21^{h} 59^{m} 17.88^{s}	−38° 23′ 42.3″	5.50	0.09	393	K1II/III	
HD 215405			215405	112381	22^{h} 45^{m} 40.81^{s}	−46° 32′ 50.3″	5.52	−1.02	664	K3III	
ο Gru	ο		220729	115713	23^{h} 26^{m} 36.54^{s}	−52° 43′ 18.9″	5.53	3.01	104	F4V	
φ Gru	φ		219693	115054	23^{h} 18^{m} 09.79^{s}	−40° 49′ 26.6″	5.54	2.84	113	F5V	
HD 204960			204960	106429	21^{h} 33^{m} 23.53^{s}	−44° 50′ 55.3″	5.57	−0.83	622	K0III	
HD 207129			207129	107649	21^{h} 48^{m} 15.61^{s}	−47° 18′ 10.4″	5.57	4.60	51	G2V	
π^{2} Gru	π^{2}		212132	110506	22^{h} 23^{m} 07.79^{s}	−45° 55′ 42.0″	5.62	2.58	132	F3III-IV	
υ Gru	υ		218242	114132	23^{h} 06^{m} 53.60^{s}	−38° 53′ 32.3″	5.62	0.84	294	A0V	
HD 217403			217403	113657	23^{h} 01^{m} 07.50^{s}	−50° 57′ 00.1″	5.68	−0.16	481	K3III	
τ^{3} Gru	τ^{3}		216823	113307	22^{h} 56^{m} 47.82^{s}	−47° 58′ 09.2″	5.72	1.11	272	Am...	
HD 220440			220440	115537	23^{h} 24^{m} 13.24^{s}	−51° 53′ 27.9″	5.75	−0.39	552	M0III	suspected variable
HD 219263			219263	114775	23^{h} 14^{m} 58.53^{s}	−41° 06′ 18.5″	5.77	1.49	234	K2III	
HD 217842			217842	113902	23^{h} 03^{m} 59.63^{s}	−41° 28′ 44.5″	5.79	0.97	301	K0III	variable star, ΔV = 0.004^{m}, P = 0.27350 d
HD 218269			218269	114167	23^{h} 07^{m} 14.81^{s}	−50° 41′ 11.8″	5.81	2.81	130	F6.5IV-V+..	suspected variable
HD 218630			218630	114382	23^{h} 09^{m} 57.64^{s}	−42° 51′ 40.2″	5.83	3.13	113	F4IV	
σ^{2} Gru	σ^{2}		214150	111643	22^{h} 36^{m} 58.82^{s}	−40° 35′ 27.1″	5.85	1.71	219	A1V	
DL Gru		DL	218655	114407	23^{h} 10^{m} 09.72^{s}	−40° 35′ 29.2″	5.90	−1.05	799	M4III	semiregular variable
HD 219507			219507	114921	23^{h} 16^{m} 39.79^{s}	−44° 29′ 20.9″	5.92	1.19	288	K1III	
HD 214953			214953	112117	22^{h} 42^{m} 36.88^{s}	−47° 12′ 36.0″	5.99	4.13	77	G0	suspected variable, V_{max} = 5.97^{m}, V_{min} = 6.02^{m}
S Gru		S	212539	110736	22^{h} 26^{m} 05.47^{s}	−48° 26′ 18.8″	6.00		1450	M8IIIe	Mira variable, V_{max} = 6^{m}, V_{min} = 15^{m}, P = 401.51 d
τ^{1} Gru	τ^{1}		216435	113044	22^{h} 53^{m} 37.74^{s}	−48° 35′ 53.1″	6.03	3.42	109	G3IV	has a planet
HD 220003			220003	115272	23^{h} 20^{m} 50.13^{s}	−50° 18′ 23.0″	6.04	1.26	294	Fm...	
HD 214987			214987	112127	22^{h} 42^{m} 43.05^{s}	−44° 14′ 53.2″	6.06	1.10	320	K1IV	suspected variable, V_{max} = 6.05^{m}, V_{min} = 6.07^{m}
HD 211053			211053	109902	22^{h} 15^{m} 35.03^{s}	−44° 27′ 05.4″	6.10	−0.16	583	G8/K0III	
HD 220401			220401	115496	23^{h} 23^{m} 45.41^{s}	−43° 07′ 28.0″	6.12	−1.55	1116	K3III	
HD 220392	ψ (Note: Labelled Psi Gruis (ψ Gru/ψ Gruis) by Bode in his Uranographia Ioannis Elerte Bode uranographia)	DQ	220392	115510	23^{h} 23^{m} 54.45^{s}	−53° 48′ 31.2″	6.13	0.29	480	A4III	δ Scuti variable
BZ Gru		BZ	208435	108347	21^{h} 57^{m} 02.14^{s}	−37° 44′ 48.7″	6.18	0.53	440	F2/F3V	δ Scuti variable, V_{max} = 6.13^{m}, V_{min} = 6.21^{m}
HD 210918			210918	109821	22^{h} 14^{m} 38.21^{s}	−41° 22′ 47.1″	6.23	4.51	72	G5V	
HD 206642			206642	107344	21^{h} 44^{m} 29.41^{s}	−38° 33′ 07.7″	6.28	−0.62	782	K1IIICN...	
σ^{1} Gru	σ^{1}		214085	111594	22^{h} 36^{m} 29.27^{s}	−40° 34′ 57.0″	6.28	2.07	226	A3Vn	
HD 205096			205096	106500	21^{h} 34^{m} 17.18^{s}	−42° 55′ 28.8″	6.32	1.34	323	K1IIICN...	
HD 218255			218255	114159	23^{h} 07^{m} 09.43^{s}	−49° 36′ 22.1″	6.33	−1.68	1304	K4III	
HD 216666			216666	113189	22^{h} 55^{m} 14.87^{s}	−36° 23′ 18.9″	6.40	−0.33	723	K2III	
π^{1} Gru	π^{1}		212087	110478	22^{h} 22^{m} 44.18^{s}	−45° 56′ 52.5″	6.42	0.50	498	S5,7:	semiregular variable, V_{max} = 5.31^{m}, V_{min} = 7.01^{m}, P = 195.5 d
HD 210204			210204	109408	22^{h} 09^{m} 57.82^{s}	−48° 06′ 27.0″	6.43	−0.19	686	K3III	
HD 217642			217642	113784	23^{h} 02^{m} 34.07^{s}	−36° 25′ 14.9″	6.46	0.93	415	K1III	
HD 215504			215504	112432	22^{h} 46^{m} 28.22^{s}	−49° 41′ 06.4″	6.49	−0.35	760	K0III-IV	
HD 219531			219531	114937	23^{h} 16^{m} 49.85^{s}	−41° 11′ 40.0″	6.49	0.61	489	K0III	
HD 215456			215456	112414	22^{h} 46^{m} 08^{s}	−48° 58′ 4″	6.63		124	G0.5V	has two planets (b & c)
τ^{2} Gru	τ^{2}		216656	113190	22^{h} 55^{m} 16.19^{s}	−48° 29′ 30.8″	6.67	3.33	152	F7V:	component of the τ^{2} Gru system
τ^{2} Gru	τ^{2}		216655	113191	22^{h} 55^{m} 16.35^{s}	−48° 27′ 57.4″	7.04	3.71	151	G5	component of the τ^{2} Gru system
HD 213240			213240	111143	22^{h} 31^{m} 00.37^{s}	−49° 25′ 59.8″	6.80	3.75	133	G0/G1V	has a planet (b)
HD 208487			208487	108375	21^{h} 57^{m} 19.85^{s}	−37° 45′ 49.0″	7.48	4.26	143	G2V:	Itonda, has two planets (b & c)
HD 217522		BP	217522	113711	23^{h} 01^{m} 46.82^{s}	−44° 50′ 26.9″	8.26		287.0	Ap...	rapidly oscillating Ap star
RS Gru		RS	206379	107231	21^{h} 43^{m} 04.22^{s}	−48° 11′ 22.2″	8.26		776	A9IV	δ Sct variable, V_{max} = 7.94^{m}, V_{min} = 8.48^{m}, P = 0.1470117 d
Gliese 832			204961	106440	21^{h} 33^{m} 33.98^{s}	−49° 00′ 32.4″	8.67	10.20	16.1	M1.5V	has a planet (b)
W Gru		W	214791	112009	22^{h} 41^{m} 18.67^{s}	−43° 50′ 28.6″	8.96		1140	F5V	AR Lac variable
WASP-95					22^{h} 29^{m} 50.0^{s}	−48° 00′ 11″	10.1			G2	has a transiting planet (b)
BC Gru		BC			22^{h} 44^{m} 49.11^{s}	−48° 10′ 13.0″	10.60				W UMa variable, V_{max} = 10.60^{m}, V_{min} = 10.94^{m}, P = 0.30735686 d
U Gru		U			21^{h} 31^{m} 48.77^{s}	−45° 02′ 42.5″	11.38			A5	Algol variable
RZ Gru		RZ			22^{h} 47^{m} 12.01^{s}	−42° 44′ 38.72″	12.04			B6	nova-like star
CE Gru		CE			21^{h} 37^{m} 56.38^{s}	−43° 42′ 13.1″	17.4				AM Her variable, V_{max} = 17.4^{m}, V_{min} = 19.5^{m}, P = 0.0754 d
PSR J2144-3933					21^{h} 44^{m} 12.0^{s}	−39° 33′ 55.2″					pulsar
Table legend: • Name = Proper name • B = Bayer designation • F or/and G. = Flamsteed designation or Gould designation • Var = Variable star designation • HD = Henry Draper Catalogue designation number • HIP = Hipparcos Catalogue designation number • RA = Right ascension for the Epoch/Equinox J2000.0 • Dec = Declination for the Epoch/Equinox J2000.0 • vis. mag. = visual magnitude (m or m_{v}), also known as apparent magnitude • abs. mag. = absolute magnitude (M_{v}) • Dist. (ly) = Distance in light-years from Earth • Sp. class = Spectral class of the star in the stellar classification system • Notes = Common name(s) or alternate name(s); comments; notable properties [for example: multiple star status, range of variability if it is a variable star, exoplanets, etc.]

== See also ==
- List of stars by constellation
