= Grus in Chinese astronomy =

The modern constellation Grus lies across one of the quadrants symbolized by the Black Tortoise of the North (北方玄武, Běi Fāng Xuán Wǔ), and The Southern Asterisms (近南極星區, Jìnnánjíxīngōu), that divide the sky in traditional Chinese uranography.

Constellation Grus in Chinese sky is not fully seen. Alnair (Alpha Gruis) and Tiaki (Beta Gruis) are bright stars in this constellation that were possibly never seen in the Chinese sky.

The name of the western constellation in modern Chinese is 天鶴座 (tiān hè zuò), meaning "the heaven crane constellation".

== Stars ==
The map of Chinese constellation in constellation Grus area consists of :

Four Symbols	Mansion (Chinese name)	Romanization	Translation	Asterisms (Chinese name)	Romanization	Translation	Western star name	Proper Name	Chinese star name	Romanization	Translation
Black Tortoise of the North (北方玄武)	虛	Xū	Emptiness	敗臼	Bàijiù	Decayed Mortar					
Black Tortoise of the North (北方玄武)	虛	Xū	Emptiness	敗臼	Bàijiù	Decayed Mortar	γ Gru	Aldhanab	敗臼一	Bàijiùyī	1st star
Black Tortoise of the North (北方玄武)	虛	Xū	Emptiness	敗臼	Bàijiù	Decayed Mortar	λ Gru		敗臼二	Bàijiùèr	2nd star
-	近南極星區 (non-mansions)	Jìnnánjíxīngōu (non-mansions)	The Southern Asterisms (non-mansions)	鶴	Hè	Crane					
-	近南極星區 (non-mansions)	Jìnnánjíxīngōu (non-mansions)	The Southern Asterisms (non-mansions)	鶴	Hè	Crane	α Gru	Alnair	鶴一	Hèyī	1st star
-	近南極星區 (non-mansions)	Jìnnánjíxīngōu (non-mansions)	The Southern Asterisms (non-mansions)	鶴	Hè	Crane	β Gru	Tiaki	鶴二	Hèèr	2nd star
-	近南極星區 (non-mansions)	Jìnnánjíxīngōu (non-mansions)	The Southern Asterisms (non-mansions)	鶴	Hè	Crane	ε Gru		鶴三	Hèsān	3rd star
-	近南極星區 (non-mansions)	Jìnnánjíxīngōu (non-mansions)	The Southern Asterisms (non-mansions)	鶴	Hè	Crane	η Gru		鶴四	Hèsì	4th star
-	近南極星區 (non-mansions)	Jìnnánjíxīngōu (non-mansions)	The Southern Asterisms (non-mansions)	鶴	Hè	Crane	ζ Gru		鶴六	Hèliù	6th star
-	近南極星區 (non-mansions)	Jìnnánjíxīngōu (non-mansions)	The Southern Asterisms (non-mansions)	鶴	Hè	Crane	ι Gru		鶴七	Hèqī	7th star
-	近南極星區 (non-mansions)	Jìnnánjíxīngōu (non-mansions)	The Southern Asterisms (non-mansions)	鶴	Hè	Crane	θ Gru		鶴八	Hèbā	8th star
-	近南極星區 (non-mansions)	Jìnnánjíxīngōu (non-mansions)	The Southern Asterisms (non-mansions)	鶴	Hè	Crane	ρ Gru		鶴九	Hèjiǔ	9th star
-	近南極星區 (non-mansions)	Jìnnánjíxīngōu (non-mansions)	The Southern Asterisms (non-mansions)	鶴	Hè	Crane	ν Gru		鶴十	Hèshí	10th star
-	近南極星區 (non-mansions)	Jìnnánjíxīngōu (non-mansions)	The Southern Asterisms (non-mansions)	鶴	Hè	Crane	δ^{2} Gru		鶴十一	Hèshíyī	11th star
-	近南極星區 (non-mansions)	Jìnnánjíxīngōu (non-mansions)	The Southern Asterisms (non-mansions)	鶴	Hè	Crane	μ^{1} Gru		鶴十二	Hèshíèr	12th star
-	近南極星區 (non-mansions)	Jìnnánjíxīngōu (non-mansions)	The Southern Asterisms (non-mansions)	鶴	Hè	Crane	μ^{2} Gru		鶴增一	Hèzēngyī	1st additional star
-	近南極星區 (non-mansions)	Jìnnánjíxīngōu (non-mansions)	The Southern Asterisms (non-mansions)	鶴	Hè	Crane	δ^{1} Gru		鶴增二	Hèzēngèr	2nd additional star

== See also ==
- Traditional Chinese star names
- Chinese constellations
- List of brightest stars
