= Beta Gruis =

Star in the constellation of Grus

- Location of β Gruis (circled)

Observation data Epoch J2000 Equinox ICRS
- Constellation: Grus
- Right ascension: 22^{h} 42^{m} 40.05027^{s}
- Declination: −46° 53′ 04.4752″
- Apparent magnitude (V): 2.0 - 2.3

Characteristics
- Evolutionary stage: AGB
- Spectral type: M4.5 III
- U−B color index: +1.757
- B−V color index: +1.620
- Variable type: SRb

Astrometry
Radial velocity (R_{v})	+1.6 km/s
Proper motion (μ)	RA: +135.16 mas/yr Dec.: −4.38 mas/yr
Parallax (π)	18.43±0.42 mas
Distance	177 ± 4 ly (54 ± 1 pc)
Absolute magnitude (M_{V})	−1.61±0.052

Details
Mass	2.4 M_{☉}
Radius	154 R_{☉}
Luminosity	3,221±242 L_{☉}
Surface gravity (log g)	0.4 cgs
Temperature	3,508±125 K
Metallicity [Fe/H]	0.0 dex
Age	450 Myr

Other designations
- Tiaki, Beta Gru, CD−47 14308, FK5 856, HR 8636, HD 214952, HIP 112122, SAO 231258.

Database references
SIMBAD	data

Beta Gruis (β Gruis, abbreviated Beta Gru, β Gru), formally named Tiaki /tiˈɑːki/, is the second brightest star in the southern constellation of Grus. It was once considered the rear star in the tail of the constellation of the (Southern) Fish, Piscis Austrinus: it, with Alpha, Delta, Theta, Iota, and Lambda Gruis, belonged to Piscis Austrinus in medieval Arabic astronomy.

== Nomenclature ==
β Gruis (Latinised to Beta Gruis) is the star's Bayer designation.

It bore the traditional Tuamotuan name of Tiaki. In 2016, the IAU organized a Working Group on Star Names (WGSN) to catalog and standardize proper names for stars. The WGSN approved the name Tiaki for this star on 5 September 2017 and it is now so included in the List of IAU-approved Star Names.

In Chinese, 鶴 (Hè), meaning Crane, refers to an asterism consisting of Beta Gruis, Alpha Gruis, Epsilon Gruis, Eta Gruis, Delta Tucanae, Zeta Gruis, Iota Gruis, Theta Gruis, Delta² Gruis and Mu¹ Gruis. Consequently, Beta Gruis itself is known as 鶴二 (Hè èr, English: Second Star of the Crane). The Chinese name gave rise to another English name, Ke.

== Properties ==
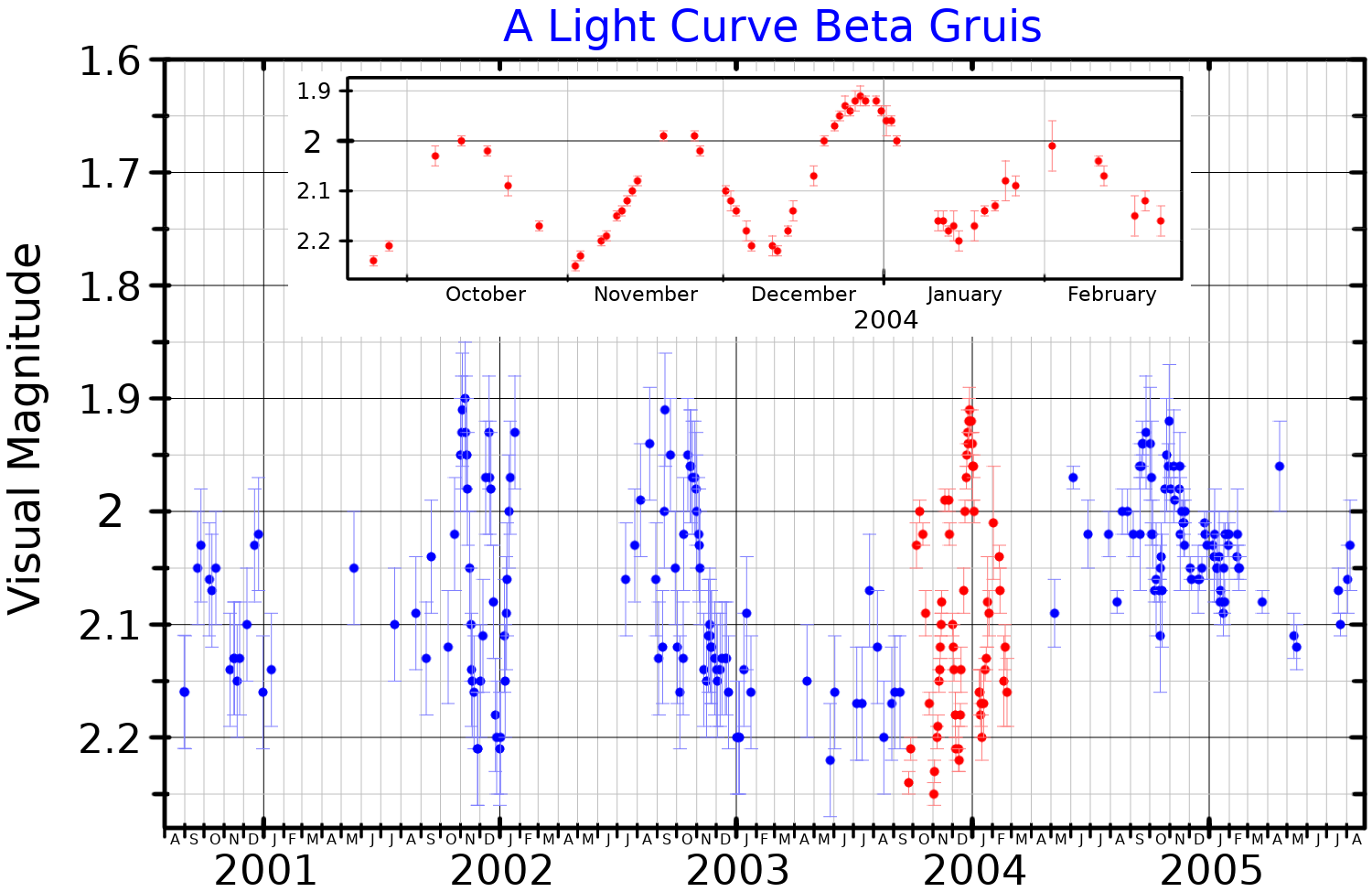
A visual band light curve for Beta Gruis, plotted from data published by Otero and Moon (2006). The inset plot shows the points plotted in red with an expanded scale.

Beta Gruis is a red giant star on the asymptotic giant branch with an estimated mass of about 2.4 times that of the Sun and a surface temperature of approximately 3,500 K, just over half the surface temperature of the Sun. This low temperature accounts for the dull red color of an M-type star. The total luminosity is about 3,200 times that of the Sun, and it has 150 times the Sun's radius.

It is one of the brightest stars at infrared and near-infrared wavelengths. At the K band, it is the fifth-brightest star in the night sky.

Alan William James Cousins announced that Beta Gruis is a variable star in 1952. Beta Gruis is a semiregular variable (SRb) star that varies in magnitude by about 0.4. It varies between intervals when it displays regular changes with a 37-day periodicity and times when it undergoes slow irregular variability.
