= List of star names in Grus =

This is the list of the proper names for the stars in the constellation Grus. (Used modern western astronomy and uranography only).

== List ==
star	proper name	derivation
α Gru	Alnair	Arabic
β Gru	Tiaki	Tuamotuan
γ Gru	Aldhanab	Arabic

== Etymologies ==
=== α Gru ===
- Alnair, Al Nair (Al Na'ir):

＜ (ar) an-nayyir, "the bright one" ＜ (scientific Arabic) al-Nayyir min Dhanab al-ḥūt (al-Janūbiyy), "the Bright (star) belongs to the Tail of (the constellation of) the (Southern) Fish", for this star.

=== γ Gru ===
- Aldhanab:::

＜ (ar) al-dhanab, "the tail" ＜ (scientific Arabic) al-dhanab al-ḥūt (al-Janūbiyy), "the tail of (the constellation of) the (Southern) Fish", for this star.

=== θ Gru ===
- No Arabic Name Available

＜ A fairly large and bright star located west of the constellation Grus. Follows the same paths as many of the other stars in Grus, for example Gamma and Alpha Gruis in history and mythology

== See also ==
- List of stars in Grus
- List of star names
