= Mu Gruis =

μ Gruis, Latinised as, Mu Gruis refers to 2 distinct star systems in the constellation Grus:

- μ^{1} Gruis
- μ^{2} Gruis
