= Sigma Gruis =

The Bayer designation σ Gruis (Sigma Gruis) refers to 2 distinct star systems in the constellation Grus:

- σ^{1} Gruis
- σ^{2} Gruis
