= Pi Gruis =

π Gruis, Latinised as Pi Gruis, is an optical double comprising two unrelated stars in the constellation Grus appearing close by line of sight:

- π^{1} Gruis (HR 8521), a semiregular S-type star
- π^{2} Gruis (HR 8524), an F-type star
