= IC 5148 =

Planetary nebula in the constellation of Grus

Emission nebula
- Planetary nebula
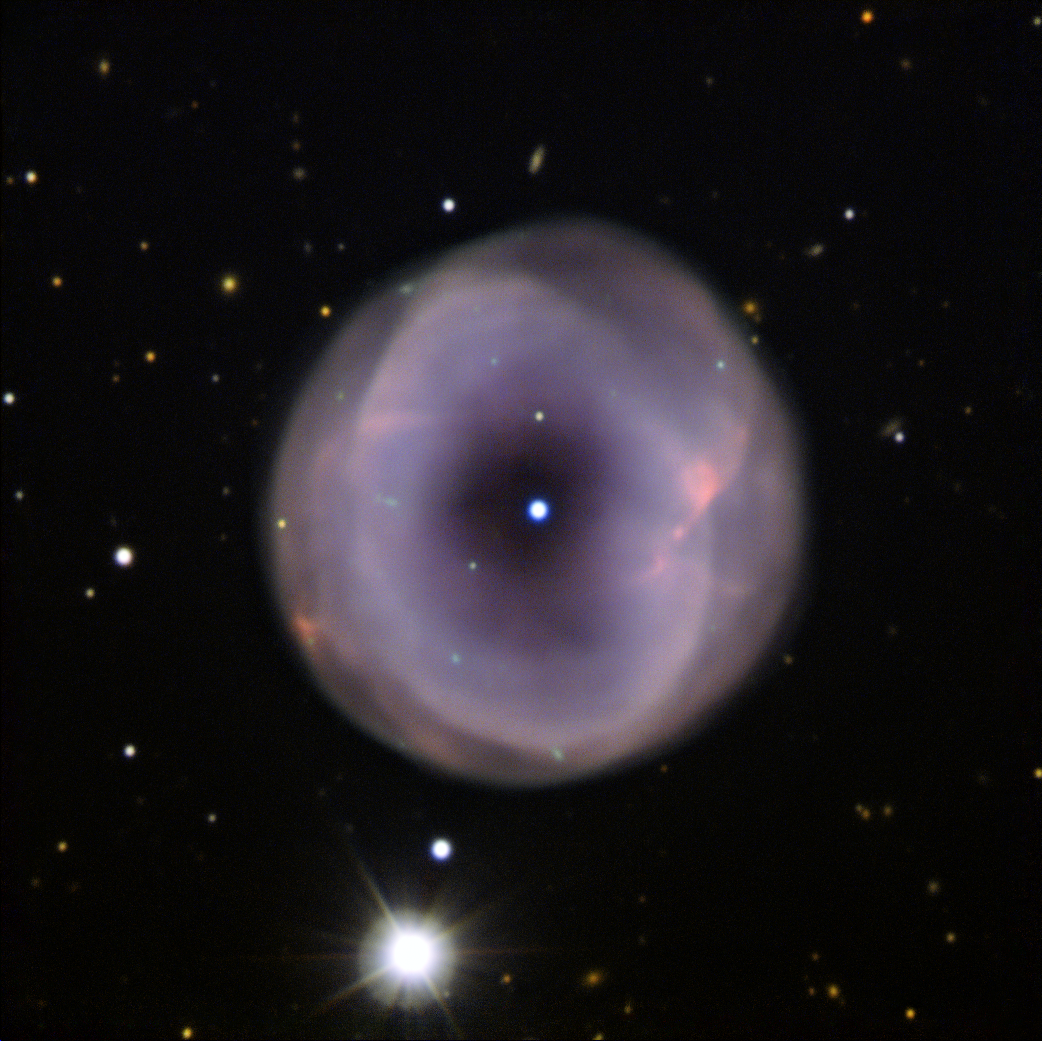
- IC 5148, nicknamed the Spare Tyre Nebula, taken by the ESO Faint Object Spectrograph and Camera (EFOSC2) on the New Technology Telescope.

Observation data: J2000 epoch
- Right ascension: 21^{h} 59^{m} 35.2^{s}
- Declination: −39° 23′ 08″
- Distance: 3000 light years ly
- Apparent magnitude (V): 16.5
- Apparent dimensions (V): 2 ′ x 2 ′
- Constellation: Grus
- Designations: IC 5150, PK 002-52 1, PSCz P21565-3937, ESO 344-5, IRAS 21565-3937, PN G002.7-52.4

Nicknamed the Spare Tyre Nebula or Ghost Ring Nebula, IC 5148 is a planetary nebula located around 1 degree west of Lambda Gruis in the constellation of Grus (The Crane). It was discovered by Australian amateur astronomer Walter Gale in 1894. Around 3000 light-years distant, it is expanding at a rate of 50 kilometres a second, one of the fastest of all planetary nebulae.

The central star of the planetary nebula has a spectral type of hgO(H).
