= Upsilon Gruis =

Binary star in the constellation Grus

υ Gruis
Observation data Epoch J2000 Equinox J2000
- Constellation: Grus
- Right ascension: 23^{h} 06^{m} 53.62612^{s}
- Declination: −38° 53′ 32.2465″
- Apparent magnitude (V): 5.614

Characteristics
- Evolutionary stage: main sequence
- Spectral type: A1V
- B−V color index: +0.01

Astrometry
| Radial velocity (R_{v}) | +16 km/s |
| Proper motion (μ) | RA: +33.436 mas/yr Dec.: +6.182 mas/yr |
| Parallax (π) | 11.2249±0.0982 mas |
| Distance | 291 ± 3 ly (89.1 ± 0.8 pc) |
| Absolute magnitude (M_{V}) | +0.92 |

Details
| Radius | 2.2 R_{☉} |
| Luminosity | 42 L_{☉} |
| Temperature | 10,141 ± 290 K |
| Rotational velocity (v sin i) | 320 km/s |

Other designations
- υ Gru, CD−39°14936, HD 218242, HIP 114132, HR 8790, SAO 214313

Database references
| SIMBAD | data |

υ Gruis, Latinised as Upsilon Gruis, is a double star in the southern constellation of Grus. The apparent magnitude is 5.61, which is bright enough to be viewed with the naked eye. Located around 89 parsecs (290 ly) distant, the white-hued primary is an A-type main-sequence star of spectral type A1V, a star that is currently fusing its core hydrogen. it is spinning rapidly with a projected rotational velocity of 320 km/s. The companion is a magnitude 8.24 star at an angular separation of 0.90″ from the primary along a position angle of 205°, as of 2009.
