= Phi Gruis =

Star in the constellation Grus

Observation data Epoch J2000.0 Equinox J2000.0 (ICRS)
- Constellation: Grus
- Right ascension: 23^{h} 18^{m} 09.88466^{s}
- Declination: −40° 49′ 27.7034″
- Apparent magnitude (V): 5.49

Characteristics
- Evolutionary stage: main sequence
- Spectral type: F4 V
- U−B color index: −0.05
- B−V color index: +0.47

Astrometry
Radial velocity (R_{v})	+15.15±0.29 km/s
Proper motion (μ)	RA: +126.920 mas/yr Dec.: −122.577 mas/yr
Parallax (π)	29.3153±0.1115 mas
Distance	111.3 ± 0.4 ly (34.1 ± 0.1 pc)
Absolute magnitude (M_{V})	2.82

Details
Mass	1.45+0.02 −0.01 M_{☉}
Radius	1.87+0.07 −0.04 R_{☉}
Luminosity	5.84±0.03 L_{☉}
Surface gravity (log g)	4.06±0.02 cgs
Temperature	6,606±63 K
Metallicity [Fe/H]	0.00±0.05 dex
Rotational velocity (v sin i)	19.9±1.0 km/s
Age	2.12+0.22 −0.16 Gyr

Other designations
- φ Gru, CD−41°15211, GJ 4330, HD 219693, HIP 115054, HR 8859, SAO 231539

Database references
SIMBAD	data

Phi Gruis, Latinised from φ Gruis, is a solitary, yellow-white hued star in the southern constellation of Grus, near the eastern constellation border with Phoenix. It is faintly visible to the naked eye with an apparent visual magnitude of +5.49. Based upon an annual parallax shift of 29.3 mas as seen from the Earth, it lies at a distance of 111 light years from the Sun. The star is drifting further away with a radial velocity of +15 km/s.

This object is an F-type main-sequence star with a stellar classification of F4 V, where the luminosity class of 'V' indicates it is currently generating energy through hydrogen fusion at its core. It is 2.12 billion years old and is spinning with a projected rotational velocity of 20 km/s. The star has 1.45 times the mass of the Sun and 1.87 times the Sun's radius. It is radiating 5.8 times as much luminosity as the Sun from its photosphere at an effective temperature of 6,606 km/s.
