= Xi Gruis =

Star in the constellation Grus

Observation data Epoch J2000.0 Equinox J2000.0 (ICRS)
- Constellation: Grus
- Right ascension: 21^{h} 32^{m} 05.87583^{s}
- Declination: −41° 10′ 45.5242″
- Apparent magnitude (V): 5.29

Characteristics
- Spectral type: K0 III
- B−V color index: +1.10

Astrometry
Radial velocity (R_{v})	−9.81±0.13 km/s
Proper motion (μ)	RA: +19.427 mas/yr Dec.: +11.278 mas/yr
Parallax (π)	7.5904±0.1226 mas
Distance	430 ± 7 ly (132 ± 2 pc)
Absolute magnitude (M_{V})	−0.47

Details
Radius	19.2±0.6 R_{☉}
Luminosity	161.7±3.1 L_{☉}
Temperature	4,703+76 −74 K

Other designations
- ξ Gru, CD−41°14550, FK5 3719, HD 204783, HIP 106327, HR 8229, SAO 230726

Database references
SIMBAD	data

ξ Gruis, Latinised as Xi Gruis, is a solitary star in the southern constellation of Grus, near the constellation border with Microscopium. It is visible to the naked eye as a dim, orange-hued star with an apparent visual magnitude of 5.3. The star is located about 430 light-years distant from the Sun, based on parallax, but is drifting closer with a radial velocity of −10 km/s.

This is an evolved giant star with a stellar classification of K0 III, having exhausted the supply of hydrogen at its core then cooled and expanded. It now has 19 times the girth of the Sun and is radiating 12 times the Sun's luminosity from its enlarged photosphere at an effective temperature of 4,703 K.
