= Tau3 Gruis =

Star in the constellation Grus

Tau^{3} Gruis
- Location of τ^{3} Gruis (circled in red)

Observation data Epoch J2000.0 Equinox J2000.0 (ICRS)
- Constellation: Grus
- Right ascension: 22^{h} 56^{m} 47.76032^{s}
- Declination: −47° 58′ 09.1542″
- Apparent magnitude (V): 5.71

Characteristics
- Evolutionary stage: main sequence
- Spectral type: kA5hA7mF2
- U−B color index: +0.17
- B−V color index: +0.22

Astrometry
Radial velocity (R_{v})	6.3±0.6 km/s
Proper motion (μ)	RA: −25.096 mas/yr Dec.: +2.455 mas/yr
Parallax (π)	12.7125±0.0409 mas
Distance	256.6 ± 0.8 ly (78.7 ± 0.3 pc)
Absolute magnitude (M_{V})	+1.36

Details
Radius	2.88+0.13 −0.18 R_{☉}
Luminosity	26.8+0.3 −0.3 L_{☉}
Temperature	7,735+406 −158 K

Other designations
- τ Gru, CD−48°14364, FK5 3832, HD 216823, HIP 113307, HR 8722, SAO 231364

Database references
SIMBAD	data

Tau^{3} Gruis is a solitary star in the southern constellation of Grus. Its apparent magnitude is 5.71, which is bright enough to be visible to the naked eye as a dim, white-hued star. The star is located around 257 light-years (79 pc) distant from the Sun based on parallax, and it is drifting further away with a radial velocity of 6 km/s.

This is an Am star with a stellar classification of kA5hA7mF2. This notation indicates the spectrum displays the calcium K-line of an A5 star, the hydrogen lines of an A7 star, and the metal lines of an F2 star. It has 2.9 times the Sun's radius and is radiating 27 times the luminosity of the Sun from its photosphere at an effective temperature of around 7,735 K.
