= NGC 7424 =

Galaxy in the constellation Grus

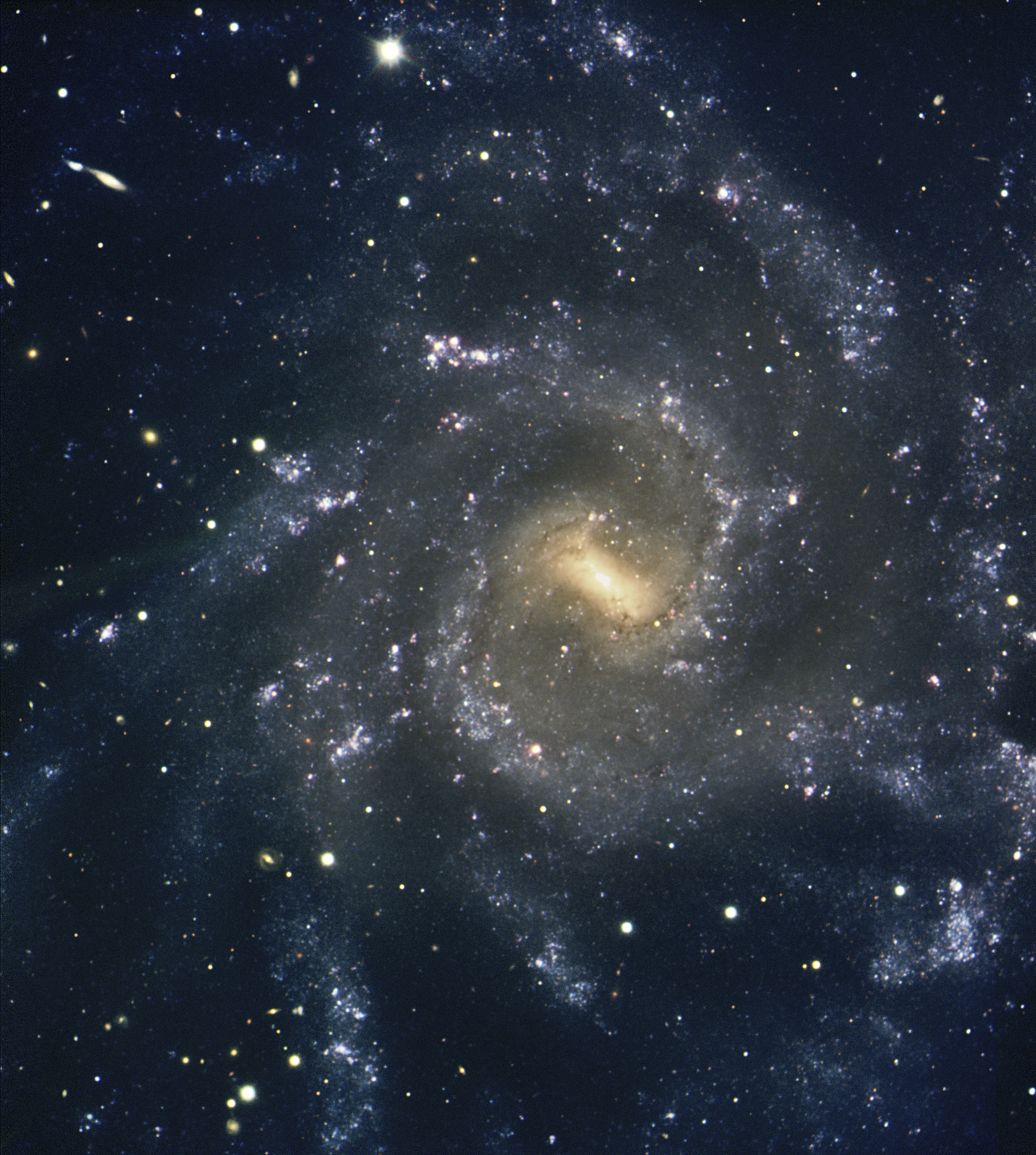
- NGC 7424 seen by VLT's wide-field imager VIMOS

Observation data (J2000 epoch)
- Constellation: Grus
- Right ascension: 22^{h} 57^{m} 18^{s}
- Declination: −41° 04′ 14″
- Redshift: 0.003132 (939 ± 2 km/s)
- Distance: 37.5 Mly (11.5 Mpc)
- Apparent magnitude (V): 11.0

Characteristics
- Type: SAB(rs)cd
- Apparent size (V): 9.5 x 8.1 arcmin
- Notable features: similar to the Milky Way

Other designations
- PGC 070096

NGC 7424 is a barred spiral galaxy located 37.5 million light-years away in the southern constellation Grus (the Crane). Its size (about 100,000 light-years) makes it similar to our own galaxy, the Milky Way. It is called a "grand design" galaxy because of its well defined spiral arms. Two supernovae and two ultraluminous X-ray sources have been discovered in NGC 7424.

== Characteristics ==
NGC 7424 is intermediate between normal spirals (SA) and strongly barred galaxies (SB). Other features include the presence of a central ring-like structure and a relatively low core brightness relative to the arms. The redder color of the prominent bar indicates an older population of stars while the bright blue color of the loose arms indicates the presence of ionised hydrogen and clusters of massive young stars. NGC 7424 is listed as a member of the IC 1459 Grus Group of galaxies, but is suspected of being a "field galaxy"; that is, not gravitationally bound to any group.

== Supernovae ==
Two supernovae have been observed in NGC 7424:

- SN 2001ig was a rare Type IIb supernova discovered by Australian amateur Robert Evans on the outer edge of NGC 7424 on 10 December 2001. Type IIb supernovae (SNe) initially exhibit spectral lines of hydrogen (like typical Type II's), but these disappear after a short time to be replaced by lines of oxygen, calcium and magnesium (like typical Type Ib's and Ic's).
- SN 2017bzb (Type II, mag. 13) was discovered by New Zealand astronomer Stuart Parker on 7 March, 2017.

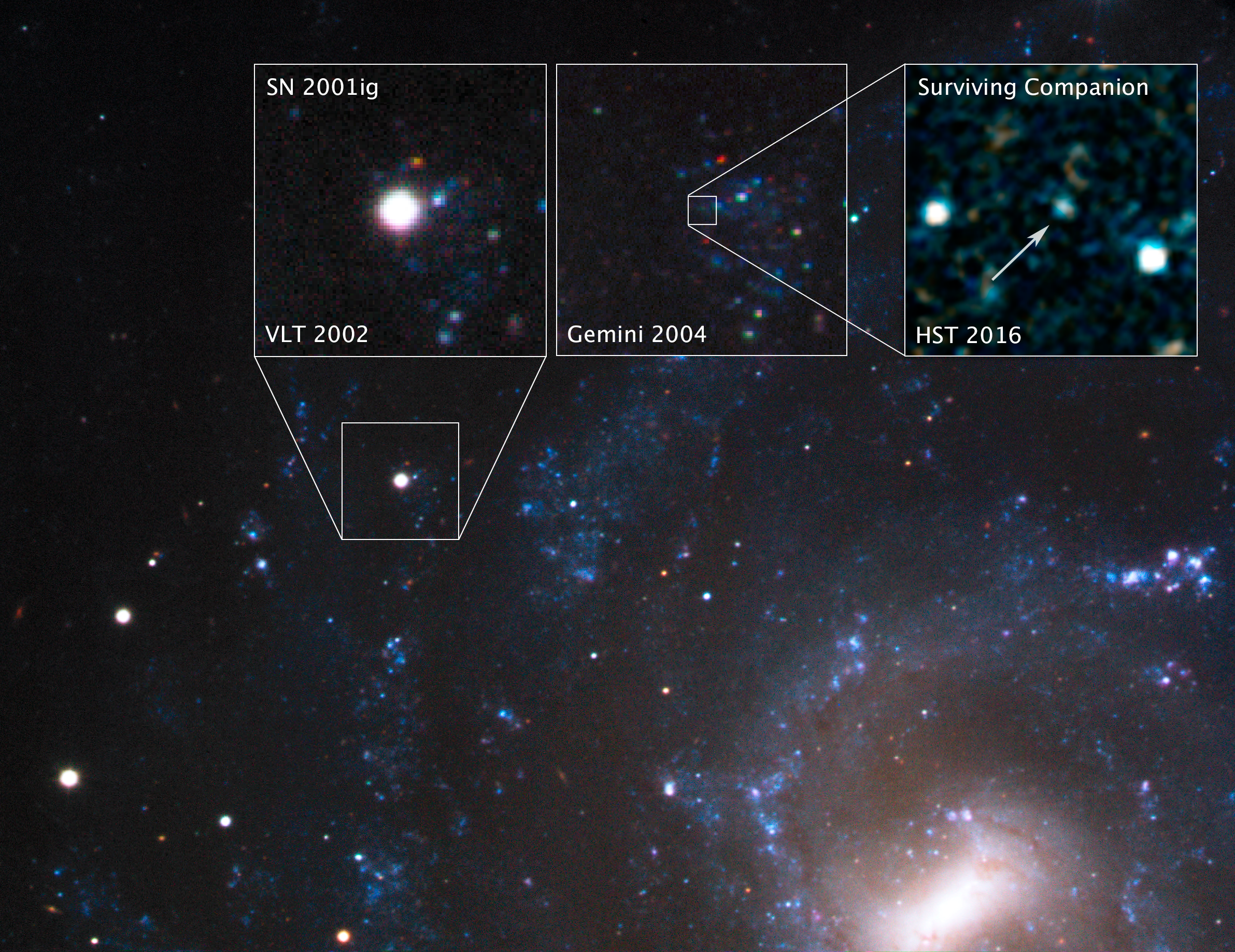
Hubble Space Telescope image of surviving companion to supernova SN 2001ig

In 2006, Anglo-Australian Observatory astronomer Stuart Ryder et al. found what they argued could be the binary companion to SN 2001ig using the Gemini Observatory. It is a massive A or F class star that had an eccentric orbit around the progenitor, a Wolf-Rayet star. They believe that the companion periodically stripped the outer hydrogen-rich envelope of the progenitor, accounting for the observed spectral changes. Princeton University fellow Alicia Soderberg et al. also believe that the progenitor was a Wolf-Rayet star, but suggest that the periodic mass loss was a result of the intense stellar wind these stars produce.

In a paper published in March 2018, Ryder et al. announced that the surviving companion had been observed with the Hubble Space Telescope in the ultraviolet. This is the first time a companion to a Type IIb supernova has been imaged.

== Ultraluminous X-ray sources ==
In May and June 2002, Roberto Soria and his colleagues at the Harvard-Smithsonian Center for Astrophysics discovered two Ultraluminous X-ray sources (ULXs) with the Chandra X-ray Observatory. ULXs are objects that emit tremendous amounts of X-rays (> 10^{32} watts or 10^{39} erg/s), assuming they radiate isotropically (the same in all directions). This amount is larger than currently understood stellar processes (including supernovae) but smaller than the amount of X-rays emitted by active galactic nuclei, which accounts for their alternate name, Intermediate-luminosity X-ray Objects (IXOs). The source designated ULX1 was found in a relatively empty interarm region, far from any bright clusters or star-forming complexes, and showed a 75% increase in X-ray luminosity over the course of 20 days. ULX2 was found in an exceptionally bright young stellar complex, and showed an order of magnitude increase over the same time period.
