= HD 207129 =

Star in the constellation Grus

- Location of HD 207129 (circled in red)

Observation data Epoch J2000.0 Equinox J2000.0 (ICRS)
- Constellation: Grus
- Right ascension: 21^{h} 48^{m} 15.7512^{s}
- Declination: −47° 18′ 13.018″
- Apparent magnitude (V): 5.57

Characteristics
- Evolutionary stage: main sequence
- Spectral type: G2V
- U−B color index: +0.08
- B−V color index: +0.60

Astrometry
Radial velocity (R_{v})	−7.55±0.12 km/s
Proper motion (μ)	RA: +165.069 mas/yr Dec.: −295.553 mas/yr
Parallax (π)	64.2717±0.0430 mas
Distance	50.75 ± 0.03 ly (15.56 ± 0.01 pc)
Absolute magnitude (M_{V})	+4.55

Details
Mass	1.06±0.01 M_{☉}
Radius	1.062±0.008 R_{☉}
Luminosity	1.219±0.007 L_{☉}
Surface gravity (log g)	4.47±0.01 cgs
Temperature	5,932±3 K
Metallicity [Fe/H]	−0.007±0.003 dex
Rotation	~12.6 days
Rotational velocity (v sin i)	2 km/s
Age	2.70+0.23 −0.28 Gyr

Other designations
- CD−47 13928, CPD−47 9758, FK5 1573, GC 30516, GJ 838, HD 207129, HIP 107649, HR 8323, SAO 230846, PPM 327579, CCDM J21483-4718A, WDS J21483-4718A, LTT 8704, NLTT 52100, IDS 21418-4746 A

Database references
SIMBAD	data

HD 207129 is a G-type main-sequence star about 50.7 light-years away in the constellation of Grus. It has an apparent visual magnitude of approximately 5.6. This is a Sun-like star with the same stellar classification (G2V) and a similar mass. It is roughly the same age as the Sun, but has a lower abundance of elements other than hydrogen and helium, which astronomers refer to as the star's metallicity.

Image of the disk from the REASONS survey

A debris disk has been imaged around this star in visible light using the ACS instrument on the Hubble Space Telescope; it has also been imaged in the infrared (70 μm) using the MIPS instrument on the Spitzer Space Telescope. Based on the ACS image, the disk appears to have a radius of about 163 astronomical units and to be about 30 AU wide, and to be inclined at 60° to the plane of the sky.

Another star, CCDM J21483-4718B (also designated CD−47 13929 or WDS J21483-4718B), of apparent visual magnitude 8.7, has been observed 55 arcseconds away from this star, but based on comparison of proper motions, it is believed to be an optical double and not physically related to its companion. Gaia astrometry shows that this star has a much smaller parallax than HD 207129, confirming that it is an unrelated background star.

The HD 207129 planetary system
Companion (in order from star)	Mass	Semimajor axis (AU)	Orbital period (days)	Eccentricity	Inclination (°)	Radius
circumstellar disc	150±2 AU				60.7+1.0 −0.9°	—
