= Tau2 Gruis =

Double star in the constellation Grus

Tau^{2} Gruis
Observation data Epoch J2000.0 Equinox J2000.0 (ICRS)
- Constellation: Grus
- Right ascension: 22^{h} 55^{m} 15.99534^{s}
- Declination: −48° 29′ 30.3028″
- Apparent magnitude (V): 6.71 (7.30+ 7.50)

Characteristics
- Evolutionary stage: main sequence
- Spectral type: F6/8 V:
- B−V color index: +0.46

Astrometry
Radial velocity (R_{v})	0.7±0.3 km/s
Proper motion (μ)	RA: −225.658 mas/yr Dec.: +55.712 mas/yr
Parallax (π)	22.3461±0.0241 mas
Distance	146.0 ± 0.2 ly (44.75 ± 0.05 pc)
Absolute magnitude (M_{V})	+3.43 (combined)

Details

A
Mass	1.21 M_{☉}

B
Mass	1.16 M_{☉}

Other designations
- τ^{2} Gru, 71 G. Gruis, CD−49°13997, CPD−49°11676, GC 31952, HD 216656, HIP 113190, SAO 231353, WDS J22553-4828CD

Database references
SIMBAD	data

Tau^{2} Gruis, Latinized from τ^{2} Gruis is a binary star located in the constellation Grus. It has a combined apparent magnitude of 6.71, making it a challenge to view with the naked eye, even under ideal conditions. The system is located relatively close at a distance of 146 light-years based on Gaia DR3 parallax measurements, but it is slowly receding with a heliocentric radial velocity of 0.7 km/s. At its current distance, Tau^{2} Gruis' combined brightness is diminished by an interstellar extinction of 0.12 magnitudes and it has a combined absolute magnitude of +3.43.

The pair was first discovered by astronomer W.H. van den Bos in 1944. The primary has an apparent magnitude of 7.30 while the secondary has an apparent magnitude of 7.50. Their current separation is 0.114", making it difficult to resolve their individual properties; the companion is located at a position angle of 267° as of 1964. The period of Tau^{2} Gruis is not well known, but it is estimated to be 7.423 years. Subsequent observations suggest that the pair may be spurious. This system is often confused with HD 216655, a slightly brighter binary system. HD 216655 is located 93.9" away from Tau^{2} Gruis and they appear to share a common proper motion.

The system has a blended stellar classification of F6/8 V:, indicating that it is a F-type star with the characteristics of a F6 and F8 main sequence star. However, there is uncertainty about the luminosity class. The primary has 1.21 times the mass of the Sun while the companion has 1.16 times the mass of the Sun.
