= NGC 7410 =

Galaxy in the constellation Grus

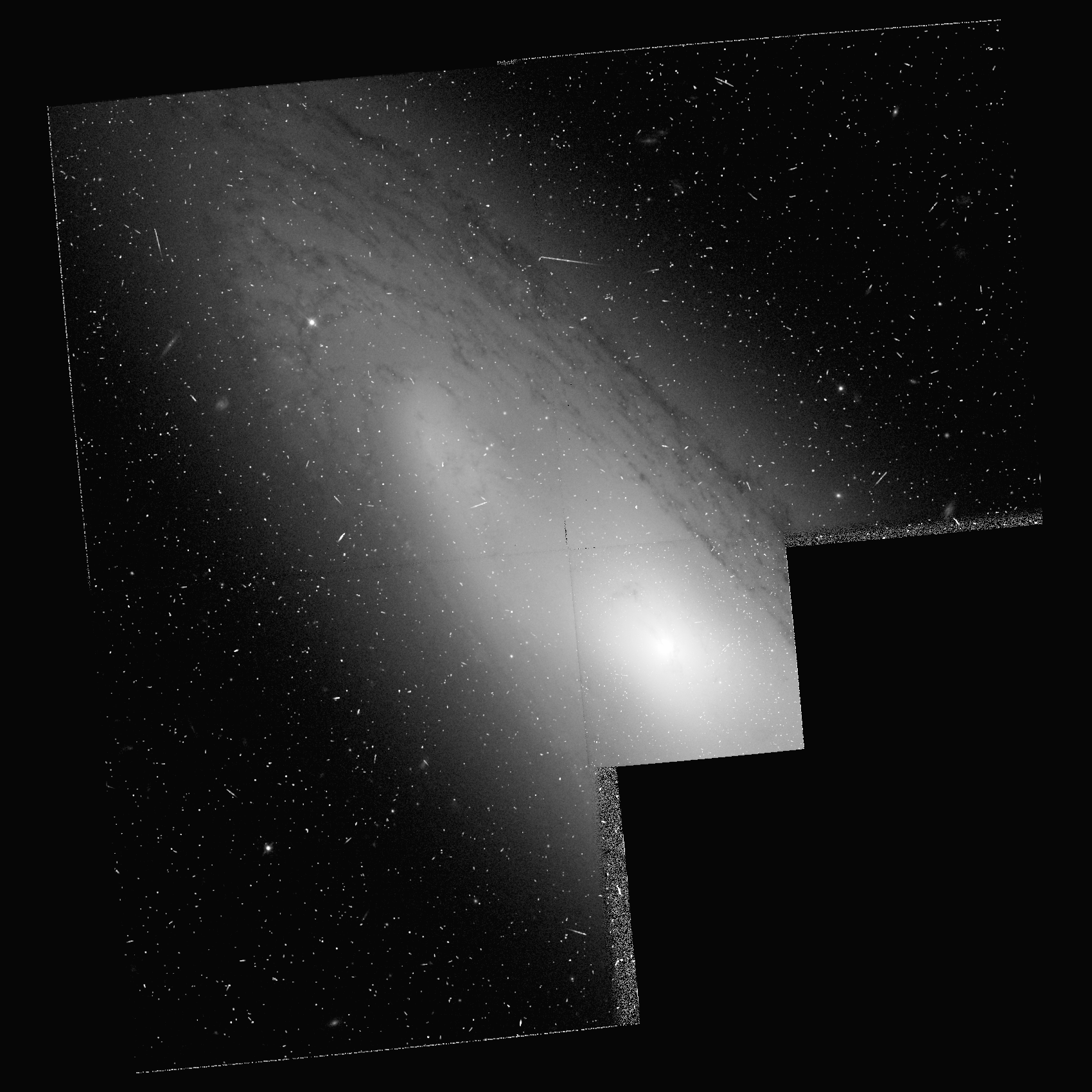
- HST image of NGC 7410

Observation data (J2000 epoch)
- Constellation: Grus
- Right ascension: 22^{h} 55^{m} 00.9^{s}
- Declination: −39° 39′ 41″

Characteristics
- Type: SB(s)a

Other designations
- ESO 346- G 012, ESO 225211-3955.7, MCG -07-47-002, WISEA J225500.88-393940.9

NGC 7410 is a barred spiral galaxy located in the constellation Grus. It is about 122 million light-years away. It was discovered by James Dunlop on 15 July 1826.

== Supernova ==
One supernova has been observed in NGC 7410: SN 2014ba (Type Ia-pec, mag. 14.7) was discovered by Stuart Parker on 7 May 2014.
