= Omicron Gruis =

Variable star in the constellation Grus

Observation data Epoch J2000.0 Equinox J2000.0 (ICRS)
- Constellation: Grus
- Right ascension: 23^{h} 26^{m} 36.57748^{s}
- Declination: −52° 43′ 17.7656″
- Apparent magnitude (V): 5.52

Characteristics
- Spectral type: F4 V + M3/M4
- B−V color index: +0.40
- Variable type: δ Sct

Astrometry
Proper motion (μ)	RA: +34.52 mas/yr Dec.: +130.66 mas/yr
Parallax (π)	32.50±0.37 mas
Distance	100 ± 1 ly (30.8 ± 0.4 pc)
Absolute magnitude (M_{V})	3.01

Details

ο Gru A
Mass	1.31 M_{☉}
Surface gravity (log g)	4.19 cgs
Temperature	6,763±230 K
Metallicity [Fe/H]	0.10 dex
Rotational velocity (v sin i)	20.4±0.3 km/s
Age	1.026 Gyr

ο Gru B
Mass	0.3 M_{☉}
Age	1.1 Gyr

Other designations
- ο Gru, CD−53°10461, HD 220729, HIP 115713, HR 8907, SAO 247874

Database references
SIMBAD	data

ο Gruis, Latinised as Omicron Gruis, is a binary or triple star system in the southern constellation of Grus. It is faintly visible to the naked eye with an apparent visual magnitude of 5.52. Based upon an annual parallax shift of 32.50 mas as seen from the Earth, the system is located 100 light years from the Sun.

The pair form a close spectroscopic binary system with a physical separation of about 14.9 astronomical units. The primary component is an F-type main sequence star with a stellar classification of F4 V, a star that is currently fusing its core hydrogen. It is a probable delta scuti variable showing periodicities of 4.7 and 5.5 cycles per day with amplitudes of 0.014 and 0.011 magnitudes, respectively. The secondary companion is a red dwarf with a mass of about 0.3 solar, suggesting a class of M3/M4. Ehrenreich et al. (2010) noted the detection of a tertiary companion that is not causing the detected radial velocity shifts which would make this a triple star system.
