= PSR J2144−3933 =

Radio pulsar in the constellation Grus

Observation data Epoch J2000 Equinox J2000
- Constellation: Grus
- Right ascension: 21^{h} 44^{m} 12.01^{s}
- Declination: −39° 33′ 58.4″

Characteristics
- Spectral type: Pulsar

Astrometry
Distance	approx. 587 ly (approx. 180 pc)

Details
Temperature	< 42,000 K
Rotation	8.509827983 s
Age	272 Myr

Other designations
- EUVE J2144-39.6

Database references
SIMBAD	data

PSR J2144−3933 is a pulsar about 180 parsecs (587 light-years) from Earth. It is the coldest known neutron star with a surface temperature less than 42,000 Kelvin as measured by the Hubble Space Telescope. It was previously thought to have a period of 2.84 seconds but is now known to have a period of 8.5098 seconds, which is among the longest-known radio pulsars.

PSR J2144−3933 is also notable for other reasons: its mean pulse profile is very narrow in comparison to the pulse period, with a half-intensity width of less than one degree of longitude. It also has the lowest spindown luminosity of any pulsar at about 3×10^{21} W.

Writing in Nature, astrophysicists M. D. Young and coworkers consider this object and suggest that its existence throws current theories into doubt. They state:

Moreover, under the usual model assumptions, based on the neutron-star equations of state, this slowly rotating pulsar should not be emitting a radio beam. Therefore either the model assumptions are wrong, or current theories of radio emission must be revised

The fact that PSR J2144−3933 is the coldest observed neutron star has been exploited to constrain the properties of dark matter.
