= RZ Gruis =

Star in the constellation of Grus

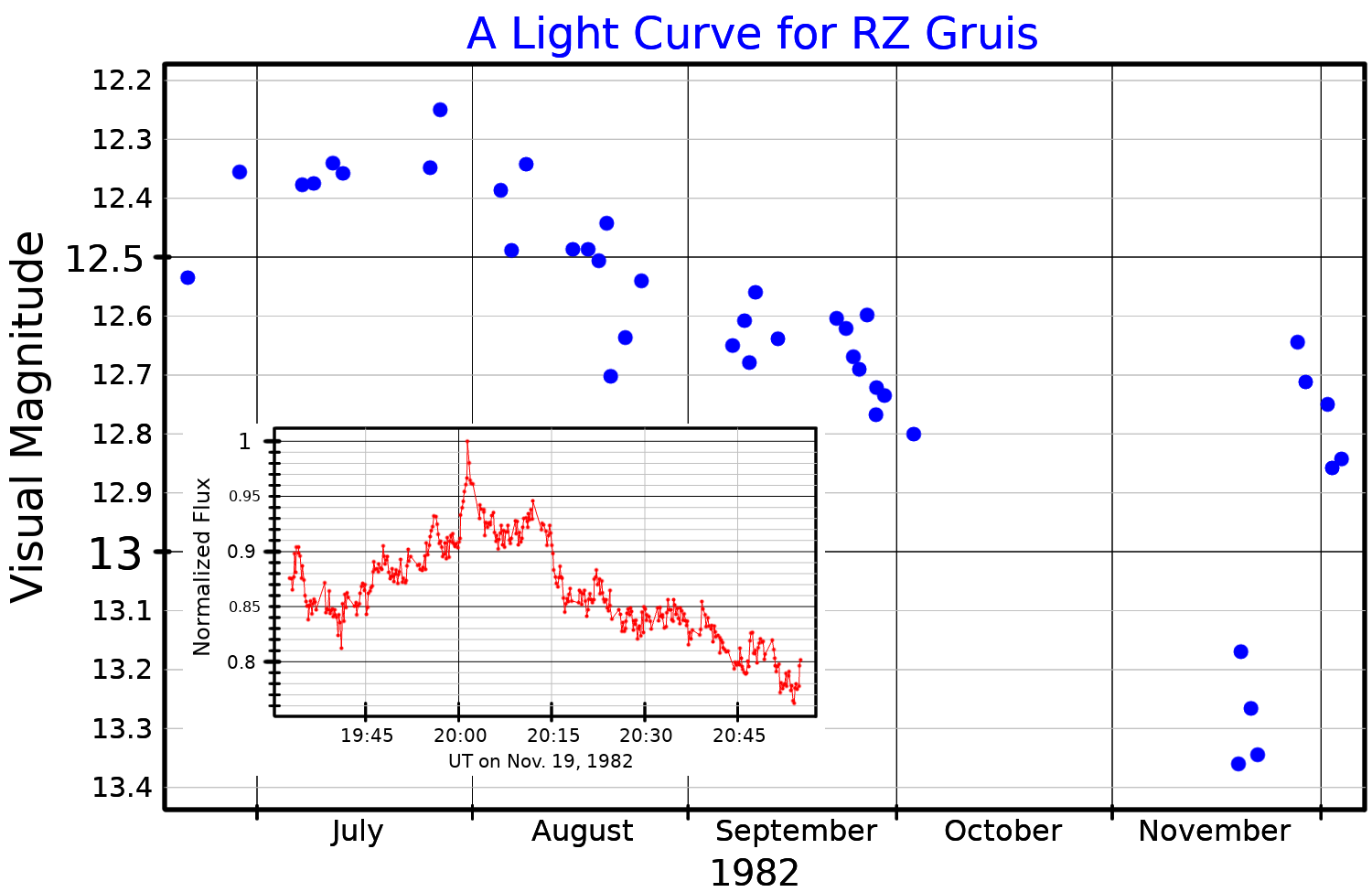
- A visual band light curve for RZ Gruis. The main plot shows the long term variation, and the inset plot shows the short term variability. Adapted from Sickland et al. (1984)

Observation data Epoch J2000 Equinox ICRS
- Constellation: Grus
- Right ascension: 22^{h} 47^{m} 12.007^{s}
- Declination: −42° 44′ 38.72″
- Apparent magnitude (V): 11.6 - 13.6

Characteristics
- Variable type: UX Ursae Majoris

Astrometry
| Proper motion (μ) | RA: +23.779±0.019 mas/yr Dec.: +0.095±0.017 mas/yr |
| Parallax (π) | 1.8421±0.0588 mas |
| Distance | 1,770 ± 60 ly (540 ± 20 pc) |

Details

Other designations
- 2MASS J22471199-4244385, AAVSO 2241-43, Gaia DR2 6544371342567818496

Database references
| SIMBAD | data |

RZ Gruis is a nova-like binary system in the constellation Grus composed of a white dwarf and an F-type main-sequence star. It is generally of apparent magnitude of 12.3 with occasional dimming to 13.4. Its components are thought to orbit each other roughly every 8.5 to 10 hours (much longer than most nova-like variables, which have periods of around 3 to 4 hours). It belongs to the UX Ursae Majoris subgroup of cataclysmic variable star systems, where material from the donor star is drawn to the white dwarf where it forms an accretion disc that remains bright and outshines the two component stars. The system is around 1,434 light-years away from Earth; or as much as 1,770 light years based on a Gaia parallax.

Originally named and discovered to be variable in 1949, RZ Gruis was discovered to be a cataclysmic variable after its spectrum was investigated in 1980. Considered initially to be a hot, blue B-type star, it was found to have Balmer emission lines of the hydrogen atom. If it were indeed a B-type main-sequence star (and hence lie at a remote 35,000 light-years' distance), it would lie well out of the galactic plane. The investigators proposed that the emission lines have arisen from an accretion disc around a white dwarf rather than from the star itself. The system is poorly known, though the donor star has been calculated to be of spectral type F5V. These stars have spectra very similar to novae that have returned to quiescence after outbursts, yet they have not been observed to have erupted themselves. The American Association of Variable Star Observers recommends watching this class of star for future events such as possible nova eruptions.
