= Sigma1 Gruis =

Star in the constellation Grus

Sigma^{1} Gruis
Observation data Epoch J2000.0 Equinox J2000.0 (ICRS)
- Constellation: Grus
- Right ascension: 22^{h} 36^{m} 29.30230^{s}
- Declination: −40° 34′ 57.7391″
- Apparent magnitude (V): 6.26

Characteristics
- Spectral type: A3 Vn
- B−V color index: +0.12

Astrometry
Radial velocity (R_{v})	+6.9±3.4 km/s
Proper motion (μ)	RA: +46.00 mas/yr Dec.: −72.64 mas/yr
Parallax (π)	14.2651±0.0751 mas
Distance	229 ± 1 ly (70.1 ± 0.4 pc)
Absolute magnitude (M_{V})	+2.11

Details
Mass	2.00 M_{☉}
Radius	2.0 R_{☉}
Luminosity	12 L_{☉}
Surface gravity (log g)	4.24±0.14 cgs
Temperature	9,230±314 K
Rotational velocity (v sin i)	163.4±2.0 km/s
Age	194 Myr

Other designations
- σ^{1} Gru, CD−41°14959, FK5 3811, HD 214085, HIP 111594, HR 8600, SAO 231211

Database references
SIMBAD	data

Sigma^{1} Gruis, a Latinization of σ^{1} Gruis, is a star in the constellation Grus. It is a dim, white-hued star near the lower limit for visibility to the naked eye with an apparent visual magnitude of 6.26. This object is located 229 light-years (70.1 pc) distant from the Sun based on parallax. The radial velocity of this star is poorly constrained, but it appears to be drifting further away at the rate of +7 km/s.

This is an A-type main-sequence star with a stellar classification of A2 Vn; a star that is currently fusing its core hydrogen. It has a relatively high rate of spin as indicated by the 'n' suffix, showing a projected rotational velocity of 163 km/s. This object is 194 million years old with double the mass and radius of the Sun. The star is radiating 12 times the luminosity of the Sun from its photosphere at an effective temperature of 9,230 K. It is a source of X-ray emission, which may indicate it has an unseen stellar companion.
