= Gliese 832 =

Star in the constellation Grus

- Location of Gliese 832 in the constellation Grus

Observation data Epoch J2000.0 Equinox ICRS
- Constellation: Grus
- Right ascension: 21^{h} 33^{m} 33.97512^{s}
- Declination: −49° 00′ 32.3994″
- Apparent magnitude (V): 8.66

Characteristics
- Evolutionary stage: main-sequence star
- Spectral type: M2V
- B−V color index: 1.52

Astrometry
Radial velocity (R_{v})	12.72±0.13 km/s
Proper motion (μ)	RA: −45.917 mas/yr Dec.: −816.875 mas/yr
Parallax (π)	201.3252±0.0237 mas
Distance	16.200 ± 0.002 ly (4.9671 ± 0.0006 pc)
Absolute magnitude (M_{V})	10.19

Details
Mass	0.449±0.009 M_{☉}
Radius	0.442 ± 0.018 R_{☉}
Luminosity (bolometric)	0.0276 ± 0.0009 L_{☉}
Luminosity (visual, L_{V})	0.007 (Note: Using the absolute visual magnitude of Gliese 832 $\scriptstyle M_{V_{\ast}}=10.19$ and the absolute visual magnitude of the Sun $\scriptstyle M_{V_{\odot}}=4.83$, the visual luminosity can be calculated by $\scriptstyle \frac{L_{V_{\ast}}}{L_{V_{\odot}}}=10^{0.4\left(M_{V_{\odot}} - M_{V_{\ast}}\right)}$) L_{☉}
Surface gravity (log g)	4.7 cgs
Temperature	3,539+79 −74 K
Metallicity [Fe/H]	−0.06 ± 0.04 dex
Rotation	37.5+1.4 −1.5 d
Age	6±1.5 Gyr

Other designations
- CD−49°13515, GJ 832, HD 204961, HIP 106440, L 354-89, LHS 3685, PLX 5190, TIC 139754153, TYC 8431-60-1, 2MASS J21333397-4900323

Database references
SIMBAD	The star
- planet c
- planet b
Exoplanet Archive	data

Gliese 832 (Gl 832 or GJ 832) is a red dwarf star of spectral type M2V in the southern constellation Grus. The apparent visual magnitude of 8.66 means that it is too faint to be seen with the naked eye. It is located relatively close to the Sun, at a distance of 16.2 light-years and has a high proper motion of 818.16 milliarcseconds per year. Gliese 832 has just under half the mass and radius of the Sun. Its estimated rotation period is a relatively leisurely 46 days. The star is roughly 6 billion years old.

This star achieved perihelion some 52,920 years ago when it came within an estimated 15.71 ly (4.817 pc) of the Sun.

Gliese 832 emits X-rays. Despite the strong flare activity, Gliese 832 is producing on average less ionizing radiation than the Sun. Only at extremely short radiation wavelengths (<50 nm) does its radiation intensity rise above the level of the quiet Sun, but does not reach levels typical for the active Sun.

== Planetary system ==
Gliese 832 hosts one known planet, with a second planet having been refuted in 2022. No additional planets were found as of 2024.

The Gliese 832 planetary system
Companion (in order from star)	Mass	Semimajor axis (AU)	Orbital period (years)	Eccentricity	Inclination (°)	Radius
b	1.039+0.044 −0.043 M_{J}	3.651+0.071 −0.059	10.39+0.29 −0.22	0.021+0.027 −0.015	51±3 or 131.6+2.7 −3.4	—

=== Gliese 832 b ===
In September 2008, it was announced that a Jupiter-like planet, designated Gliese 832 b, had been detected in a long-period, near-circular orbit around this star, with a false alarm probability of a negligible 0.05%. It would induce an astrometric perturbation on its star of at least 0.95 milliarcseconds and is thus a good candidate for being detected by astrometric observations. Despite its relatively large angular distance, direct imaging is problematic due to the star–planet contrast. The planet was detected astrometrically by two different 2023 studies and one 2025 study, determining two plausible inclinations and revealing a true mass close to the mass of Jupiter.

=== Gliese 832 c ===
Gliese 832 c was the second reported planet in the Gliese 832 system, believed to be of super-Earth mass (minimum mass about 5 times the mass of Earth). It was announced to orbit in the optimistic habitable zone but outside the conservative habitable zone of its parent star. The planet Gliese 832 c was believed to be in, or very close to, the right distance from its sun to allow liquid water to exist on its surface. However, doubts were raised about the existence of planet c by a 2015 study, which found that its orbital period is close to the stellar rotation period. The existence of the planet was refuted in 2022, when a study found that the radial velocity signal shows characteristics of a signal originating from stellar activity, and not from a planet.

=== Limits on additional planets ===
A 2016 study found that additional planets are possible in the region between the two planets thought to exist at the time, in particular planets less than 15 Earth masses orbiting between 0.25-2.0 AU. As of 2024, no additional planets had been found and Gliese 832 b remains the only known planet in the system. The radial velocity data sets an upper limit of 1.5 Earth masses on any undetected planet with a period up to 100 days.

=== Search for cometary disc ===
If this system has a comet disc, it is not "brighter than the fractional dust luminosity 10^{−5}" according to a 2012 Herschel study.

== See also ==
- List of nearest stars
- List of extrasolar planets
