= Sigma2 Gruis =

Star in the constellation Grus

Sigma^{2} Gruis
Observation data Epoch J2000.0 Equinox J2000.0 (ICRS)
- Constellation: Grus
- Right ascension: 22^{h} 36^{m} 58.85405^{s}
- Declination: −40° 35′ 27.7272″
- Apparent magnitude (V): 5.86 (5.91 + 10.04)

Characteristics
- Evolutionary stage: main sequence
- Spectral type: A1 V
- U−B color index: +0.06
- B−V color index: +0.06

Astrometry
Radial velocity (R_{v})	+15.0±2.9 km/s
Proper motion (μ)	RA: +44.56 mas/yr Dec.: −70.07 mas/yr
Parallax (π)	15.19±0.53 mas
Distance	215 ± 7 ly (66 ± 2 pc)
Absolute magnitude (M_{V})	+1.76

Details

σ^{2} Gru A
Mass	2.15 M_{☉}
Luminosity	17.5 L_{☉}
Surface gravity (log g)	4.36±0.14 cgs
Temperature	9,549±325 K
Rotational velocity (v sin i)	80.9±0.7 km/s
Age	255 Myr

Other designations
- σ^{2} Gru, CD−41°14963, HD 214150, HIP 111643, HR 8602, SAO 231217, WDS J22370-4035

Database references
SIMBAD	data

Sigma^{2} Gruis is a binary star system in the southern constellation of Grus. Its apparent visual magnitude is 5.86. The pair had an angular separation of 2.7 arc seconds along a position angle of 265°, as of 1991. Located around 215 ly (66 pc) distant, the white-hued primary component is an A-type main-sequence star of spectral type A1V, a star that is currently fusing its core hydrogen. The much fainter secondary companion has a visual magnitude of 10.03.
