= Delta1 Gruis =

Variable star in the constellation Grus

δ^{1} Gruis
- Location of δ^{1} Gruis (circled)

Observation data Epoch J2000.0 Equinox J2000.0 (ICRS)
- Constellation: Grus
- Right ascension: 22^{h} 29^{m} 16.17481^{s}
- Declination: −43° 29′ 44.0245″
- Apparent magnitude (V): 4.0 - 4.2

Characteristics
- Spectral type: G6/8 III
- U−B color index: +0.81
- B−V color index: +1.03
- Variable type: SR

Astrometry
Radial velocity (R_{v})	+4.9±0.8 km/s
Proper motion (μ)	RA: +25.72 mas/yr Dec.: −3.32 mas/yr
Parallax (π)	10.54±0.22 mas
Distance	309 ± 6 ly (95 ± 2 pc)
Absolute magnitude (M_{V})	−1.1

Details
Mass	4.0 M_{☉}
Radius	24 R_{☉}
Luminosity	305 L_{☉}
Surface gravity (log g)	2.54±0.28 cgs
Temperature	5,013±88 K
Metallicity [Fe/H]	−0.23±0.09 dex
Rotational velocity (v sin i)	8.2 km/s

Other designations
- δ^{1} Gru, CD−44°14931, FK5 846, HD 213009, HIP 110997, HR 8556, SAO 231154, WDS J22293-4330A

Database references
SIMBAD	data

Delta^{1} Gruis, Latinized from δ^{1} Gruis, is a candidate binary star system in the constellation Grus. With a peak apparent visual magnitude of 4.0 it is bright enough to be seen with the naked eye at night. The distance to this system, as determined using an annual parallax shift of 10.54 mas as seen from the Earth, is around 309 light years. It is gradually moving away from the Sun with a radial velocity of +4.9 km/s.

The brighter component of this system is an evolved, yellow-hued, G-type giant star with a stellar classification of G6/8 III. It is a semiregular variable that ranges between apparent magnitudes 3.99 and 4.2, located 325 light-years from Earth. Delta^{1} Gruis has around 3 times the mass and 24 times the diameter of the Sun. The fainter companion is a magnitude 12.8 star at an angular separation of 5.6 arc seconds, as of 2008.

== See also ==
- List of stars in Grus
