= Nu Gruis =

Star in the constellation Grus

Observation data Epoch J2000.0 Equinox J2000.0 (ICRS)
- Constellation: Grus
- Right ascension: 22^{h} 28^{m} 39.21034^{s}
- Declination: −39° 07′ 54.4505″
- Apparent magnitude (V): 5.47

Characteristics
- Spectral type: G9 III
- B−V color index: +0.95

Astrometry
Radial velocity (R_{v})	+10.6 km/s
Proper motion (μ)	RA: +37.43 mas/yr Dec.: −160.51 mas/yr
Parallax (π)	11.6404±0.1235 mas
Distance	280 ± 3 ly (85.9 ± 0.9 pc)
Absolute magnitude (M_{V})	+0.76

Details
Radius	9.68+0.30 −0.26 R_{☉}
Luminosity	51.9+0.3 −0.7 L_{☉}
Surface gravity (log g)	2.63±0.08 cgs
Temperature	4,893±24 K
Metallicity [Fe/H]	−0.41±0.02 dex

Other designations
- ν Gru, CD−39°14723, FK5 845, HD 212953, HIP 110936, HR 8552, SAO 213850, WDS J22287-3908

Database references
SIMBAD	data

ν Gruis, Latinised as Nu Gruis, is a solitary, yellow-hued star in the southern constellation of Grus. It is visible to the naked eye with an apparent visual magnitude of 5.47. The distance to this star, as determined using an annual parallax shift of 11.6 mas as seen from the Earth, is 280 light years. It is drifting further away with a heliocentric radial velocity of +11 km/s.

This is an evolved G-type giant star with a stellar classification of G9 III, a star that has used up its core hydrogen and has expanded. At present it has ten times the radius of the Sun and is radiating 52 times the Sun's luminosity from its enlarged photosphere at an effective temperature of 4,893 K. It has a visual magnitude 12.50 companion, not visible even through binoculars, located at an angular separation of 21.70 arc seconds along a position angle of 74°, as of 2011.
