= CE Gruis =

Binary star system in the constellation Grus

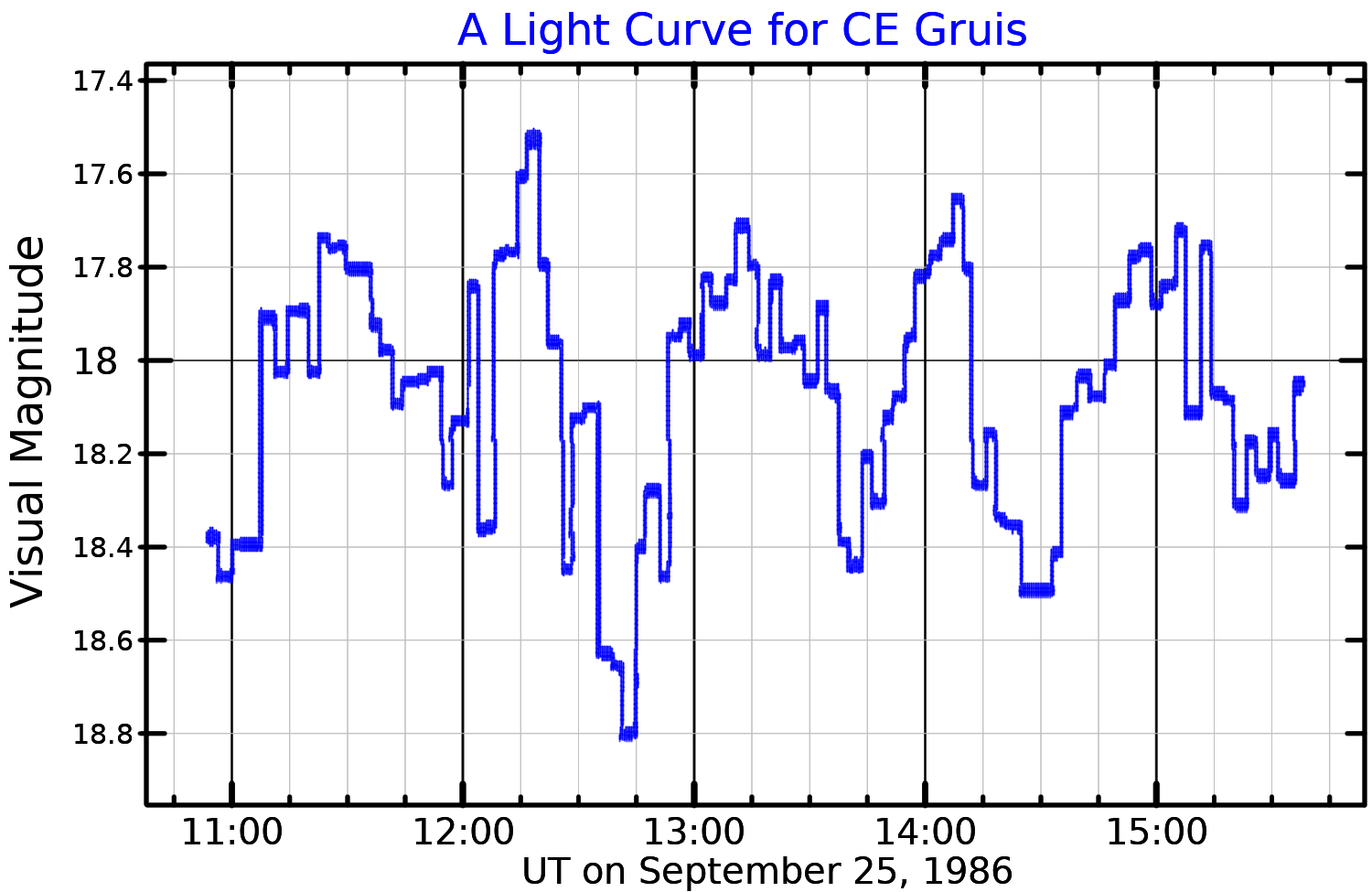
- A visual band light curve for CE Gruis, adapted from Tuohy et al. (1987)

Observation data Epoch J2000.0 Equinox J2000.0
- Constellation: Grus
- Right ascension: 21^{h} 37^{m} 56.38^{s}
- Declination: −43° 42′ 13.1″
- Apparent magnitude (V): ~18

Characteristics
- Variable type: AM Her

Details

White dwarf
Mass	~1.0 M_{☉}

Other designations
- Gru V1

Database references
SIMBAD	data

CE Gruis is a faint binary star system in the constellation Grus. It is a variable star, with a B-band brightness that ranges from a peak magnitude of 17.4 down to a minimum of 19.5 over a period of 108.6 minutes. The system is composed of a white dwarf and donor star, locked into a close, synchronous orbit. In such systems, known as polars, material from the donor star does not form an accretion disc around the white dwarf because of its intense magnetic field, but rather streams directly onto it along columns.

This was first identified as a system of interest by M. R. S. Hawkins in 1983 as part of a survey of faint variable objects in the Grus constellation. Catalogued as Grus V-1, it was found to show a high degree of variability as well as an intense emission of ionized helium. These properties suggested it may be a cataclysmic variable of the AM Herculis type. The binary period of 108.6 minutes lay within the range of 100–115 minute periods that a majority of known AM Her systems displayed. The system's emission pattern shows a blue and red component that is characteristic of cyclotron emission from accretion tunnels along a dipolar axis. Finally, the repeating modulation of the variability didn't match the erratic pattern observed with accretion disks.

In 1990, strong circular polarization was observed coming from this system, which confirmed its identity as a polar. The cyclotron emission is coming from two regions on the surface of the white dwarf; the first polar to have two emission regions identified. The so-called 'blue pole' is visible throughout the orbit and thus is located on the hemisphere above the orbital plane. In contrast, the 'red pole' is eclipsed by the white dwarf for about 70% of the orbit. However, the red pole is likely the dominant emission region on the surface. The emission regions are linearly extended and lie at 30° offsets from the magnetic poles. They are nearly aligned with the axis of rotation.

X-ray emissions were first detected from this system in 2002 as part of a survey of polars by the XMM-Newton space observatory. The X-ray spectrum must be fitted using a shock-based model caused by a sudden change in acceleration; there are no soft X-rays that are seen on other polars, possibly as a result of blobby accretion. The white dwarf has an estimated mass about equal to the mass of the Sun.
