= Rho Gruis =

Star in the constellation Grus

- Location of ρ Gruis (circled in red)

Observation data Epoch J2000.0 Equinox J2000.0 (ICRS)
- Constellation: Grus
- Right ascension: 22^{h} 43^{m} 29.97654^{s}
- Declination: −41° 24′ 51.6467″
- Apparent magnitude (V): 4.847

Characteristics
- Evolutionary stage: horizontal branch
- Spectral type: K0 III
- U−B color index: +0.807
- B−V color index: +1.026

Astrometry
Radial velocity (R_{v})	30.89±0.15 km/s
Proper motion (μ)	RA: +10.11 mas/yr Dec.: −93.79 mas/yr
Parallax (π)	14.16±0.19 mas
Distance	230 ± 3 ly (70.6 ± 0.9 pc)
Absolute magnitude (M_{V})	0.685

Details
Mass	1.91 M_{☉}
Radius	12.15+0.19 −0.65 R_{☉}
Luminosity	66.9±1.3 L_{☉}
Surface gravity (log g)	2.62 cgs
Temperature	4736.67+131.83 −36.67 K
Metallicity [Fe/H]	−0.20 dex

Other designations
- ρ Gru, CD−42°16049, FK5 3818, HD 215104, HIP 112203, HR 8644, SAO 231265

Database references
SIMBAD	data

Rho Gruis, a Latinization of ρ Gruis, is a solitary star in the southern constellation of Grus. It is visible to the naked eye as a faint, orange-hued star with an apparent visual magnitude of 4.85. Based upon an annual parallax shift of 14.16 mas as seen from the Earth, the system is located about 230 light years from the Sun. It is drifting further away with a radial velocity of 31 km/s.

This object is an evolved K-type giant star with a stellar classification of K0 III. It has exhausted the supply of hydrogen at its core, causing it to cool and expand. At present it has 12 times the radius of the Sun. With 1.9 times the mass of the Sun it is a red clump star, which indicates it is on the horizontal branch generating energy through helium fusion at its core. It is radiating 67 times the luminosity of the Sun from its enlarged photosphere at an effective temperature of 4,737 K.

Rho Gruis has two visual companions: a magnitude 14.0 star at an angular separation of 19.3″ along a position angle (PA) of 302°, as of 2011, and a magnitude 10.28 star with a separation of 114.20″ and a PA of 336°, as of 1999.
