= HD 215456 =

Star in the constellation Grus

Observation data Epoch J2000.0 Equinox J2000.0
- Constellation: Grus
- Right ascension: 22^{h} 46^{m} 08.37168^{s}
- Declination: −48° 58′ 44.5299″
- Apparent magnitude (V): 6.63

Characteristics
- Evolutionary stage: subgiant
- Spectral type: G0.5V
- B−V color index: 0.636±0.006

Astrometry
Radial velocity (R_{v})	−18.82±0.12 km/s
Proper motion (μ)	RA: +207.630 mas/yr Dec.: −48.230 mas/yr
Parallax (π)	25.3417±0.0211 mas
Distance	128.7 ± 0.1 ly (39.46 ± 0.03 pc)
Absolute magnitude (M_{V})	3.73

Details
Mass	1.207±0.060 M_{☉}
Radius	1.71±0.03 R_{☉}
Luminosity	3.020±0.008 L_{☉}
Surface gravity (log g)	4.12 cgs
Temperature	5,818+45 −46 K
Metallicity [Fe/H]	−0.07±0.03 dex
Rotational velocity (v sin i)	2.3±0.2 km/s
Age	7.5+0.7 −0.8 Gyr

Other designations
- CD−49°13955, FK5 6008, HD 215456, HIP 112414, SAO 231285, NLTT 54757, 2MASS J22460804-4858437

Database references
SIMBAD	data

HD 215456 is a star in the southern constellation Grus. It is a dim, yellow-hued star that lies just below the normal limit for visibility to the naked eye with an apparent visual magnitude of 6.63. The distance to this star is 129 light years based on parallax, and it has an absolute magnitude of 3.73. It is drifting closer with a radial velocity of −18.9 km/s.

This object is a solar-type main-sequence star with a stellar classification of G0.5V. It is about 7.5 billion years old with a projected rotational velocity of 2.3 km/s. The star has 1.2 times the mass of the Sun and 1.7 times the Sun's radius. The metallicity, or abundance of elements with higher atomic numbers than helium, is slightly below solar. The star is radiating triple the luminosity of the Sun from its photosphere at an effective temperature of 5,818 K.

== Planetary system ==
HD 215456 has two candidate planets that are around 32 and 76 times as massive as the earth with orbital periods of just under 192 and 2226 days, respectively. These were detected by the HARPS survey in 2011. The two planets were listed as confirmed on exoplanet.eu in 2020.

The HD 215456 planetary system
Companion (in order from star)	Mass	Semimajor axis (AU)	Orbital period (days)	Eccentricity	Inclination	Radius
b	>0.101 M_{J}	0.652	191.99	0.15	—	—
c	>0.246 M_{J}	3.394	2277	0.19	—	—
