= WASP-95 =

Star in the constellation Grus

Observation data Epoch J2000 Equinox J2000
- Constellation: Grus
- Right ascension: 22^{h} 29^{m} 49.73551^{s}
- Declination: −48° 00′ 11.0487″
- Apparent magnitude (V): 10.09

Characteristics
- Spectral type: G2

Astrometry
Radial velocity (R_{v})	6.30±0.16 km/s
Proper motion (μ)	RA: 92.151(11) mas/yr Dec.: −6.905(14) mas/yr
Parallax (π)	7.2379±0.0157 mas
Distance	450.6 ± 1.0 ly (138.2 ± 0.3 pc)

Details
Mass	1.110±0.090 M_{☉}
Radius	1.130+0.080 −0.040 R_{☉}
Temperature	5830±140 K
Metallicity [Fe/H]	0.14±0.16 dex
Rotational velocity (v sin i)	3.10±0.60 km/s
Age	5.0+2.8 −1.8 Gyr

Other designations
- CD−48 14223, CPD−48 10759, TOI-105, TIC 144065872, WASP-95, TYC 8442-960-1, GSC 08442-00960, 2MASS J22294972-4800111

Database references
SIMBAD	data

WASP-95 is a star 451 light-years (138 parsecs) away in the constellation Grus. With an apparent magnitude of 10.1, it is not visible to the naked eye. Its spectral type of G2 means it is a yellow sunlike star.

== Planetary system ==
In 2013, a planet was discovered around WASP-95. The planet, WASP-95b, is a hot Jupiter about 10% more massive than Jupiter, and completes an orbit round its star every two days. It was discovered by its transit of the star in 2013. The planet's equilibrium temperature is 1692.6±40.4 K.

The WASP-95 planetary system
Companion (in order from star)	Mass	Semimajor axis (AU)	Orbital period (days)	Eccentricity	Inclination	Radius
b	1.206+0.065 −0.067 M_{J}	0.0312±0.0022	2.18466560(11)	<0.018	85.9411+0.0065 −0.0066°	1.098±0.088 R_{J}
