= Pi2 Gruis =

Binary star system in the constellation Grus

Pi^{2} Gruis
- Location of π^{2} Gruis (circled in red)

Observation data Epoch J2000.0 Equinox J2000.0 (ICRS)
- Constellation: Grus
- Right ascension: 22^{h} 23^{m} 07.98704^{s}
- Declination: −45° 55′ 42.5582″
- Apparent magnitude (V): 5.622 (5.71 + 11.3)

Characteristics
- Spectral type: F3 III-IV or F0 V
- U−B color index: +0.016
- B−V color index: +0.365

Astrometry
Radial velocity (R_{v})	3.0 km/s
Proper motion (μ)	RA: +233.166 mas/yr Dec.: −58.205 mas/yr
Parallax (π)	25.1061±0.1256 mas
Distance	129.9 ± 0.6 ly (39.8 ± 0.2 pc)
Absolute magnitude (M_{V})	2.62

Details

π^{2} Gru A
Mass	1.37 M_{☉}
Radius	1.93±0.07 R_{☉}
Luminosity	7.15±0.04 L_{☉}
Surface gravity (log g)	4.20 cgs
Temperature	6788+138 −101 K
Metallicity [Fe/H]	−0.06 dex
Age	758 Myr

Other designations
- π^{2} Gru, CD−46°14295, FK5 3786, HD 212132, HIP 110506, HR 8524, SAO 231111, WDS J22231-4556

Database references
SIMBAD	data

π^{2} Gruis, Latinised as Pi^{2} Gruis, is a binary star system in the southern constellation of Grus. It is faintly visible to the naked eye as a yellow-white hued star with an apparent visual magnitude of 5.622. Based upon an annual parallax shift of 25.1 mas as seen from the Earth, the system is located 130 light years from the Sun.

The primary, component A, is an F-type star of uncertain luminosity class. Malaroda (1975) gave it a stellar classification of F3 III-IV, which would indicate an evolving subgiant/giant star hybrid spectrum, whereas Houk (1978) listed it as class F0 V, suggesting that it is an F-type main sequence star. It has been considered to be a chemically peculiar star, but this is now considered doubtful. It is 758 million years old with 1.4 times the mass of the Sun. The star is 1.9 times the Sun's radius and is radiating 7 times the luminosity of the Sun from its photosphere at an effective temperature of 6,788 K.

The companion is a magnitude 11.3 star at an angular separation of 4.6 arc seconds. Gaia Data Release 2 has measured a separate annual parallax for it of 25.3266±0.0871 mas, almost identical to the primary star, and indicates that it is a red dwarf.
