= Zeta Gruis =

Star in the constellation Grus

- Location of ζ Gruis (circled in red)

Observation data Epoch J2000.0 Equinox J2000.0 (ICRS)
- Constellation: Grus
- Right ascension: 23^{h} 00^{m} 52.79777^{s}
- Declination: −52° 45′ 14.8705″
- Apparent magnitude (V): 4.12

Characteristics
- Spectral type: K1 III Fe−1.2 CN−0.5
- U−B color index: +0.722
- B−V color index: +0.967

Astrometry
Radial velocity (R_{v})	−1.1±2.7 km/s
Proper motion (μ)	RA: −57.911 mas/yr Dec.: −13.371 mas/yr
Parallax (π)	24.5452±0.5124 mas
Distance	133 ± 3 ly (40.7 ± 0.9 pc)
Absolute magnitude (M_{V})	+1.49

Details
Mass	1.44±0.06 M_{☉}
Radius	8.83±0.21 R_{☉}
Luminosity	39.4±1.7 L_{☉}
Surface gravity (log g)	2.759±0.077 cgs
Temperature	4,865±22 K
Metallicity [Fe/H]	−0.308±0.018 dex
Rotational velocity (v sin i)	<1.3 km/s

Other designations
- ζ Gru, CPD−53°10382, FK5 868, HD 217364, HIP 113638, HR 8747, SAO 247680

Database references
SIMBAD	data

Zeta Gruis, Latinised from ζ Gruis, is a solitary star in the southern constellation of Grus. It is visible to the naked eye as a faint, orange-hued star with an apparent visual magnitude of 4.12. Based upon an annual parallax shift of 24.5 mas as seen from the Earth, the system is located about 133 light-years from the Sun.

This is an evolved K-type giant star with a stellar classification of K1 III Fe−1.2 CN−0.5, where the suffix notation indicates underabundances of iron and cyanogen in the spectrum. Having exhausted the supply of hydrogen at its core, the star has expanded and cooled; at present it has 9 times the girth of the Sun. The star is radiating 39 times the luminosity of the Sun from its swollen photosphere at an effective temperature of 4,865 K.
