= Eta Gruis =

Star in the constellation Grus

- Location of η Gruis (circled in red)

Observation data Epoch J2000.0 Equinox J2000.0 (ICRS)
- Constellation: Grus
- Right ascension: 22^{h} 45^{m} 37.88194^{s}
- Declination: −53° 30′ 00.4315″
- Apparent magnitude (V): 4.85

Characteristics
- Evolutionary stage: red giant branch
- Spectral type: K2 III CNIV
- U−B color index: +1.17
- B−V color index: +1.18

Astrometry
Radial velocity (R_{v})	+27.8±2.8 km/s
Proper motion (μ)	RA: +30.717 mas/yr Dec.: +17.334 mas/yr
Parallax (π)	7.2136±0.1013 mas
Distance	452 ± 6 ly (139 ± 2 pc)
Absolute magnitude (M_{V})	−0.68

Details
Mass	4.4 M_{☉}
Radius	33 R_{☉}
Luminosity	355 L_{☉}
Surface gravity (log g)	1.52 cgs
Temperature	4,491 K
Rotational velocity (v sin i)	3.3 km/s

Other designations
- η Gru, CPD−54°10123, FK5 3821, HD 215369, HIP 112374, HR 8655, SAO 247570, WDS J22456-5330A

Database references
SIMBAD	data

Eta Gruis, Latinized from η Gruis, is a solitary star in the southern constellation of Grus. It is visible to the naked eye as a faint, orange-hued star with an apparent visual magnitude of 4.85. Based upon an annual parallax shift of 7.2 mas as seen from the Earth, the system is located about 452 light years from the Sun. The star is drifting further away with a radial velocity of +28 km/s.

This object is an evolved K-type giant star with a stellar classification of K2 III CNIV, where the suffix notation indicates this is an intermediate CN star. It is a periodic microvariable with an amplitude of 0.0055 magnitude and a frequency of 0.36118 cycles per day. With the supply of hydrogen exhausted at its core, the star has expanded and cooled, now having 33 times the Sun's girth. It is radiating 355 times the luminosity of the Sun from its swollen photosphere at an effective temperature of 4491 K.

Eta Gruis has a magnitude 11.5 visual companion located at an angular separation of 25.6″ along a position angle of 187°, as of 2012.
