= Gamma Gruis =

Star in the constellation Grus

- Location of γ Gruis (circled) near the center

Observation data Epoch J2000 Equinox ICRS
- Constellation: Grus
- Right ascension: 21^{h} 53^{m} 55.72620^{s}
- Declination: −37° 21′ 53.4790″
- Apparent magnitude (V): 3.003

Characteristics
- Spectral type: B8 III or B8IV-Vs
- U−B color index: −0.307
- B−V color index: −0.121

Astrometry
Radial velocity (R_{v})	−2.1 km/s
Proper motion (μ)	RA: +98.07 mas/yr Dec.: −13.22 mas/yr
Parallax (π)	15.45±0.67 mas
Distance	211 ± 9 ly (65 ± 3 pc)
Absolute magnitude (M_{V})	−1.05

Details
Mass	3.06 M_{☉}
Radius	4.5 R_{☉}
Luminosity	373 L_{☉}
Surface gravity (log g)	3.79 cgs
Temperature	12,520 K
Rotation	4.987 d
Rotational velocity (v sin i)	57 km/s
Age	75 Myr

Other designations
- γ Gru, Gamma Gru, CD−37°9119, FK5 822, GC 30640, HD 207971, HIP 108085, HR 8353, SAO 213374

Database references
SIMBAD	data

Gamma Gruis or γ Gruis, formally named Aldhanab (/ˈældənæb/), is a star in the southern constellation of Grus (it once belonged to the Ptolemaic constellation Piscis Austrinus). With an apparent visual magnitude of 3.0, it is the third-brightest star in Grus. Based upon parallax measurements, this star is located at a distance of roughly 211 light-years (65 parsecs) from the Sun.

== Nomenclature ==
γ Gruis (Latinised to Gamma Gruis) is the system's Bayer designation.

It bore the traditional Arabic name Al Dhanab, from the Arabic الذنب al-dhanab "the tail" (of the Southern Fish)when it was still part of Piscis Austrinus with the Bayer designation κ Piscis Austrini (Kappa Piscis Austrini). In 2016, the IAU organized a Working Group on Star Names (WGSN) to catalog and standardize proper names for stars. The WGSN approved the name Aldhanab for this star on 5 September 2017 and it is now so included in the List of IAU-approved Star Names.

In Chinese, 敗臼 (Bài Jiù), meaning Decayed Mortar, refers to an asterism consisting of Gamma Gruis, Lambda Gruis, Gamma Piscis Austrini and 19 Piscis Austrini. Consequently, the Chinese name for Gamma Gruis itself is 敗臼一 (Bài Jiù yī, English: the First Star of Decayed Mortar.)

== Properties ==
Analysis of the spectrum by N. Houk in 1979 shows it to match a stellar classification of B8 III, with the luminosity class of III indicating this is a giant star that has exhausted the supply of hydrogen at its core and evolved away from the main sequence. R. O. Gray and R. F. Garrison in 1989 found a less evolved class of B8IV-Vs. The luminosity of Gamma Gruis is around 390 times that of the Sun, with a significant portion of the energy emission being in the ultraviolet. Its outer envelope has an effective temperature of 12,520 K, which gives the star a blue-white hue. Gamma Gruis is rotating relatively rapidly with a projected rotational velocity of 57 km s^{−1}. By way of comparison, the Sun has an azimuthal velocity along its equator of just 2 km s^{−1}.

Based upon analysis of data collected during the Hipparcos mission, this star may have a proper motion companion that is causing gravitational perturbation of Gamma Gruis. In addition, there is a star sharing common proper motion and similar distance with Gamma Gruis, and thus is believed to the gravitationally bound. It has a projected separation of 162,100 astronomical units (0.786 pc; 2.563 ly), and a mass and radius around 30% that of the Sun. They likely make a binary system.

== See also ==
- Traditional Chinese star names#Grus
