= Mu2 Gruis =

Star in the constellation Grus

Mu^{2} Gruis
- Location of μ^{2} Gruis (circled in red)

Observation data Epoch J2000.0 Equinox J2000.0 (ICRS)
- Constellation: Grus
- Right ascension: 22^{h} 16^{m} 26.54790^{s}
- Declination: −41° 37′ 37.8266″
- Apparent magnitude (V): 5.10

Characteristics
- Spectral type: G8 III
- B−V color index: +0.92

Astrometry
Radial velocity (R_{v})	+12.50 km/s
Proper motion (μ)	RA: −14.788 mas/yr Dec.: −15.530 mas/yr
Parallax (π)	13.1578±0.1559 mas
Distance	248 ± 3 ly (76.0 ± 0.9 pc)
Absolute magnitude (M_{V})	+0.56

Details
Radius	9.97+0.32 −0.20 R_{☉}
Luminosity	56.37±0.78 L_{☉}
Temperature	5009+52 −79 K

Other designations
- μ^{2} Gru, CD−42°15846, HD 211202, HIP 109973, HR 8488, SAO 231063

Database references
SIMBAD	data

Mu^{2} Gruis, Latinized from μ^{2} Gruis, is a yellow-hued star or star system in the southern constellation of Grus. It is a suspected astrometric binary, showing a variation in proper motion due to gravitational acceleration. Mu^{2} Gruis is visible to the naked eye with an apparent visual magnitude of 5.10. The distance to this system, as determined using an annual parallax shift of 13.2 mas as seen from the Earth, is around 248 light years. It is drifting further away with a heliocentric radial velocity of +12.5 km/s.

The primary component is an evolved giant star with a stellar classification of G8 III. It is a periodic variable star, showing a change in brightness with an amplitude of 0.004 magnitude at the rate of 7.50983 times per day. With the supply of hydrogen at its core exhausted, the star has cooled and expanded until now it has 10 times the radius of the Sun. It is radiating 56 times the luminosity of the Sun from its swollen photosphere at an effective temperature of 5,009 K.
