= Epsilon Gruis =

Star in the constellation Grus

- Location of ε Gruis (circled in red)

Observation data Epoch J2000.0 Equinox J2000.0 (ICRS)
- Constellation: Grus
- Right ascension: 22^{h} 48^{m} 33.29833^{s}
- Declination: −51° 19′ 00.7001″
- Apparent magnitude (V): 3.466

Characteristics
- Spectral type: A2 IVn
- B−V color index: 0.09

Astrometry
Radial velocity (R_{v})	−0.4±2.1 km/s
Proper motion (μ)	RA: +108.43 mas/yr Dec.: −64.83 mas/yr
Parallax (π)	25.30±0.48 mas
Distance	129 ± 2 ly (39.5 ± 0.7 pc)
Absolute magnitude (M_{V})	+0.52

Details
Mass	1.85 M_{☉}
Radius	3.63 R_{☉}
Luminosity	46.3 L_{☉}
Surface gravity (log g)	3.47±0.14 cgs
Temperature	8,685±295 K
Metallicity [Fe/H]	−0.16 dex
Rotation	0.79 days
Rotational velocity (v sin i)	235.1±11.8 km/s
Age	249 Myr

Other designations
- ε Gru, CD−51°13389, FK5 860, GJ 9796, HD 215789, HIP 112623, HR 8675, SAO 247593

Database references
SIMBAD	data

ε Gruis, Latinised as Epsilon Gruis, is a blue-white hued star in the southern constellation of Grus. It is visible to the naked eye, having an apparent visual magnitude of 3.5. Based upon an annual parallax shift of 25.30 mas as measured from Earth, it is located around 129 light years from the Sun. The system may be moving closer to the Sun with a radial velocity of about −0.4 km/s.

This is an A-type subgiant of spectral type A2IVn, a star that has used up its core hydrogen and has begun to expand off the main sequence. At the estimated age of 249 million years, it is spinning rapidly with a projected rotational velocity of 235 km/s. This is giving the star an oblate shape with an equatorial bulge that is an estimated 18% larger than the polar radius. The star displays an infrared excess, suggesting the presence of a circumstellar disk of orbiting dust.

Epsilon Gruis is suspected of having a moderately active close companion, which is most likely the source of the weak X-ray emission from these coordinates with a luminosity of 1.3×10^{28} erg s^{−1}.
