= Delta2 Gruis =

Variable star in the constellation Grus

Delta^{2} Gruis
- Location of δ^{2} Gruis (circled in red)

Observation data Epoch J2000.0 Equinox J2000.0 (ICRS)
- Constellation: Grus
- Right ascension: 22^{h} 29^{m} 45.43402^{s}
- Declination: −43° 44′ 57.1968″
- Apparent magnitude (V): 3.99 - 4.20

Characteristics
- Evolutionary stage: AGB
- Spectral type: M4.5 IIIa
- U−B color index: +1.71
- B−V color index: +1.57
- Variable type: LB?

Astrometry
Radial velocity (R_{v})	+2.7±0.8 km/s
Proper motion (μ)	RA: −14.08 mas/yr Dec.: +2.57 mas/yr
Parallax (π)	9.1556±0.1885 mas
Distance	356 ± 7 ly (109 ± 2 pc)
Absolute magnitude (M_{V})	−0.90±0.05

Details
Radius	97 R_{☉}
Luminosity	1,359 L_{☉}
Surface gravity (log g)	+0.45 cgs
Temperature	3,560 K
Rotational velocity (v sin i)	+4.5±0.8 km/s

Other designations
- δ^{2} Gru, CD−44°14935, HD 213080, HIP 111043, HR 8560, SAO 231161, WDS J22298-4345A

Database references
SIMBAD	data

Delta^{2} Gruis, Latinized from δ^{2} Gruis, is a solitary, red-hued star in the southern constellation of Grus. It is visible to the naked eye with an apparent visual magnitude of about 4. Based upon an annual parallax shift of 9.88 mas as seen from the Earth, the star is located around 330 light years from the Sun. It is moving further away from the Sun with a radial velocity of +3 km/s.

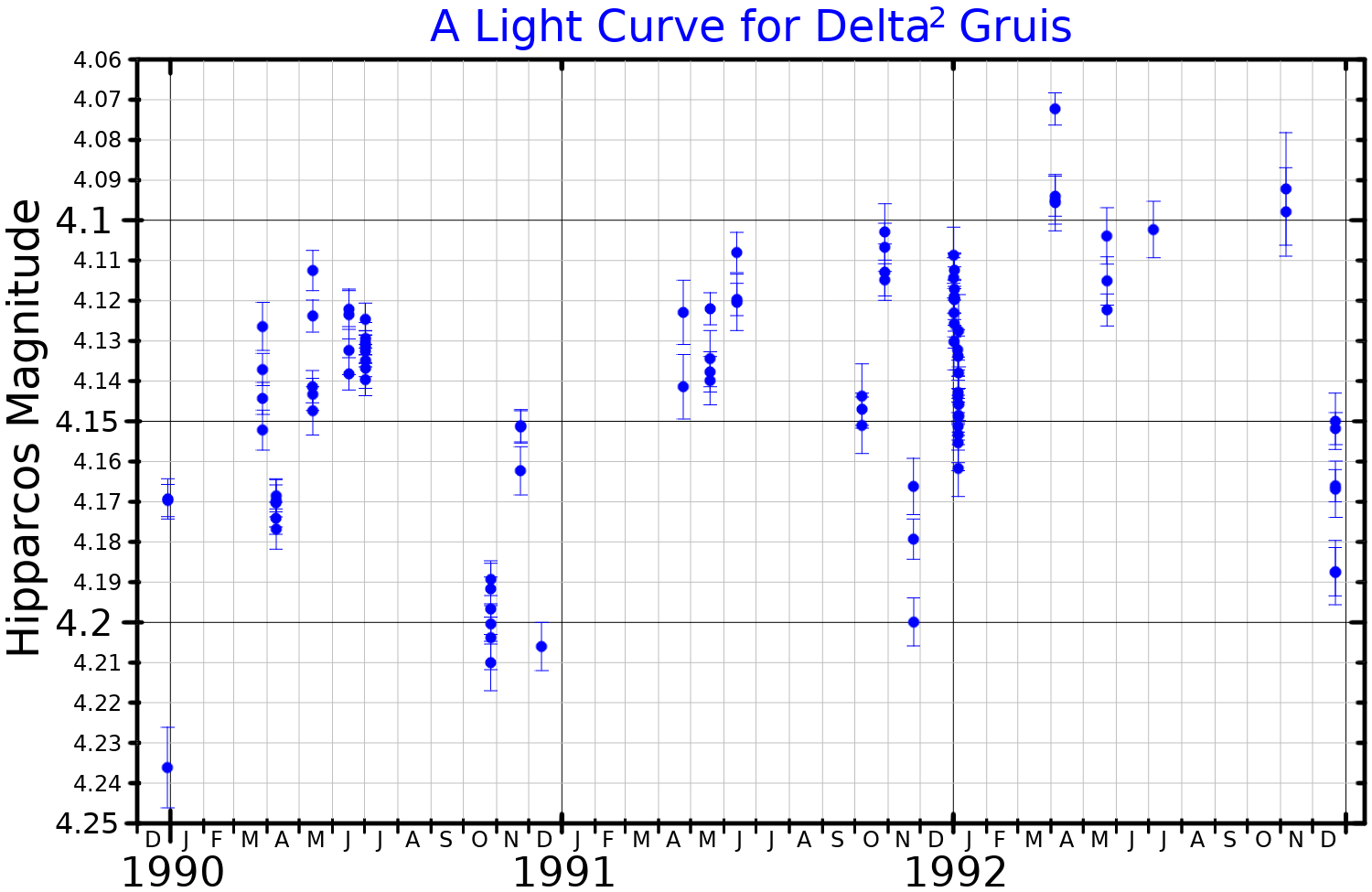
A light curve for Delta^{2} Gruis, plotted from Hipparcos data

This is an evolved red giant star with a stellar classification of M4.5 IIIa. It is a pulsating variable with multiple periods, including 20.6, 24.1, 24.5, and 32.3 days. The strongest period is 33.3 days with an amplitude of 0.043 magnitude. It has a magnitude 9.71 visual companion at an angular separation of 60.4 arc seconds along a position angle of 210°, as of 2013.
