= Mu1 Gruis =

Star in the constellation Grus

Mu^{1} Gruis
- Location of μ^{1} Gruis (circled in red)

Observation data Epoch J2000.0 Equinox J2000.0 (ICRS)
- Constellation: Grus
- Right ascension: 22^{h} 15^{m} 36.93338^{s}
- Declination: −41° 20′ 48.3558″
- Apparent magnitude (V): 4.79 (5.20 + 6.68)

Characteristics
- Spectral type: G8 III + G
- U−B color index: +0.47
- B−V color index: +0.80

Astrometry
Radial velocity (R_{v})	−4.82±1.54 km/s
Proper motion (μ)	RA: +30.774 mas/yr Dec.: +42.645 mas/yr
Parallax (π)	13.5115±0.2846 mas
Distance	241 ± 5 ly (74 ± 2 pc)
Absolute magnitude (M_{V})	+0.17

Orbit
Period (P)	19.04+0.16 −0.18 yr
Semi-major axis (a)	0.168+0.003 −0.002″
Eccentricity (e)	0.561+0.025 −0.020
Inclination (i)	65.69+0.44 −0.53°
Longitude of the node (Ω)	104.2+1.6 −1.8°
Periastron epoch (T)	1996.35+0.17 −0.18
Argument of periastron (ω) (secondary)	92.61+0.67 −0.54°

Details

A
Radius	9.3+1.4 −1.3 R_{☉}
Luminosity	66.9+1.8 −1.6 L_{☉}
Temperature	5,422+423 −377 K

Other designations
- μ^{1} Gru, CD−41°14810, FK5 3777, HD 211088, HIP 109908, HR 8486, SAO 231055, WDS J22156-4121

Database references
SIMBAD	data

Mu^{1} Gruis, Latinized from μ^{1} Gruis, is a binary star system in the southern constellation of Grus. It is visible to the naked eye with a combined apparent visual magnitude of 4.79. The distance to this system, as determined using an annual parallax shift of 11.44 mas as seen from the Earth, is around 275 light years. It is drifting closer with a heliocentric radial velocity of −5 km/s.

The pair orbit each other with a period of 19 years and an eccentricity of 0.56. The yellow-hued primary component is an evolved giant star with stellar classification of G III and visual magnitude 5.20. With the supply of hydrogen at its core exhausted, it cooled and expanded; at present it has nine times the girth of the Sun. The star is radiating 67 times the luminosity of the Sun from its enlarged photosphere at an effective temperature of 5,422 K.

The secondary component is magnitude 6.68 and classed as a G-type star, although its color index and absolute magnitude suggest it is of type A6.
