= Theta Gruis =

Star in the constellation Grus

- Location of θ Gruis (circled in red)

Observation data Epoch J2000.0 Equinox J2000.0 (ICRS)
- Constellation: Grus
- Right ascension: 23^{h} 06^{m} 52.73046^{s}
- Declination: −43° 31′ 13.2857″
- Apparent magnitude (V): 4.28 (4.51 + 6.84 + 7.80)

Characteristics
- Spectral type: kF3VhF5mF5(II-III) + ? + G2V
- U−B color index: +0.16
- B−V color index: +0.42

Astrometry
Radial velocity (R_{v})	+9.6 km/s
Proper motion (μ)	RA: −47.17 mas/yr Dec.: −13.49 mas/yr
Parallax (π)	24.73±0.45 mas
Distance	132 ± 2 ly (40.4 ± 0.7 pc)
Absolute magnitude (M_{V})	+1.25

Details

θ Gru A
Luminosity	27 L_{☉}
Rotational velocity (v sin i)	64 km/s

Other designations
- θ Gru, CD−44°15149, HD 218227, HIP 114131, HR 8787, SAO 231444

Database references
SIMBAD	data

Theta Gruis, Latinized from θ Gruis, is a triple star system in the southern constellation of Grus. Its combined apparent visual magnitude is 4.28, which is bright enough to be seen with the naked eye. The system contains a magnetic Delta Delphini-like F5 star with a close fainter companion, plus a more distant G2 main sequence star.
