= Lambda Gruis =

Star in the constellation Grus

- Location of λ Gruis (circled in red)

Observation data Epoch J2000.0 Equinox J2000.0 (ICRS)
- Constellation: Grus
- Right ascension: 22^{h} 06^{m} 06.88568^{s}
- Declination: −39° 32′ 36.0659″
- Apparent magnitude (V): 4.47

Characteristics
- Evolutionary stage: giant
- Spectral type: K3 III
- U−B color index: +1.628
- B−V color index: +1.369

Astrometry
| Radial velocity (R_{v}) | +38.80 km/s |
| Proper motion (μ) | RA: −23.80 mas/yr Dec.: −124.58 mas/yr |
| Parallax (π) | 13.47±0.22 mas |
| Distance | 242 ± 4 ly (74 ± 1 pc) |
| Absolute magnitude (M_{V}) | +0.12 |

Details
| Mass | 2.4 M_{☉} |
| Radius | 22.3 R_{☉} |
| Luminosity | 155 L_{☉} |
| Surface gravity (log g) | 2.13 cgs |
| Temperature | 4,269 K |

Other designations
- λ Gru, CD−40°14639, FK5 1581, HD 209688, HIP 109111, HR 8411, SAO 213543

Database references
| SIMBAD | data |

Lambda Gruis, Latinized from λ Gruis, is a solitary, orange-hued star in the southern constellation of Grus. With an apparent visual magnitude of 4.47, it is visible to the naked eye as a faint point of light. The distance to this star, as determined using an annual parallax shift of 13.47 mas as seen from the Earth, is around 242 light years. It is drifting further away with a radial velocity of +39 km/s, having come to within 183 light-years some 805,000 years ago.

This is an evolved K-type giant star with a stellar classification of K3 III, having exhausted the supply of hydrogen at its core then cooled and expanded off the main sequence. It has about 2.4 times the mass of the Sun and has expanded to 22.3 times the Sun's radius. The star is radiating 155 times the Sun's luminosity from its photosphere at an effective temperature of 4,269 K.
