= List of stars in Aquarius =

This is the list of notable stars in the constellation Aquarius, sorted by decreasing brightness.

Name	B	F	G.	Var	HD	HIP	RA	Dec	vis. mag.	abs. mag.	Dist. (ly)	Sp. class	Notes
β Aqr	β	22	75		204867	106278	21^{h} 31^{m} 33.52^{s}	−05° 34′ 16.2″	2.90	−3.47	612	G0Ib	Sadalsuud, Sadalsud, Sad es Saud, Sadalsund, Saad el Sund, Nir Saad al Saaoud, Lucida Fortunæ Fortunarum, part of Saʽd al Suʽud; triple star
α Aqr	α	34	105		209750	109074	22^{h} 05^{m} 47.03^{s}	−00° 19′ 11.4″	2.95	−3.88	758	G2Ib	Sadalmelik, Sadal Melik, Sadalmelek, Sadlamulk, El Melik, Saad el Melik, Ruchbah; double star
δ Aqr	δ	76	191		216627	113136	22^{h} 54^{m} 39.04^{s}	−15° 49′ 14.7″	3.27	−0.18	159	A3V	Skat, Scheat, Seat, Sheat
ζ^{1} Aqr	ζ^{1}	55	150		213051	110960	22^{h} 28^{m} 49.80^{s}	−00° 01′ 12.2″	3.65	1.14	103	F3III-IV	Sadaltager, Sadaltajir, Altager, Achr al Achbiya, Postrema Tabernaculorum, part of al Aḣbiyah; binary star
88 Aqr	c^{2}	88	211		218594	114341	23^{h} 09^{m} 26.76^{s}	−21° 10′ 20.9″	3.68	−0.60	234	K1III	Safina
λ Aqr	λ	73	185		216386	112961	22^{h} 52^{m} 36.86^{s}	−07° 34′ 46.8″	3.73	−1.67	391	M2IIIvar	Shatabhisha, Ekkhysis; irregular variable, V_{max} = 3.57^{m}, V_{min} = 3.80^{m}
ε Aqr	ε	2	8		198001	102618	20^{h} 47^{m} 40.53^{s}	−09° 29′ 44.5″	3.78	−0.46	229	A1V	Albali, Al Bali, Nir Saad Bula, Lucida Fortunæ Dissipantis, part of al Bulaʽ; suspected variable
γ Aqr	γ	48	136		212061	110395	22^{h} 21^{m} 39.30^{s}	−01° 23′ 14.5″	3.86	0.44	158	A0V	Sadachbia, Sadalachbia, Aoul al Achbiya, Prima Tabernaculorum, part of al Aḣbiyah; double star
98 Aqr	b^{1}	98	231		220321	115438	23^{h} 22^{m} 58.30^{s}	−20° 06′ 01.2″	3.96	0.48	162	K0III	
η Aqr	η	62	163		213998	111497	22^{h} 35^{m} 21.33^{s}	−00° 07′ 02.5″	4.04	0.29	183	B9IV-Vn	Fenmu, part of al Aḣbiyah
τ^{2} Aqr	τ^{2}	71	183		216032	112716	22^{h} 49^{m} 35.51^{s}	−13° 35′ 33.1″	4.05	−1.28	380	K5III	Lintangkumba optical double; suspected variable
θ Aqr	θ	43	129		211391	110003	22^{h} 16^{m} 49.97^{s}	−07° 46′ 59.7″	4.17	0.33	191	G8III-IV	Ancha
φ Aqr	φ	90	215		219215	114724	23^{h} 14^{m} 19.33^{s}	−06° 02′ 54.7″	4.22	0.05	222	M2III	suspected variable
ψ^{1} Aqr	ψ^{1}	91	218		219449	114855	23^{h} 15^{m} 53.28^{s}	−09° 05′ 15.7″	4.24	0.95	148	K0III	multiple star; has a planet (b)
ι Aqr	ι	33	107		209819	109139	22^{h} 06^{m} 26.21^{s}	−13° 52′ 10.3″	4.29	0.67	172	B8V	
99 Aqr	b^{2}	99	235		220704	115669	23^{h} 26^{m} 02.82^{s}	−20° 38′ 30.7″	4.38	−0.50	308	K4III	suspected variable
ψ^{2} Aqr	ψ^{2}	93	222		219688	115033	23^{h} 17^{m} 54.20^{s}	−09° 10′ 57.0″	4.41	−0.56	322	B5Vn	Be star; variable, ΔV = 0.06^{m}, P = 1.073 d
ζ^{2} Aqr	ζ^{2}	55	150		213052		22^{h} 28^{m} 50.10^{s}	−00° 01′ 12.0″	4.42	-0.01	251	F3V	component of the ζ Aqr system
3 Aqr	k	3	9	EN	198026	102624	20^{h} 47^{m} 44.24^{s}	−05° 01′ 39.4″	4.43	−1.24	445	M3IIIvar	EN Aqr; irregular variable, ΔV = 0.06^{m}
86 Aqr	c^{1}	86	210		218240	114119	23^{h} 06^{m} 40.81^{s}	−23° 44′ 35.2″	4.48	0.67	188	G8III	binary star
ω^{2} Aqr	ω^{2}	105	259		222661	116971	23^{h} 42^{m} 43.28^{s}	−14° 32′ 41.1″	4.49	1.12	154	B9V	binary star
ν Aqr	ν	13	47		201381	104459	21^{h} 09^{m} 35.59^{s}	−11° 22′ 18.0″	4.50	1.00	164	G8III	Albulaan, part of al Bulaʽ
ξ Aqr	ξ	23	81		205767	106786	21^{h} 37^{m} 45.04^{s}	−07° 51′ 14.9″	4.68	0.99	179	A7V	Bunda, Thanih Saad al Saaoud, Secunda Fortunæ Fortunarum, part of Saʽd al Suʽud; double star
66 Aqr	g	66	176		215167	112211	22^{h} 43^{m} 35.25^{s}	−18° 49′ 49.1″	4.68	−1.18	484	K3III	suspected variable
101 Aqr	b^{3}	101	244		221565	116247	23^{h} 33^{m} 16.63^{s}	−20° 54′ 52.3″	4.70	−0.26	320	A0V	double star
89 Aqr	c^{3}	89	212		218640	114375	23^{h} 09^{m} 54.88^{s}	−22° 27′ 27.3″	4.71	−1.31	521	A3IV:	double star
μ Aqr	μ	6	16		198743	103045	20^{h} 52^{m} 39.21^{s}	−08° 58′ 59.7″	4.73	1.34	155	A3m	Albulaan, part of al Bulaʽ; double star, spectroscopic binary
ο Aqr	ο	31	103		209409	108874	22^{h} 03^{m} 18.83^{s}	−02° 09′ 19.2″	4.74	−0.60	381	B7IVe	Kae Uh; emission-line star; γ Cas variable, V_{max} = 4.68^{m}, V_{min} = 4.89^{m}
π Aqr	π	52	142		212571	110672	22^{h} 25^{m} 16.61^{s}	+01° 22′ 38.6″	4.80	−2.84	1101	B1Ve	Seat, Wasat al Achbiya, Media Tabernaculorum, part of al Aḣbiyah; emission-line star; γ Cas variable, V_{max} = 4.42^{m}, V_{min} = 4.87^{m}
σ Aqr	σ	57	154		213320	111123	22^{h} 30^{m} 38.82^{s}	−10° 40′ 40.4″	4.82	0.27	265	A0IVs	貴子星 (Takako-boshi)
104 Aqr A	A^{2}	104	257		222574	116901	23^{h} 41^{m} 45.80^{s}	−17° 48′ 59.5″	4.82	−1.65	643	G2Ib/II	triple star; suspected variable
χ Aqr	χ	92	219		219576	114939	23^{h} 16^{m} 50.95^{s}	−07° 43′ 35.3″	4.93	−1.54	640	M3III	semiregular variable, V_{max} = 4.75^{m}, V_{min} = 5.10^{m}, P = 35.25 d
ω^{1} Aqr	ω^{1}	102	253		222345	116758	23^{h} 39^{m} 47.04^{s}	−14° 13′ 19.4″	4.97	1.91	134	A7IV	
ψ^{3} Aqr	ψ^{3}	95	223		219832	115115	23^{h} 18^{m} 57.65^{s}	−09° 36′ 38.6″	4.99	0.58	249	A0V	triple star
κ Aqr	κ	63	166		214376	111710	22^{h} 37^{m} 45.42^{s}	−04° 13′ 39.9″	5.04	0.76	234	K2III	Situla; double star
25 Aqr	d	25	84		206067	106944	21^{h} 39^{m} 33.28^{s}	+02° 14′ 37.5″	5.10	0.76	241	K0III	double star
47 Aqr		47	135		212010	110391	22^{h} 21^{m} 35.58^{s}	−21° 35′ 52.9″	5.12	1.37	183	K0III	
1 Aqr		1	3		196758	101936	20^{h} 39^{m} 24.83^{s}	+00° 29′ 11.4″	5.15	0.77	245	K1III	triple star
108 Aqr	i^{3}	108	270	ET	223640	117629	23^{h} 51^{m} 21.32^{s}	−18° 54′ 33.0″	5.17	0.20	321	Ap Si	ET Aqr; spectroscopic binary; α^{2} CVn variable, V_{max} = 5.12^{m}, V_{min} = 5.21^{m}, P = 3.73524 d
94 Aqr B		94	224			115125	23^{h} 19^{m} 06.37^{s}	−13° 27′ 17.0″	5.19	3.56	69	K2V	component of the 94 Aqr system
97 Aqr		97	230		220278	115404	23^{h} 22^{m} 39.10^{s}	−15° 02′ 21.8″	5.19	0.88	237	A3V	binary star
94 Aqr A		94	224		219834	115126	23^{h} 19^{m} 06.51^{s}	−13° 27′ 30.4″	5.20	3.62	69	G6/G8IV	binary star
υ Aqr	υ	59	161		213845	111449	22^{h} 34^{m} 41.50^{s}	−20° 42′ 28.3″	5.21	3.43	74	F7V	
68 Aqr		68	179		215721	112529	22^{h} 47^{m} 33.19^{s}	−19° 36′ 46.3″	5.24	0.68	266	G8III	
106 Aqr	i^{1}	106	261		222847	117089	23^{h} 44^{m} 12.06^{s}	−18° 16′ 36.9″	5.24	0.20	331	B9V	
258 G. Aqr			258		222643	116957	23^{h} 42^{m} 27.81^{s}	−15° 26′ 52.7″	5.27	0.60	280	K3III	
107 Aqr	i^{2}	107	262		223024	117218	23^{h} 46^{m} 00.84^{s}	−18° 40′ 42.1″	5.28	1.21	212	F0III	double star
32 Aqr		32	104		209625	108991	22^{h} 04^{m} 47.43^{s}	−00° 54′ 22.5″	5.29	1.04	231	A5m	
41 Aqr		41	123		210960	109786	22^{h} 14^{m} 18.02^{s}	−21° 04′ 28.9″	5.33	0.65	281	K1III	multiple star
42 Aqr		42	127		211361	110000	22^{h} 16^{m} 48.04^{s}	−12° 49′ 53.2″	5.34	−0.52	484	K1III	
ρ Aqr	ρ	46	134		211838	110273	22^{h} 20^{m} 11.91^{s}	−07° 49′ 16.0″	5.35	−1.44	743	B8IIIMNp...	
103 Aqr	A^{1}	103	256		222547	116889	23^{h} 41^{m} 34.51^{s}	−18° 01′ 36.8″	5.36	−0.91	584	K4/K5III	
38 Aqr	e	38	117		210424	109472	22^{h} 10^{m} 37.46^{s}	−11° 33′ 53.9″	5.43	−0.75	561	B5III	
83 Aqr	h	83	208		218060	113996	23^{h} 05^{m} 09.71^{s}	−07° 41′ 37.7″	5.44	1.63	188	F2V	triple star
18 Aqr		18	67		203705	105668	21^{h} 24^{m} 11.44^{s}	−12° 52′ 41.3″	5.48	2.07	157	F0V	suspected variable
21 Aqr		21	70		203926	105767	21^{h} 25^{m} 16.96^{s}	−03° 33′ 23.7″	5.48	−0.01	408	K4III	
7 Aqr		7	24		199345	103401	20^{h} 56^{m} 54.03^{s}	−09° 41′ 51.1″	5.49	−0.84	601	K5III	triple star; suspected variable
12 Aqr B		12	37		200496	103981	21^{h} 04^{m} 04.58^{s}	−05° 49′ 24.2″	7.31			A3V	optical double
49 Aqr		49	137		212271	110529	22^{h} 23^{m} 30.79^{s}	−24° 45′ 45.6″	5.53	0.93	272	K0IIICN...	
77 Aqr		77	193		216640	113148	22^{h} 54^{m} 45.60^{s}	−16° 16′ 18.3″	5.53	2.36	140	K1III	suspected variable
5 Aqr		5	13		198667	103005	20^{h} 52^{m} 08.69^{s}	−05° 30′ 25.4″	5.55	−1.27	753	B9III	suspected variable
30 Aqr		30	102		209396	108868	22^{h} 03^{m} 16.43^{s}	−06° 31′ 20.7″	5.55	0.95	271	K0III	
53 Aqr B	f	53	146		212697	110778	22^{h} 26^{m} 34.15^{s}	−16° 44′ 31.7″	5.55	4.04	65	G3V	multiple star
217 G. Aqr			217		219402	114822	23^{h} 15^{m} 34.26^{s}	−03° 29′ 46.9″	5.56	1.30	231	A3V	
96 Aqr		96	226		219877	115142	23^{h} 19^{m} 23.86^{s}	−05° 07′ 27.5″	5.56	2.85	114	F3IV	
28 Aqr		28	99		209128	108691	22^{h} 01^{m} 05.01^{s}	+00° 36′ 17.1″	5.60	−0.94	661	K4III:	
26 Aqr		26	85		206445	107144	21^{h} 42^{m} 10.12^{s}	+01° 17′ 07.0″	5.66	−2.77	1583	K2III	
HD 222093			250		222093	116591	23^{h} 37^{m} 39.54^{s}	−13° 03′ 37.1″	5.66	0.96	283	K0III	double star
τ^{1} Aqr	τ^{1}	69	180		215766	112542	22^{h} 47^{m} 42.75^{s}	−14° 03′ 23.1″	5.68	1.17	260	B9V	multiple star
269 G. Aqr			269		223559	117567	23^{h} 50^{m} 33.26^{s}	−14° 24′ 05.2″	5.70	−0.05	460	K4III	
19 Aqr		19	68		203875	105761	21^{h} 25^{m} 13.02^{s}	−09° 44′ 53.3″	5.71	1.07	276	F0IV	
94 G. Aqr			94		208111	108102	21^{h} 54^{m} 10.34^{s}	−04° 16′ 33.4″	5.71	0.96	291	K2III	
HD 216718			195		216718	113184	22^{h} 55^{m} 10.94^{s}	−04° 59′ 16.4″	5.72	0.95	293	K0III-IV	double star
264 G. Aqr			264		223170	117314	23^{h} 47^{m} 15.94^{s}	−11° 54′ 39.2″	5.74	0.61	346	K0III	
44 Aqr		44	131		211434	110023	22^{h} 17^{m} 06.50^{s}	−05° 23′ 14.0″	5.75	0.65	341	G6III	suspected variable
50 Aqr		50	140		212430	110602	22^{h} 24^{m} 27.03^{s}	−13° 31′ 45.9″	5.76	−0.35	542	K0III	
HD 223807	h		273		223807	117756	23^{h} 52^{m} 50.49^{s}	−08° 59′ 48.1″	5.76	−0.61	612	K0III	
80 G. Aqr			80		205423	106592	21^{h} 35^{m} 17.63^{s}	−03° 58′ 59.9″	5.79	0.13	441	G9III:	
51 Aqr		51	139		212404	110578	22^{h} 24^{m} 06.87^{s}	−04° 50′ 13.2″	5.79	0.22	424	A0V	multiple star
35 Aqr		35	112		210191	109332	22^{h} 08^{m} 58.99^{s}	−18° 31′ 10.5″	5.80	−5.79	6792	B2III	
HD 211392			130		211392	110009	22^{h} 16^{m} 52.60^{s}	−09° 02′ 24.1″	5.80	0.64	351	K3III:	suspected variable
74 Aqr		74	187	HI	216494	113031	22^{h} 53^{m} 28.69^{s}	−11° 36′ 59.5″	5.80	−0.72	657	B8IV/V	HI Aqr; double star; α^{2} CVn variable, ΔV = 0.01^{m}, P = 3.4 d
15 Aqr		15	58		202753	105164	21^{h} 18^{m} 11.07^{s}	−04° 31′ 10.2″	5.83	−1.56	979	B5V	
271 G. Aqr			271		223774	117722	23^{h} 52^{m} 30.05^{s}	−14° 15′ 04.3″	5.85	1.13	286	K2III	
11 G. Aqr			11		198431	102891	20^{h} 50^{m} 41.70^{s}	−12° 32′ 41.0″	5.87	1.45	250	K1III	
16 Aqr		16	62		203222	105412	21^{h} 21^{m} 04.33^{s}	−04° 33′ 36.5″	5.87	0.80	336	G7III:	
60 Aqr		60	160		213789	111394	22^{h} 34^{m} 02.89^{s}	−01° 34′ 27.0″	5.88	0.21	444	G6III	triple star
12 Aqr A		12			200497		21^{h} 04^{m} 04.74^{s}	−05° 49′ 23.08″	5.89	-0.21	541	G4III	optical component of 12 Aqr
255 G. Aqr			255		222493	116853	23^{h} 41^{m} 08.87^{s}	−11° 40′ 50.4″	5.89	0.56	379	K0III	
138 G. Aqr			138		212320	110532	22^{h} 23^{m} 32.15^{s}	−07° 11′ 40.0″	5.92	0.18	466	G8Ib/II(w)	
268 G. Aqr			268		223524	117541	23^{h} 50^{m} 14.65^{s}	−09° 58′ 27.6″	5.93	1.06	307	K0IV	
202 G. Aqr			202		217563	113686	23^{h} 01^{m} 31.70^{s}	−04° 42′ 41.3″	5.94	−3.61	1011	G5II/III	
DV Aqr			27	DV	199603	103545	20^{h} 58^{m} 41.87^{s}	−14° 28′ 59.1″	5.95	1.31	276	A9V	β Lyr variable, V_{max} = 5.89^{m}, V_{min} = 6.25^{m}, P = 1.57553 d
246 G. Aqr			246		221745	116368	23^{h} 34^{m} 49.33^{s}	−15° 14′ 44.9″	5.95	0.79	351	K4III	
45 Aqr		45	133		211676	110179	22^{h} 19^{m} 00.70^{s}	−13° 18′ 17.9″	5.96	0.78	354	K0III	
225 G. Aqr			225		219879	115144	23^{h} 19^{m} 24.11^{s}	−18° 04′ 31.4″	5.96	−1.71	1116	K2/K3III	
162 G. Aqr			162		213986	111515	22^{h} 35^{m} 36.36^{s}	−23° 59′ 27.9″	5.97	0.89	337	K1III	
205 G. Aqr			205		217703	113801	23^{h} 02^{m} 44.29^{s}	−20° 52′ 13.4″	5.97	1.54	251	K0III	
HD 210434			118		210434	109466	22^{h} 10^{m} 33.70^{s}	−04° 16′ 00.7″	5.98	1.30	282	K0III-IV	double star
4 Aqr		4	12		198571	102945	20^{h} 51^{m} 25.69^{s}	−05° 37′ 35.9″	5.99	2.14	192	F5IV-V	multiple star; suspected variable
17 Aqr		17	65		203525	105574	21^{h} 22^{m} 56.27^{s}	−09° 19′ 09.4″	5.99	−0.73	720	M0III	
39 Aqr		39	120		210705	109624	22^{h} 12^{m} 25.74^{s}	−14° 11′ 37.8″	6.04	2.85	142	F0V	binary star; suspected variable
HD 199442			26		199442	103414	20^{h} 57^{m} 10.57^{s}	+00° 27′ 50.2″	6.06	1.11	318	K2III	triple star
HD 223311			265		223311	117420	23^{h} 48^{m} 32.48^{s}	−06° 22′ 49.4″	6.09	−0.64	723	K4III	suspected variable
119 G. Aqr			119		210464	109509	22^{h} 11^{m} 02.30^{s}	−21° 13′ 57.7″	6.10	2.33	185	F6/F7V	
74 G. Aqr			74		204121	105864	21^{h} 26^{m} 27.99^{s}	+01° 06′ 13.5″	6.12	2.72	156	F5V	
198 G. Aqr			198		217251	113531	22^{h} 59^{m} 35.68^{s}	−13° 04′ 15.2″	6.12	−0.40	656	K3/K4III	
HD 219279			216		219279	114750	23^{h} 14^{m} 40.18^{s}	−10° 41′ 19.1″	6.13	−0.91	836	K5III	multiple star
HD 213429			157		213429	111170	22^{h} 31^{m} 18.22^{s}	−06° 33′ 17.6″	6.15	4.12	83	F7V	double star
155 G. Aqr			155		213428	111171	22^{h} 31^{m} 18.42^{s}	−02° 54′ 40.3″	6.15	0.34	473	K0	
HD 218061			207		218061	113998	23^{h} 05^{m} 12.88^{s}	−17° 04′ 44.9″	6.15	0.01	552	K4III	double star
128 G. Aqr			128		211356	109984	22^{h} 16^{m} 33.67^{s}	−01° 35′ 46.9″	6.16	1.63	262	A5Vn	
89 G. Aqr			89		207235	107596	21^{h} 47^{m} 38.20^{s}	−05° 55′ 00.6″	6.17	1.70	256	A7V	
126 G. Aqr			126		211364	110018	22^{h} 16^{m} 59.79^{s}	−23° 08′ 24.4″	6.17	0.16	519	K0III	
HD 220035			228		220035	115257	23^{h} 20^{m} 40.95^{s}	−05° 54′ 28.2″	6.17	0.72	400	K0III	suspected variable
82 Aqr		82	204		217701	113781	23^{h} 02^{m} 32.56^{s}	−06° 34′ 26.1″	6.18	−1.72	1240	M2III	suspected variable
234 G. Aqr			234		220465	115528	23^{h} 24^{m} 07.76^{s}	−18° 41′ 17.2″	6.18	0.92	367	K0III	
70 Aqr		70	181	FM	215874	112615	22^{h} 48^{m} 30.19^{s}	−10° 33′ 19.8″	6.19	0.87	377	A9III-IV	FM Aqr; low-amplitude δ Sct variable, V_{max} = 6.16^{m}, V_{min} = 6.19^{m}, P = 0.087 d
78 Aqr		78	192		216637	113127	22^{h} 54^{m} 34.13^{s}	−07° 12′ 16.3″	6.20	−0.16	609	K3III	
238 G. Aqr			238		221081	115906	23^{h} 29^{m} 00.69^{s}	−09° 15′ 57.7″	6.20	−2.95	2203	K0	
11 Aqr		11	31		199960	103682	21^{h} 00^{m} 33.81^{s}	−04° 43′ 47.7″	6.21	4.10	86	G1V	
266 G. Aqr			266		223428	117494	23^{h} 49^{m} 31.58^{s}	−15° 51′ 40.3″	6.21	0.64	424	K1/K2III	
HD 205765			82		205765	106758	21^{h} 37^{m} 33.77^{s}	−00° 23′ 25.8″	6.22	0.78	399	A2V	binary star
2 G. Aqr			2		196712	101921	20^{h} 39^{m} 13.25^{s}	−02° 24′ 46.7″	6.23	−1.65	1230	B7IIIn	
HD 214448			167		214448	111761	22^{h} 38^{m} 22.10^{s}	−07° 53′ 51.2″	6.23	0.49	459	G1IV-V	double star
81 Aqr		81	201		217531	113674	23^{h} 01^{m} 23.65^{s}	−07° 03′ 40.1″	6.23	0.69	418	K5III	
274 G. Aqr			274		223884	117797	23^{h} 53^{m} 20.81^{s}	−24° 13′ 45.2″	6.23	1.41	300	A5V	
HD 198272				IQ	198272	102770	20^{h} 49^{m} 17.25^{s}	−00° 33′ 47.8″	6.24	−1.06	942	M3	
HD 200375			35		200375	103892	21^{h} 03^{m} 03.09^{s}	+01° 31′ 55.9″	6.24	2.14	215	F5V	triple star
HD 208177			95		208177	108144	21^{h} 54^{m} 35.90^{s}	−03° 18′ 04.3″	6.24	2.02	227	F5IV	double star
98 G. Aqr			98		208801	108506	21^{h} 58^{m} 54.99^{s}	−04° 22′ 21.0″	6.24	3.46	117	K2V	
100 Aqr		100	242		221357	116118	23^{h} 31^{m} 42.04^{s}	−21° 22′ 10.0″	6.24	1.72	261	F0V	
HD 221148			239		221148	115953	23^{h} 29^{m} 31.98^{s}	−04° 31′ 55.9″	6.26	2.81	159	K3IIIvar	suspected variable
49 G. Aqr			49		201567	104557	21^{h} 10^{m} 46.87^{s}	−09° 21′ 14.2″	6.27	1.14	346	K0III	
200 G. Aqr			200		217498	113673	23^{h} 01^{m} 23.03^{s}	−22° 47′ 27.0″	6.27	1.26	327	A2V	
7 G. Aqr			7		197954	102561	20^{h} 47^{m} 03.57^{s}	−02° 29′ 12.7″	6.28	−0.63	787	K2	
100 G. Aqr			100		209240	108784	22^{h} 02^{m} 11.78^{s}	−17° 54′ 12.0″	6.28	1.64	277	K0III	
115 G. Aqr			115		210419	109442	22^{h} 10^{m} 21.10^{s}	−03° 53′ 38.3″	6.28	1.05	362	A1Vnn	
LP Aqr			172	LP	214983	112078	22^{h} 42^{m} 05.99^{s}	−05° 06′ 06.6″	6.28	−1.78	1336	M0	multiple star; irregular variable, ΔV = ~0.34^{m}
144 G. Aqr			144		212643	110746	22^{h} 26^{m} 10.70^{s}	−23° 40′ 56.8″	6.29	0.38	495	A0V	
197 G. Aqr			197		216953	113345	22^{h} 57^{m} 17.21^{s}	−04° 48′ 36.3″	6.31	0.80	413	G9III	
HD 214810			171		214810	111965	22^{h} 40^{m} 47.96^{s}	−03° 33′ 14.9″	6.32	3.70	109	F6V	binary star
96 G. Aqr			96		208703	108453	21^{h} 58^{m} 13.28^{s}	−05° 25′ 28.8″	6.33	2.60	181	F5IV	
HD 219659			221		219659	115015	23^{h} 17^{m} 40.06^{s}	−11° 42′ 46.6″	6.33	0.94	389	A1/A2IV/V	suspected variable
38 G. Aqr			38		200663	104048	21^{h} 04^{m} 45.32^{s}	+02° 16′ 11.8″	6.34	0.96	388	G5	
53 Aqr A	f	53			212698		22^{h} 26^{m} 34.40^{s}	−16° 44′ 33.0″	6.35				component of the 53 Aqr system
113 G. Aqr			113		210244	109375	22^{h} 09^{m} 28.94^{s}	−23° 39′ 32.8″	6.36	0.37	514	G8III	
56 Aqr		56	153		213236	111086	22^{h} 30^{m} 17.33^{s}	−14° 35′ 08.3″	6.36	−0.08	633	B8II	
196 G. Aqr			196		216727	113204	22^{h} 55^{m} 30.57^{s}	−20° 08′ 21.7″	6.36	−0.28	695	K4/K5III	
R Aqr				R	222800	117054	23^{h} 43^{m} 49.50^{s}	−15° 17′ 04.0″	6.36	-0.11	643	M7IIIpev	Mira variable, V_{max} = 5.2^{m}, V_{min} = 12.4^{m}, P = 390 d
189 G. Aqr			189		216553	113080	22^{h} 54^{m} 05.60^{s}	−19° 10′ 30.5″	6.37	0.53	481	K5III	
237 G. Aqr			237		220957	115839	23^{h} 28^{m} 05.14^{s}	−11° 26′ 58.9″	6.37	1.10	369	G6/G8III	
15 G. Aqr			15		198802	103077	20^{h} 53^{m} 05.57^{s}	−11° 34′ 25.5″	6.38	3.11	147	G1V	
HD 202259			52		202259	104872	21^{h} 14^{m} 37.03^{s}	+00° 05′ 32.2″	6.38	−0.23	685	M1III	suspected variable
20 Aqr		20	69		203843	105729	21^{h} 24^{m} 51.68^{s}	−03° 23′ 53.6″	6.38	2.37	213	F0V	
251 G. Aqr			251		222125	116624	23^{h} 38^{m} 02.98^{s}	−15° 05′ 41.4″	6.38	1.30	338	K0III	
29 Aqr		29	101	DX	209278	108797	22^{h} 02^{m} 26.25^{s}	−16° 57′ 53.4″	6.39	0.59	471	A0/1V + K1/2	DX Aqr; triple star, spectroscopic binary; Algol variable, V_{max} = 6.37^{m}, V_{min} = 6.78^{m}, P = 0.945013 d
121 G. Aqr			121		210763	109647	22^{h} 12^{m} 43.89^{s}	−04° 43′ 14.1″	6.39	1.53	305	F7V	
HD 211575			132		211575	110091	22^{h} 18^{m} 04.30^{s}	−00° 14′ 15.1″	6.39	3.30	135	F3V	
58 Aqr		58	156		213464	111200	22^{h} 31^{m} 41.28^{s}	−10° 54′ 19.7″	6.39	2.20	225	A8III	
61 Aqr		61	164		214028	111539	22^{h} 35^{m} 48.82^{s}	−17° 27′ 37.1″	6.39	0.62	465	K4III	
240 G. Aqr			240		221308	116060	23^{h} 31^{m} 01.15^{s}	−06° 17′ 16.8″	6.39	−2.97	2433	K0	
67 Aqr		67	175		215143	112179	22^{h} 43^{m} 14.25^{s}	−06° 57′ 46.5″	6.40	1.14	368	A0Vn	
248 G. Aqr			248		221835	116428	23^{h} 35^{m} 32.07^{s}	−07° 27′ 52.1″	6.40	0.68	453	G5III:	
57 G. Aqr			57		202606	105079	21^{h} 17^{m} 13.54^{s}	−13° 16′ 44.3″	6.41	0.05	609	A1V	
IZ Aqr			79	IZ	205358	106544	21^{h} 34^{m} 42.76^{s}	+01° 49′ 45.1″	6.41	−1.98	1552	M3	irregular variable, V_{max} = 6.23^{m}, V_{min} = 6.47^{m}
152 G. Aqr			152		213198	111066	22^{h} 30^{m} 01.39^{s}	−12° 54′ 54.4″	6.41	1.86	264	F2/F3IV/V	
213 G. Aqr			213		218639	114371	23^{h} 09^{m} 49.53^{s}	−14° 30′ 37.9″	6.43	1.31	345	A0V	
236 G. Aqr			236		220766	115709	23^{h} 26^{m} 35.44^{s}	−21° 44′ 27.0″	6.43	1.01	396	K0III	double star
18 G. Aqr			18		198949	103154	20^{h} 53^{m} 58.37^{s}	−06° 53′ 21.9″	6.44	2.20	230	F1IV	
14 Aqr		14	54	IW	202466	105019	21^{h} 16^{m} 17.78^{s}	−09° 12′ 52.8″	6.45	−2.30	1831	M4III:	IW Aqr; double star; semiregular variable, ΔV = ~0.07^{m}, P = 163 d
72 G. Aqr			72		204041	105819	21^{h} 25^{m} 51.55^{s}	+00° 32′ 03.5″	6.45	1.75	284	A1IV	
HD 215114			174		215114	112168	22^{h} 43^{m} 03.40^{s}	−08° 18′ 41.2″	6.45	0.06	617	A5V	multiple star
1 G. Aqr			1		196676	101911	20^{h} 39^{m} 05.86^{s}	−04° 55′ 46.2″	6.46	2.18	234	K0	
233 G. Aqr			233		220466	115522	23^{h} 24^{m} 04.02^{s}	−21° 46′ 27.2″	6.46	2.48	204	F3IV/V	double star
EW Aqr			50	EW	201707	104634	21^{h} 11^{m} 41.31^{s}	−14° 28′ 20.6″	6.47	0.82	439	Fm delta Del	low-amplitude δ Sct variable, V_{max} = 6.41^{m}, V_{min} = 6.48^{m}, P = 0.0968946 d
55 G. Aqr			55		202554	105046	21^{h} 16^{m} 39.46^{s}	−01° 36′ 27.8″	6.48	−0.59	845	K0	
34 G. Aqr			34		200340	103889	21^{h} 02^{m} 59.62^{s}	−00° 55′ 29.1″	6.50	−1.75	1455	B6V	
241 G. Aqr			241		221356	116106	23^{h} 31^{m} 31.40^{s}	−04° 05′ 13.0″	6.50	4.41	86	F8V	
10 Aqr		10			199944	103681	21^{h} 00^{m} 32.660^{s}	−05° 28′ 38.46″	6.52		400	A5V	
9 Aqr		9			200004	103728	21^{h} 01^{m} 08.33321^{s}	−13° 31′ 47.9702″	6.55		700	G6/8III	
HD 210277			114		210277	109378	22^{h} 09^{m} 29.87^{s}	−07° 32′ 55.2″	6.63	4.99	69	G0V	has a planet (b)
37 Aqr		37	116		210422	109460	22^{h} 10^{m} 31.74^{s}	−10° 49′ 13.7″	6.64	0.97	444	K0	suspected variable
24 Aqr		24	83		206058	106942	21^{h} 39^{m} 31.39^{s}	−00° 03′ 04.1″	6.66	3.48	141	F7III	triple star
8 Aqr		8			199828	103640	20^{h} 59^{m} 54.82678^{s}	−13° 03′ 05.8699″	6.60		290	A3/4 IV	
85 Aqr		85			218173	114054	23^{h} 05^{m} 52.53078^{s}	−07° 56′ 12.1660″	6.69			B9 V	
75 Aqr		75			216567	113085	22^{h} 54^{m} 07.12256^{s}	−12° 11′ 25.5328″	6.86			K2/K3III	
54 Aqr		54			212741	110786	22^{h} 26^{m} 41.66612^{s}	−11° 13′ 41.5205″	6.98		270	A3III/IV	
36 Aqr		36			210269	109369	22^{h} 09^{m} 26.87980^{s}	−08° 11′ 08.6206″	6.98		520	G8/K0III/IV	a yellow giant star or subgiant star
72 Aqr		72			216182	112813	22^{h} 50^{m} 46.30141^{s}	−07° 18′ 42.9276″	7.00			K0 III	
65 Aqr		65			215097	112161	22^{h} 43^{m} 01.21581^{s}	−10° 06′ 09.6755″	7.04			K0 III	
84 Aqr		84			218081	114006	23^{h} 05^{m} 18.51768^{s}	−07° 45′ 16.8614″	7.08			G8III	
87 Aqr		87			218331	114164	23^{h} 07^{m} 11.70181^{s}	−07° 41′ 40.4985″	7.37			A0/1 IV	
HD 212771					212771	110813	22^{h} 27^{m} 03.07^{s}	−17° 15′ 49.2″	7.60	2.17	397	G8IV	Lionrock; has a planet (b)
HD 222582					222582	116906	23^{h} 41^{m} 51.53^{s}	−05° 59′ 08.7″	7.70	4.59	137	G5	has a planet (b)
HD 220689					220689	115662	23^{h} 25^{m} 53^{s}	−20° 36′ 58″	7.77	4.53	145	G3V	has a planet (b)
Gliese 884					217357	113576	23^{h} 00^{m} 16.12^{s}	−22° 31′ 27.65″	7.87	8.34	26.8	K7V + M0-2V	double star
HD 215152					215152	112190	22^{h} 43^{m} 21^{s}	−06° 24′ 03″	8.13	6.47	70	K0	has four planets (b, c, d & e)
HD 221416					221416	116158	23^{h} 32^{m} 08.1^{s}	−21° 48′ 05″	8.15		310	K0IV/V	has a planet (b)
HD 206610					206610	107251	21^{h} 43^{m} 24.90^{s}	−07° 24′ 29.7″	8.34	2.19	555	K0III	Bosona; has a planet (b)
Gliese 898					221503	116215	23^{h} 32^{m} 49.398^{s}	−16° 50′ 44.32″	8.607	7.68	45.5	K6V	
104 Aqr B	A^{2}	104			222561	116904	23^{h} 41^{m} 46.39^{s}	−17° 47′ 00.5″	8.52	1.29	911	A6V:	component of the 104 Aqr system
WASP-69							21^{h} 00^{m} 06.0^{s}	−05° 05′ 40″	9.87	6.38	163	K5	has a transiting planet (b)
Gl 876				IL		113020	22^{h} 53^{m} 16.73^{s}	−14° 15′ 49.3″	10.17	11.81	15.3	M3.5V	IL Aqr; nearby red dwarf, BY Dra variable, V_{max} = 10.15^{m}, V_{min} = 10.21^{m}; has four planets (b, c, d & e)
Gl 849						109388	22^{h} 09^{m} 40.35^{s}	−04° 38′ 26.6″	10.42	10.70	29	M3.5	has two planets (b & c)
WASP-70 A							21^{h} 01^{m} 54.0^{s}	−13° 26′ 00″	10.79	3.84	799	G4	has a transiting planet (b)
WASP-75							22^{h} 49^{m} 33.0^{s}	−10° 40′ 32″	11.45	4.38	848	F9	has a transiting planet (b)
AE Aqr				AE		101991	20^{h} 40^{m} 09.16^{s}	−00° 52′ 15.0″	11.6	6.56	333	K2Ve + pec(e+cont)	DQ Her-type cataclysmic variable, V_{max} = 10.18^{m}, V_{min} = 12.12^{m}
WASP-177							22^{h} 19^{m} 11.0^{s}	−01° 50′ 04″	11.6		581	K2	has a transiting planet (b)
WASP-47							22^{h} 04^{m} 49.0^{s}	−12° 01′ 08″	11.9	5.4	652	G9V	has four transiting planets (b, c, d & e)
EZ Aqr				EZ			22^{h} 38^{m} 33.62^{s}	−15° 17′ 59.2″	12.18	14.49	11.3	M5.5Ve-M7e	12th closest star system; triple star; flare star
WASP-6							23^{h} 12^{m} 38.0^{s}	−22° 40′ 26″	12.4	4.96	1001	G8	Márohu; has a transiting planet (b)
WASP-147							23^{h} 56^{m} 46.0^{s}	−22° 09′ 11″	12.31		1389	G4	has a transiting planet (b)
LP 876-10							22^{h} 48^{m} 04.47^{s}	−24° 22′ 07.5″	12.62			M4V	Fomalhaut C
WASP-165							23^{h} 50^{m} 19.3^{s}	−17° 04′ 39″	12.69			G6	has a transiting planet (b)
WASP-146							23^{h} 56^{m} 22.0^{s}	−13° 16′ 18″	12.90		1373	G0	has a transiting planet (b)
BPS CS22892-0052							22^{h} 17^{m} 01.5^{s}	−16° 39′ 26″	13.20	13.99	15330	KIIvw	Sneden's Star; ultra-metal-poor star
FO Aqr				FO			22^{h} 17^{m} 55.43^{s}	−08° 21′ 04.6″	13.5				DQ Her-type cataclysmic variable, V_{max} = 12.7^{m}, V_{min} = 14.2^{m}, P = 0.202060 d
Table legend: • Name = Proper name • B = Bayer designation • F or/and G. = Flamsteed designation or Gould designation • Var = Variable-star designation • HD = Henry Draper Catalogue designation number • HIP = Hipparcos Catalogue designation number • RA = Right ascension for the Epoch/Equinox J2000.0 • Dec = Declination for the Epoch/Equinox J2000.0 • vis. mag. = visual magnitude (m or m_{v}), also known as apparent magnitude • abs. mag. = absolute magnitude (M_{v}) • Dist. (ly) = Distance in light-years from Earth • Sp. class = Spectral class of the star in the stellar classification system • Notes = Common name(s) or alternate name(s); comments; notable properties [for example: multiple star status, range of variability if it is a variable star, exoplanets, etc.]

== See also ==
- List of stars by constellation
