= A Aquarii =

The Bayer designation A Aquarii is shared by two stars in the constellation Aquarius:

- A^{1} Aquarii or 103 Aquarii
- A^{2} Aquarii or 104 Aquarii, itself a double star

== See also ==
- α Aquarii (Sadalmelik)
