= Boinayel =

Boinayel may refer to:

- Boinayel, the Rain Giver; the Taino deity, a Zemi
- WASP-6b (planet), Star Márohu, Constellation Aquarius; an exoplanet named after a Taíno deity.
