= Márohu =

Márohu or Marohu may refer to:

- Marohu (a.k.a. Márohu, or Taino Marohu), the spirit of clear skies of the Taíno
- WASP-6 (star), Constellation Aquarius; a G8-type yellow dwarf star; named after the Taino Marohu
