= LP Aquarii =

Star in the constellation Aquarius

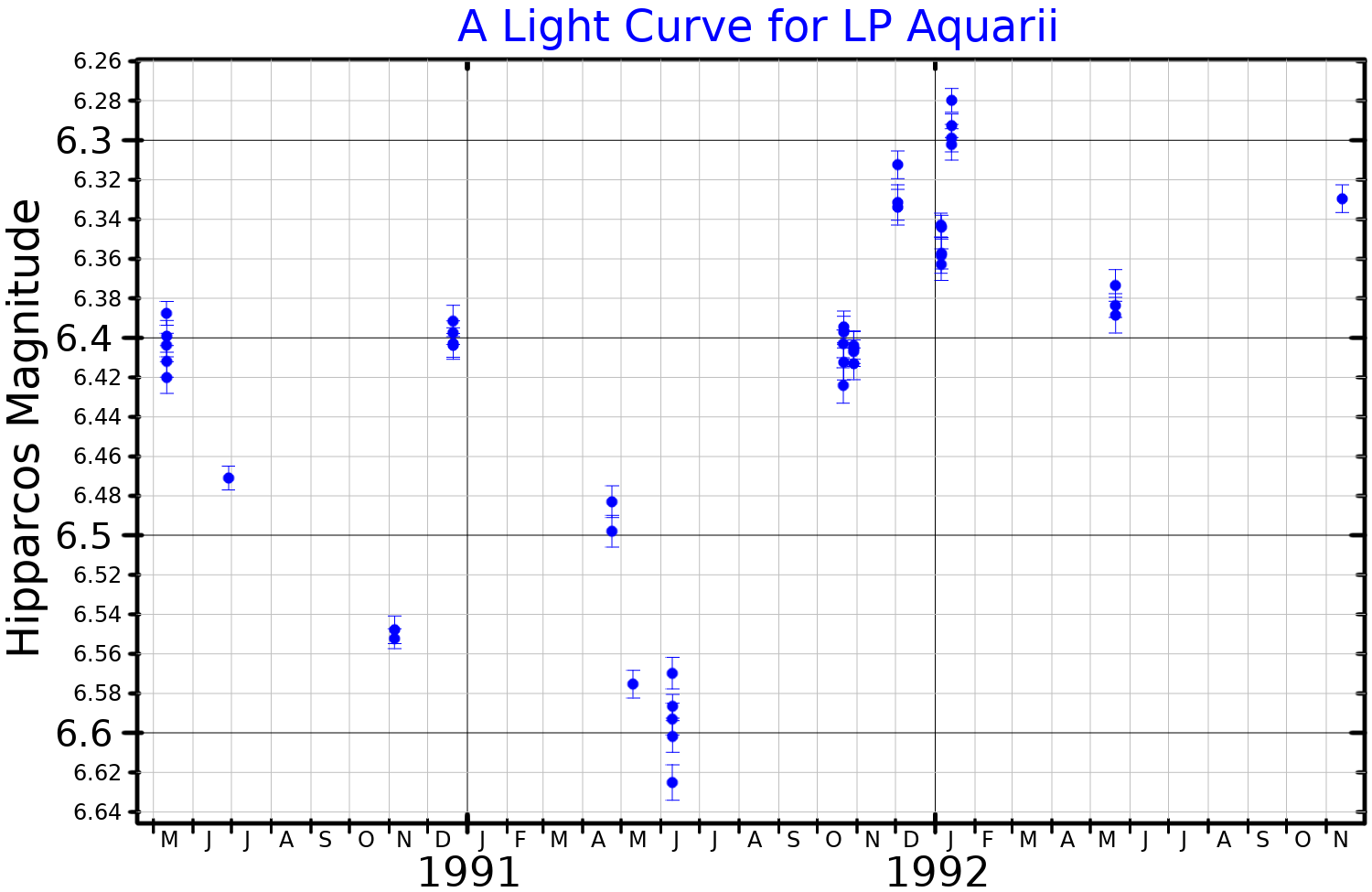
- A light curve for LP Aquarii, plotted from Hipparcos data

Observation data Epoch J2000 Equinox ICRS
- Constellation: Aquarius
- Right ascension: 22^{h} 42^{m} 06.026^{s}
- Declination: −05° 06′ 07.03″
- Apparent magnitude (V): 6.30 - 6.64

Characteristics
- Spectral type: M4III
- Variable type: Lb

Astrometry
Radial velocity (R_{v})	−175.81 km/s
Proper motion (μ)	RA: +69.323 mas/yr Dec.: −49.636 mas/yr
Parallax (π)	3.6849±0.1178 mas
Distance	890 ± 30 ly (271 ± 9 pc)
Absolute magnitude (M_{V})	−0.307

Details
Mass	1.558 M_{☉}
Radius	83+15 −11 R_{☉}
Luminosity	1,011±66 L_{☉}
Surface gravity (log g)	0.476 cgs
Temperature	3,582+254 −278 K
Metallicity [Fe/H]	−0.045 dex

Other designations
- LP Aqr, BD−05°5843, HD 214983, HIP 112078, SAO 146251, CCDM J22421-0507A

Database references
SIMBAD	data

LP Aquarii is a pulsating variable star in the constellation of Aquarius that varies between magnitudes 6.30 and 6.64. The position of the star near the ecliptic means it is subject to lunar occultations.

The star's variability was first detected in the Hipparcos satellite data, and it was given its variable star designation in 1999.
