= HD 215152 =

Star in the constellation Aquarius

Observation data Epoch J2000.0 Equinox ICRS
- Constellation: Aquarius
- Right ascension: 22^{h} 43^{m} 21.3028^{s}
- Declination: −06° 24′ 02.953″
- Apparent magnitude (V): 8.13

Characteristics
- Evolutionary stage: main sequence
- Spectral type: K3 V
- B−V color index: 0.968

Astrometry
| Radial velocity (R_{v}) | −13.88±0.13 km/s |
| Proper motion (μ) | RA: −154.095 mas/yr Dec.: −289.915 mas/yr |
| Parallax (π) | 46.3324±0.0238 mas |
| Distance | 70.39 ± 0.04 ly (21.58 ± 0.01 pc) |
| Absolute magnitude (M_{V}) | +6.45 |

Details
| Mass | 0.756±0.016 M_{☉} |
| Surface gravity (log g) | 4.26±0.15 cgs |
| Temperature | 4,803±52 K |
| Metallicity [Fe/H] | −0.08±0.02 dex |
| Rotation | 36.5±1.6 d |
| Rotational velocity (v sin i) | 3.35 km/s |
| Age | 5.207±4.069 Gyr |

Other designations
- BD−07°5839, GJ 4291, HD 215152, HIP 112190, SAO 146275, 2MASS J22432131-0624025

Database references
| SIMBAD | data |
| Exoplanet Archive | data |
| ARICNS | data |

HD 215152 is a star in the zodiac constellation of Aquarius. It has an apparent visual magnitude of 8.13, meaning it is too faint to be seen with the naked eye. Parallax measurements provide distance estimates of around 70 light years. The star has a relatively high proper motion, moving across the sky at an estimated 0.328 arc seconds per year along a position angle of 205°.

A 2015 survey ruled out the existence of any additional stellar companions at projected distances from 6 to 145 astronomical units.

This star has a stellar classification of K3 V, which indicates that it is an ordinary K-type main sequence star. Based upon observation of regular variations in chromospheric activity, it has a rotation period of 36.5±1.6 days. Stellar models give an estimated mass of around 76% of the Sun. It has a slightly lower metallicity than the Sun, and thus has a lower abundance of elements other than hydrogen and helium. The effective temperature of the stellar atmosphere is about 4,803 K, giving it the orange-hued glow of an ordinary K-type star.

HD 215152 is a candidate for possessing a debris disk—a circumstellar disk of orbiting dust and debris. This finding was made through the detection of an infrared excess at a wavelength of 70 μm by the Spitzer Space Telescope. The detection has a 3σ level of certainty.

== Planetary system ==
HD 215152 has a total of four confirmed sub-Neptune mass planets, all of which are potentially rocky. With all of the planets orbiting within 0.154 AU, it is a very compact system. The inner two are separated by only 0.0098 AU, or about four times the distance between the Earth and the Moon. This is unusual for systems discovered by radial velocity measurements. In 2011, it was reported that two planetary candidates (c and d) had been detected in close orbit around this star. The planets were discovered through Doppler spectroscopy using the HARPS spectrograph at La Silla Observatory in Chile. Their presence was revealed by periodic variations in the radial velocity of the host star due to gravitational perturbations by the orbiting objects. In 2018, two more planets were confirmed. All planets have brief orbital periods: the four planets orbit every 5.76, 7.28, 10.86 and 25.2 days respectively. Their minimum masses range between 1.7 and 2.9 Earth masses; stability analysis suggests their true masses could be just over double their minimum masses before the system would become dynamically unstable.

There is a gap between orbits of HD 215152 d and HD 215152 e, which may contain a fifth, yet-undetected terrestrial low-mass planet.

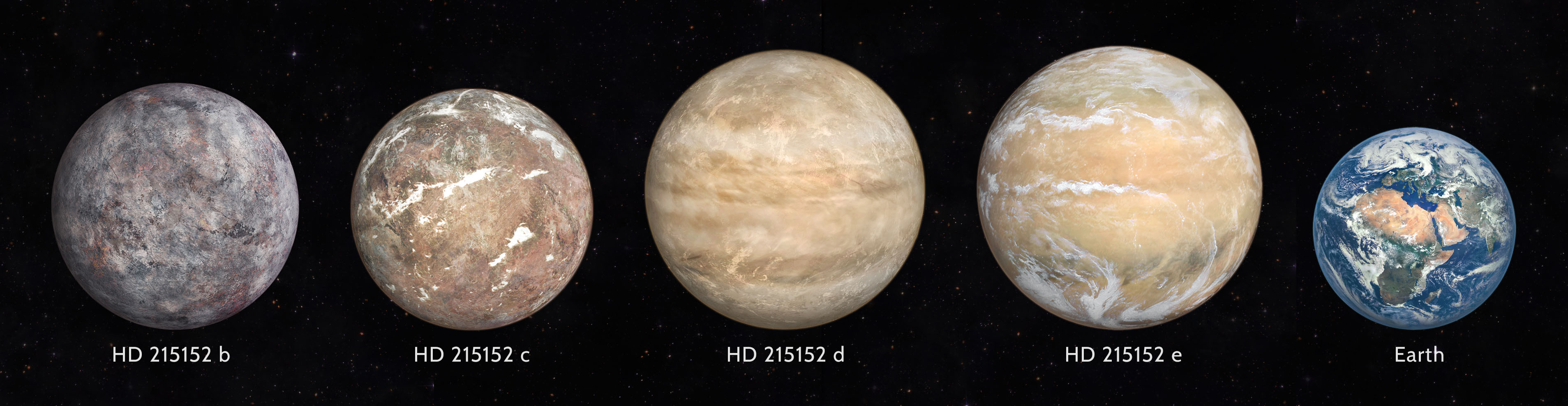
Artist's impression and size comparison of the four known planets of HD 215152 system with Earth, assuming Earth-like composition

The HD 215152 planetary system
| Companion | Minimum mass (M_{⊕}) | Maximum mass (M_{⊕}) | Semi-major axis (AU) | Orbital period (days) | Eccentricity | Inclination | Radius (R_{⊕}) |
|---|---|---|---|---|---|---|---|
| b | ≥1.819+0.501 −0.629 | 3.75 | 0.057638+0.000739 −0.000759 | 5.75999+0.00157 −0.00175 | Probably ≤0.03 | — | — |
| c | ≥1.720+0.618 −0.725 | 3.67 | 0.067393+0.000860 −0.000893 | 7.28243+0.00451 −0.00827 | Probably ≤0.03 | — | — |
| d | ≥2.801+0.809 −0.923 | 5.11 | 0.08799+0.00113 −0.00116 | 10.86499+0.00564 −0.00613 | Probably ≤0.03 | — | — |
| e | ≥2.877+1.063 −1.481 | 6.55 | 0.15417+0.00199 −0.00204 | 25.1967+0.0476 −0.0505 | Probably ≤0.03 | — | — |
