= HD 222582 b =

Extrasolar planet

Discovery
- Discovered by: California and Carnegie Planet Search
- Discovery site: W. M. Keck Observatory
- Discovery date: November 1, 1999
- Detection method: Doppler spectroscopy

Orbital characteristics
- Semi-major axis: 1.35 AU (202,000,000 km)
- Eccentricity: 0.76
- Orbital period (sidereal): 572 d
- Time of periastron: 2,450,174.8
- Argument of periastron: 293
- Semi-amplitude: 276.6
- Star: HD 222582

Physical characteristics
- Mean radius: 1.12 R_{J} Estimate
- Mass: 8.37 M_{J}

HD 222582 b is an extrasolar planet that is 8.37 times the mass of Jupiter orbiting the star HD 222582. The orbital period is 572 days and orbits at a semimajor axis of 1.35 AU in one of the most eccentric orbits of the known planets.

== See also ==
- Gas giant
- List of exoplanets discovered before 2000
