= WASP-75 =

Star in the constellation Aquarius

Observation data Epoch J2000 Equinox ICRS
- Constellation: Aquarius
- Right ascension: 22^{h} 49^{m} 32.5676^{s}
- Declination: −10° 40′ 31.926″
- Apparent magnitude (V): 11.299

Characteristics
- Evolutionary stage: Main sequence
- Spectral type: F9

Astrometry
Radial velocity (R_{v})	2.7±0.8 km/s
Proper motion (μ)	RA: 45.892 mas/yr Dec.: 15.428 mas/yr
Parallax (π)	3.3387±0.0202 mas
Distance	977 ± 6 ly (300 ± 2 pc)

Details
Mass	1.18 M_{☉}
Radius	1.39 R_{☉}
Luminosity	1.1±0.01 L_{☉}
Surface gravity (log g)	4.233 cgs
Temperature	6090 K
Metallicity [Fe/H]	0.07±0.09 dex
Rotation	11.2±1.5 d
Age	2.9±0.2 Gyr

Other designations
- BD−11 5929, K2-40, EPIC 206154641, GSC 05816-01135, 2MASS J22493256-1040320, Gaia DR3 2605161444735454464

Database references
SIMBAD	data

WASP-75 is an F-type main-sequence star about 980 light-years away. The star is much younger than the Sun at approximately 2.9 billion years. WASP-75 is similar to the Sun in its concentration of heavy elements.

== Planetary system ==
In 2013, a transiting hot Jupiter planet b was detected on a tight, circular orbit, and the planet was confirmed in 2018. Its equilibrium temperature is 1,688 K.

The WASP-75 planetary system
Companion (in order from star)	Mass	Semimajor axis (AU)	Orbital period (days)	Eccentricity	Inclination (°)	Radius
b	1.08±0.05 M_{J}	0.0377±0.0006	2.484193	<0.1	81.96±0.02	1.31±0.02 R_{J}
