= HD 214810 =

Binary star system in the constellation Aquarius

Observation data Epoch J2000 Equinox ICRS
- Constellation: Aquarius
- Right ascension: 22^{h} 40^{m} 47.95600^{s}
- Declination: −03° 33′ 15.2789″
- Apparent magnitude (V): 6.32 (6.52 + 8.63)

Characteristics
- Spectral type: G9 V Fe-0.7
- U−B color index: −0.02
- B−V color index: +0.52

Astrometry
Radial velocity (R_{v})	13.73 km/s
Proper motion (μ)	RA: −7.52 mas/yr Dec.: −45.25 mas/yr
Parallax (π)	28.93±0.77 mas
Distance	113 ± 3 ly (34.6 ± 0.9 pc)
Absolute magnitude (M_{V})	+3.63

Orbit
Period (P)	54.57±0.30 yr
Semi-major axis (a)	0.367±0.003″
Eccentricity (e)	0.005±0.003
Inclination (i)	87.5±0.5°
Longitude of the node (Ω)	128.9±0.5°
Periastron epoch (T)	B 1969.38±1.5
Argument of periastron (ω) (secondary)	12.9±20.0°

Details

HD 214810 A
Mass	1.26 M_{☉}
Surface gravity (log g)	4.19 cgs
Temperature	6,151 K
Metallicity [Fe/H]	−0.22 dex
Age	3.7 Gyr

HD 214810 B
Mass	0.87 M_{☉}

Other designations
- BD−04°5728, HD 214810, HIP 111965, HR 8629, SAO 146239

Database references
SIMBAD	data

HD 214810 is a visual binary star in the equatorial constellation of Aquarius. The pair orbit each other with a period of about 54.2 years.
