= HD 208177 =

Double star system in the constellation Aquarius

Observation data Epoch J2000 Equinox ICRS
- Constellation: Aquarius
- HD 208177
- Right ascension: 21^{h} 54^{m} 35.915^{s}
- Declination: −03° 18′ 04.58″
- Apparent magnitude (V): 6.20
- companion
- Right ascension: 21^{h} 54^{m} 45.312^{s}
- Declination: −03° 18′ 34.35″
- Apparent magnitude (V): 15.16

Characteristics

HD 208177
- Evolutionary stage: main sequence
- Spectral type: F6/7V
- U−B color index: 0.07
- B−V color index: 0.48

companion
- Evolutionary stage: main sequence
- Spectral type: M3.5V

Astrometry

HD 208177
Radial velocity (R_{v})	−20 km/s
Proper motion (μ)	RA: +26.272 mas/yr Dec.: −33.683 mas/yr
Parallax (π)	13.7652±0.0717 mas
Distance	237 ± 1 ly (72.6 ± 0.4 pc)
Absolute magnitude (M_{V})	+2.05

companion
Radial velocity (R_{v})	−14.33±2.85 km/s
Proper motion (μ)	RA: +27.675 mas/yr Dec.: −33.708 mas/yr
Parallax (π)	13.7048±0.0269 mas
Distance	238.0 ± 0.5 ly (73.0 ± 0.1 pc)

Details

HD 208177
Mass	1.63 M_{☉}
Radius	2.87 R_{☉}
Luminosity	14 L_{☉}
Surface gravity (log g)	3.66 cgs
Temperature	6,577 K
Metallicity [Fe/H]	0.30 dex
Rotational velocity (v sin i)	80 km/s
Age	1.70 Gyr

companion
Mass	0.32 M_{☉}
Radius	0.40 R_{☉}
Luminosity	0.018 L_{☉}
Surface gravity (log g)	4.83 cgs
Temperature	3,341 K

Other designations
- BD−03°5329, HD 208177, HIP 108144, HR 8363, SAO 145735
- companion: Gaia DR3 2670423305295264256

Database references
SIMBAD	data

Data sources:

Hipparcos Catalogue, CCDM (2002), Bright Star Catalogue (5th rev. ed.)

HD 208177 is a binary star system in the equatorial constellation of Aquarius. They are faintly visible to the naked eye with an apparent magnitude of 6.20. The pair have an angular separation of 144″ and the companion is of 15th magnitude.

The primary component is a main-sequence star with a stellar classification of F6/7V. It has an estimated 163% of the Sun's mass and is about 1.7 billion years old The companion is only 0.32 M_{☉}.
