= HD 223311 =

Star in the constellation Aquarius

Observation data Epoch J2000 Equinox ICRS
- Constellation: Aquarius
- Right ascension: 23^{h} 48^{m} 32.47911^{s}
- Declination: −06° 22′ 49.5328″
- Apparent magnitude (V): 6.08

Characteristics
- Spectral type: K4III
- U−B color index: +1.71
- B−V color index: +1.452
- Variable type: suspected

Astrometry
Radial velocity (R_{v})	−20.069±0.008 km/s
Proper motion (μ)	RA: +0.01 mas/yr Dec.: −19.04 mas/yr
Parallax (π)	3.5950±0.0884 mas
Distance	910 ± 20 ly (278 ± 7 pc)
Absolute magnitude (M_{V})	−0.80

Details
Mass	5.0 M_{☉}
Radius	40.78+3.27 −7.51 R_{☉}
Luminosity	496±15 L_{☉}
Surface gravity (log g)	1.04 cgs
Temperature	4,267+457 −162 K
Metallicity [Fe/H]	−0.43 dex
Rotational velocity (v sin i)	1.7 km/s
Age	1.8 Gyr

Other designations
- NSV 14715, BD−07°6086, FK5 3912, HD 223311, HIP 117420, HR 9014, SAO 146919

Database references
SIMBAD	data

HD 223311 is a star in the equatorial constellation of Aquarius. It has an orange hue and is visible to the naked eye as a dim star with an apparent visual magnitude of 6.08. Based on parallax measurements, the star is located at a distance of approximately 910 light years from the Sun. It is a radial velocity standard star that is drifting closer to the Sun at the rate of −20 km/s. The star is situated near the ecliptic and thus is subject to lunar occultations.

This is an aging K-type giant star with a stellar classification of K4III. Having exhausted the supply of hydrogen at its core, it has cooled and expanded off the main sequence. At present it has 41 times the girth of the Sun. It is a suspected variable star of unknown type that has been measured ranging in brightness from magnitude 5.01 down to 5.26 in the infrared I band. The star is radiating 496 times the luminosity of the Sun from its swollen photosphere at an effective temperature of 4,267 K.
