= HD 202259 =

Star in the constellation Aquarius

Observation data Epoch J2000 Equinox ICRS
- Constellation: Aquarius
- Right ascension: 21^{h} 14^{m} 37.04896^{s}
- Declination: +00° 05′ 32.1202″
- Apparent magnitude (V): 6.39

Characteristics
- Evolutionary stage: AGB
- Spectral type: M1 III
- U−B color index: +1.937
- B−V color index: +1.608
- Variable type: Suspected

Astrometry
Radial velocity (R_{v})	−123.5 km/s
Proper motion (μ)	RA: +35.471 mas/yr Dec.: −13.260 mas/yr
Parallax (π)	3.4472±0.0290 mas
Distance	946 ± 8 ly (290 ± 2 pc)
Absolute magnitude (M_{V})	−0.88

Details
Mass	1.9 M_{☉}
Radius	50 R_{☉}
Luminosity	693 L_{☉}
Surface gravity (log g)	1.68 cgs
Temperature	3,933 K
Metallicity [Fe/H]	−0.23 dex

Other designations
- BD−00°4186, HD 202259, HIP 104872, HR 8121, NSV 13614, SAO 145229.

Database references
SIMBAD	data

Data sources:

Hipparcos Catalogue, CCDM (2002), Bright Star Catalogue (5th rev. ed.)

HD 202259 is a suspected variable star in the equatorial constellation of Aquarius. With an apparent magnitude of 6.39, according to the Bortle scale it is faintly visible to the naked eye from dark rural skies. It has a stellar classification of M1 III, and is a red giant located along the asymptotic giant branch of the HR diagram. Located about 946 light years away, its radial velocity of −123.5 km/s indicates this is a high-velocity star.
