= HD 215114 =

Double star in the constellation Aquarius

Observation data Epoch J2000 Equinox ICRS
- Constellation: Aquarius
- Right ascension: 22^{h} 43^{m} 03.41351^{s}
- Declination: −08° 18′ 41.1864″
- Apparent magnitude (V): 6.45

Characteristics
- Spectral type: A5V
- U−B color index: +0.12
- B−V color index: +0.17

Astrometry
Radial velocity (R_{v})	5.00 km/s
Proper motion (μ)	RA: +15.73 mas/yr Dec.: −4.03 mas/yr
Parallax (π)	5.28±1.75 mas
Distance	approx. 600 ly (approx. 190 pc)
Absolute magnitude (M_{V})	+0.67

Details

A
Mass	1.9 M_{☉}
Radius	3.4 R_{☉}
Luminosity	41 L_{☉}
Surface gravity (log g)	3.67 cgs
Temperature	7,980 K
Rotational velocity (v sin i)	159 km/s
Age	288 Myr

B
Mass	1.8 M_{☉}
Radius	2.1 R_{☉}
Luminosity	14 L_{☉}
Surface gravity (log g)	4.03 cgs
Temperature	7,648 K

Other designations
- BD−09°6038, HIP 112168, HR 8645, SAO 146271, WDS J22431-0819

Database references
SIMBAD	data

HD 215114 is a double star in the equatorial constellation of Aquarius. As of 2012, the pair have an angular separation of 2.29″ along a position angle of 306.4°.
