= 42 Aquarii =

Star in the constellation Aquarius

Observation data Epoch J2000.0 Equinox ICRS
- Constellation: Aquarius
- Right ascension: 22^{h} 16^{m} 48.04643^{s}
- Declination: −12° 49′ 53.1673″
- Apparent magnitude (V): 5.34

Characteristics
- Evolutionary stage: giant
- Spectral type: K1 III
- B−V color index: 1.132±0.001

Astrometry
Radial velocity (R_{v})	+13.0±4.2 km/s
Proper motion (μ)	RA: +1.89 mas/yr Dec.: +5.03 mas/yr
Parallax (π)	7.3032±0.1451 mas
Distance	447 ± 9 ly (137 ± 3 pc)
Absolute magnitude (M_{V})	−0.93

Details
Mass	3.14±0.27 M_{☉}
Radius	11.24+0.23 −0.32 R_{☉}
Luminosity	69.950±3.907 L_{☉}
Surface gravity (log g)	2.90 cgs
Temperature	4,980+71 −51 K
Metallicity [Fe/H]	+0.00±0.04 dex
Rotational velocity (v sin i)	3.43 km/s
Age	470±150 Myr

Other designations
- 42 Aqr, BD−13°6148, HD 211361, HIP 110000, HR 8496, SAO 164974

Database references
SIMBAD	data

42 Aquarii is a single star located 447 light years away from the Sun in the zodiac constellation of Aquarius. 42 Aquarii is its Flamsteed designation. It is visible to the naked eye as a faint, orange-hued star with an apparent visual magnitude of 5.34. This object is moving further from the Sun with a heliocentric radial velocity of around +13 km/s.

This object is an evolved giant star with a stellar classification of K1 III, most likely (82% chance) on the horizontal branch. It is around 470 million years old with a projected rotational velocity of 3.4 km/s. The star has over three times the mass of the Sun and has expanded to 11 times the Sun's radius. It is radiating 70 times the luminosity of the Sun from its enlarged photosphere at an effective temperature of 4,980 K.
