= HD 210434 =

Star in the constellation Aquarius

Observation data Epoch J2000 Equinox ICRS
- Constellation: Aquarius
- Right ascension: 22^{h} 10^{m} 33.74708^{s}
- Declination: −04° 16′ 00.6788″
- Apparent magnitude (V): 5.979

Characteristics
- Evolutionary stage: red giant branch
- Spectral type: G8/K0III
- U−B color index: 0.84
- B−V color index: 0.981

Astrometry
Radial velocity (R_{v})	−18.1 km/s
Proper motion (μ)	RA: +70.600 mas/yr Dec.: +3.340 mas/yr
Parallax (π)	10.3957±0.0439 mas
Distance	314 ± 1 ly (96.2 ± 0.4 pc)
Absolute magnitude (M_{V})	1.30

Details
Mass	2.5 M_{☉}
Radius	8.5 R_{☉}
Luminosity	40 L_{☉}
Surface gravity (log g)	2.91 cgs
Temperature	4,910 K
Metallicity [Fe/H]	0.090±0.090 dex
Rotational velocity (v sin i)	3.3 km/s
Age	557 Myr

Other designations
- BD−04°5625, HD 210434, HIP 109466, HR 8453, SAO 145916

Database references
SIMBAD	data

HD 210434 is a giant star in the equatorial constellation of Aquarius. According to the Bortle scale, an apparent magnitude of six means this star is faintly visible to the naked eye from dark rural skies. It is an estimated 557 million years old with 2.4 times the mass of the Sun.
