= 82 Aquarii =

Star in the constellation Aquarius

Observation data Epoch J2000 Equinox ICRS
- Constellation: Aquarius
- Right ascension: 23^{h} 02^{m} 32.55694^{s}
- Declination: −06° 34′ 26.4458″
- Apparent magnitude (V): 6.15

Characteristics
- Evolutionary stage: giant
- Spectral type: M2 III
- U−B color index: +1.90
- B−V color index: +1.58
- Variable type: suspected

Astrometry
Radial velocity (R_{v})	−3.59±0.17 km/s
Proper motion (μ)	RA: −7.224 mas/yr Dec.: −33.786 mas/yr
Parallax (π)	3.6764±0.1715 mas
Distance	890 ± 40 ly (270 ± 10 pc)

Details
Radius	56.33+5.50 −7.78 R_{☉}
Luminosity	692.8±37.1 L_{☉}
Temperature	3,946+305 −180 K

Other designations
- 82 Aqr, NSV 25999, BD−07°5913, HD 217701, HIP 113781, HR 8763, SAO 146465

Database references
SIMBAD	data

82 Aquarii is a star in the equatorial constellation of Aquarius. 82 Aquarii is its Flamsteed designation. It has an apparent visual magnitude of 6.15, which, according to the Bortle Dark-Sky Scale, means it is a faint star that requires dark rural skies to view. The annual parallax shift of 82 Aquarii is 3.6764±0.1715 mas, which equates to a distance of roughly 890 light-years (270 parsecs) from Earth. Because this star is positioned near the ecliptic, it is subject to lunar eclipses.

This object is an aging red giant star currently on the asymptotic giant branch with a stellar classification of M2 III, having exhausted both the hydrogen and helium at its core and expanded to 56 times the Sun's radius. It is a suspected variable star of unknown type that ranges in magnitude between 6.24 and 6.29. The star is radiating 693 times the luminosity of the Sun from its swollen photosphere at an effective temperature of 3,946 K.
