= 1 Aquarii =

Binary star in the constellation Aquarius

- Location of 1 Aqr (circled)

Observation data Epoch J2000 Equinox ICRS
- Constellation: Aquarius
- Right ascension: 20^{h} 39^{m} 24.8927^{s}
- Declination: +00° 29′ 11.155″
- Apparent magnitude (V): 5.151

Characteristics
- Evolutionary stage: horizontal branch
- Spectral type: K1III
- U−B color index: 0.936
- B−V color index: 1.060

Astrometry
| Radial velocity (R_{v}) | −40.93(3) km/s |
| Proper motion (μ) | RA: 96.805(120) mas/yr Dec.: −10.140(94) mas/yr |
| Parallax (π) | 12.3852±0.1134 mas |
| Distance | 263 ± 2 ly (80.7 ± 0.7 pc) |
| Absolute magnitude (M_{V}) | 0.77 |

Orbit
| Primary | 1 Aquarii A |
| Name | 1 Aquarii B |
| Period (P) | 1966.7±2.9 days |
| Eccentricity (e) | 0.368±0.009 |
| Periastron epoch (T) | 54740±7 |
| Argument of periastron (ω) (secondary) | 150.7±1.6° |
| Semi-amplitude (K_{1}) (primary) | 3.24±0.04 km/s |

Details
| Mass | 1.50±0.43 M_{☉} |
| Radius | 11 R_{☉} |
| Luminosity | 53.7 L_{☉} |
| Surface gravity (log g) | 2.63±0.11 cgs |
| Temperature | 4715±15 K |
| Metallicity | −0.12 |
| Rotational velocity (v sin i) | 1.8 km/s |
| Age | 1.26 Gyr |

Other designations
- 1 Aqr, BD−00°4064, FK5 3651, HD 196758, HIP 101936, HR 7897, SAO 126062, CCDM J20394+0029, WDS J20394+0029

Database references
| SIMBAD | data |

1 Aquarii, or WDS J20394+0029, is a binary star system in the zodiac constellation of Aquarius, about 263 light years away from the Sun. 1 Aquarii is its Flamsteed designation. It is visible to the naked eye as a faint, orange-hued star with an apparent visual magnitude of 5.151, located a degree north of the celestial equator. The system is moving closer to the Earth with a heliocentric radial velocity of −41 km/s.

Systematic observation for determining the orbit of this system began in 2002, some eighty years following the first radial velocity measurements. It is a single-lined spectroscopic binary with an orbital period of 5.385 yr and an eccentricity of 0.368. The visible component is an aging giant star with a stellar classification of K1III. At the age of 1.26 billion years old it is a red clump giant, which indicates it is on the horizontal branch and is generating energy through helium fusion at its core. The star has 1.5 times the mass of the Sun and has expanded to 11 times the Sun's radius. It is radiating 53.7 times the Sun's luminosity from its enlarged photosphere at an effective temperature of 4,715 K.

The mass of the companion appears small, suggesting a red dwarf no higher than class M5. In addition to the spectroscopic companion there are two faint optical companions that have no physical relation to 1 Aqr.

== Etymology ==
1 Aquarii was known to the ancients as al-sa'd al-malik, or "the lucky star of the king." Interpreting the unexpressed Arabic vowels, al-sa'd al-mulk, gives an alternate translation of "the lucky star of the kingdom." In English, the name is Sadalmelik (or Sadalmelek), now used for the star Alpha Aquarii.
