= HD 211575 =

Star in the constellation Aquarius

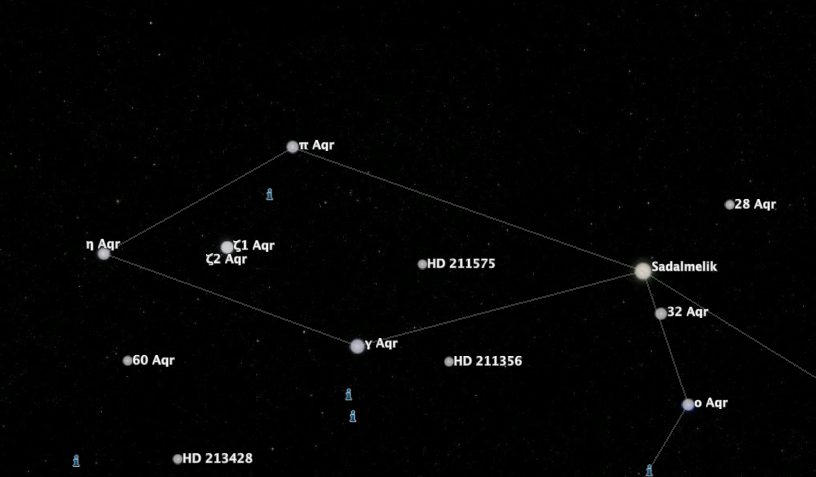
- The region around HD 211575

Observation data Epoch J2000 Equinox ICRS
- Constellation: Aquarius
- Right ascension: 22^{h} 18^{m} 04.2721^{s}
- Declination: −00° 14′ 15.558″
- Apparent magnitude (V): 6.40

Characteristics
- Evolutionary stage: main sequence
- Spectral type: F3 V
- B−V color index: 0.441±0.003

Astrometry
Radial velocity (R_{v})	+15.41±0.13 km/s
Proper motion (μ)	RA: −41.947 mas/yr Dec.: −54.370 mas/yr
Parallax (π)	23.9800±0.0282 mas
Distance	136.0 ± 0.2 ly (41.70 ± 0.05 pc)
Absolute magnitude (M_{V})	3.31

Details
Mass	1.27 M_{☉}
Luminosity	4.30 L_{☉}
Surface gravity (log g)	4.15 cgs
Temperature	6,574±224 K
Metallicity [Fe/H]	+0.11±0.11 dex
Rotational velocity (v sin i)	19.0 km/s
Age	150 Myr

Other designations
- BD−00°4333, HD 203222, HIP 110091, HR 8507, SAO 146004

Database references
SIMBAD	data

HD 211575 is a star in the constellation Aquarius in between Gamma Aquarii, Pi Aquarii and Alpha Aquarii. It is a member of the corona of the Ursa Major moving group.
