= HD 214448 =

Binary star in the constellation Aquarius

Observation data Epoch J2000 Equinox ICRS
- Constellation: Aquarius
- Right ascension: 22^{h} 38^{m} 22.14533^{s}
- Declination: −07° 53′ 51.2116″
- Apparent magnitude (V): 6.23 (6.64/8.11)

Characteristics
- Spectral type: K0III + F2
- U−B color index: +0.49
- B−V color index: +0.78
- Variable type: Suspected

Astrometry
Radial velocity (R_{v})	−18.34±0.27 km/s
Proper motion (μ)	RA: +74.25 mas/yr Dec.: −0.98 mas/yr
Parallax (π)	8.38±0.62 mas
Distance	390 ± 30 ly (119 ± 9 pc)
Absolute magnitude (M_{V})	0.498

Orbit
Period (P)	147.07±8.09 yr
Semi-major axis (a)	0.249±0.051″
Eccentricity (e)	0.44±0.37
Inclination (i)	73.6±6.2°
Longitude of the node (Ω)	110.3±3.3°
Argument of periastron (ω) (secondary)	191.9±14.7°

Details
Temperature	5,645 K

Other designations
- BD−08°5912, HD 214448, HIP 111761, HR 8612, SAO 146216, WDS J22384-0754

Database references
SIMBAD	data

Data sources:

Hipparcos Catalogue, CCDM (2002), Bright Star Catalogue (5th rev. ed.)

HD 214448 is a binary star system in the equatorial constellation of Aquarius. They orbit each other with a period of around 147 years. The combined mass of the pair is twice that of the Sun.
