= HD 222093 =

Double star system in the constellation Aquarius

Observation data Epoch J2000 Equinox J2000
- Constellation: Aquarius
- Right ascension: 23^{h} 37^{m} 39.56021^{s}
- Declination: −13° 03′ 36.8732″
- Apparent magnitude (V): 5.68 + 9.6 or 11.19

Characteristics
- Evolutionary stage: red clump
- Spectral type: K0III
- U−B color index: +0.81
- B−V color index: +0.99

Astrometry
Radial velocity (R_{v})	−12.56±0.15 km/s
Proper motion (μ)	RA: +34.676 mas/yr Dec.: +26.758 mas/yr
Parallax (π)	11.1185±0.1442 mas
Distance	293 ± 4 ly (90 ± 1 pc)
Absolute magnitude (M_{V})	+1.1

Details
Mass	1.51 M_{☉}
Radius	10.00+0.47 −1.06 R_{☉}
Luminosity	50.0±0.8 L_{☉}
Surface gravity (log g)	2.7 cgs
Temperature	4,853+279 −110 K
Metallicity [Fe/H]	−0.25 dex
Rotational velocity (v sin i)	0.0 km/s
Age	3.17 Gyr

Other designations
- BD−13°6439, HD 222093, HIP 116591, HR 8958, SAO 165804

Database references

HD 222093
SIMBAD	data

ADS 16878
SIMBAD	data

HD 222093 is a double star in the equatorial constellation of Aquarius. It has an orange hue and is visible to the naked eye with an apparent visual magnitude of 5.68. The system is located at a distance of approximately 293 light years from the Sun based on parallax, but is drifting closer with a radial velocity of −13 km/s.

The primary component is an aging K-type giant star with a stellar classification of K0III, which indicates it has exhausted the supply of hydrogen at its core then cooled and expanded. At present it has ten times the Sun's radius. This is a red clump giant, which indicates it is on the horizontal branch and is generating energy through helium fusion at its core. It is around three billion years old with 1.5 times the mass of the Sun. The star is radiating fifty times the Sun's luminosity from its swollen photosphere at an effective temperature of 4,853 K.

According to Eggleton and Tokovinin (2008), this is most likely a wide binary star system; the secondary companion is a magnitude 9.6 star at an angular separation of 33.1″ from the primary. However, the Washington Visual Double Star Catalog gives a magnitude of 11.19 with an angular separation of 30.2″.
