= HD 222582 =

Multiple star system in the constellation Aquarius

Observation data Epoch J2000 Equinox ICRS
- Constellation: Aquarius
- Right ascension: 23^{h} 41^{m} 51.5301^{s}
- Declination: −05° 59′ 08.729″
- Apparent magnitude (V): 7.685±0.005

Characteristics

HD 222582A
- Evolutionary stage: Main sequence
- Spectral type: G5V
- B−V color index: 0.648±0.002

HD 222582B
- Spectral type: M4.5V

Astrometry

A
Radial velocity (R_{v})	+12.020±0.0004 km/s
Proper motion (μ)	RA: −145.492(29) mas/yr Dec.: −111.458(21) mas/yr
Parallax (π)	23.7955±0.0238 mas
Distance	137.1 ± 0.1 ly (42.02 ± 0.04 pc)
Absolute magnitude (M_{V})	4.44±0.12

Position (relative to HD 222582A)
Component	HD 222582B
Epoch of observation	2018
Angular distance	109.56±0.18″
Position angle	299.52±0.03°
Projected separation	4637±59 AU AU

Details

A
Mass	0.993±0.035 M_{☉}
Radius	1.137±0.017 R_{☉}
Luminosity	1.302+0.005 −0.004 L_{☉}
Surface gravity (log g)	4.370±0.009 cgs
Temperature	5,790±3 K
Metallicity [Fe/H]	−0.005±0.003 dex
Rotational velocity (v sin i)	1.74±0.12 km/s
Age	6.7±0.3 Gyr

Ba+Bb
Mass	0.2 M_{☉}

Other designations
- BD−06°6262, GC 32912, HD 222582, HIP 116906, SAO 146849, WDS J23419-0559A, NLTT 57682, 2MASS J23415154-0559086

Database references
SIMBAD	data
- Planet
HD 222582 b	Data Simbad
- Data ExoPlanet

HD 222582 is a multiple star system in the equatorial constellation of Aquarius. It is invisible to the naked eye with an apparent visual magnitude of 7.7, but can be viewed with binoculars or a small telescope. The system is located at a distance of 137 light years from the Sun based on parallax, and it is drifting further away with a radial velocity of +12 km/s. It is located close enough to the ecliptic that it is subject to lunar occultations.

== Star system ==
The primary member of this system, designated component A, is an ordinary G-type main-sequence star with a stellar classification of G5V. The physical properties of the star are similar enough to the Sun that it is considered a candidate solar twin. It is about 6.5 billion years old with an inactive chromosphere and is spinning with a low projected rotational velocity of 1.7 km/s. The mass and metallicity of this star are essentially the same as the Sun. It has a 14% larger radius and is radiating 1.3 times the luminosity of the Sun from its photosphere at an effective temperature of 5,790 K.

Component B of this system is a close binary system with the components designated HD 222582 Ba and Bb. The pair have a combined class of M4.5 V+ and about 20% the mass of the Sun.

== Planetary system ==
In November 1999, a dense superjovian planet was announced orbiting the primary by the California and Carnegie Planet Search. Designated component 'b', it was discovered using the radial velocity method, using 24 observations over a period of 1.5 years. The exoplanet is orbiting with a period of 1.57 years and a very large eccentricity of 0.76, ranging in distance from 0.39 AU out to 2.31 AU away from the primary.

The HD 222582 planetary system
Companion (in order from star)	Mass	Semimajor axis (AU)	Orbital period (days)	Eccentricity	Inclination (°)	Radius
b	8.37 M_{J}	1.35	572	0.76	—	—

== See also ==
- HD 224693
- List of exoplanets discovered before 2000 - HD 222582 b
