= HD 210277 =

Star in the constellation Aquarius

Observation data Epoch J2000 Equinox ICRS
- Constellation: Aquarius
- Right ascension: 22^{h} 09^{m} 29.8658^{s}
- Declination: −07° 32′ 55.162″
- Apparent magnitude (V): 6.54

Characteristics
- Evolutionary stage: main sequence
- Spectral type: G8V or G8/K0V
- U−B color index: 0.36
- B−V color index: 0.75

Astrometry
Radial velocity (R_{v})	−20.855±0.0003 km/s
Proper motion (μ)	RA: 85.407(29) mas/yr Dec.: −450.617(23) mas/yr
Parallax (π)	46.8515±0.0283 mas
Distance	69.61 ± 0.04 ly (21.34 ± 0.01 pc)
Absolute magnitude (M_{V})	4.90±0.05

Details
Mass	1.007+0.040 −0.039 M_{☉}
Radius	1.087+0.015 −0.016 R_{☉}
Luminosity	1.002 L_{☉}
Surface gravity (log g)	4.369±0.020 cgs
Temperature	5,705±35 K
Metallicity [Fe/H]	0.170±0.097 dex
Rotation	40.8 d
Rotational velocity (v sin i)	1.888±0.158 km/s
Age	6.471+1.744 −1.643 Gyr; 8.929±2.671 Gyr

Other designations
- BD−08°5818, GJ 848.4, GJ 9769, HD 210277, HIP 109378, SAO 145906, PPM 206033, LTT 8887, NLTT 53073, GCRV 13920, 2MASS J22092985-0732548

Database references
SIMBAD	data
ARICNS	data

HD 210277 is a single star in the equatorial constellation of Aquarius. It has an apparent visual magnitude of 6.54, which makes it a challenge to view with the naked eye, but it is easily visible in binoculars. The star is located at a distance of 69.6 light years from the Sun based on parallax, but is drifting closer with a radial velocity of −20.9 km/s.

== Description ==
An early classification of HD 210277 was a G0 dwarf, and some sources still use this value. More modern classification surveys list it as G8V, matching a late G-type main-sequence star. It is older than the Sun with a very low level of chromospheric activity and is spinning with a projected rotational velocity of 1.9 km/s. The star has a slightly higher mass and larger radius than the Sun.

== Planetary system ==
In 1999 it was announced that a dust disk orbiting HD 210277, similar to that produced by the Kuiper Belt, had been imaged, lying between 30 and 62 AU from the star. However, observations with the Spitzer Space Telescope failed to detect any infrared excess at 70 micrometres or at 24 micrometres wavelengths. Subsequent measurements by the Herschel Space Observatory did detect an excess at 100 and 160 micrometres. A model fit to the emission matches a disk orbiting at 160 AU with a mean temperature of 22 K. The disk signal is fairly strong, with S/N equal to 6.6.

The only known exoplanet was discovered using 34 radial velocity measurements taken from 1996 to 1998 at W. M. Keck Observatory. It has a minimum mass greater than Jupiter orbiting the star in 442 days. The high eccentricity (ovalness) of the exoplanet's orbit means it is unlikely that there is a companion planet co-orbiting the star at a trojan point.

The HD 210277 planetary system
Companion (in order from star)	Mass	Semimajor axis (AU)	Orbital period (days)	Eccentricity	Inclination (°)	Radius
b	>1.29±0.11 M_{J}	1.138±0.066	442.19±0.50	0.476±0.017	—	—
debris disk	160 AU				—	—

== See also ==
- List of exoplanets discovered before 2000 - HD 210277 b
