= HD 199442 =

Star in the constellation Aquarius

Observation data Epoch J2000 Equinox ICRS
- Constellation: Aquarius
- Right ascension: 20^{h} 57^{m} 10.57748^{s}
- Declination: +00° 27′ 49.6076″
- Apparent magnitude (V): 6.065

Characteristics
- Evolutionary stage: red giant branch
- Spectral type: K2III
- U−B color index: +1.29
- B−V color index: +1.22

Astrometry
Radial velocity (R_{v})	−26.47 km/s
Proper motion (μ)	RA: +12.078 mas/yr Dec.: −62.766 mas/yr
Parallax (π)	10.0850±0.0398 mas
Distance	323 ± 1 ly (99.2 ± 0.4 pc)
Absolute magnitude (M_{V})	+1.2

Details
Mass	1.4 M_{☉}
Radius	11.5 R_{☉}
Luminosity	48 L_{☉}
Surface gravity (log g)	2.44 cgs
Temperature	4,625 K
Metallicity [Fe/H]	0.01 dex
Rotational velocity (v sin i)	2.7 km/s
Age	4.5 Gyr

Other designations
- ADS 14457 A, BD−00°4132, HIP 103414, HR 8017, SAO 126396

Database references
SIMBAD	data

HD 199442 is a giant star situated in the constellation Aquarius. It is located about 323 light years from the Solar System.
