= HD 219659 =

Suspected variable star in the constellation Aquarius

Observation data Epoch J2000 Equinox ICRS
- Constellation: Aquarius
- Right ascension: 23^{h} 17^{m} 40.08278^{s}
- Declination: −11° 42′ 46.5910″
- Apparent magnitude (V): 6.33

Characteristics
- Evolutionary stage: main sequence
- Spectral type: A1/A2IV/V
- U−B color index: +0.00
- B−V color index: +0.05

Astrometry
Radial velocity (R_{v})	2.2 km/s
Proper motion (μ)	RA: +40.58 mas/yr Dec.: +5.32 mas/yr
Parallax (π)	8.24±0.53 mas
Distance	400 ± 30 ly (121 ± 8 pc)
Absolute magnitude (M_{V})	+0.92

Details
Mass	2.5 M_{☉}
Radius	3.0 R_{☉}
Luminosity	72 L_{☉}
Surface gravity (log g)	3.87 cgs
Temperature	9,661 K
Metallicity [Fe/H]	−0.01 dex
Rotational velocity (v sin i)	196 km/s
Age	462 Myr

Other designations
- BD−12°6461, HD 219659, HIP 115015, HR 8856, SAO 165609.

Database references
SIMBAD	data

HD 219659 is suspected variable star in the equatorial constellation of Aquarius.
