= HD 218061 =

Orange giant star in the constellation Aquarius

Observation data Epoch J2000 Equinox ICRS
- Constellation: Aquarius
- Right ascension: 23^{h} 05^{m} 12.854^{s}
- Declination: −17° 04′ 45.28″
- Apparent magnitude (V): 6.14

Characteristics
- Evolutionary stage: red giant branch
- Spectral type: K4III

Astrometry
Radial velocity (R_{v})	14.67±0.17 km/s
Proper motion (μ)	RA: −40.851 mas/yr Dec.: −37.904 mas/yr
Parallax (π)	5.2458±0.0418 mas
Distance	622 ± 5 ly (191 ± 2 pc)
Absolute magnitude (M_{V})	−0.31

Details
Mass	1.8 M_{☉}
Radius	25 R_{☉}
Luminosity	196 L_{☉}
Surface gravity (log g)	1.50 cgs
Temperature	4,291 K
Metallicity [Fe/H]	−0.20 dex
Age	1.6 Gyr

Other designations
- BD−17°6661, HD 218061, HIP 113998, HR 8783, SAO 165481

Database references
SIMBAD	data

HD 218061 is a class K4III (orange giant) star in the constellation Aquarius. Its apparent magnitude is 6.14 and it is approximately 622 light years away based on parallax.

It has a companion B of apparent magnitude 11.4 and separation 55.1".
