= HD 210277 b =

Extrasolar planet orbiting HD 210277

Discovery
- Discovered by: Marcy et al.
- Discovery site: California and Carnegie Planet Search; USA
- Discovery date: 9 Sept 1998
- Detection method: Radial velocity

Orbital characteristics
- Semi-major axis: 1.138 ± 0.066 AU (170,200,000 ± 9,900,000 km)
- Eccentricity: 0.476 ± 0.017
- Orbital period (sidereal): 442.19 ± 0.50 d
- Time of periastron: 2,450,104.3 ± 2.6
- Argument of periastron: 119.1 ± 2.8
- Semi-amplitude: 38.94 ± 0.75
- Star: HD 210277

HD 210277 b is an extrasolar planet orbiting the star HD 210277. It was discovered in September 1998 by the California and Carnegie Planet Search team using the highly successful radial velocity method. The planet is at least 24% more massive than Jupiter. The mean distance of the planet from the star is slightly more than Earth's distance from the Sun. However, the orbit is very eccentric, so at periastron this distance is almost halved, and at apastron it is as distant as Mars is from the Sun.

In 2000, a group of scientists proposed, based on preliminary data from the Hipparcos astrometrical satellite, that the planet would have an inclination of 175.8° and a true mass of 18 times Jupiter making it a brown dwarf instead of a planet. However these measurements were later proved useful only for upper limits of inclination. If the planet orbits in the same plane as the claimed circumstellar disk, which seems a plausible assumption, it would have an inclination of 40° and an absolute mass of 2.2 times Jupiter, however later observations failed to confirm the disk's existence.

== See also ==
- List of exoplanets discovered before 2000
