= 81 Aquarii =

Star in the constellation Aquarius

Observation data Epoch J2000 Equinox ICRS
- Constellation: Aquarius
- Right ascension: 23^{h} 01^{m} 23.64174^{s}
- Declination: −07° 03′ 40.1556″
- Apparent magnitude (V): 6.23

Characteristics
- Spectral type: K5 III
- B−V color index: 1.418±0.005

Astrometry
Radial velocity (R_{v})	+1.59±0.14 km/s
Proper motion (μ)	RA: −16.221±0.139 mas/yr Dec.: −7.911±0.087 mas/yr
Parallax (π)	7.2372±0.0691 mas
Distance	451 ± 4 ly (138 ± 1 pc)
Absolute magnitude (M_{V})	0.34

Details
Radius	18.02+1.36 −2.45 R_{☉}
Luminosity	102.3+1.3 −0.6 L_{☉}
Temperature	4,324+329 −154 K

Other designations
- 81 Aqr, BD−07°5910, HD 217531, HIP 113674, HR 8757, SAO 146447

Database references
SIMBAD	data

81 Aquarii is a star in the constellation of Aquarius. It has an orange hue and is barely visible to the naked eye with an apparent visual magnitude of 6.23. 81 Aquarii is its Flamsteed designation. The star is located at a distance of approximately 451 light years from the Sun based on parallax, and is drifting further away with a radial velocity of +1.6 km/s. It is positioned near the ecliptic and thus is subject to lunar occultations.

This is an aging giant star with a stellar classification of K5 III, indicating it has exhausted the supply of hydrogen at its core then cooled and expanded off the main sequence. The stellar spectrum displays strong lines of cyanogen. It presently has 18 times the radius of the Sun and is radiating 102 times the Sun's luminosity from its enlarged photosphere at an effective temperature of 4,324 K.
