= 30 Aquarii =

Star in the constellation Aquarius

Observation data Epoch J2000.0 Equinox ICRS
- Constellation: Aquarius
- Right ascension: 22^{h} 03^{m} 16.45803^{s}
- Declination: −06° 31′ 20.6748″
- Apparent magnitude (V): 5.558

Characteristics
- Evolutionary stage: red clump
- Spectral type: K1 IV or G8 III
- B−V color index: 0.951
- Variable type: Constant

Astrometry
Radial velocity (R_{v})	39.74 km/s
Proper motion (μ)	RA: +45.635 mas/yr Dec.: +8.681 mas/yr
Parallax (π)	10.8432±0.3325 mas
Distance	301 ± 9 ly (92 ± 3 pc)
Absolute magnitude (M_{V})	0.88

Details
Mass	2.01 M_{☉}
Radius	9.86+0.23 −0.25 R_{☉}
Luminosity	54.7±1.9 L_{☉}
Surface gravity (log g)	2.860 cgs
Temperature	4,944±79 K
Metallicity [Fe/H]	−0.11 dex
Rotational velocity (v sin i)	1.6 km/s
Age	1.98 Gyr

Other designations
- 30 Aqr, BD−07°5688, HD 209396, HIP 108868, HR 8401, SAO 145836

Database references
SIMBAD	data

30 Aquarii is a single star located about 301 light years away from the Sun in the zodiac constellation of Aquarius. 30 Aquarii is its Flamsteed designation. It is visible to the naked eye as a dim, orange-hued star with an apparent visual magnitude of 5.56. The star is moving further from the Earth with a heliocentric radial velocity of 40 km/s.

This object is an aging G-type giant star with a stellar classification of G8 III, although Houk and Swift (1999) found a class of K1 IV. It is a red clump giant, which indicates it is on the horizontal branch and is generating energy through helium fusion at its core. The star is nearly two billion years old with a leisurely rotation rate, showing a projected rotational velocity of 1.6 km/s. It has double the mass of the Sun and has expanded to ten times the Sun's radius. The star is radiating 55 times the luminosity of the Sun from its swollen photosphere at an effective temperature of 4,944 K.
