= HD 205765 =

Star in the constellation Aquarius

Observation data Epoch J2000 Equinox ICRS
- Constellation: Aquarius
- Right ascension: 21^{h} 37^{m} 33.76260^{s}
- Declination: −00° 23′ 26.0225″
- Apparent magnitude (V): 6.22

Characteristics
- Evolutionary stage: main sequence
- Spectral type: A2V
- U−B color index: +0.055
- B−V color index: +0.055

Astrometry
Radial velocity (R_{v})	+16.9 km/s
Proper motion (μ)	RA: −31.305 mas/yr Dec.: −28.242 mas/yr
Parallax (π)	8.8688±0.0445 mas
Distance	368 ± 2 ly (112.8 ± 0.6 pc)
Absolute magnitude (M_{V})	+0.96

Details
Mass	2.3 M_{☉}
Radius	2.4 R_{☉}
Luminosity	43 L_{☉}
Temperature	8,954 K
Metallicity [Fe/H]	−0.17 dex
Rotational velocity (v sin i)	191 km/s
Age	476 Myr

Other designations
- BD−01°4180, HD 205765, HIP 106758, HR 8263, SAO 145533.

Database references
SIMBAD	data

HD 205765 is a star in the equatorial constellation of Aquarius. It is an A-type main sequence star with an apparent magnitude of 6.2, which, according to the Bortle scale, makes it faintly visible to the naked eye from dark rural skies. This star is spinning rapidly with a projected rotational velocity of 172 km/s.

The Washington Double Star Catalog lists a 9th-magnitude companion at 31″ and a 14th-magnitude companion at 38″. The brighter and closer star shares a common proper motion and distance with HD 205765, while the fainter and more widely-separated star has a much smaller parallax.
