= FO Aquarii =

Variable star system in constellation Aquarius

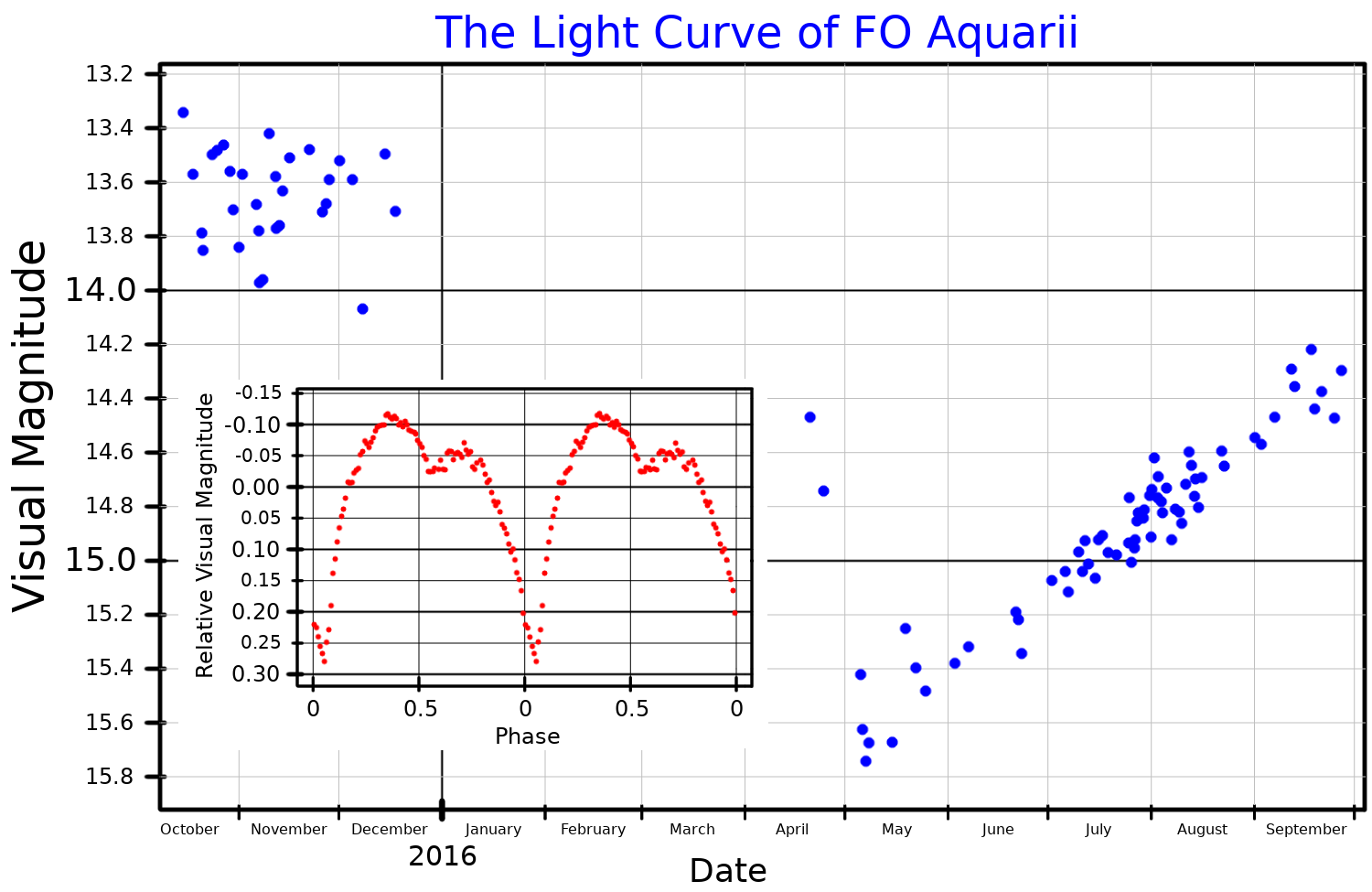
- The visual band light curve of FO Aquarii. The main plot shows the dimming which occurred in 2016, and the inset plot shows the short-term variation that occurs during an orbital period. Adapted from Littlefield et al. (2016)

Observation data Epoch J2000 Equinox J2000
- Constellation: Aquarius
- Right ascension: 22^{h} 17^{m} 55.38^{s}
- Declination: −08° 21′ 04.6″
- Apparent magnitude (V): 12.7

Characteristics
- Evolutionary stage: White dwarf
- Apparent magnitude (B): 13.70
- Apparent magnitude (R): 13.60
- Apparent magnitude (J): 12.87
- Apparent magnitude (H): 12.75
- Apparent magnitude (K): 12.51
- Variable type: DQ Her

Astrometry
Parallax (π)	1.8416±0.0281 mas
Distance	1,770 ± 30 ly (543 ± 8 pc)

Orbit
Period (P)	4.85 hr

Other designations
- 2E 4588, 1RXS J221753.9-082115, CS 22886-0021, H 2215-086

Database references
SIMBAD	data

FO Aquarii is an intermediate polar star system in the constellation Aquarius. The white dwarf and companion star orbit each other with a period of approximately 4.85 hours. The system is famous for a very strong optical pulsation which occurs every 20.9 minutes, corresponding with the rotational period of the accreting white dwarf. Prior to 2016, the system's long-term optical brightness varied between apparent magnitude 12.7 and 14.2, but in early 2016, it faded to magnitude 15.8 and thereafter began a slow recovery to its normal brightness, behavior which is indicative of a temporary dropoff in the mass-transfer rate between the two stars.

The variable nature of FO Aquarii was discovered in 1983 by Joseph Patterson and João Evangelista Steiner. It was given its variable star designation in 1985.
