= HD 220035 =

Star in the constellation Aquarius

Observation data Epoch J2000 Equinox ICRS
- Constellation: Aquarius
- Right ascension: 23^{h} 20^{m} 40.88873^{s}
- Declination: −05° 54′ 28.6987″
- Apparent magnitude (V): 6.17

Characteristics
- Evolutionary stage: red giant branch
- Spectral type: K0III
- U−B color index: +0.97
- B−V color index: +1.07
- Variable type: suspected

Astrometry
Radial velocity (R_{v})	-1.9 km/s
Proper motion (μ)	RA: -100.38 mas/yr Dec.: -58.84 mas/yr
Parallax (π)	8.84±0.52 mas
Distance	370 ± 20 ly (113 ± 7 pc)
Absolute magnitude (M_{V})	+0.91

Details
Mass	1.2 M_{☉}
Radius	13 R_{☉}
Luminosity	62 L_{☉}
Temperature	4,590 K
Metallicity [Fe/H]	−0.35 dex
Rotational velocity (v sin i)	<1.6 km/s
Age	6.8 Gyr

Other designations
- BD−06°6191, HD 220035, HIP 115257, HR 8879, SAO 146652

Database references
SIMBAD	data

HD 220035 is suspected variable star in the equatorial constellation of Aquarius.
