= 32 Aquarii =

Binary star system in the constellation Aquarius

Observation data Epoch J2000.0 Equinox ICRS
- Constellation: Aquarius
- Right ascension: 22^{h} 04^{m} 47.42197^{s}
- Declination: −00° 54′ 22.8469″
- Apparent magnitude (V): 5.29

Characteristics
- Evolutionary stage: main sequence
- Spectral type: A5 IV or Am (A5/A9V/F2)
- B−V color index: 0.231±0.004

Astrometry
Radial velocity (R_{v})	18.9±4.2 km/s
Proper motion (μ)	RA: −19.69 mas/yr Dec.: −42.15 mas/yr
Parallax (π)	14.4329±0.1784 mas
Distance	226 ± 3 ly (69.3 ± 0.9 pc)
Absolute magnitude (M_{V})	1.12

Orbit
Period (P)	7.83238±0.00002 d
Eccentricity (e)	0
Periastron epoch (T)	53,420.2304±0.0001 HJD
Argument of periastron (ω) (secondary)	0°
Semi-amplitude (K_{1}) (primary)	7.2150±0.4 km/s

Details
Mass	1.69 M_{☉}
Radius	2.97+0.17 −0.07 R_{☉}
Luminosity	29.4±0.4 L_{☉}
Surface gravity (log g)	4.11 cgs
Temperature	7,976±271 K
Metallicity [Fe/H]	0.26±0.12 dex
Rotational velocity (v sin i)	9.6 km/s
Age	465 Myr

Other designations
- 32 Aqr, BD−01°4242, HD 209625, HIP 108991, HR 8410, SAO 145853

Database references
SIMBAD	data

32 Aquarii is a binary star system in the zodiac constellation of Aquarius. 32 Aquarii is its Flamsteed designation. It is visible to the naked eye as a dim, white-hued star with an apparent visual magnitude of 5.29. This system is moving away from the Earth with a heliocentric radial velocity of +19 km/s, and is a possible member of the corona of the Ursa Major flow.

This is a single-lined spectroscopic binary with an (assumed) circular orbit having a period of only 7.8 days. It has an a sin i value of 0.777 Gm (0.00519 AU), where a is the semimajor axis and i is the orbital inclination. Since the sine function can be no larger than one, this provides a lower bound on the true semimajor axis of their orbit.

The primary component is a metallic-line (Am) star with the calcium K line of an A3 star, the hydrogen lines of an F1 star, and the metal lines of an F2 star. It is a sharp-lined, slowly rotating star with a projected rotational velocity of 9.6 km/s and is about 465 million years old. The star has 1.69 times the mass of the Sun and three times the Sun's radius. It is radiating 29 times the luminosity of the Sun from its photosphere at an effective temperature of 7,976 K.
