= HD 220689 =

Star in the constellation Aquarius

Observation data Epoch J2000.0 Equinox ICRS
- Constellation: Aquarius
- Right ascension: 23^{h} 25^{m} 52.99170^{s}
- Declination: −20° 36′ 57.6998″
- Apparent magnitude (V): +7.74

Characteristics
- Evolutionary stage: main sequence
- Spectral type: G3V
- B−V color index: +0.603±0.002

Astrometry
Radial velocity (R_{v})	+12.30±0.14 km/s
Proper motion (μ)	RA: −15.328 mas/yr Dec.: −177.593 mas/yr
Parallax (π)	21.3074±0.0236 mas
Distance	153.1 ± 0.2 ly (46.93 ± 0.05 pc)
Absolute magnitude (M_{V})	4.50

Details
Mass	1.016±0.048 M_{☉}
Radius	1.068±0.047 R_{☉}
Luminosity	1.491±0.005 L_{☉}
Surface gravity (log g)	4.360±0.045 cgs
Temperature	5,921±26 K
Metallicity [Fe/H]	−0.07±0.10 dex
Rotation	~29 d
Rotational velocity (v sin i)	5.5 km/s
Age	4.586±2.487 Gyr

Other designations
- BD−21°6419, GC 32591, HD 220689, HIP 115662, SAO 191898, G 273-43

Database references
SIMBAD	data
Exoplanet Archive	data

HD 220689 is a single star in the equatorial constellation of Aquarius. It is a challenge to view with the naked eye, having an apparent visual magnitude of +7.74, but is readily viewed with a pair of binoculars. The star is located at a distance of 153 light years from the Sun based on parallax, and is drifting further away with a radial velocity of +12 km/s. A survey in 2015 has ruled out the existence of any additional stellar companions at projected distances from 26 to 305 astronomical units.

The stellar classification of HD 220689 is G3V, matching a yellow hued G-type main-sequence star that is generating energy through core hydrogen fusion. It is roughly 4.6 billion years old and is spinning with a projected rotational velocity of 5.5 km/s, giving it a rotation period of around 29 days. The star has a similar size, mass, and elemental abundances as the Sun. It is radiating 1.5 times the luminosity of the Sun from its photosphere at an effective temperature of 5,921 K.

== Planetary system ==
From 1998 to 2012, the star was under observation from the CORALIE echelle spectrograph at La Silla Observatory. In 2012, a long-period, wide-orbiting exoplanet was deduced from radial velocity variations. This was published in November. The maximum orbital period allowing for dynamic stability of a hypothetical inner planet is 3.9 years. In 2023, the inclination and true mass of HD 220689 b were determined via astrometry.

The HD 220689 planetary system
Companion (in order from star)	Mass	Semimajor axis (AU)	Orbital period (years)	Eccentricity	Inclination (°)	Radius
b	1.2+0.22 −0.11 M_{J}	3.433+0.065 −0.064	6.23+0.15 −0.14	0.053+0.06 −0.037	71+13 −18 or 109+18 −13	—
