= EW Aquarii =

Variable star in the constellation Aquarius

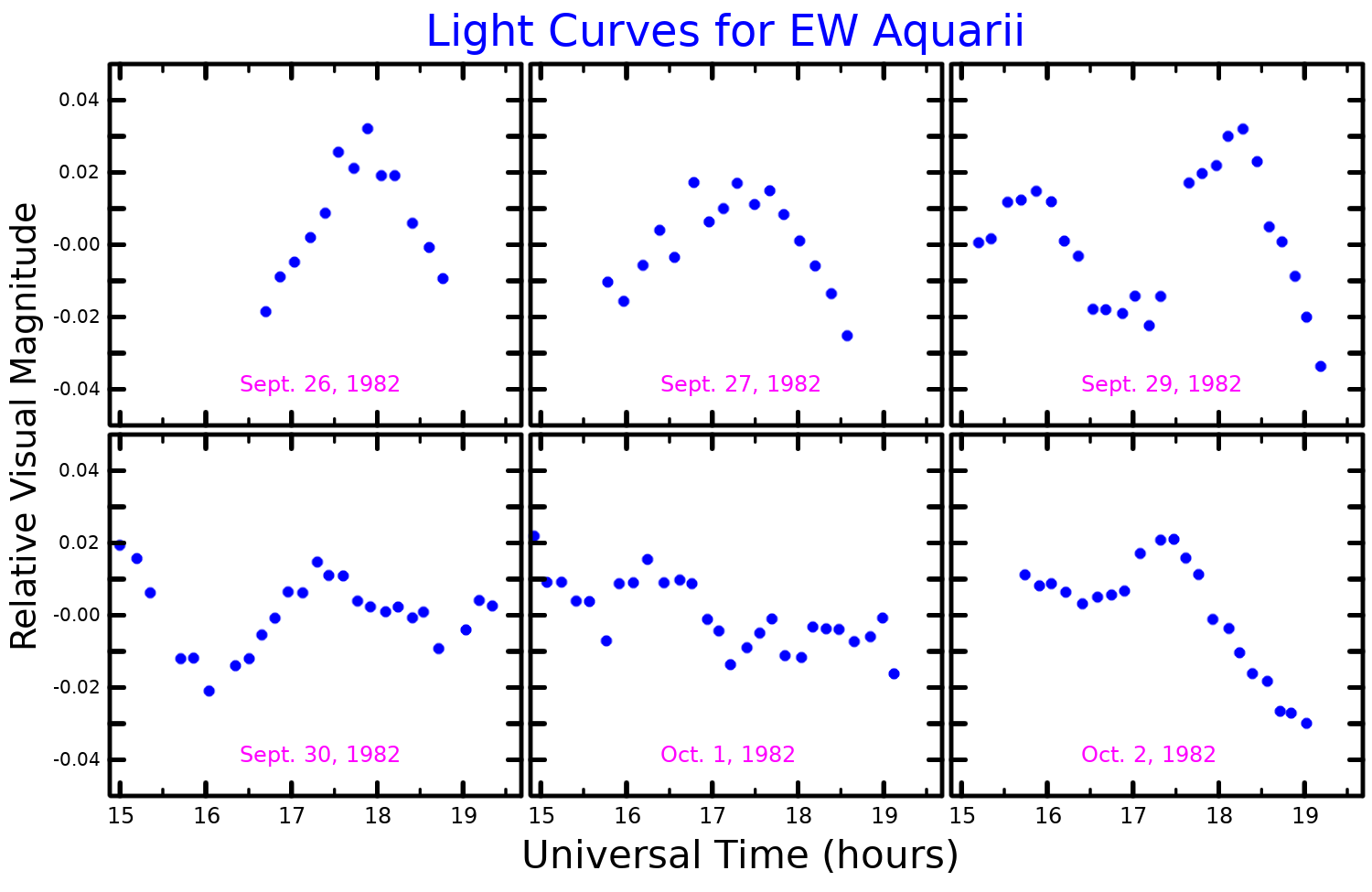
- Six visual band light curves of for EW Aquarii, adapted from Hobart et al. (1989)

Observation data Epoch J2000 Equinox ICRS
- Constellation: Aquarius
- Right ascension: 21^{h} 11^{m} 41.33844^{s}
- Declination: −14° 28′ 20.5590″
- Apparent magnitude (V): 6.41 - 6.48

Characteristics
- Spectral type: A8 III or Fm δ Del
- U−B color index: 0.15
- B−V color index: 0.316±0.007
- Variable type: δ Sct

Astrometry
Radial velocity (R_{v})	−39.2±2.9 km/s
Proper motion (μ)	RA: +39.263 mas/yr Dec.: +0.614 mas/yr
Parallax (π)	7.4366±0.0435 mas
Distance	439 ± 3 ly (134.5 ± 0.8 pc)
Absolute magnitude (M_{V})	0.825

Details
Mass	2.203 M_{☉}
Radius	3.99±0.20 R_{☉}
Luminosity	37.026±0.314 L_{☉}
Surface gravity (log g)	3.91 cgs
Temperature	7,640 K
Rotational velocity (v sin i)	134 km/s

Other designations
- BD−15°5908, FK5 5868, HD 201707, HIP 104634, HR 8102, SAO 164204

Database references
SIMBAD	data

EW Aquarii, or HR 8102, is a variable star in the equatorial constellation of Aquarius. With an apparent visual magnitude that fluctuates near 6.4, it is a dim star near the lower limit of visibility to the naked eye. The star is located at a distance of approximately 439 light years from the Sun based on parallax, but is drifting closer with a radial velocity of −39 km/s. The star is positioned near the ecliptic and thus is subject to lunar occultations. It may be a member of the Hyades Group.

In 1969, HR 8102 was flagged as a suspected metal-lined Delta Delphini star and was catalogued as such. During a search for ultra-short period Cepheid variables in 1974, this star was found to vary in brightness and was determined to be a low amplitude Delta Scuti variable. In 1977, it was catalogued in the 62nd name-list of variable stars with the designation EW Aqr. The star varies between magnitudes 6.41 and 6.48 with a primary period of 2.16 hours. There are three known variation periods of 0.09664, 0.1087, and 0.2121 days with amplitudes of 0.013, 0.010, and 0.007 magnitudes, respectively. The pattern of variations indicate it is a non-radial pulsator.

The stellar classification of EW Aqr is Fm δ Del, indicating an F-type Am star of the Delta Delphini type. It has 2.2 times the mass of the Sun and four times the Sun's radius. The star has a high rate of spin, showing a projected rotational velocity of 134 km/s. On average, it is radiating 37 times the luminosity of the Sun from its photosphere at an effective temperature of 7,640 K.
