= 39 Aquarii =

Star in the constellation Aquarius

Observation data Epoch J2000 Equinox ICRS
- Constellation: Aquarius
- Right ascension: 22^{h} 12^{m} 25.76398^{s}
- Declination: −14° 11′ 38.3009″
- Apparent magnitude (V): 6.03

Characteristics
- Evolutionary stage: main sequence
- Spectral type: F0 V
- U−B color index: +0.00
- B−V color index: +0.38

Astrometry
Radial velocity (R_{v})	+15.2 km/s
Proper motion (μ)	RA: +23.89 mas/yr Dec.: -47.43 mas/yr
Parallax (π)	22.5378±0.1723 mas
Distance	145 ± 1 ly (44.4 ± 0.3 pc)
Absolute magnitude (M_{V})	2.92

Details
Mass	1.35 M_{☉}
Radius	1.79+0.04 −0.10 R_{☉}
Luminosity	6.109±0.054 L_{☉}
Surface gravity (log g)	3.99 cgs
Temperature	6,806 K
Metallicity [Fe/H]	–0.21 dex
Age	1.8 Gyr

Other designations
- 39 Aqr, BD−14°6229, HD 210705, HIP 109624, HR 8462, SAO 164923

Database references
SIMBAD	data

39 Aquarii is a star in the zodiac constellation of Aquarius. 39 Aquarii is its Flamsteed designation. It is a faint naked eye star with an apparent visual magnitude of 6.03. Based upon an annual parallax shift of 23.78 measured with a 3% margin of error, this star is at a distance of around 137 light-years (42 parsecs) from Earth. It is a double star with a magnitude 9.3 companion at an angular separation of 0.6 arcseconds along a position angle of 257°.

The stellar classification of this star is F0 V; hence it belongs to the category of F-type main sequence stars that generate energy through hydrogen fusion at the core. It is 1.8 billion years old with 1.35 times the mass of the Sun and 1.79 times the Sun's radius. The star is radiating 6.1 times the luminosity of the Sun from its photosphere at an effective temperature of 6,806 K.
