= HD 213429 =

Binary star system in the constellation Aquarius

Observation data Epoch J2000 Equinox ICRS
- Constellation: Aquarius
- Right ascension: 22^{h} 31^{m} 18.31271^{s}
- Declination: −06° 33′ 18.5437″
- Apparent magnitude (V): 6.160

Characteristics
- Spectral type: F8V
- U−B color index: +0.03
- B−V color index: +0.55

Astrometry
Radial velocity (R_{v})	−9.9±6.3 km/s
Proper motion (μ)	RA: +161.61 mas/yr Dec.: −108.40 mas/yr
Parallax (π)	39.35±0.70 mas
Distance	83 ± 1 ly (25.4 ± 0.5 pc)
Absolute magnitude (M_{V})	4.13

Details

HD 213429 A
Mass	1.18 M_{☉}
Surface gravity (log g)	4.10 cgs
Temperature	6,001 K
Metallicity [Fe/H]	−0.23 dex
Rotational velocity (v sin i)	6 km/s
Age	3.7 Gyr

HD 213429 B
Mass	0.78 M_{☉}

Other designations
- BD−07°5797, HD 213429, HIP 111170, HR 8581, GJ 862.1, GJ 9786, LTT 9053, SAO 146135

Database references
SIMBAD	data

Data sources:

Hipparcos Catalogue, CCDM (2002), Bright Star Catalogue (5th rev. ed.)

HD 213429 is a spectroscopic binary system in the equatorial constellation of Aquarius. It has a combined apparent magnitude of 6.16 and is located around 83 light years away. The pair orbit each other with a period of 631 days, at an average separation of 1.74 AU and an eccentricity of 0.38.
