= 12 Aquarii =

Star system in the constellation Aquarius

Observation data Epoch J2000 Equinox J2000
- Constellation: Aquarius
- Right ascension: 21^{h} 04^{m} 04.72438^{s}
- Declination: −05° 49′ 23.0347″
- Apparent magnitude (V): 5.67 (5.88 + 7.55)

Characteristics
- Spectral type: K0/1 III + A3 V or G4 II + A3+ + (A4)

Astrometry
Radial velocity (R_{v})	+1.1±0.3 km/s
Proper motion (μ)	RA: +20.35 mas/yr Dec.: -6.67 mas/yr
Parallax (π)	6.50±0.88 mas
Distance	approx. 500 ly (approx. 150 pc)
Absolute magnitude (M_{V})	0.1 + 1.4 + 1.5

Details

12 Aqr Aa/Ab
Mass	2.6/2.0 M_{☉}
Temperature	5,012/8,511 K

12 Aqr B
Mass	1.9 M_{☉}
Temperature	8,318 K

Other designations
- 12 Aqr, BD−06°5664, HIP 103981, ADS 14592, CCDM J21041-0549AB, WDS J21041-0549AB
- 12 Aqr A: HD 200497, HR 8059, SAO 145065
- 12 Aqr B: HD 200496, HR 8058, SAO 145064

Database references
SIMBAD	12 Aqr
- 12 Aqr A
- 12 Aqr B

12 Aquarii is a triple star system in the zodiac constellation of Aquarius. 12 Aquarii is the Flamsteed designation. It is visible to the naked eye as a dim star with an apparent visual magnitude of 5.67. Parallax measurements by Hipparcos puts it at a distance of some 500 light-years, or 150 parsecs away. The system is moving further from the Earth with a heliocentric radial velocity of +1.1 km/s.

The magnitude 5.88 primary, component A, is itself a binary star with a separation of 0.05″–0.07″ and an orbital period of around 18.5 yr. The brighter member of this duo is a G-type bright giant with a stellar classification of G4 II and 2.6 times the mass of the Sun. Its companion is an early A-type star with double the mass of the Sun. The tertiary component B is magnitude 7.55 A-type main-sequence star at a separation of 2.44″ from the primary.
