= HD 200375 =

Binary star system in the constellation Aquarius

Observation data Epoch J2000 Equinox ICRS
- Constellation: Aquarius
- Right ascension: 21^{h} 03^{m} 03.02378^{s}
- Declination: +01° 31′ 55.4137″
- Apparent magnitude (V): 6.23

Characteristics
- Spectral type: F5/6V
- U−B color index: −0.01
- B−V color index: +0.47

Astrometry
Radial velocity (R_{v})	8.77±0.34 km/s
Proper motion (μ)	RA: −110.79 mas/yr Dec.: −53.84 mas/yr
Parallax (π)	14.12±0.64 mas
Distance	230 ± 10 ly (71 ± 3 pc)
Absolute magnitude (M_{V})	1.98

Orbit
Period (P)	840±380 yr
Semi-major axis (a)	1.84±0.42″
Eccentricity (e)	0.45±0.13
Inclination (i)	133±7°
Longitude of the node (Ω)	105±17°
Periastron epoch (T)	2076±15
Argument of periastron (ω) (secondary)	59±20°

Details

A
Mass	1.53 M_{☉}
Radius	2.9 R_{☉}
Luminosity	13 L_{☉}
Temperature	6,386 K

B
Mass	1.40 M_{☉}
Temperature	5,045 K

Other designations
- ADS 14573, BD+00°4648, HD 200375, HIP 103892, HR 8056, SAO 126491.
- A: TYC 526-1953-1
- B: TYC 526-1953-2

Database references
SIMBAD	data
- A
- B

Data sources:

Hipparcos Catalogue, CCDM (2002), Bright Star Catalogue (5th rev. ed.)

HD 200375 is a binary star system in the equatorial constellation of Aquarius.
