= 7 Aquarii =

Star in the constellation Aquarius

Observation data Epoch J2000 Equinox ICRS
- Constellation: Aquarius
- Right ascension: 20^{h} 56^{m} 54.02626^{s}
- Declination: −09° 41′ 51.1610″
- Apparent magnitude (V): 5.499 (5.62 + 11.4)

Characteristics
- Spectral type: K4 III
- B−V color index: +1.474±0.006
- Variable type: Suspected

Astrometry
Radial velocity (R_{v})	−32.4±1.6 km/s
Proper motion (μ)	RA: −5.577 mas/yr Dec.: −10.245 mas/yr
Parallax (π)	4.9495±0.1309 mas
Distance	660 ± 20 ly (202 ± 5 pc)
Absolute magnitude (M_{V})	−0.61

Details
Radius	46 R_{☉}
Luminosity	403.66 L_{☉}
Surface gravity (log g)	1.650 cgs
Temperature	3,990 K
Metallicity [Fe/H]	−0.17 dex

Other designations
- 7 Aqr, NSV 13419, BD−10°5553, HD 199345, HIP 103401, HR 8015, SAO 144968, ADS 14449, WDS J20569-0942

Database references
SIMBAD	data

7 Aquarii, abbreviated 7 Aqr, is a binary star system in the zodiac constellation of Aquarius. 7 Aquarii is the Flamsteed designation. It is visible to the naked eye with an apparent visual magnitude of 5.5; the brighter component is baseline magnitude 5.62 while the faint secondary is magnitude 11.4. As of 2002, the pair had an angular separation of 2.10″ along a position angle of 165°. The distance to this system, based upon an annual parallax shift of 4.9 mas, is around 660 light years. It is moving closer to the Earth with a heliocentric radial velocity of −32 km/s.

The primary component is an aging giant star with a stellar classification of K4 III. It is a suspected variable star of unknown type with a maximum magnitude of 5.48. The interferometry-measured angular diameter of this star, after correcting for limb darkening, is 2.14±0.02 mas, which, at its estimated distance, equates to a physical radius of about 46 times the radius of the Sun. The star is radiating 404 times the Sun's luminosity from its enlarged photosphere at an effective temperature of 3,990 K.
