= HD 221148 =

K-type suspected variable star in the constellation Aquarius

Observation data Epoch J2000 Equinox ICRS
- Constellation: Aquarius
- Right ascension: 23^{h} 29^{m} 32.08207^{s}
- Declination: −04° 31′ 57.8915″
- Apparent magnitude (V): 6.26

Characteristics
- Spectral type: K3IIIv
- U−B color index: +1.20
- B−V color index: +1.10

Astrometry
Radial velocity (R_{v})	−26.53±1.94 km/s
Proper motion (μ)	RA: +181.03 mas/yr Dec.: −232.23 mas/yr
Parallax (π)	21.14±0.56 mas
Distance	154 ± 4 ly (47 ± 1 pc)
Absolute magnitude (M_{V})	+2.89

Details
Radius	5 R_{☉}
Luminosity	8.9 L_{☉}
Surface gravity (log g)	3.1 cgs
Temperature	4,592 K
Metallicity [Fe/H]	+0.11 dex
Rotational velocity (v sin i)	2.2 km/s

Other designations
- BD−05°5999, FK5 3881, HD 221148, HIP 115953, HR 8924, LTT 9560, SAO 146736

Database references
SIMBAD	data

HD 221148 is suspected variable star in the equatorial constellation of Aquarius. The spectrum of the star shows exceptionally strong levels of CN; one of the highest cyanogen indices measured.
