= HD 211392 =

Suspected variable star in the constellation Aquarius

Observation data Epoch J2000 Equinox ICRS
- Constellation: Aquarius
- Right ascension: 22^{h} 16^{m} 52.56734^{s}
- Declination: −09° 02′ 24.1971″
- Apparent magnitude (V): 5.96

Characteristics
- Evolutionary stage: red giant branch
- Spectral type: K3III
- U−B color index: +1.14
- B−V color index: +1.16

Astrometry
Radial velocity (R_{v})	12.1 km/s
Proper motion (μ)	RA: −57.013 mas/yr Dec.: −10.167 mas/yr
Parallax (π)	9.4163±0.0629 mas
Distance	346 ± 2 ly (106.2 ± 0.7 pc)
Absolute magnitude (M_{V})	+0.54

Details
Mass	1.5 M_{☉}
Radius	13 R_{☉}
Luminosity	69 L_{☉}
Surface gravity (log g)	2.11 cgs
Temperature	4,540 K
Metallicity [Fe/H]	0.01 dex
Age	3.1 Gyr

Other designations
- BD−09°5948, HD 211392, HIP 110009, HR 8500, SAO 145992

Database references
SIMBAD	data

Data sources:

Hipparcos Catalogue, CCDM (2002), Bright Star Catalogue (5th rev. ed.)

HD 211392 is a suspected variable star in the equatorial constellation of Aquarius, positioned about 346 light-years away. With an apparent magnitude close to six, according to the Bortle scale it is just visible to the naked eye from dark, rural skies. It is a giant star with a stellar classification of K3III.
