= 96 Aquarii =

Star in the constellation Aquarius

Observation data Epoch J2000 Equinox ICRS
- Constellation: Aquarius
- Right ascension: 23^{h} 19^{m} 23.97754^{s}
- Declination: −05° 07′ 27.6485″
- Apparent magnitude (V): 5.56 + 10.92

Characteristics
- Spectral type: F4 V Fe−0.4 + M3 V
- B−V color index: 0.40/1.37

Astrometry
Radial velocity (R_{v})	−7.17±0.35 km/s
Proper motion (μ)	RA: +201.39 mas/yr Dec.: −18.13 mas/yr
Parallax (π)	29.27±0.67 mas
Distance	111 ± 3 ly (34.2 ± 0.8 pc)
Absolute magnitude (M_{V})	2.89

Orbit
Primary	Aab
Period (P)	21.2371±0.0020 d
Eccentricity (e)	0.60
Periastron epoch (T)	22478.56 ± 0.38 JHD
Argument of periastron (ω) (secondary)	314±7°
Semi-amplitude (K_{1}) (primary)	42.7±3.6 km/s

Orbit
Name	Bab
Period (P)	659.9±3.6 d
Eccentricity (e)	0.60
Periastron epoch (T)	51429.1 ± 7.2 JHD
Argument of periastron (ω) (secondary)	59.3±10.6°
Semi-amplitude (K_{1}) (primary)	8.49±1.05 km/s

Details

96 Aqr Aa
Mass	1.32 M_{☉}
Luminosity	5.82 L_{☉}
Surface gravity (log g)	4.21±0.14 cgs
Temperature	6,813±232 K
Metallicity [Fe/H]	−0.12±0.08 dex
Age	949 Myr

96 Aqr Ba
Mass	0.40 M_{☉}

Other designations
- 96 Aqr, BD−05°5966, HD 219877, HIP 115142, HR 8868, SAO 146639

Database references
SIMBAD	data

96 Aquarii is a multiple star system in the zodiac constellation of Aquarius. The designation is from the star catalogue of English astronomer John Flamsteed, first published in 1712. It is faintly visible to the naked eye with an apparent visual magnitude of 5.56. The estimated distance to this system, based upon an annual parallax shift of 29.27 mas, is around 111 light years. The system has a relatively large proper motion and it is moving closer to the Sun with a radial velocity of −7 km/s.

The visible components, A and B, have an angular separation of 9.8 arc seconds and share a common proper motion. Their presumed orbital period is estimated as 4,400 years. Component A was first identified as a single-lined spectroscopic binary by Adams et al. (1924) at the Mount Wilson Observatory. It has an orbital period of 21.2 days with an eccentricity of 0.60. The Aab pair have an angular separation of 6 mas and a combined stellar classification of F4 V Fe−0.4, matching an F-type main-sequence star with a mild underabundance of iron. Magnitude 10.92 component B is likewise a single-lined spectroscopic binary, having an orbital period of 659.9 days and an eccentricity of 0.70. The separation of Bab is 45 mas, and their spectrum matches a red dwarf class of M3 V.
