= WASP-6 =

Star in the constellation Aquarius

WASP-6 / Márohu
Observation data Epoch J2000.0 Equinox ICRS
- Constellation: Aquarius
- Right ascension: 23^{h} 12^{m} 37.73683^{s}
- Declination: −22° 40′ 26.2738″
- Apparent magnitude (V): 11.9

Characteristics
- Evolutionary stage: Main sequence
- Spectral type: G8V
- Apparent magnitude (B): ~12.9
- Apparent magnitude (R): ~11.9
- Apparent magnitude (J): 10.769 ±0.026
- Apparent magnitude (H): 10.445 ±0.025
- Apparent magnitude (K): 10.325 ±0.025

Astrometry
| Radial velocity (R_{v}) | 11.84±0.89 km/s |
| Proper motion (μ) | RA: −23.264(15) mas/yr Dec.: −37.143(14) mas/yr |
| Parallax (π) | 5.0073±0.0130 mas |
| Distance | 651 ± 2 ly (199.7 ± 0.5 pc) |

Details
| Mass | 0.880+0.050 −0.080 M_{☉} |
| Radius | 0.870+0.025 −0.036 R_{☉} |
| Luminosity | 0.60 L_{☉} |
| Temperature | 5450±100 K |
| Metallicity [Fe/H] | −0.200±0.090 dex |
| Rotation | 23.80±0.15 d |
| Rotational velocity (v sin i) | 1.4±1.0 km/s |
| Age | 11.0+3.0 −7.0 Gyr |

Other designations
- Márohu, TOI-231, TIC 204376737, WASP-6, TYC 6972-75-1, 2MASS J23123773-2240261, DENIS J231237.7-224025, UCAC2 22823425

Database references
| SIMBAD | data |
| Exoplanet Archive | data |

WASP-6, also officially named Márohu, is a type-G yellow dwarf star located about 651 light-years (200 parsecs) away in the constellation Aquarius. Dim at magnitude 12, it is visible through a moderate sized amateur telescope. The star is about 80% of the size and mass of the Sun and it is a little cooler. Starspots in the WASP-6 system helped to refine the measurements of the mass and the radius of the planet WASP-6b.

== Nomenclature ==
The designation WASP-6 indicates that this was the 6th star found to have a planet by the Wide Angle Search for Planets.

In 2019 the IAU announced that WASP-6 and its planet WASP-6b would be given official names chosen by the public from the proposals collected in a national campaign from the Dominican Republic, as part of NameExoWorlds. The star WASP-6 is named Márohu and its planet Boinayel from the proposal received by Marvin del Cid. Márohu, the cemí of drought, is the protector of the Sun.

== Planetary system ==
The SuperWASP project announced that this star has an exoplanet, WASP-6b, in 2008. This object was detected by the astronomical transit method. It is a hot Jupiter with an inflated radius and low density.

The WASP-6 planetary system
| Companion (in order from star) | Mass | Semimajor axis (AU) | Orbital period (days) | Eccentricity | Inclination (°) | Radius |
|---|---|---|---|---|---|---|
| b / Boinayel | 0.483+0.026 −0.030 M_{J} | 0.04217+0.00079 −0.0012 | 3.36100239(37) | <0.070 | 88.47+0.65 −0.47 | 1.224+0.051 −0.052 R_{J} |

== See also ==
- SuperWASP or WASP Planetary Search Program
- List of extrasolar planets
