= 104 Aquarii =

Star in the constellation Aquarius

- Location of 104 Aquarii (circled in red)

Observation data Epoch J2000 Equinox ICRS
- Constellation: Aquarius
- Right ascension: 23^{h} 41^{m} 45.80579^{s}
- Declination: −17° 48′ 59.5175″
- Apparent magnitude (V): 4.83

Characteristics
- Spectral type: G2 Ib/II
- U−B color index: +0.49
- B−V color index: +0.82

Astrometry
Radial velocity (R_{v})	+6.52±0.15 km/s
Proper motion (μ)	RA: +14.872 mas/yr Dec.: +0.862 mas/yr
Parallax (π)	4.5774±0.1882 mas
Distance	710 ± 30 ly (218 ± 9 pc)
Absolute magnitude (M_{V})	−2.49

Details
Mass	4.23 M_{☉}
Radius	31.9±2.3 R_{☉}
Luminosity	447 L_{☉}
Surface gravity (log g)	2.20 cgs
Temperature	5,444±14 K
Metallicity [Fe/H]	+0.05 dex
Rotational velocity (v sin i)	15 km/s
Age	135 Myr

Other designations
- BD−18 6358, HD 222574, HIP 116901, HR 8982, SAO 165836

Database references
SIMBAD	data

104 Aquarii (abbreviated 104 Aqr) is a star in the equatorial constellation of Aquarius. 104 Aquarii is the Flamsteed designation, although it also bears the Bayer designation A^{2} Aquarii. Based on an annual parallax shift of only 3.89 ± 0.25 milliarcseconds, the distance to this star is about 840 light-years (260 parsecs). At that range, the brightness of the star in the V-band is reduced by 0.10 magnitudes as a result of extinction caused by intervening gas and dust.

The star has a stellar classification of G2 Ib/II, which places it on the borderline between the bright giant and lower luminosity supergiant stars. It has passed the first dredge-up and may be undergoing Cepheid-like pulsations. With more than four times the mass of the Sun, this is an evolved star that has reached its current stage after only 135 million years. It has expanded to around 32 times the Sun's radius and is radiating 447–fold the luminosity of the Sun. This energy is being emitted from its outer atmosphere at an effective temperature of 5,478 K, giving it the golden-hued glow of a G-type star. It is a suspected variable star.

There is an optical companion, HD 222561, a magnitude 8.5 star with an angular separation of 119 arcseconds from the primary. It is an unrelated background star, with a smaller parallax and different proper motion.
