= WASP-6b =

Extrasolar planet

WASP-6b / Boinayel
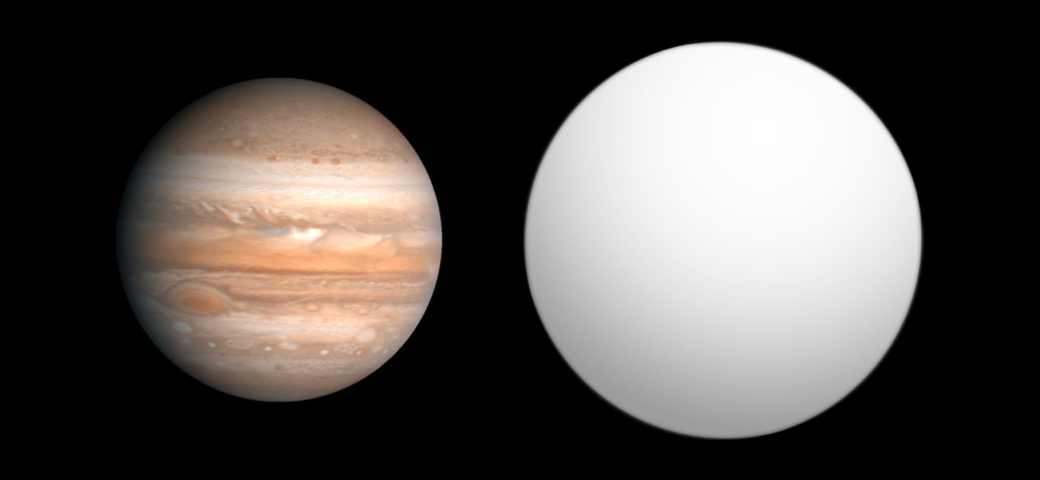
- Size comparison of WASP-6b with Jupiter.

Discovery
- Discovered by: Gillon et al. (SuperWASP)
- Discovery site: SAAO
- Discovery date: April 1, 2008
- Detection method: Transit

Orbital characteristics
- Semi-major axis: 0.04217+0.00079 −0.0012 AU
- Eccentricity: <0.070
- Orbital period (sidereal): 3.36100239(37) d
- Inclination: 88.47°+0.65° −0.47°
- Argument of periastron: 1.70+0.12 −0.23
- Semi-amplitude: 71.6+2.4 −2.6 m/s
- Star: WASP-6

Physical characteristics
- Mean radius: 1.224+0.051 −0.052 R_{J}
- Mass: 0.483+0.026 −0.030 M_{J}
- Mean density: 0.326+0.048 −0.043 g/cm^{3}
- Surface gravity: 0.82 g
- Temperature: 1235+70 −77 K (962 °C; 1,763 °F)

WASP-6b, also named Boinayel, is an exoplanet approximately 650 light years away in the constellation Aquarius. It was discovered in 2008, by the WASP survey, by astronomical transit across its parent star WASP-6. This planet orbits at only 4% of the Earth-Sun distance. The planet has a mass half that of Jupiter, but its insolation has forced a thermal expansion of its radius to greater than that of Jupiter. Thus, this planet is an inflated hot Jupiter. Starspots on the host star WASP-6 helped to refine the measurements of the mass and the radius of the planet.

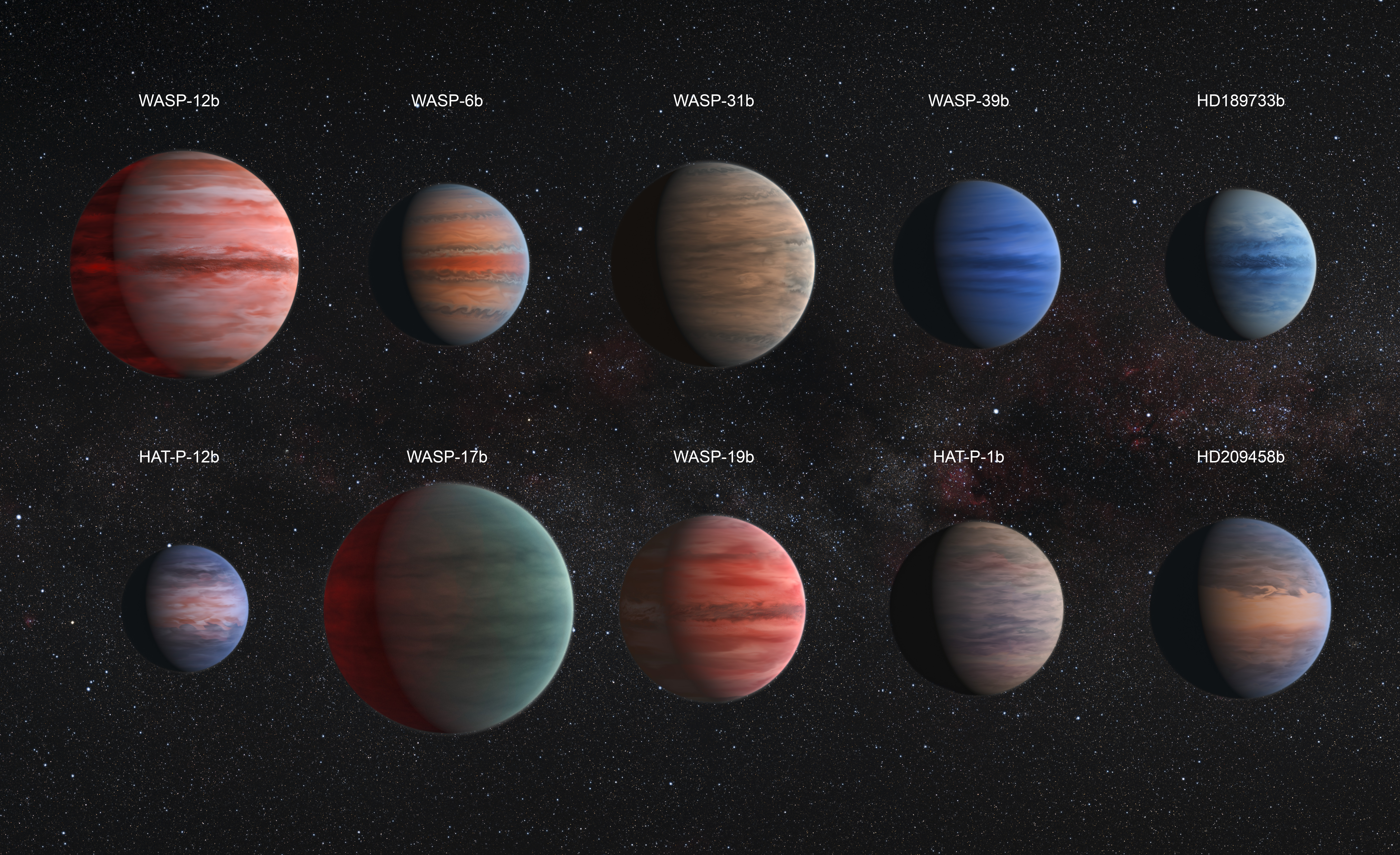
Comparison of "hot Jupiter" exoplanets (artist concept). From top left to lower right: WASP-12b, WASP-6b, WASP-31b, WASP-39b, HD 189733b, HAT-P-12b, WASP-17b, WASP-19b, HAT-P-1b and HD 209458b.

== Naming ==
In 2019 the IAU announced as part of NameExoWorlds that WASP-6 and its planet WASP-6b would be given official names chosen by school children from The Dominican Republic. The planet WASP-6b is named Boinayel. Boinayel is a Taíno deity of rain, that fertilizes the soil.

== Orbit ==
A study in 2012, utilizing the Rossiter–McLaughlin effect, determined that the planetary orbit is probably aligned with the equatorial plane of the star, with misalignment equal to -11^{+18}_{−14}°.

== Atmosphere ==
Observations with the Magellan Telescope in 2013 studied the transits in different wavelengths. The study observed a decrease in transit depth as a function of wavelength, characteristic of a scattering haze. No spectral features were detected. A study in 2015 using Hubble Space Telescope and Spitzer Space Telescope data also found evidence of a scattering haze, but it found tentative evidence for sodium and potassium. A study in 2015, using the Spitzer Space Telescope detected the eclipse of the planet behind the host star. The study found a dayside temperature of 1235+70
−77 K (962+70
−77 °C) and 1118+68
−74 K (845+68
−74 °C) for the 3.6 and 4.5 μm channels respectively. A study from 2019 using data from ground based observatories, such as the Very Large Telescope and space telescopes, such as the Transiting Exoplanet Survey Satellite analysed the atmosphere of WASP-6b. This study confirmed the presence of sodium and potassium in the atmosphere. The study also found water vapour in the atmosphere of the planet. The study came to the conclusion that despite the presence of a haze in the atmosphere of WASP-6b, the planet remains a favourable object for future atmospheric characterisation with missions such as JWST.

== See also ==
- SuperWASP or WASP planetary search program
