= 103 Aquarii =

Star in the constellation Aquarius

Observation data Epoch J2000.0 (ICRS) Equinox J2000.0 (ICRS)
- Constellation: Aquarius
- Right ascension: 23^{h} 41^{m} 34.48893^{s}
- Declination: −18° 01′ 37.4656″
- Apparent magnitude (V): 5.34

Characteristics
- Spectral type: K4/K5 III
- B−V color index: +1.57

Astrometry
Radial velocity (R_{v})	+25.1 km/s
Proper motion (μ)	RA: –41.665 mas/yr Dec.: –71.428 mas/yr
Parallax (π)	4.6918±0.2010 mas
Distance	700 ± 30 ly (213 ± 9 pc)

Details
Radius	63.6+0.5 −1.0 R_{☉}
Luminosity	848±42 L_{☉}
Surface gravity (log g)	1.59 cgs
Temperature	3,910 K
Metallicity [Fe/H]	–0.18 dex

Other designations
- 103 Aqr, BD−18°6357, HD 222547, HIP 116889, HR 8980, SAO 165834

Database references
SIMBAD	data

103 Aquarii is a single star in the equatorial constellation of Aquarius. 103 Aquarii is the Flamsteed designation, although it also bears the Bayer designation A^{1} Aquarii. It is faint but visible to the naked eye as an orange hued star with an apparent visual magnitude of 5.34. Based upon an annual parallax shift of 4.69 mas, the distance to this star is around 700 light-years (210 parsecs). It is moving away from the Earth with a heliocentric radial velocity of +25 km/s.

This is classified as a K-type giant star, having evolved off the main sequence after exhausting the hydrogen at its core and expanded to 64 times the Sun's radius. The star is radiating 848 times the luminosity of the Sun from its enlarged photosphere at an effective temperature of 3,910 K.
