= Piscis Austrinus in Chinese astronomy =

According to traditional Chinese uranography, the modern constellation Piscis Austrinus is located within the northern quadrant of the sky, which is symbolized as the Black Tortoise of the North (北方玄武, Běi Fāng Xuán Wǔ).

The name of the western constellation in modern Chinese is 南魚座 (nán yú zuò), meaning "southern fish constellation".

== Stars ==
The map of Chinese constellation in constellation Piscis Austrinus area consists of:

Four Symbols	Mansion (Chinese name)	Romanization	Translation	Asterisms (Chinese name)	Romanization	Translation	Western star name	Proper Name	Chinese star name	Romanization	Translation
Black Tortoise of the North (北方玄武)
Black Tortoise of the North (北方玄武)	虛	Xū	Emptiness	敗臼	Bàijiù	Decayed Mortar					
Black Tortoise of the North (北方玄武)	虛	Xū	Emptiness	敗臼	Bàijiù	Decayed Mortar	γ PsA		敗臼三	Bàijiùsān	3rd star
Black Tortoise of the North (北方玄武)	虛	Xū	Emptiness	敗臼	Bàijiù	Decayed Mortar	19 PsA		敗臼四	Bàijiùsì	4th star
Black Tortoise of the North (北方玄武)	虛	Xū	Emptiness	敗臼	Bàijiù	Decayed Mortar	β PsA	Tiangang	敗臼增一	Bàijiùzēngyī	1st additional star
Black Tortoise of the North (北方玄武)	虛	Xū	Emptiness	離瑜	Líyú	Jade Ornament on Ladies' Wear					
Black Tortoise of the North (北方玄武)	虛	Xū	Emptiness	離瑜	Líyú	Jade Ornament on Ladies' Wear	5 PsA		離瑜三	Líyúsān	3rd star
Black Tortoise of the North (北方玄武)	虛	Xū	Emptiness	離瑜	Líyú	Jade Ornament on Ladies' Wear	6 PsA		璃瑜增三	Líyúzēngsān	3rd additional star
Black Tortoise of the North (北方玄武)	危	Wēi	Rooftop	天錢	Tiānqián	Celestial Money					
Black Tortoise of the North (北方玄武)	危	Wēi	Rooftop	天錢	Tiānqián	Celestial Money	13 PsA		天錢一	Tiānqiányī	1st star
Black Tortoise of the North (北方玄武)	危	Wēi	Rooftop	天錢	Tiānqián	Celestial Money	θ PsA		天錢二	Tiānqiánèr	2nd star
Black Tortoise of the North (北方玄武)	危	Wēi	Rooftop	天錢	Tiānqián	Celestial Money	ι PsA	Baijiu	天錢三	Tiānqiánsān	3rd star
Black Tortoise of the North (北方玄武)	危	Wēi	Rooftop	天錢	Tiānqián	Celestial Money	μ PsA		天錢四	Tiānqiánsì	4th star
Black Tortoise of the North (北方玄武)	危	Wēi	Rooftop	天錢	Tiānqián	Celestial Money	τ PsA		天錢五	Tiānqiánwǔ	5th star
Black Tortoise of the North (北方玄武)	危	Wēi	Rooftop	天錢	Tiānqián	Celestial Money	η PsA		天錢增一	Tiānqiánzēngyī	1st additional star
Black Tortoise of the North (北方玄武)	危	Wēi	Rooftop	天錢	Tiānqián	Celestial Money	11 PsA		天錢增二	Tiānqiánzēngèr	2nd additional star
Black Tortoise of the North (北方玄武)	危	Wēi	Rooftop	天錢	Tiānqián	Celestial Money	8 PsA		天錢增三	Tiānqiánzēngsān	3rd additional star
Black Tortoise of the North (北方玄武)	危	Wēi	Rooftop	天錢	Tiānqián	Celestial Money	7 PsA		天錢增四	Tiānqiánzēngsì	4th additional star
Black Tortoise of the North (北方玄武)	室	Shì	Encampment	羽林軍	Yǔlínjūn	Palace Guard					
Black Tortoise of the North (北方玄武)	室	Shì	Encampment	羽林軍	Yǔlínjūn	Palace Guard	λ PsA		羽林軍六	Yǔlínjūnliù	6th star
Black Tortoise of the North (北方玄武)	室	Shì	Encampment	羽林軍	Yǔlínjūn	Palace Guard	HD 212448		羽林軍七	Yǔlínjūnqī	7th star
Black Tortoise of the North (北方玄武)	室	Shì	Encampment	羽林軍	Yǔlínjūn	Palace Guard	ε PsA		羽林軍八	Yǔlínjūnbā	8th star
Black Tortoise of the North (北方玄武)	室	Shì	Encampment	羽林軍	Yǔlínjūn	Palace Guard	21 PsA		羽林軍九	Yǔlínjūnjiǔ	9th star
Black Tortoise of the North (北方玄武)	室	Shì	Encampment	羽林軍	Yǔlínjūn	Palace Guard	20 PsA		羽林軍十	Yǔlínjūnshí	10th star
Black Tortoise of the North (北方玄武)	室	Shì	Encampment	北落師門	Běiluòshīmén	North Gate of the Military Camp	α PsA	Fomalhaut	北落師門	Běiluòshīmén	(One star of)
Black Tortoise of the North (北方玄武)	室	Shì	Encampment	天綱	Tiāngāng	Materials for Making Tents	δ PsA		天綱	Tiāngāng	(One star of)

== See also ==
- Chinese astronomy
- Traditional Chinese star names
- Chinese constellations
