= List of stars in Piscis Austrinus =

This is the list of notable stars in the constellation Piscis Austrinus, sorted by decreasing brightness.

Name	B	F	Var	HD	HIP	RA	Dec	vis. mag.	abs. mag.	Dist. (ly)	Sp. class	Notes
Fomalhaut	α	24		216956	113368	22^{h} 57^{m} 38.83^{s}	−29° 37′ 18.6″	1.17	1.74	25	A3V	Fom Alhout Algenubi, Os Piscis Meridiani, Os Piscis Meridionalis, Os Piscis Notii, Difda al Auwel; 18th brightest star; has a circumstellar disk; suspected variable
ε PsA	ε	18		214748	111954	22^{h} 40^{m} 39.33^{s}	−27° 02′ 37.0″	4.18	−2.61	744	B8V	suspected variable, V_{max} = 4.12^{m}, V_{min} = 4.24^{m}
δ PsA	δ (Note: Also labelled Omicron Piscis Austrini (ο PsA/ο Piscis Austrini) by bode in his Uranographia)	23		216763	113246	22^{h} 55^{m} 56.89^{s}	−32° 32′ 22.9″	4.20	0.61	170	G8III	Tiāngāng (天綱)
β PsA	β	17		213398	111188	22^{h} 31^{m} 30.29^{s}	−32° 20′ 45.7″	4.29	1.00	148	A1V	Tiangang
ι PsA	ι	9		206742	107380	21^{h} 44^{m} 56.79^{s}	−33° 01′ 32.0″	4.35	0.36	205	B9.5V	Baijiu
γ PsA	γ (Note: Also labelled Xi Piscis Austrini (ξ PsA/ξ Piscis Austrini) by Bode in his Uranographia)	22		216336	112948	22^{h} 52^{m} 31.56^{s}	−32° 52′ 31.6″	4.46	0.29	222	A0III	suspected variable, V_{max} = 4.45^{m}, V_{min} = 4.50^{m}
μ PsA	μ	14		210049	109285	22^{h} 08^{m} 22.95^{s}	−32° 59′ 18.2″	4.50	1.49	130	A2V	suspected variable
τ PsA	τ	15		210302	109422	22^{h} 10^{m} 08.48^{s}	−32° 32′ 54.4″	4.94	3.58	61	F6V	
υ PsA	υ			210066	109289	22^{h} 08^{m} 25.93^{s}	−34° 02′ 37.4″	4.99	−1.06	528	K4III	
θ PsA	θ	10		207155	107608	21^{h} 47^{m} 44.17^{s}	−30° 53′ 53.9″	5.02	−0.06	339	A1V	
π PsA	π			217792	113860	23^{h} 03^{m} 29.76^{s}	−34° 44′ 58.6″	5.12	2.84	93	A9V	γ Dor variable, V_{max} = 5.10^{m}, V_{min} = 5.12^{m}, P = 1.06039 d
HD 210271				210271	109404	22^{h} 09^{m} 55.71^{s}	−34° 00′ 54.1″	5.37	1.30	212	A5IV	
η PsA	η	12		209014	108661	22^{h} 00^{m} 50.22^{s}	−28° 27′ 13.5″	5.43	−2.03	1012	B8/B9V+...	suspected variable, V_{max} = 5.33^{m}, V_{min} = 5.44^{m}
λ PsA	λ	16		210934	109789	22^{h} 14^{m} 18.74^{s}	−27° 46′ 00.9″	5.45	−0.51	508	B7V	
WX PsA			WX	217236	113532	22^{h} 59^{m} 35.76^{s}	−29° 27′ 44.4″	5.51	0.26	366	F0V	δ Sct variable
HD 217484				217484	113669	23^{h} 01^{m} 19.35^{s}	−28° 51′ 14.1″	5.55	−0.72	584	K3III	
HD 210848	φ (Note: Labelled Phi Piscis Austrini (φ PsA/φ Piscis Austrini) by Bode in his Uranographia)			210848	109737	22^{h} 13^{m} 44.39^{s}	−25° 10′ 51.3″	5.58	1.43	221	F7II	
VZ PsA			VZ	214484	111809	22^{h} 38^{m} 51.46^{s}	−33° 04′ 53.0″	5.66	0.04	435	A0V	Algol variable, V_{max} = 5.66^{m}, V_{min} = 5.83^{m}, P = 5.76333 d
HD 217303				217303	113562	23^{h} 00^{m} 05.77^{s}	−25° 09′ 50.4″	5.66	−1.02	706	K0IICNIII	
8 PsA	(b) (Note: Designated as b Globus Aerostatici by Bode in his Uranographia)	8		205471	106654	21^{h} 36^{m} 10.90^{s}	−26° 10′ 17.2″	5.73	2.07	176	A7/A8IV	
HD 214122	σ (Note: Labelled Sigma Piscis Austrini (σ PsA/σ Piscis Austrini) by Bode in his Uranographia)			214122	111600	22^{h} 36^{m} 35.47^{s}	−31° 39′ 49.3″	5.82	0.92	312	K2III	
HD 214690				214690	111934	22^{h} 40^{m} 22.38^{s}	−30° 39′ 30.1″	5.88	−0.59	642	K2/K3III	suspected variable, V_{max} = 5.86^{m}, V_{min} = 5.89^{m}
HD 213135				213135	111045	22^{h} 29^{m} 45.94^{s}	−27° 06′ 26.0″	5.95	2.83	137	F0V	suspected variable, V_{max} = 5.94^{m}, V_{min} = 5.99^{m}
6 PsA	(e) (Note: Designated as e Globus Aerostatici by Bode in his Uranographia)	6		204854	106340	21^{h} 32^{m} 14.58^{s}	−33° 56′ 40.6″	5.97	0.46	412	A2V	
UU PsA			UU	209522	108975	22^{h} 04^{m} 36.76^{s}	−26° 49′ 20.4″	5.97	−1.73	1128	B3V (+B)	Be star
21 PsA		21		216210	112862	22^{h} 51^{m} 20.94^{s}	−29° 32′ 10.6″	5.99	0.71	370	G8/K0III	
HD 216761				216761	113234	22^{h} 55^{m} 51.54^{s}	−31° 37′ 59.5″	6.09	−1.23	948	K3III	
7 PsA	(f) (Note: Designated as f Globus Aerostatici by Bode in his Uranographia)	7		205529	106703	21^{h} 36^{m} 48.75^{s}	−33° 02′ 52.4″	6.10	1.79	237	A5V	
19 PsA		19		214966	112102	22^{h} 42^{m} 22.08^{s}	−29° 21′ 39.6″	6.12	−0.23	607	M3III	semiregular variable
HD 211291				211291	109990	22^{h} 16^{m} 37.44^{s}	−25° 53′ 53.3″	6.14	−0.07	568	K1II/III	
HD 217096				217096	113447	22^{h} 58^{m} 35.01^{s}	−35° 31′ 22.6″	6.15	1.70	253	F7V	
HD 210739				210739	109667	22^{h} 12^{m} 57.50^{s}	−26° 19′ 39.8″	6.19	2.37	189	A3V	
HD 205872				205872	106907	21^{h} 39^{m} 06.07^{s}	−33° 40′ 43.5″	6.28	3.01	147	G8IV	
HD 215669				215669	112501	22^{h} 47^{m} 19.21^{s}	−34° 09′ 42.4″	6.28	1.32	320	K1III	
HD 214599				214599	111879	22^{h} 39^{m} 44.12^{s}	−28° 19′ 32.0″	6.30	0.53	466	K0/K1III	
HD 217358				217358	113593	23^{h} 00^{m} 24.58^{s}	−25° 37′ 36.3″	6.30	0.71	428	K1III	
HD 215782	ψ^{2} (Note: Labelled Psi^{2} Piscis Austrini (ψ^{2} PsA/ψ^{2} Piscis Austrini) by Bode in his Uranographia)			215782	112567	22^{h} 47^{m} 56.13^{s}	−25° 54′ 42.3″	6.31	0.31	517	G8III	
HD 216042				216042	112746	22^{h} 49^{m} 59.25^{s}	−32° 48′ 19.4″	6.34	2.12	228	F0V	
HD 210111				210111	109306	22^{h} 08^{m} 42.63^{s}	−33° 07′ 32.7″	6.37	1.89	257	A2III/IV	δ Sct variable, ΔV = 0.04^{m}
HD 208285				208285	108259	21^{h} 55^{m} 55.60^{s}	−30° 36′ 21.1″	6.41	0.90	412	G8III	
HD 205265				205265	106564	21^{h} 34^{m} 52.99^{s}	−29° 41′ 45.9″	6.42	−0.22	695	B8IIIw	suspected variable
ζ PsA	ζ			213296	111138	22^{h} 30^{m} 53.75^{s}	−26° 04′ 24.8″	6.43	0.99	399	K1III	
HD 210300				210300	109412	22^{h} 10^{m} 00.13^{s}	−28° 17′ 33.0″	6.44	1.27	353	A5V	
13 PsA	ν (Note: This designation was dropped by Francis Baily)	13		209476	108952	22^{h} 04^{m} 23.83^{s}	−29° 54′ 59.5″	6.45	−1.55	1299	K5III	
HD 214462				214462	111801	22^{h} 38^{m} 44.70^{s}	−28° 44′ 53.5″	6.46	1.00	403	K1III	
TW PsA			TW	216803	113283	22^{h} 56^{m} 23.83^{s}	−31° 33′ 54.6″	6.48	7.07	25	K4Vp	Fomalhaut B; BY Dra variable, V_{max} = 6.44^{m}, V_{min} = 6.51^{m}, P = 10.3 d
HD 206291	(l) (Note: Designated as l Globus Aerostatici by Bode in his Uranographia)			206291	107112	21^{h} 41^{m} 46.21^{s}	−25° 06′ 05.46″	6.49		937		
5 PsA	(c) (Note: Designated as c Globus Aerostatici by Bode in his Uranographia)	5		204394	106067	21^{h} 29^{m} 03.73^{s}	−31° 14′ 18.7″	6.52	1.21	377	A1V	
20 PsA	ψ^{1} (Note: Labelled Psi^{1} Piscis Austrini (ψ^{1} PsA/ψ^{1} Piscis Austrini) by Bode in his Uranographia)	20		215452	112362	22^{h} 45^{m} 31.3^{s}	−25° 14′ 22.5″	6.56		284	A0IV	
HD 205905	(m) (Note: Designated as m Globus Aerostatici by Bode in his Uranographia)			205905	106913	21^{h} 39^{m} 10.15^{s}	−27° 18′ 23.66″	6.7		83		
HD 209335	ω (Note: Labelled Omega Piscis Austrini (ω PsA/ω Piscis Austrini) by Bode in his Uranographia)			209335	108871	22^{h} 03^{m} 17.02^{s}	–29° 54′ 16.2″	7.14		234	F2V	
11 PsA		11		208851	108571	21^{h} 59^{m} 33.4^{s}	−27° 37′ 58.6″	7.31		247	F2V	
Lacaille 9352				217987	114046	23^{h} 05^{m} 52.04^{s}	−35° 51′ 11.1″	7.34	9.75	11	M0.5V	one of the nearest known star systems
HD 216770				216770	113238	22^{h} 55^{m} 53.70^{s}	−26° 39′ 31.6″	8.10	5.21	124	K1V	has a planet (b)
HD 205739				205739	106824	21^{h} 38^{m} 08.41^{s}	−31° 44′ 14.9″	8.56	3.78	295	G3IV	Sāmaya; has a planet (b)
HD 207832				207832	107985	21^{h} 52^{m} 36.0^{s}	−26° 01′ 36″	8.79		177	G5V	has two planets (b and c )
RW PsA			RW			22^{h} 09^{m} 46.92^{s}	−27° 04′ 01.7″	11.16				W UMa variable, V_{max} = 11.05^{m}, V_{min} = 11.76^{m}, P = 0.36045101 d
WASP-124						22^{h} 10^{m} 51.0^{s}	−30° 44′ 58″	12.7		1412	F9	has a transiting planet (b)
WASP-112						22^{h} 37^{m} 57.0^{s}	−35° 09′ 14″	13.3		1468	G6	has a transiting planet (b)
TY PsA			TY			22^{h} 49^{m} 39.90^{s}	−27° 06′ 53.2″				DA	SU UMa variable
Table legend: • Name = Proper name • B = Bayer designation • F or/and G. = Flamsteed designation or Gould designation • Var = Variable-star designation • HD = Henry Draper Catalogue designation number • HIP = Hipparcos Catalogue designation number • RA = Right ascension for the Epoch/Equinox J2000.0 • Dec = Declination for the Epoch/Equinox J2000.0 • vis. mag. = visual magnitude (m or m_{v}), also known as apparent magnitude • abs. mag. = absolute magnitude (M_{v}) • Dist. (ly) = Distance in light-years from Earth • Sp. class = Spectral class of the star in the stellar classification system • Notes = Common name(s) or alternate name(s); comments; notable properties [for example: multiple star status, range of variability if it is a variable star, exoplanets, etc.]

== See also ==
- List of stars by constellation
