= NGC 7154 =

Galaxy in the constellation Piscis Austrinus

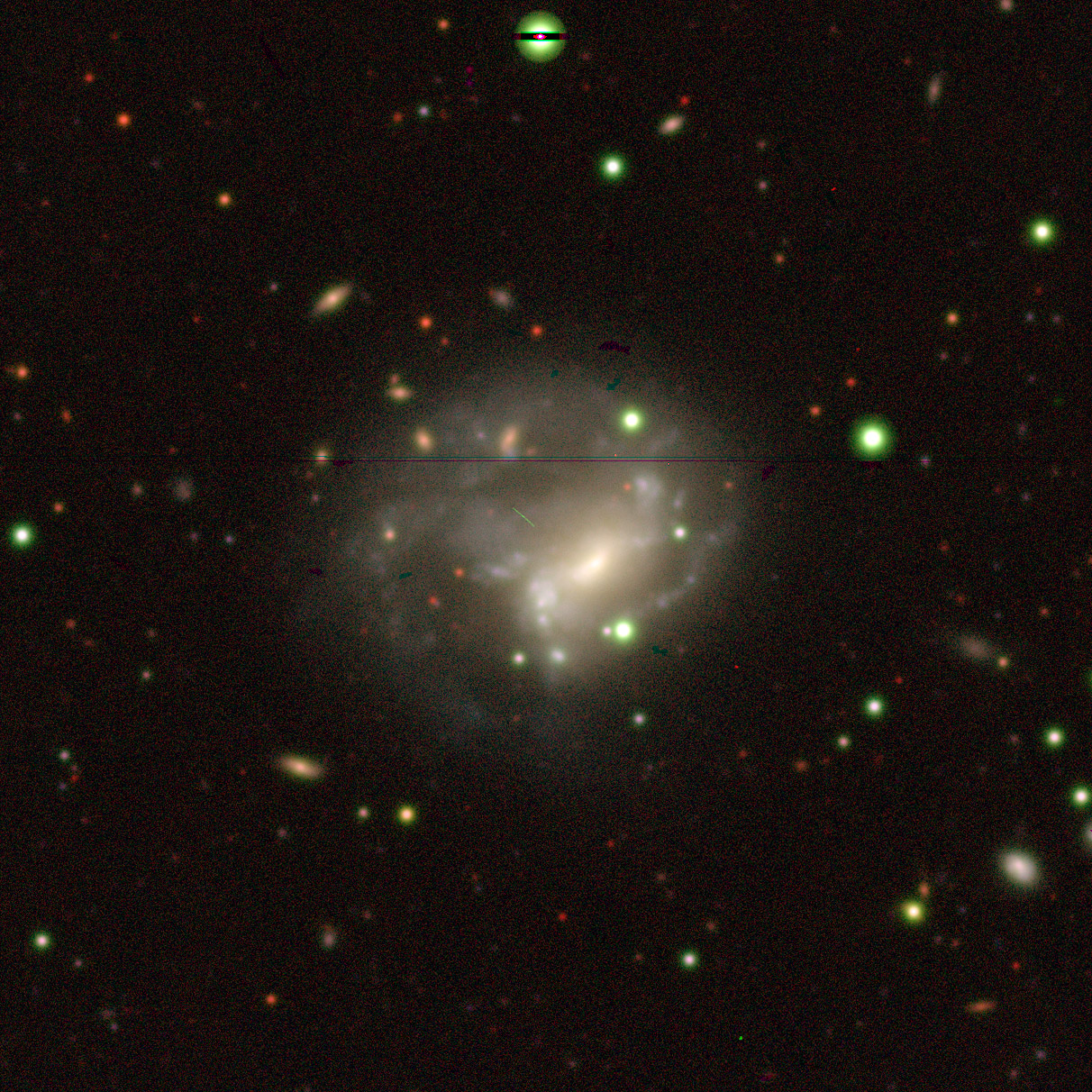
- NGC 7154 imaged by Legacy Surveys

Observation data (J2000 epoch)
- Constellation: Piscis Austrinus
- Right ascension: 21^{h} 55^{m} 21.1700^{s}
- Declination: −34° 48′ 51.697″
- Redshift: 0.008726±0.000010
- Heliocentric radial velocity: 2,616±3 km/s
- Distance: 89.29 ± 16.04 Mly (27.375 ± 4.918 Mpc)
- Group or cluster: IC 5156 group (LGG 450)
- Apparent magnitude (V): 13.14

Characteristics
- Type: SB(s)m pec
- Size: ~86,400 ly (26.48 kpc) (estimated)
- Apparent size (V): 2.1′ × 1.6′

Other designations
- ESO 404- G 008, IRAS 21523-3503, 2MASX J21552103-3448507, MCG -06-48-005, PGC 67641

NGC 7154 is a peculiar barred spiral galaxy in the constellation of Piscis Austrinus. Its velocity with respect to the cosmic microwave background is 2,356±18 km/s, which corresponds to a Hubble distance of 105.3 ± 7.5 Mly (32.3 ± 2.3 Mpc). However, eight non-redshift measurements give a closer mean distance of 89.29 ± 16.04 Mly (27.375 ± 4.918 Mpc). It was discovered by British astronomer John Herschel on 23 September 1834.

NGC 7154 has a possible active galactic nucleus, i.e. it has a compact region at the center of a galaxy that emits a significant amount of energy across the electromagnetic spectrum, with characteristics indicating that this luminosity is not produced by the stars.

== IC 5156 group ==
NGC 7154 is a member of the IC 5156 group (also known as LGG 450). This group contains 14 galaxies, including NGC 7163, NGC 7172, NGC 7173, NGC 7174, NGC 7176, NGC 7187, IC 5156, and six galaxies from the ESO catalogue.

== Supernova ==
One supernova has been observed in NGC 7154:

- SN 2026hze (Type II, mag. 16.1) was discovered by ASAS-SN on 30 March 2026.

== See also ==
- List of NGC objects (7001–7840)
