= PKS 2149−306 =

Blazar in the constellation of Piscis Austrinus

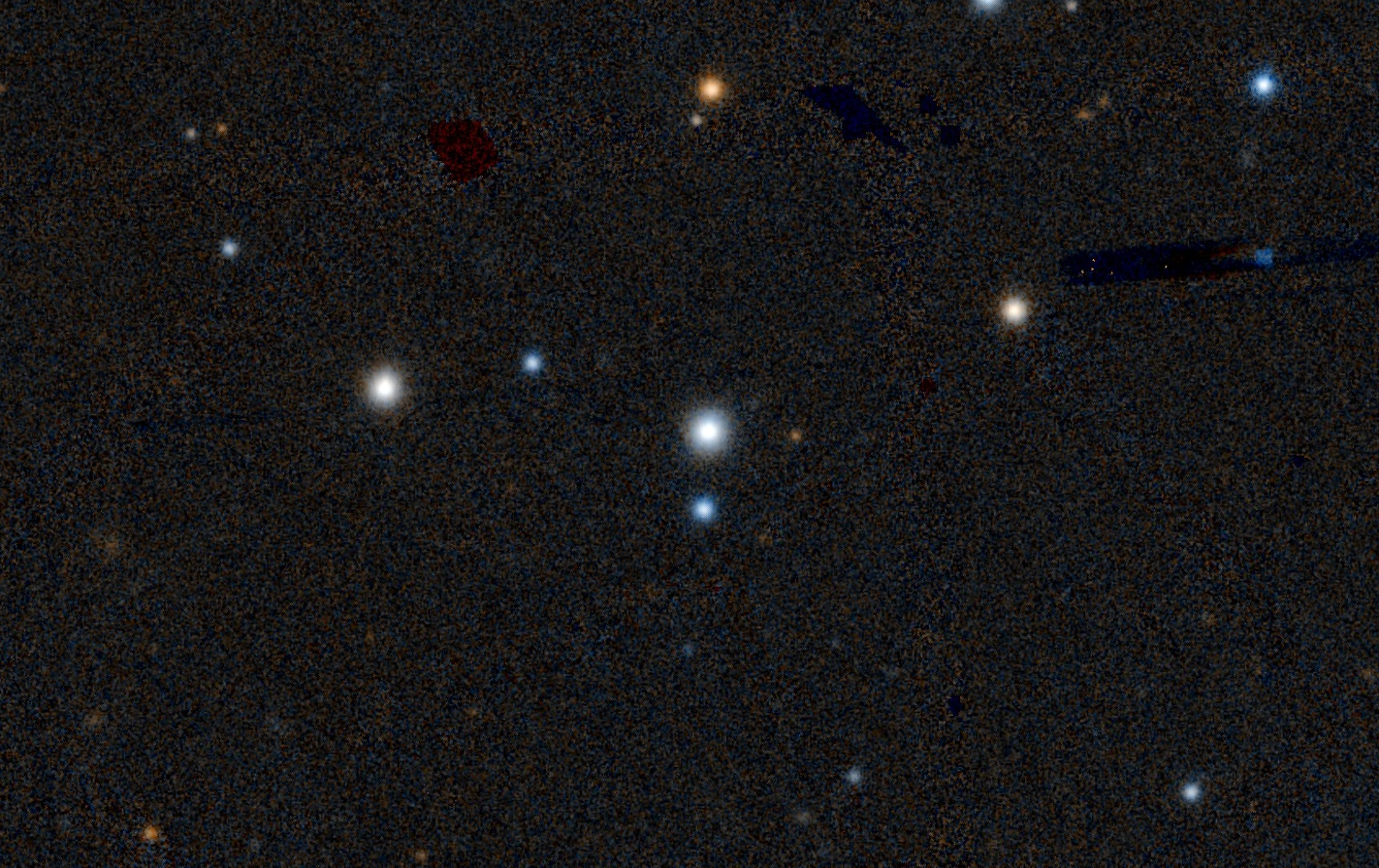
- Pan-STARRS image of quasar PKS 2149−306.

Observation data (J2000.0 epoch)
- Constellation: Piscis Austrinus
- Right ascension: 21^{h} 51^{m} 55.52^{s}
- Declination: −30° 27′ 53.69″
- Redshift: 2.345000
- Heliocentric radial velocity: 703,013 km/s
- Distance: 11.1 Gly
- Apparent magnitude (V): 18.0

Characteristics
- Type: FSRQ

Other designations
- 6dF J2151555−302754, 2MASSI J2151555−302753, RBS 1788, NVSS J215155−302753, TXS 2149−306, RX J2151.9−3027, LEDA 2831080

PKS 2149−306 is a distant blazar located in the southern constellation of Piscis Austrinus. It has a redshift of (z) 2.345 and it was first discovered as a strong radio source by astronomers on September 12, 1983. The radio spectrum of the object is confirmed flat, making it a flat-spectrum radio quasar.

== Description ==
PKS 2149−306 is classified as an X-ray bright radio-loud quasar with a high luminosity value of 6 × 10^{47} ergs s^{−1}. It was displayed a powerful gamma-ray flare in January 2013. The 0.1-100 GeV energy range of the object was shown to have a measured daily peak flux of 301 ± 36 × 10^{−8} photons cm^{−2} s^{−1}, this unit corresponding to around 1.5 ± 0.2 × 10^{50} erg s^{−1}. In addition, it was shown to have both a significant change in its spectra properties, with its six hour timescale displaying flux variations. The Fermi Space Telescope detected a low-activity state in PKS 2149-306 with a low flux value of 6.4 ± 0.6 × 10^{−8} photons cm^{−2} s^{−1}, while no significant signs were detected during the observation campaign between April and May 2009.

The radio structure of PKS 2149−306 can be described as a compact non-point source without any characteristics based on radio mapping, with at least two components containing flux densities of 0.78 and 0.06 Jansky. First epoch imaging showed there is a radio core present with a compact component located in a westerly direction, separated by 8.7 milliarcseconds.

In March 2006 PKS 2149−306 was found to display multiple emission lines of various chemical elements including hydrogen-alpha and helium in its optical spectrum. One of the emission lines displayed an irregular profile, making it somehow unusual. Low atomic elements such as nitrogen, magnesium, neon and sulfur were also discovered in its X-ray spectrum. A supermassive black hole mass of 3.4 × 10^{9} M_{☉} has been estimated for the quasar.
