= PKS 2155−304 =

Galaxy in the constellation Piscis Austrinus

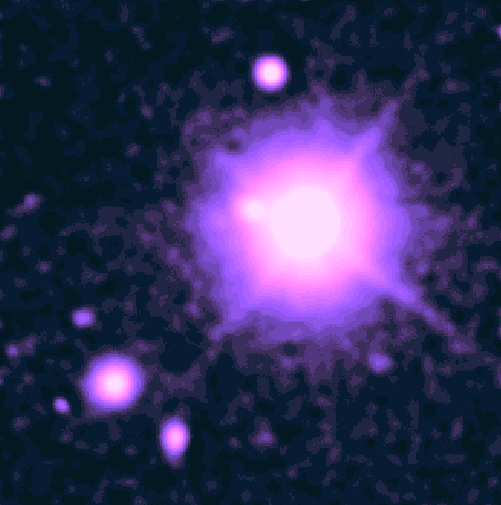
- Image of PKS 2155−304 obtained in R band at ESO-NTT

Observation data (Epoch J2000)
- Constellation: Piscis Austrinus
- Right ascension: 21^{h} 58^{m} 52.0651817803^{s}
- Declination: −30° 13′ 32.120657891″
- Redshift: 0.116
- Distance: 1.5 Gly
- Type: BL Lac
- Apparent magnitude (V): 13.09

Other designations
- QSO B2155−304,

PKS 2155−304 is a BL Lac object, a galaxy hosting a type of blazar. It is a strong emitter from radio to high-energy frequencies.

PKS 2155−304 is at redshift z = 0.116 (Falomo, Pesce & Treves 1993). It is one of the brightest and most studied BL Lacs, one of the first identified through X-ray observations.
