= NGC 7172 =

Galaxy in the constellation of Piscis Austrinus

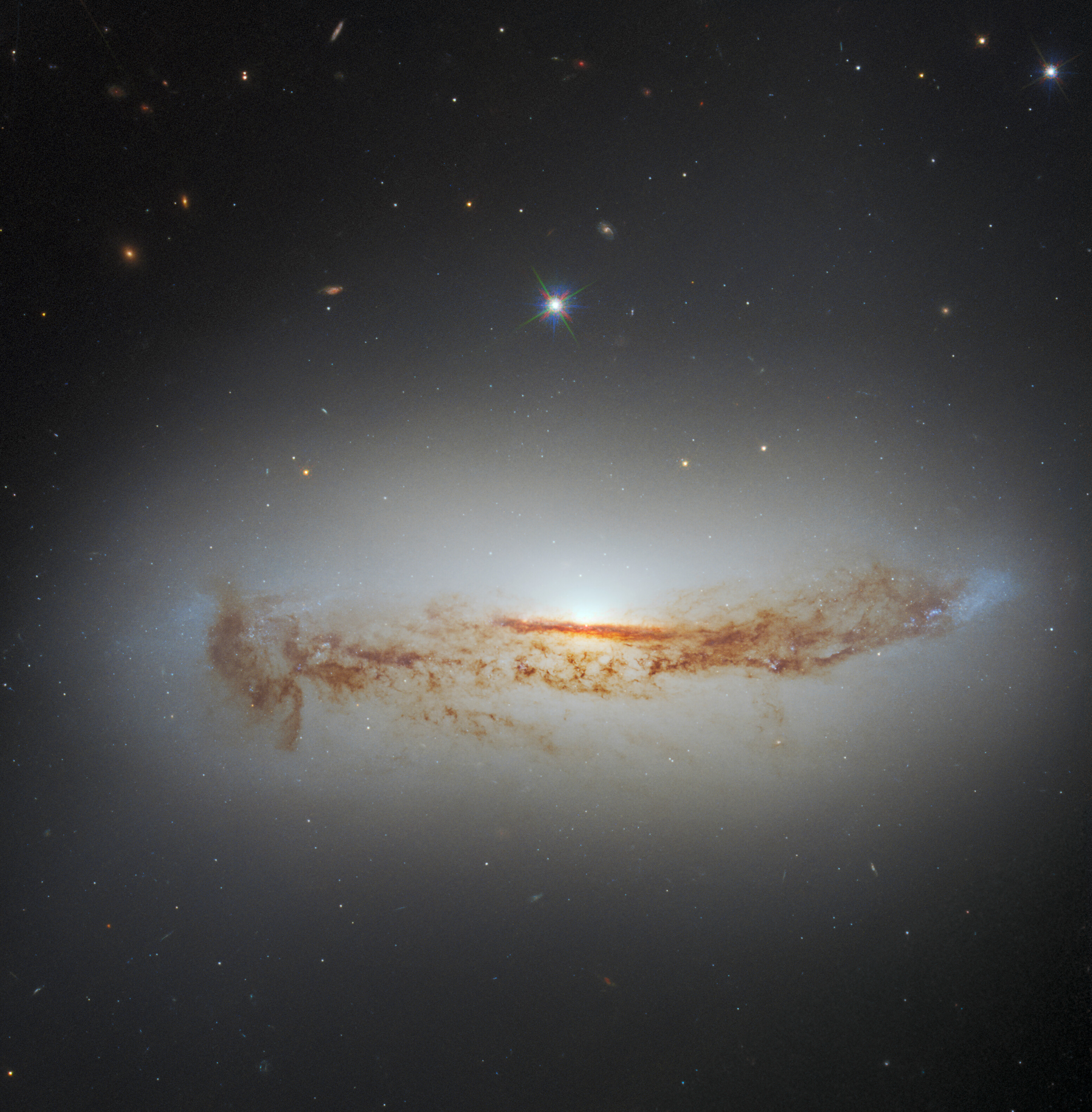
- NGC 7172 by the Hubble Space Telescope

Observation data (J2000 epoch)
- Constellation: Piscis Austrinus
- Right ascension: 22^{h} 02^{m} 01.9^{s}
- Declination: −31° 52′ 11″
- Redshift: 0.008683 ± 0.000040
- Heliocentric radial velocity: 2,603 ± 12 km/s
- Distance: 110 Mly (34 Mpc)
- Apparent magnitude (V): 11.9

Characteristics
- Type: Sa pec
- Apparent size (V): 2.5′ × 1.4′
- Notable features: Seyfert galaxy

Other designations
- ESO 466- G 038, AM 2159-320, MCG -05-52-007, PGC 67874

NGC 7172 is a spiral galaxy located in the constellation Piscis Austrinus. It is located at a distance of about 110 million light years from Earth, which, given its apparent dimensions, means that NGC 7172 is about 100,000 light years across. It was discovered by John Herschel on September 23, 1834.

== Characteristics ==
NGC 7172 is a spiral galaxy that is seen edge-on. A thick dark dust lane runs across the galaxy, obscuring the nucleus of the galaxy. The galaxy appears in deep photographs to be tidally distorted, and a diffuse tail is extending towards the north-west.

=== Nucleus ===
The nucleus of NGC 7172 was originally considered to be normal, but later observations revealed that it emitted X-rays and was a powerful infrared source, which exhibited variation. These findings indicated that NGC 7172 has an active galactic nucleus which is obstructed in optical wavelengths. The nucleus was classified as a type 2 Seyfert galaxy in the optical, but observations in other wavelengths suggest it is type 1 Seyfert galaxy. The source of activity of the nucleus is an accretion disk around a supermassive black hole. The mass of the supermassive black hole in the centre of NGC 7172 is estimated to be 5.5×10^{7} M_{☉} based on the M_{BH}–σ⋆ relation or (1.03±0.35)×10^{7} M_{☉} based on the X-ray scaling method.

NGC 7172 has been found to exhibit variability in X-rays. As observed by the Advanced Satellite for Cosmology and Astrophysics (ASCA), the galaxy exhibited short term variability of about 30% in the time scale of hours, which is common for Seyfert I galaxies. It also exhibits long term variability, as it dimmed three to four times between 1995 and 1996. This was also observed by BeppoSAX. The FeKα line appeared constant when observed with BeppoSAX, but appeared to variate by a factor of two by ASCA, and thus it is associated with an accretion disk. The hard X-ray spectrum appears similar to that of a Seyfert I galaxy, indicating that the nucleus is seen though a Compton-thin absorber.

In infrared observations of the nucleus dominates the spectrum of the active nucleus, with 3.4-μm carbonaceous dust absorption detected, but no 3.3-μm PAH emission, indicating that the nucleus is obstructed. A strong obsurption feature is observed, probably the 9.7-μm silicate dust absorption line. X-rays and mid-infrared have similar absorption columns. It is possible that an outflow towards the southwest is detected in radiowaves.

== Nearby galaxies ==
NGC 7172 is part of the Hickson Compact Group 90. NGC 7172 lies 6 arcminutes north of the core of the compact group, which is comprised by the elliptical galaxies NGC 7173, and NGC 7176, and disturbed spiral galaxy NGC 7174; these three galaxies lie within 6 arcminutes from each other.

The compact group is surrounded by a more loose group, with 19 galaxies of similar redshift within 1.5 degrees from the core group. Garcia identified as members of this group the galaxies NGC 7154, ESO 404- 12, NGC 7163, ESO 466- 36, ESO 466- 46, ESO 404- 27, NGC 7187, IC 5156, ESO 404- 39, and ESO 466- 51. Other nearby galaxies include NGC 7135 and its group, NGC 7204, and NGC 7208.

== See also ==
- NGC 4388 - a similar active galaxy
