= NGC 7314 =

Galaxy in the constellation Piscis Austrinus

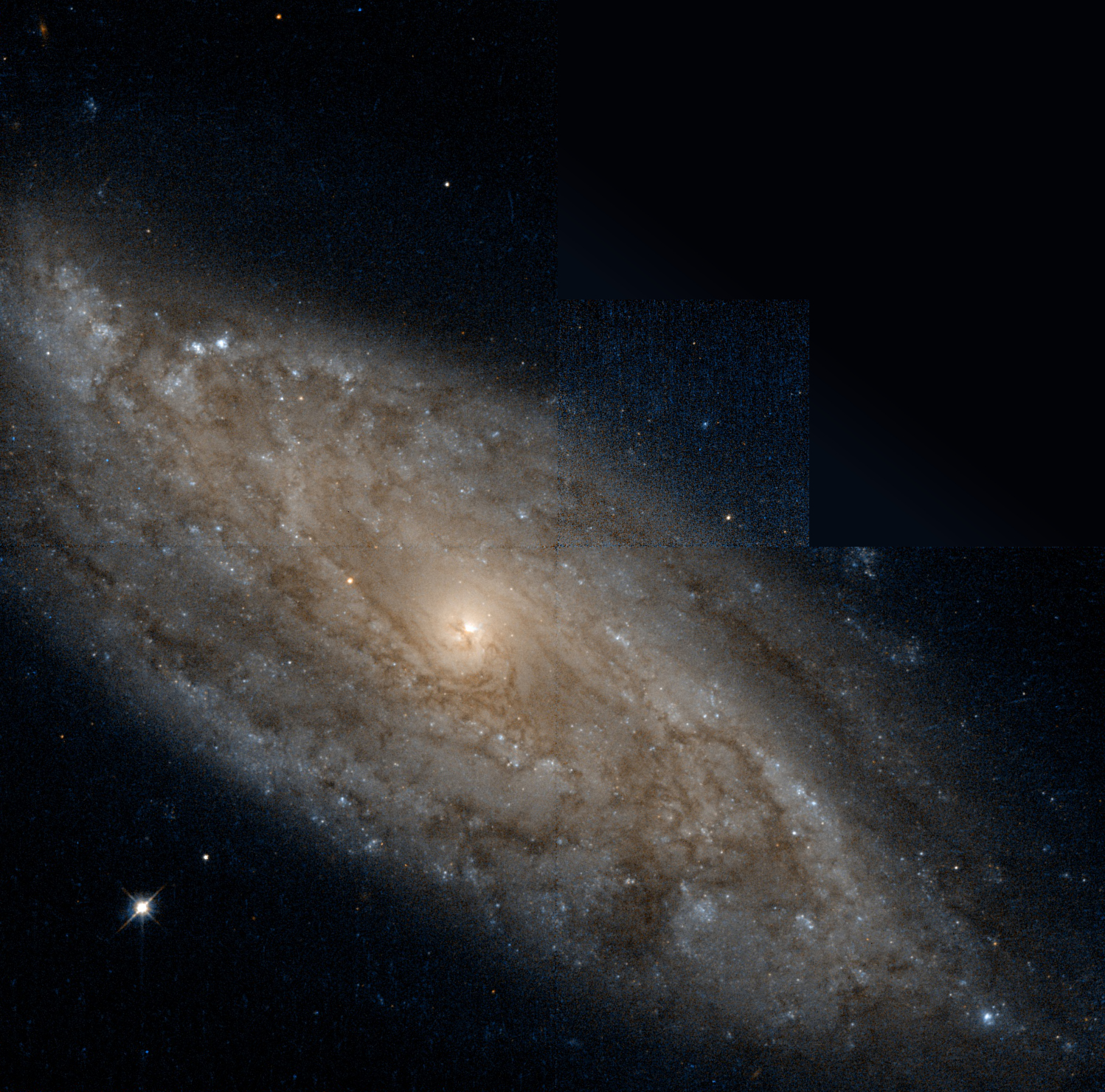
- NGC 7314 taken from Hubble Space Telescope

Observation data (J2000 epoch)
- Constellation: Piscis Austrinus
- Right ascension: 22^{h} 35^{m} 46.19699^{s}
- Declination: −26° 03′ 01.5740″
- Redshift: 0.004743±0.000020
- Heliocentric radial velocity: 1,427 km/s
- Distance: 54.6 Mly (16.75 Mpc)
- Apparent magnitude (V): 11.9
- Apparent magnitude (B): 11.6

Characteristics
- Type: SAB(rs)bc
- Apparent size (V): 4′.37 × 1′.86

Other designations
- NGC 7314, Arp 14, PGC 69253

NGC 7314 is a spiral galaxy located in the southern constellation of Piscis Austrinus. It was discovered by English astronomer John Herschel on July 29, 1834. This is a nearby Seyfert (active) galaxy, located at a distance of approximately 54.6 megalight-years from the Milky Way. Since it appears to have detached spiral arm segments (either from dust lanes or bright star clusters), it was listed in Halton Arp's Atlas of Peculiar Galaxies.

Walter Scott Houston describes its appearance in small telescopes:

Do not let its photographic magnitude of 11.6 scare you off, for it can be seen in a 6-inch telescope as a curiously fuzzy object. But it is small, appearing only 4' by 2'.

The morphological classification of this galaxy is SAB(rs)bc, indicating a spiral galaxy with a weak central bar (SAB), an incomplete ring structure around the bar (rs), and moderately–wound arms (bc). The plane of the galactic disk is inclined by 64° to the line of sight from the Earth, with the major axis aligned along a position angle of 178°. Within the galaxy's core is an active galactic nucleus tentatively classified as a type I Seyfert. The central supermassive black hole has a relatively low mass, estimated as (0.87±0.45)×10^{6} M_{☉}. The core is a source for X-ray emission that is seen to vary dramatically on time scales as low as hours.
