= Pi Piscis Austrini =

Star in the constellation Piscis Austrinus

- Location of π Piscis Austrini (circled)

Observation data Epoch J2000 Equinox ICRS
- Constellation: Piscis Austrinus
- Right ascension: 23^{h} 03^{m} 29.81653^{s}
- Declination: −34° 44′ 57.8827″
- Apparent magnitude (V): 5.12

Characteristics
- Spectral type: F1 V Fe-0.8 + F3 V
- U−B color index: +0.00
- B−V color index: +0.29

Astrometry
Radial velocity (R_{v})	−5.97±0.11 km/s
Proper motion (μ)	RA: +72.789 mas/yr Dec.: +83.569 mas/yr
Parallax (π)	35.3691±0.2124 mas
Distance	92.2 ± 0.6 ly (28.3 ± 0.2 pc)
Absolute magnitude (M_{V})	+2.78

Orbit
Period (P)	178.3177±0.0038 d
Semi-major axis (a)	≥ 0.296 AU
Eccentricity (e)	0.5286±0.0041
Periastron epoch (T)	2,435,319.73±0.25
Argument of periastron (ω) (secondary)	2.62±0.81°
Semi-amplitude (K_{1}) (primary)	21.28±0.16 km/s

Details

A
Mass	1.51 M_{☉}
Radius	1.64+0.11 −0.08 R_{☉}
Luminosity	5.85±0.04 L_{☉}
Surface gravity (log g)	4.30±0.14 cgs
Temperature	7,003+195 −216 K
Metallicity [Fe/H]	+0.12 dex
Age	474 Myr

Other designations
- π PsA, CD−35°15630, GC 32122, GJ 886.2, GJ 9807, HD 217792, HIP 113860, HR 8767, SAO 214275

Database references
SIMBAD	data

Pi Piscis Austrini, Latinized from π Piscis Austrini, is binary star system in the southern constellation of Piscis Austrinus, near the eastern constellation border with Sculptor. It has a yellow-white hue and is visible to the naked eye as a dim point of light with an apparent visual magnitude of 5.12. The system is located at a distance of 92 light-years from the Sun based on parallax. It is drifting closer with a radial velocity of −6 km/s. Pi Piscis Austrini is moving through the galaxy at a velocity of 16.3 km/s relative to the Sun. Its projected galactic orbit carries it between 24,000 and 37,500 light-years from the center of the galaxy.

This is a single-lined spectroscopic binary system with an orbital period of 178.3 days and an eccentricity of 0.53. The primary component is an F-type main-sequence star with a stellar classification of F1 V Fe-0.8.

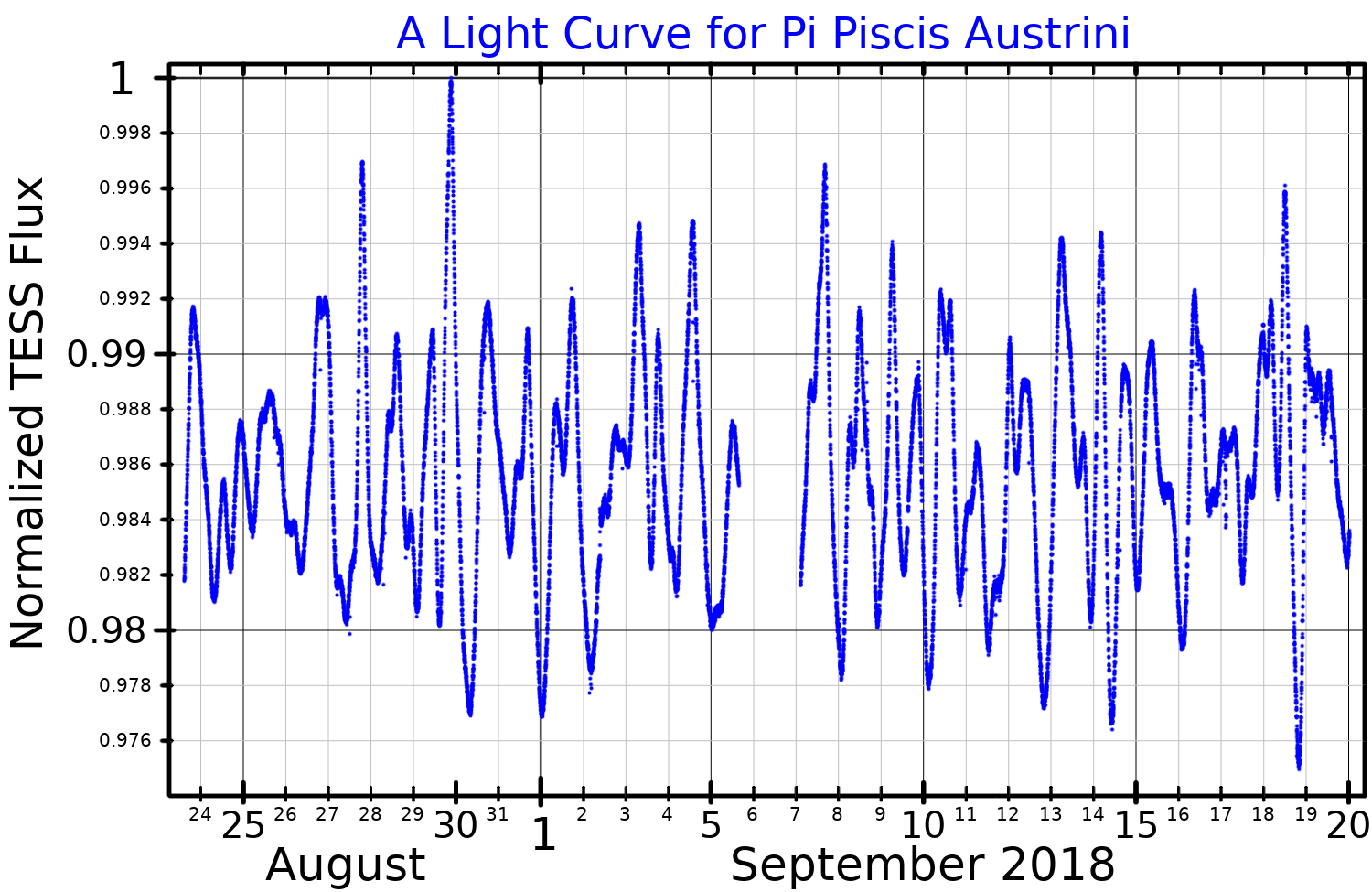
A light curve for Pi Piscis Austrini, plotted from Hipparcos data

As of 2023, there appears to be no consensus in the astronomical literature about whether or not Pi Piscis Austrini is a variable star, and if it is variable, what type of variable star it is. In 1965 it was designated a classical Cepheid variable star with a visual (V) band brightness that varied by 0.3 magnitudes over a period of 7.975 days. The AAVSO's International Variable Star index lists it as a Gamma Doradus variable, with a V band magnitude range of 5.10 to 5.12. Axel Thomas, writing in the AAVSO's Journal, reports that the star appears to be a semiregular variable star, varying by 0.7 magnitudes in V band over a period of 8.625 days. Koen and Eyer examined the Hipparcos data for the star, and report it to be a microvariable with a period of 1.06039 days. On the other hand, the General Catalog of Variable Stars reports the star's brightness as constant, and in separate studies Michel Petit and E. Janot-Pacheco could not detect any change in brightness.

Pi Piscis Austrini displays an infrared excess, suggesting a circumstellar disk is orbiting at a radius of 23 AU with a mean temperature of 90 K. The cooler secondary companion has a class of F3 V. The system appears to be a source of X-ray emission.
