= NGC 7259 =

Galaxy in the constellation Piscis Austrinus

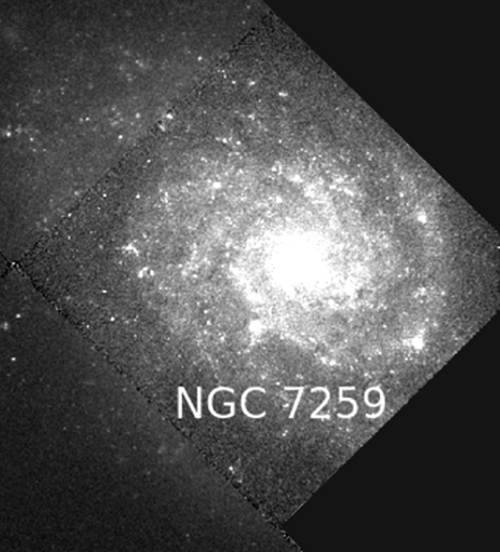
- NGC 7259 (HST)

Observation data (J2000.0 epoch)
- Constellation: Piscis Austrinus
- Right ascension: 22^{h} 23^{m} 05.52^{s}
- Declination: −28° 57′ 17.40″
- Redshift: 0.005944
- Heliocentric radial velocity: 1782 ± 5 km/s
- Distance: 66 Mly
- Apparent magnitude (V): 13.10
- Apparent magnitude (B): 13.90

Characteristics
- Type: Sb
- Apparent size (V): 1.1 x 0.9

Other designations
- PGC 68718, MCG -5-52-69

NGC 7259 is a spiral galaxy approximately 66 million light-years away from Earth in the constellation of Piscis Austrinus. It was discovered by John Herschel on September 28, 1834.

== SN 2009ip ==
In 2009, a possible supernova was detected within the galaxy, and was designated SN 2009ip. Since the brightness faded in a matter of days, it was redesignated as a luminous blue variable (LBV) supernova impostor. During the following years several luminous outbursts were detected from SN 2009ip. In September 2012 SN 2009ip was classified as a young Type IIn supernova.

== See also ==
- List of NGC objects (7001–7840)
- Piscis Austrinus (constellation)
