= SN 2009ip =

Supernova in the constellation Piscis Austrinus

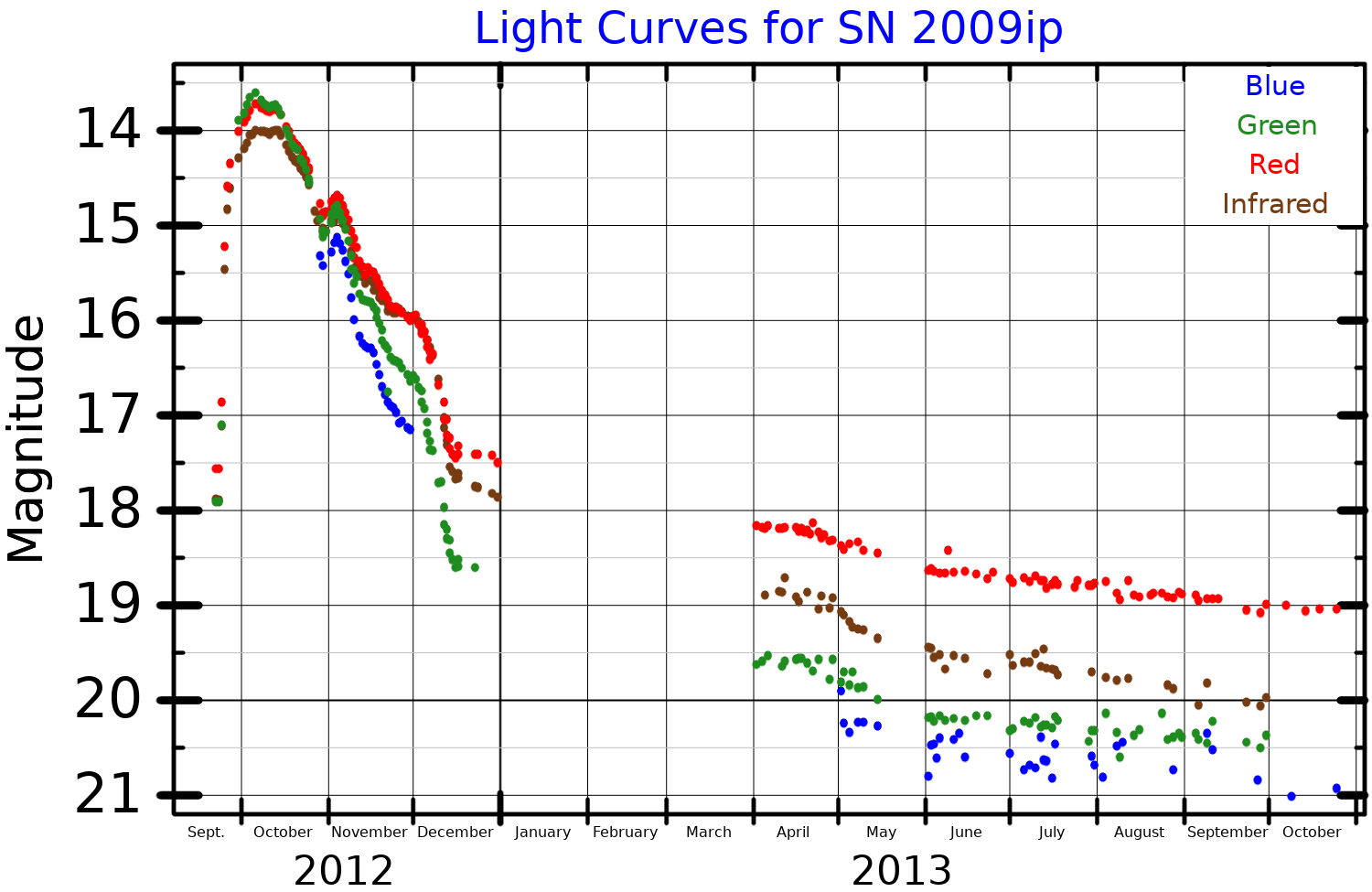
- Light curves for the 2012 outburst of SN 2009ip, in four photometric bands, plotted from data published by Graham et al. (2014)
- Event type: Supernova
- type IIn
- Constellation: Piscis Austrinus
- Right ascension: 22^{h} 23^{m} 08.26^{s}
- Declination: −28° 56′ 52.4″
- Epoch: J2000.0
- Notable features: located in the host galaxy NGC 7259

SN 2009ip was a supernova discovered in 2009 in the spiral galaxy NGC 7259 in the constellation of Piscis Austrinus. Since the brightness waned after days post-discovery, it was redesignated as Luminous blue variable (LBV) supernova impostor.

During the following years several luminous outbursts were detected from the SN 2009ip. In September 2012, SN 2009ip was classified as a young Type IIn supernova.
