= EZ Aquarii =

Star in the constellation Aquarius

- Location of EZ Aquarii in the constellation Aquarius

Observation data Epoch J2000 Equinox ICRS
- Constellation: Aquarius
- Right ascension: 22^{h} 38^{m} 33.73^{s}
- Declination: −15° 17′ 57.3″
- Apparent magnitude (V): 12.38 (13.03/13.27/15.07)

Characteristics
- Spectral type: M5V
- B−V color index: +1.96
- Variable type: Flare star + BY Dra

Astrometry
Radial velocity (R_{v})	−59.9 km/s
Proper motion (μ)	RA: +2314 mas/yr Dec.: +2295 mas/yr
Parallax (π)	293.6±0.9 mas
Distance	11.11 ± 0.03 ly (3.41 ± 0.01 pc)
Absolute magnitude (M_{V})	14.75 (15.33/15.58/17.37)

Orbit
Primary	EZ Aquarii Aa
Name	EZ Aquarii Ab
Period (P)	3.78652±0.00001 days
Semi-major axis (a)	0.030±0.004 AU
Eccentricity (e)	0.000±0.001
Inclination (i)	~117°

Orbit
Primary	EZ Aquarii A
Name	EZ Aquarii B
Period (P)	2.2506±0.0033 yr
Semi-major axis (a)	0.346±0.004" (1.18 AU (Note: Semi-major axis in AU = $\frac{semimajor\ axis\ in\ seconds}{parallax}\ {{=}}\ \frac{.346}{0.2936}$ = 1.18 AU; as the eccentricity is 0.44, the distance fluctuates between 66% and 144% of that, roughly from .66 AU to 1.69 AU.))
Eccentricity (e)	0.437±0.007
Inclination (i)	112.4±0.5°
Longitude of the node (Ω)	162.1±0.4°
Periastron epoch (T)	1987.236 ± 0.014
Argument of periastron (ω) (secondary)	−17.7±1.1°

Details

EZ Aquarii Aa
Mass	0.1216±0.0029 M_{☉}
Radius	0.175 R_{☉}
Luminosity	0.00078 L_{☉}

EZ Aquarii Ab (C)
Mass	0.0957±0.0023 M_{☉}
Luminosity	0.00012 L_{☉}

EZ Aquarii B
Mass	0.1145±0.0012 M_{☉}
Radius	0.21±0.04 R_{☉}
Luminosity	0.0019 L_{☉}
Temperature	2650±200 K

Other designations
- EZ Aqr, GJ 866, G 156-031, L 789-6, LHS 68, GCTP 5475.00

Database references
SIMBAD	data

EZ Aquarii is a triple star system 11.1 light-years (3.4 parsecs) from the Sun in the constellation Aquarius within the Milky Way. It is also known as Luyten 789-6, Gliese 866 and LHS 68. It is a variable star showing flares as well as smaller brightness changes due to rotation. The aggregate mass of the system is 0.3262±0.0018 solar masses. All three seem to have masses close to the hydrogen burning mass limit.

William E. Kunkel announced that Luyten 789-6 was a flare star in 1972, after having observed seven flares. It was given its variable star designation, EZ Aquarii, in 1978.

== System ==
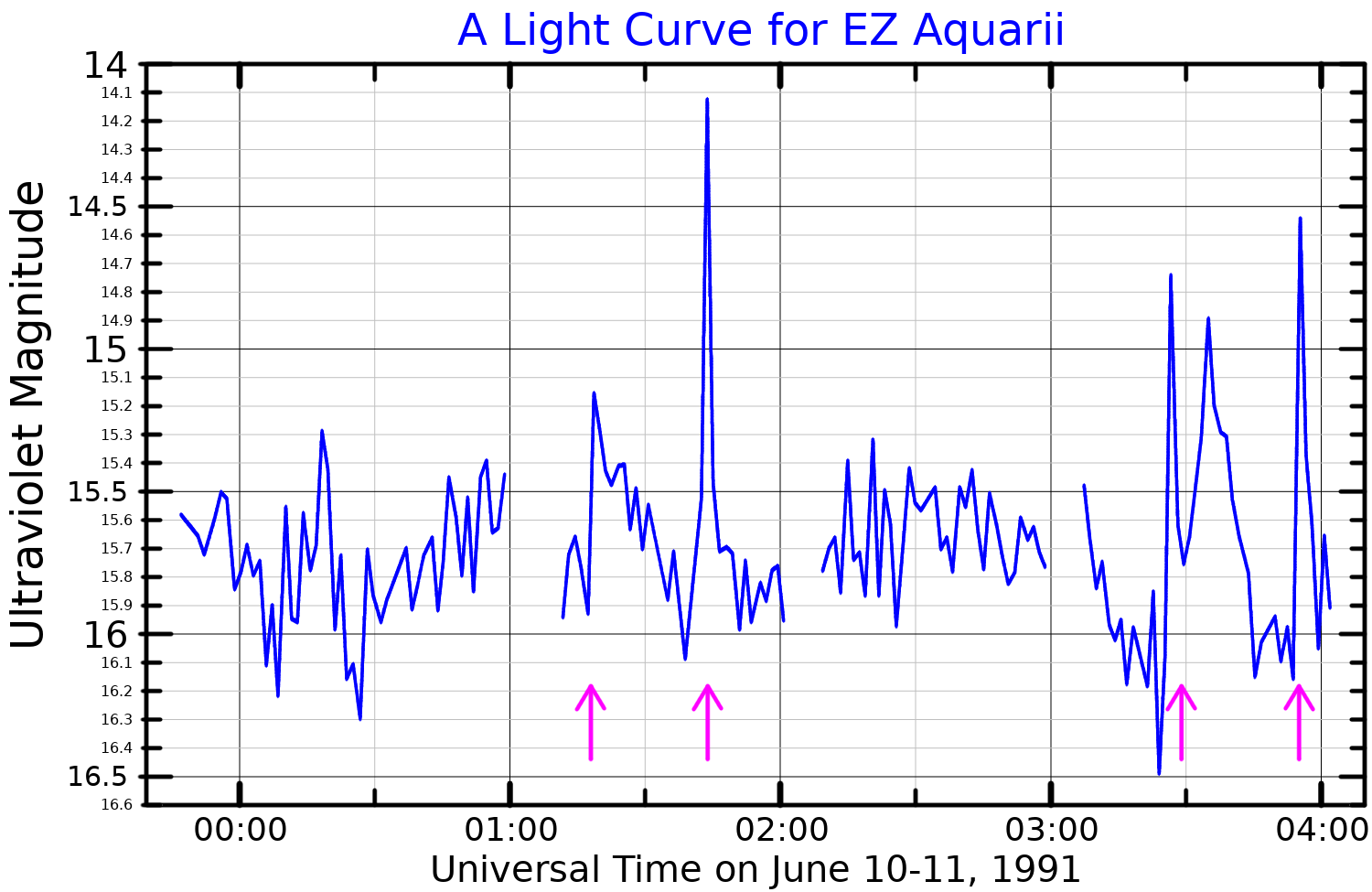
An ultraviolet band light curve for EZ Aquarii, adapted from Jevremovic et al. (1998). The arrows point to the beginning of flares.

All three components are M-type red dwarfs. The pair EZ Aquarii AC form a spectroscopic binary with a 3.8-day orbit and a 0.03 AU separation. This pair share an orbit with EZ Aquarii B that has an 823-day period. The A and B components of Luyten 789-6 together emit X-rays.

The configuration of the inner binary pair may permit a circumbinary planet to orbit near their habitable zone, however no exoplanets have yet been observed. EZ Aquarii is approaching the Solar System and, in about 32,300 years, will be at its minimal distance of about 8.2 ly (2.5 pc) from the Sun. The ChView simulation shows that currently its nearest neighbouring star is Lacaille 9352 at about 4.1 ly (1.3 pc) from EZ Aquarii.

=== EZ Aquarii A ===
The brighter resolved star is a spectroscopic binary consisting of two red dwarfs. They orbit every 3.78652±0.00001 days with an eccentricity of 0 (ie. circular).

The primary, component Aa or just A, is of type M5V and has a mass of 0.1187±0.0011 solar masses. It has an absolute magnitude at wavelengths centered at 5500 Angstroms of 15.33 making it the brightest of the three. Some alternate designations for it are EZ Aqr, GL 866A, L 789-6 A and LHS 68.

The secondary, component Ab, is likely a type MV red dwarf with a mass of 0.0930±0.0008 solar masses. It is the dimmest of the three star with an absolute magnitude of 17.37. An alternate designation for it is GL 866C.

=== EZ Aquarii B ===
There is less known about this star compared to A. Its type is likely MV with a mass of 0.1145±0.0012 solar masses. It orbits the spectroscopic pair with a period of 822.6±0.2 d at an eccentricity of 0.439±0.001. It has an absolute magnitude of 15.58. Some alternate designations for it are GL 866B and L 789-6 B.

== Other details ==
The high proper motion of EZ Aquarii may have been discovered by Willem Jacob Luyten with his automated photographic plate scanner.

== See also ==
- List of nearest stars and brown dwarfs
