= Tau Piscis Austrini =

Star in the constellation Piscis Austrinus

- Location of τ Piscis Austrini (circled)

Observation data Epoch J2000.0 Equinox J2000.0 (ICRS)
- Constellation: Piscis Austrinus
- Right ascension: 22^{h} 10^{m} 08.78019^{s}
- Declination: −32° 32′ 54.2703″
- Apparent magnitude (V): +4.945

Characteristics
- Evolutionary stage: main sequence
- Spectral type: F6 V
- U−B color index: +0.031
- B−V color index: +0.488

Astrometry
| Proper motion (μ) | RA: +428.832 mas/yr Dec.: +13.475 mas/yr |
| Parallax (π) | 54.1773±0.0940 mas |
| Distance | 60.2 ± 0.1 ly (18.46 ± 0.03 pc) |
| Absolute magnitude (M_{V}) | 3.58 |

Details
| Mass | 1.34±0.13 M_{☉} |
| Radius | 1.45±0.04 R_{☉} |
| Luminosity | 2.82±0.09 L_{☉} |
| Surface gravity (log g) | 4.11 cgs |
| Temperature | 6,324 K |
| Metallicity [Fe/H] | −0.01 dex |
| Rotational velocity (v sin i) | 14.1±0.7 km/s |
| Age | 1.3 Gyr |

Other designations
- τ PsA, 15 Piscis Austrini, CPD−33°6227, GJ 849.1, GJ 9770, HD 210302, HIP 109422, HR 8447, SAO 213602

Database references
| SIMBAD | data |

Tau Piscis Austrini (τ Piscis Austrini) is a solitary yellow-white star in the southern constellation of Piscis Austrinus. It is visible to the naked eye with an apparent visual magnitude of +4.9. Based on an annual parallax shift of 54.18 mas, the star is located approximately 60.2 light years from the Sun.

This is an F-type main sequence star with a stellar classification of F6 V. It is about 1.3 billion years old with a projected rotational velocity of 14 km/s and exhibits a low level of activity. The star has an estimated 1.34 times the mass of the Sun and 1.45 times the Sun's radius. It is radiating 2.82 times the solar luminosity from its photosphere at an effective temperature of 6,324 K. This star is a candidate for hosting a debris disk, having initially shown a near-infrared excess, which diminished with further observations.

== Naming ==
In Chinese, 天錢 (Tiān Qián), meaning Celestial Money, refers to an asterism consisting of τ Piscis Austrini, 13 Piscis Austrini, θ Piscis Austrini, ι Piscis Austrini and μ Piscis Austrini. Consequently, the Chinese name for τ Piscis Austrini itself is 天錢五 (Tiān Qián wǔ, English: the Fifth Star of Celestial Money.)
