= Gliese 887 c =

Super-Earth orbiting Gliese 887

Discovery
- Discovered by: Tuomi et al.
- Discovery date: June 2019
- Detection method: Radial velocity

Designations
- Alternative names: Lacaille 9352 c

Orbital characteristics
- Semi-major axis: 0.120±0.004 AU
- Eccentricity: 0.03+0.21 −0.03
- Orbital period (sidereal): 21.789+0.004 −0.005 d
- Semi-amplitude: 2.8±0.4
- Star: Gliese 887

Physical characteristics
- Mass: ≥7.6±1.2 M_{🜨}
- Temperature: 352 K (79 °C; 174 °F)

Gliese 887 c (GJ 887 c) or Lacaille 9352 c is an exoplanet announced in 2020 and located 10.74 light years away, in the constellation of Piscis Austrinus.

It was detected using the radial velocity method from observations with HARPS in Chile and HIRES in Hawaii.

== Characteristics ==
Gliese 887 c is considered a Super-Earth with a minimum mass of 7.6 Earth masses.

With an orbital period of 21.8 days, the exoplanet is located at 0.12 AU from the star, which is close to the inner edge of the habitable zone (but still outside).

The exoplanet has a calculated equilibrium temperature of 352 K (79 °C; 174 °F).

== Host star ==
The planet orbits the red dwarf star Gliese 887, which has an age of 4.57 billion years.
