= Theta Piscis Austrini =

Star in the constellation Piscis Austrinus

- Location of θ Piscis Austrini (circled)

Observation data Epoch J2000.0 Equinox J2000.0 (ICRS)
- Constellation: Piscis Austrinus
- Right ascension: 21^{h} 47^{m} 44.14993^{s}
- Declination: −30° 53′ 53.9027″
- Apparent magnitude (V): +5.01

Characteristics
- Spectral type: A1 V + A1 V
- B−V color index: +0.04

Astrometry
Radial velocity (R_{v})	+12.80±1.8 km/s
Proper motion (μ)	RA: −34.40 mas/yr Dec.: −0.08 mas/yr
Parallax (π)	10.16±0.40 mas
Distance	320 ± 10 ly (98 ± 4 pc)
Absolute magnitude (M_{V})	+0.06

Orbit
Period (P)	19.957±0.050 yr
Semi-major axis (a)	0.137±0.004″
Eccentricity (e)	0.256±0.030
Inclination (i)	103±2°
Longitude of the node (Ω)	29.1±2.0°
Periastron epoch (T)	2006.00±0.07
Argument of periastron (ω) (secondary)	199±6°

Details

θ PsA A
Mass	2.32±0.33 M_{☉}
Luminosity	86 L_{☉}
Surface gravity (log g)	4.05 cgs
Temperature	9,716±330 K
Rotational velocity (v sin i)	150 km/s
Age	281 Myr

θ PsA B
Mass	2.32±0.33 M_{☉}

Other designations
- θ PsA, 10 Piscis Austrini, CPD−31°6596, HD 207155, HIP 107608, HR 8326, SAO 213292, WDS J21477-3054AB

Database references
SIMBAD	data

Theta Piscis Austrini, Latinized as θ Piscis Austrini, is a binary star system in the southern constellation of Piscis Austrinus. It is faintly visible to the naked eye with a combined apparent visual magnitude of +5.01. Based upon an annual parallax shift of 10.16 mas as seen from the Earth, the system is located around 320 light years from the Sun. The system is drifting further away with a radial velocity of +13 km/s.

The binary nature of this system was discovered in 1951 by South African astronomer W. S. Finsen. Both components A and B have the same apparent magnitude. They orbit each other with a period of 20 years and an eccentricity of 0.256. The pair are A-type main sequence stars with stellar classifications of A1 V. A magnitude 11.3 visual companion star, labelled component C, is located at an angular separation of 33.2 arc seconds along a position angle of 342°, as of 1999.

Theta Piscis Austrini is moving through the Galaxy at a speed of 21.3 km/s relative to the Sun. Its projected Galactic orbit carries it between 22,629 and 38,431 light-years from the center of the Galaxy. Theta Piscis Austrini came closest to the Sun 2.7 million years ago at a distance of 256 light-years.

== Naming ==
In Chinese, 天錢 (Tiān Qián), meaning Celestial Money, refers to an asterism consisting of refers to an asterism consisting of θ Piscis Austrini, 13 Piscis Austrini, ι Piscis Austrini, μ Piscis Austrini and τ Piscis Austrini. Consequently, the Chinese name for θ Piscis Austrini itself is 天錢二 (Tiān Qián èr, English: the Second Star of Celestial Money.)
