= Upsilon Piscis Austrini =

Star in the constellation Piscis Austrinus

- Location of υ Piscis Austrini (circled)

Observation data Epoch J2000.0 Equinox J2000.0 (ICRS)
- Constellation: Piscis Austrinus
- Right ascension: 22^{h} 08^{m} 25.93132^{s}
- Declination: −34° 02′ 37.8248″
- Apparent magnitude (V): +4.98

Characteristics
- Spectral type: K4 III
- B−V color index: +1.50

Astrometry
Radial velocity (R_{v})	+20.1 km/s
Proper motion (μ)	RA: +4.55 mas/yr Dec.: −49.02 mas/yr
Parallax (π)	7.69±0.22 mas
Distance	420 ± 10 ly (130 ± 4 pc)
Absolute magnitude (M_{V})	−0.47±0.062

Details
Mass	3.5 M_{☉}
Radius	39 R_{☉}
Luminosity	387 L_{☉}
Surface gravity (log g)	1.84 cgs
Temperature	4,066 K
Metallicity [Fe/H]	+0.06 dex
Rotational velocity (v sin i)	1.0±1.0 km/s
Age	301 Myr

Other designations
- υ PsA, CPD−34°9054, HD 210066, HIP 109289, HR 8433, SAO 213577

Database references
SIMBAD	data

Upsilon Piscis Austrini (υ Piscis Austrini) is a solitary, orange-hued star in the southern constellation of Piscis Austrinus. It is faintly visible to the naked eye with an apparent visual magnitude of +4.98. Based upon an annual parallax shift of 7.69 mas as seen from the Earth, the star is located 420 light-years from the Sun.

This is an evolved K-type giant star with a stellar classification of K4 III. It is catalogued as a member of the Wolf 630 moving group. Upsilon Piscis Austrini is moving through the galaxy at a speed of 36.4 km/s relative to the Sun. Its projected galactic orbit carries it between 17,700 and 25,400 light-years from the center of the galaxy.
