= Gamma Piscis Austrini =

Triple star system in the constellation Piscis Austrinus

- Location of γ Piscis Austrini (circled)

Observation data Epoch J2000.0 Equinox J2000.0 (ICRS)
- Constellation: Piscis Austrinus
- Right ascension: 22^{h} 52^{m} 31.5351^{s}
- Declination: −32° 52′ 31.806″
- Apparent magnitude (V): +4.448 (4.59 + 8.20)

Characteristics

γ PsA A
- Spectral type: A0 Vp(SrCrEu)
- U−B color index: −0.038
- B−V color index: −0.046

γ PsA B
- Spectral type: F5 V
- U−B color index: −0.08
- B−V color index: +0.44

Astrometry
Radial velocity (R_{v})	16.5±2.7 km/s
Proper motion (μ)	RA: −32.73 mas/yr Dec.: −21.21 mas/yr
Parallax (π)	15.14±0.57 mas
Distance	215 ± 8 ly (66 ± 2 pc)
Absolute magnitude (M_{V})	−0.20/3.50

Details

Aa
Mass	2.65 M_{☉}
Radius	2.9 R_{☉}
Surface gravity (log g)	3.92 cgs
Temperature	9,950 K
Rotation	2.542±0.001 d
Rotational velocity (v sin i)	47 km/s
Age	350 Myr

Ab
Mass	0.94 M_{☉}
Radius	0.84 R_{☉}
Temperature	5,500 K

B
Mass	1.20 M_{☉}
Radius	1.15 R_{☉}
Temperature	6,400 K

Other designations
- γ PsA, 22 Piscis Austrini, CD−33°16270, HD 216336, HIP 112948, HR 8695, SAO 214153, WDS J22525-3253AB

Database references
SIMBAD	γ PsA
- γ PsA A
- γ PsA B

Gamma Piscis Austrini, Latinized from γ Piscis Austrini, is three-star system in the southern constellation of Piscis Austrinus. It is visible to the naked eye with a combined apparent visual magnitude of +4.448. Based upon an annual parallax shift of 15.1 mas as seen from the Earth, the system is located about 216 light years from the Sun.

The A and B components, as of 2010, are separated by 4 arc seconds in the sky along a position angle of 255°. The "A" component is itself a binary, made up of two stars orbiting each other with an estimated orbital period of 15 years and a separation of nine astronomical units, with a combined apparent magnitude of 4.59. The component Aa has 2.65 times more mass than the Sun and 2.9 times its radius, being a chemically peculiar star with a spectral type A0 Vp(SrCrEu). The Ab component is smaller, at 0.94 times the Sun's mass and 0.84 times its radius. The fainter magnitude 8.20 companion, component B, is an F-type main sequence star with a class of F5 V. It has 20% more mass than the Sun and a radius 15% larger.

Gamma Piscis Austrini is moving through the Galaxy at a speed of 24.1 km/s relative to the Sun. Its projected Galactic orbit carries it between 21,605 and 30,903 light-years from the center of the Galaxy. It came closest to the Sun 1.8 million years ago at a distance of 157 light-years.

The current age of the system is 350 million years. It will become a triple white dwarf system within 14 billion years.

== Naming ==
In Chinese, 敗臼 (Bài Jiù), meaning Decayed Mortar, refers to an asterism consisting of refers to an asterism consisting of γ Piscis Austrini, γ Gruis, λ Gruis and 19 Piscis Austrini. Consequently, the Chinese name for γ Piscis Austrini itself is 敗臼三 (Bài Jiù sān, English: the Third Star of Decayed Mortar.)
