= Iota Piscis Austrini =

Star in the constellation Piscis Austrinus

ι Piscis Austrini
- Location of ι Piscis Austrini (circled)

Observation data Epoch J2000.0 Equinox J2000.0 (ICRS)
- Constellation: Piscis Austrinus
- Right ascension: 21^{h} 44^{m} 56.809^{s}
- Declination: −33° 01′ 32.82″
- Apparent magnitude (V): +4.35

Characteristics
- Evolutionary stage: main sequence
- Spectral type: A0 V or A0 III-IV
- U−B color index: −0.11
- B−V color index: −0.05

Astrometry
| Proper motion (μ) | RA: +31.10 mas/yr Dec.: −94.56 mas/yr |
| Parallax (π) | 15.97±0.17 mas |
| Distance | 204 ± 2 ly (62.6 ± 0.7 pc) |
| Absolute magnitude (M_{V}) | +0.37 |

Details
| Mass | 2.7 M_{☉} |
| Radius | 2.7 R_{☉} |
| Luminosity | 76 L_{☉} |
| Surface gravity (log g) | 4.00 cgs |
| Temperature | 10,376 K |
| Metallicity [Fe/H] | 0.00 dex |
| Rotational velocity (v sin i) | 50 km/s |
| Age | 292 Myr |

Other designations
- Baijiu, ι PsA, 9 PsA, CD−33°15734, CPD−33°6184, FK5 814, HD 206742, HIP 107380, HR 8305, SAO 213258, WDS J21449-3302A

Database references
| SIMBAD | data |

Iota Piscis Austrini, also named Baijiu /baɪjiuː/, is a solitary, blue-white hued star in the southern constellation of Piscis Austrinus. It has an apparent visual magnitude of +4.35 and is around 500 light years from the Sun. This is an A-type main sequence star with a stellar classification of A0 V. It has a magnitude 11.4 visual companion located at an angular separation of 20 arc seconds along a position angle of 290°, as of 1910.

Iota Piscis Austrini is moving through the Galaxy at a speed of 29.7 km/s relative to the Sun. Its projected Galactic orbit carries it between 18,400 and 24,300 light years from the center of the Galaxy.

== Naming ==
In Chinese astronomy, 天錢 (Tiān Qián), meaning Celestial Money, refers to an asterism consisting of ι Piscis Austrini, 13 Piscis Austrini, θ Piscis Austrini, μ Piscis Austrini and τ Piscis Austrini. Consequently, the Chinese name for ι Piscis Austrini itself is 天錢三 (Tiān Qián sān, English: the Third Star of Celestial Money.) However, many of the Chinese constellations have changed over time, and ι Piscis Austrini was originally part of Bài Jiù (Broken Mortar, 敗臼). The IAU Working Group on Star Names approved the name Baijiu for this star on 17 September 2026.
