= Gliese 887 =

Star in the constellation Piscis Austrinus

- Location of Gliese 887 in the constellation Piscis Austrinus

Observation data Epoch J2000 Equinox ICRS
- Constellation: Piscis Austrinus
- Right ascension: 23^{h} 05^{m} 52.03579^{s}
- Declination: −35° 51′ 11.0552″
- Apparent magnitude (V): 7.34

Characteristics
- Evolutionary stage: main sequence
- Spectral type: M0.5V
- U−B color index: +1.18
- B−V color index: +1.50
- Variable type: Suspected

Astrometry
| Radial velocity (R_{v}) | +8.31±0.13 km/s |
| Proper motion (μ) | RA: +6,765.995 mas/yr Dec.: +1,330.285 mas/yr |
| Parallax (π) | 304.1354±0.0200 mas |
| Distance | 10.7241 ± 0.0007 ly (3.2880 ± 0.0002 pc) |
| Absolute magnitude (M_{V}) | 9.8 |

Details
| Mass | 0.479+0.011 −0.010 M_{☉} |
| Radius | 0.474±0.008 R_{☉} |
| Luminosity | 0.0368±0.0006 L_{☉} |
| Habitable zone inner limit | 0.16 AU |
| Habitable zone outer limit | 0.40 AU |
| Surface gravity (log g) | 4.78 cgs |
| Temperature | 3,672+36 −34 K |
| Metallicity [Fe/H] | −0.22±0.09 dex |
| Rotation | 38.7±0.5 d |
| Rotational velocity (v sin i) | 1 km/s |
| Age | 4.57 Gyr |

Other designations
- Lacaille 9352, NSV 14420, CD−36°15693, GJ 887, HD 217987, HIP 114046, SAO 214301, LFT 1758, LHS 70, LTT 9348, PLX 5584, UGP 591, Cordoba 31353

Database references
| SIMBAD | data |
| Exoplanet Archive | data |
| ARICNS | data |

Gliese 887 (GJ 887), also Lacaille 9352 (Lac 9352), is a red dwarf star in the southern constellation of Piscis Austrinus. With an apparent visual magnitude of 7.34, this star is too faint to be viewed with the naked eye except possibly under excellent seeing conditions. Parallax measurements place it at a distance of about 10.72 light-years (3.29 parsecs) from Earth. It is the twelfth closest star system to the Solar System and is the closest star in the constellation Piscis Austrinus. Its closest neighbour is the EZ Aquarii triple star system at about 4.1 ly away.

== Properties ==
The neighborhood of the Solar System, which includes Gliese 887

This star has the fourth highest known proper motion, (which was first noticed by Benjamin Gould in 1881) moving a total of 6.9 arcseconds per year. However, this is still a very small movement overall, as there are 3,600 arcseconds in a degree of arc. The space velocity components of this star are (U, V, W) = (−93.9, −14.1, −51.4) km/s. If the radial velocity (V_{r}) equals +9.7 km/s then about 2,700 years ago Gliese 887 was at its minimal distance of approximately 10.63 ly (3.26 pc) from the Sun.

The spectrum of Gliese 887 places it at a stellar classification of M0.5V, indicating it is a type of main sequence star known as a red dwarf. This was the first red dwarf star to have its angular diameter measured, with the physical diameter being about 47% of the Sun's radius. It has around half the mass of the Sun and the outer envelope has an effective temperature of about 3,670 K.

== Planetary system ==
In June 2020, two super-Earth planets were reported, as well as a third candidate planet with a period of 50.7 days, located within the habitable zone. They were detected using the radial velocity method from observations with HARPS in Chile and HIRES in Hawaii. A 2026 follow-up study confirmed the 50-day planet and detected a fourth, Earth-mass planet closer to the star. A fifth candidate signal is also suspected. The habitable-zone planet, GJ 887 d, is the second-nearest known exoplanet in the habitable zone after Proxima Centauri b, though it is significantly more massive than Earth and its composition is unknown. It may be possible to characterize it with proposed direct imaging missions such as the Habitable Worlds Observatory.

Additionally, the star presents a difference in proper motion measurements taken by the Hipparcos and Gaia spacecraft, suggesting the possible presence of an outer giant planet.

The Gliese 887 planetary system
| Companion (in order from star) | Mass | Semimajor axis (AU) | Orbital period (days) | Eccentricity | Inclination (°) | Radius |
|---|---|---|---|---|---|---|
| f (unconfirmed) | ≥ 0.47±0.11 M_{🜨} | 0.0263±0.0009 | 2.2166±0.0001 | — | — | — |
| e | ≥ 1.46+0.19 −0.18 M_{🜨} | 0.0417+0.0014 −0.0015 | 4.4249±0.0001 | — | — | — |
| b | ≥ 3.9±0.5 M_{🜨} | 0.0683+0.0022 −0.0024 | 9.2619±0.0005 | 0.14±0.06 | — | — |
| c | ≥ 6.5+1.0 −0.9 M_{🜨} | 0.121+0.004 −0.005 | 21.784±0.004 | 0.17±0.06 | — | — |
| d | ≥ 6.1±1.4 M_{🜨} | 0.212+0.007 −0.008 | 50.77±0.05 | 0.25+0.20 −0.15 | — | — |

== See also ==
- List of nearest stars
- Lalande 21185
