= HD 207832 =

Star in the constellation Piscis Austrinus

Observation data Epoch J2000 Equinox ICRS
- Constellation: Piscis Austrinus
- Right ascension: 21^{h} 52^{m} 36.2810^{s}
- Declination: −26° 01′ 35.6133″
- Apparent magnitude (V): 8.79

Characteristics
- Evolutionary stage: main-sequence star
- Spectral type: G5V

Astrometry
Radial velocity (R_{v})	-16.481±0.185 km/s
Proper motion (μ)	RA: 129.310 mas/yr Dec.: -143.132 mas/yr
Parallax (π)	16.8897±0.0151 mas
Distance	193.1 ± 0.2 ly (59.21 ± 0.05 pc)

Details
Mass	1.08±0.01 M_{☉}
Radius	0.97±0.02 R_{☉}
Luminosity	0.78±0.09 L_{☉}
Surface gravity (log g)	4.61±0.04 cgs
Temperature	5764±15 K
Metallicity [Fe/H]	0.17±0.01 dex
Rotation	17.8 d
Age	0.74±0.62 Gyr

Other designations
- CD−26 15858, HIP 107985, TYC 6589-761-1, GSC 06956-00378, 2MASS J21523626-2601352

Database references
SIMBAD	data

HD 207832 is a G-type main-sequence star. Its surface temperature is 5764±15 K. HD 207832 is slightly enriched compared to the Sun in its concentration of heavy elements, with a metallicity Fe/H index of 0.17±0.01 and is much younger at an age of 0.74±0.62 billion years. Kinematically, it belongs to the thin disk of the Milky Way.

A multiplicity study in 2014 detected a candidate comoving stellar companion - a red dwarf star or brown dwarf with a spectral class M6.5, at a very wide projected separation of 38.57′ (2.0 light years)

== Planetary system ==
In 2012, two planets, named HD 207832 b and HD 207832 c, were discovered by the radial velocity method on wide, eccentric orbits. The planetary system would remain stable even if the planetary orbits are coplanar.

Although discovery of the inner planet was confirmed in 2018, the discovery of both planets was suspected to be a false positive in 2020, as newer radial velocity data do not support the existence of the planets.

The HD 207832 planetary system
Companion (in order from star)	Mass	Semimajor axis (AU)	Orbital period (days)	Eccentricity	Inclination (°)	Radius
b (unconfirmed)	≥ 0.56±0.091 M_{J}	0.586±0.032	160.07±0.23	0.197±0.053	—	—
c (unconfirmed)	≥0.73^{+0.18}_{−0.05} M_{🜨}	2.112^{+0.087}_{−0.045}	1155.7^{+71.9}_{−37.0}	0.27^{+0.22}_{−0.10}	—	—
