= Delta Piscis Austrini =

Star in the constellation Piscis Austrinus

- Location of δ Piscis Austrini (circled)

Observation data Epoch J2000.0 Equinox J2000.0 (ICRS)
- Constellation: Piscis Austrinus
- Right ascension: 22^{h} 55^{m} 56.90026^{s}
- Declination: −32° 32′ 22.6335″
- Apparent magnitude (V): +4.175 (4.18 + 9.86)

Characteristics

δ PsA A
- Evolutionary stage: red clump
- Spectral type: G8 III
- U−B color index: +0.72
- B−V color index: +0.94

δ PsA B
- Spectral type: G8 IV
- U−B color index: +0.77
- B−V color index: +0.67

Astrometry
| Radial velocity (R_{v}) | −11.60 km/s |
| Proper motion (μ) | RA: +11.499 ± 0.398 mas/yr Dec.: +32.641 ± 0.379 mas/yr |
| Parallax (π) | 18.9796±0.2558 mas |
| Distance | 172 ± 2 ly (52.7 ± 0.7 pc) |
| Absolute magnitude (M_{V}) | +0.636 |

Details

δ PsA A
| Mass | 2.07±0.07 M_{☉} |
| Radius | 10.31±0.19 R_{☉} |
| Luminosity | 58±2 L_{☉} |
| Surface gravity (log g) | 2.740±0.059 cgs |
| Temperature | 4,967±26 K |
| Metallicity [Fe/H] | −0.131±0.022 dex |
| Age | 3.74 Gyr |

B
| Mass | 0.716±0.056 M_{☉} |
| Radius | 0.695±0.048 R_{☉} |
| Luminosity | 0.269±0.008 L_{☉} |
| Temperature | 4,999±169 K |

Other designations
- δ PsA, 23 Piscis Austrini, CD−33°16303, HD 216763, HIP 113246, HR 8720, SAO 214189, WDS J22559-3232A

Database references
| SIMBAD | data |

Delta Piscis Austrini, Latinized from δ Piscis Austrini, is a yellow-hued star in the southern constellation of Piscis Austrinus. It is visible to the naked eye with an apparent visual magnitude of +4.175. There is a magnitude 9.86 common proper motion companion located at an angular separation of 5.2 arc seconds – the pair most likely form a binary star system. Based upon an annual parallax shift of 18.9796 mas as seen from the Gaia satellite, Delta Piscis Austrini is located 172 ± 2 light-years from the Sun.

The primary, component A, is an evolved G-type giant star with a stellar classification of G8 III. At the age of about 3.74 billion years it is a red clump star, which indicates it is generating energy through helium fusion at its core. The star has an estimated 2.1 times the mass of the Sun and 10.3 times the Sun's radius, radiating 58 times the solar luminosity from its photosphere at an effective temperature of 4,967 K.

Delta Piscis Austrini is moving through the Galaxy at a speed of 13.8 km/s relative to the Sun. Its projected Galactic orbit carries it between 24,048 and 35,430 light-years from the center of the Galaxy.

== Chinese name ==
The Chinese name for Delta Piscis Austrini is 天綱 (Tiān Gāng) meaning Materials for Making Tents, because this star is marking itself and stand alone in Materials for Making Tents asterism, Encampment mansion (see : Chinese constellation). 天綱 (Tiān Gāng) westernized into Tien Kang, meaning "the Heavenly Rope" in R.H. Allen's work, but the name is for the asterism consisting this star, β PsA and ζ PsA.
