= Mu Piscis Austrini =

Star in the constellation Piscis Austrinus

- Location of μ Piscis Austrini (circled)

Observation data Epoch J2000.0 Equinox J2000.0 (ICRS)
- Constellation: Piscis Austrinus
- Right ascension: 22^{h} 08^{m} 23.014777^{s}
- Declination: −32° 59′ 18.3783″
- Apparent magnitude (V): +4.49

Characteristics
- Spectral type: A1.5 IVn
- U−B color index: +0.02
- B−V color index: +0.08

Astrometry
Radial velocity (R_{v})	+11.6±2.8 km/s
Proper motion (μ)	RA: +71.315 mas/yr Dec.: −33.001 mas/yr
Parallax (π)	26.7542±0.4513 mas
Distance	122 ± 2 ly (37.4 ± 0.6 pc)
Absolute magnitude (M_{V})	+1.41

Details
Mass	2.06 M_{☉}
Luminosity	24.5 L_{☉}
Surface gravity (log g)	4.00 cgs
Temperature	9,034±307 K
Rotational velocity (v sin i)	307.7±4.7 km/s
Age	412 Myr

Other designations
- μ PsA, 14 Piscis Austrini, CPD−33°6221, FK5 832, HD 210049, HIP 109285, HR 8431, SAO 213576

Database references
SIMBAD	data

Mu Piscis Austrini, Latinized from μ Piscis Austrini, is a solitary, white-hued star in the southern constellation of Piscis Austrinus. It is visible to the naked eye with an apparent visual magnitude of +4.49. Based upon an annual parallax shift of 26.75 mas as seen from the Gaia space telescope, the star is located around 122±2 light years from the Sun.

This star has the spectrum of an A-type subgiant with a stellar classification of A1.5 IVn. It is spinning rapidly with a projected rotational velocity of 308 km/s. This is giving the star an oblate shape with an equatorial bulge that is an estimated 23% larger than the polar radius. An X-ray emission has been detected from this star with a luminosity of 89.6×10^{27} erg s^{−1}. This may be coming from an undiscovered companion, since A-type stars are not expected to be a significant source of X-rays.

Mu Piscis Austrini is moving through the Galaxy at a speed of 20 km/s relative to the Sun. Its projected Galactic orbit carries it between 23,800 and 28,500 light years from the center of the Galaxy. Mu Piscis Austrini came closest to the Sun 1.2 million years ago at a distance of 111 light years.

== Naming ==
In Chinese, 天錢 (Tiān Qián), meaning Celestial Money, refers to an asterism consisting of refers to an asterism consisting of μ Piscis Austrini, 13 Piscis Austrini, θ Piscis Austrini, ι Piscis Austrini and τ Piscis Austrini. Consequently, the Chinese name for μ Piscis Austrini itself is 天錢四 (Tiān Qián sì, English: the Fifth Star of Celestial Money.)
