= Eta Piscis Austrini =

Star in the constellation Piscis Austrinus

η Piscis Austrini
- Location of η Piscis Austrini (circled)

Observation data Epoch J2000.0 Equinox ICRS
- Constellation: Piscis Austrinus
- A
- Right ascension: 22^{h} 00^{m} 50.22454^{s}
- Declination: −28° 27′ 13.4587″
- Apparent magnitude (V): 5.78
- B
- Right ascension: 22^{h} 00^{m} 50.34936^{s}
- Declination: −28° 27′ 14.1460″
- Apparent magnitude (V): 6.80

Characteristics
- Spectral type: B6 III shell + B8.5 V
- U−B color index: −0.30
- B−V color index: −0.10
- Variable type: suspected

Astrometry
Absolute magnitude (M_{V})	−1.53

A
Proper motion (μ)	RA: +15.289 mas/yr Dec.: −0.096 mas/yr
Parallax (π)	3.8087±0.0932 mas
Distance	860 ± 20 ly (263 ± 6 pc)

B
Proper motion (μ)	RA: +17.554 mas/yr Dec.: −1.229 mas/yr
Parallax (π)	4.5342±0.3306 mas
Distance	720 ± 50 ly (220 ± 20 pc)

Details

η PsA A
Mass	4.01±0.18 M_{☉}
Luminosity	881 L_{☉}
Surface gravity (log g)	3.48 cgs
Temperature	12,310 K
Rotational velocity (v sin i)	320 km/s
Age	115 Myr

η PsA B
Mass	3.6 M_{☉}
Surface gravity (log g)	4.17 cgs
Temperature	14,144 K
Metallicity [Fe/H]	−0.21 dex

Other designations
- η PsA, 12 Piscis Austrini, CPD−29°6659, HD 209014, HIP 108661, HR 8386, SAO 190822, WDS J22008-2827AB

Database references
SIMBAD	data

Eta Piscis Austrini (η Piscis Austrini) is a binary star system in the southern constellation of Piscis Austrinus. As of 2000, the two components had an angular separation of 1.818 arc seconds along a position angle of 113.4°. The pair have a combined apparent visual magnitude of +5.43, which is bright enough to be seen with the naked eye. Based upon an annual parallax shift of 3.99 mas as seen from the Earth, the system is located roughly 820 light years from the Sun.

Although not catalogued formally as a variable star, brightness changes between magnitude 5,33 and 5.44 have been widely reported. The type of variability is thought to be related to its rapid rotation and a surrounding shell, and is tentatively given as a combination of a Be star and Maia variable.

The magnitude 5.8 primary, component A, is a blue-white hued Be star with a stellar classification B6 III. At 115 million years old, the star is spinning rapidly with a projected rotational velocity of 265. It has an estimated four times the mass of the Sun and is radiating 604 times the solar luminosity at an effective temperature of 11,272 K. The secondary, component B, has a visual magnitude of 6.8 and a spectral class of B8.5 V.
