= Beta Piscis Austrini =

Star in the constellation Piscis Austrinus

- Location of β Piscis Austrini (circled)

Observation data Epoch J2000.0 Equinox J2000.0 (ICRS)
- Constellation: Piscis Austrinus
- Right ascension: 22^{h} 31^{m} 30.33038^{s}
- Declination: −32° 20′ 45.8653″
- Apparent magnitude (V): +4.29

Characteristics
- Spectral type: A1 V
- U−B color index: +0.02
- B−V color index: +0.01

Astrometry
| Radial velocity (R_{v}) | 5.5±0.5 km/s |
| Proper motion (μ) | RA: +59.12 mas/yr Dec.: −18.83 mas/yr |
| Parallax (π) | 22.84±0.21 mas |
| Distance | 143 ± 1 ly (43.8 ± 0.4 pc) |
| Absolute magnitude (M_{V}) | 1.00 |

Details
| Mass | 2.20±0.03 M_{☉} |
| Radius | 2.20±0.21 (equatorial); 1.75 (polar) R_{☉} |
| Luminosity | 26.2+1.9 −2.4 L_{☉} |
| Surface gravity (log g) | 3.78+0.10 −0.13 (equatorial); 4.29±0.05 (polar) cgs |
| Temperature | 8,275+317 −400 (equatorial); 10,300+200 −250 (polar) K |
| Rotational velocity (v sin i) | 26 km/s |
| Age | 141+113 −49 Myr |

Other designations
- Tiangang, β PsA, 17 Piscis Austrini, CD−32°17126, FK5 1592, HD 213398, HIP 111188, HR 8576, SAO 213883, WDS J22315-3221A

Database references
| SIMBAD | data |
- companion

Beta Piscis Austrini, also named Tiangang /tiænˈɡæŋ/, is a star in the southern constellation of Piscis Austrinus that makes part of a binary star system. It is visible to the naked eye with an apparent visual magnitude of +4.29. Based upon an annual parallax shift of 22.84 mas as seen from the Earth, the star is located 143 light years from the Sun. These coordinates are a source of X-ray emission with a luminosity of 88.5×10^{20} W, which is most likely coming from an external source.

== Nomenclature ==
Beta Piscis Austrini is a Bayer designation that is Latinized from β Piscis Austrini, and abbreviated Beta PsA or β PsA.

In Chinese astronomy, Tiān Gāng (天綱, Celestial Rope) is a single-star asterism which represents ropes used to pitch tents. It has been identified with different stars over time, including Beta and Delta Piscis Austrini. R. H. Allen's Star Names (1899) described Tien Kang as including Beta, Delta, and Zeta. The IAU Working Group on Star Names approved the name Tiangang for Beta Piscis Austrini on 17 September 2026.

== Characteristics ==
Beta Piscis Austrini is a white-hued A-type main sequence star with a stellar classification of A1 V. It has an estimated 2.20 times the mass of the Sun and spins with a rather slow projected rotational velocity of 26 km/s. However, the stellar equator is seen nearly pole-on, yielding an equatorial rotational velocity of 314+37
−43 km/s. As a result of its fast rotation, it has an oval shape, with the equatorial circumference being 26%±7% longer than the polar circumference, as well as an equatorial temperature 20%±4% cooler than the polar temperature, due to gravity darkening. The star is radiating 26 times the solar luminosity from its photosphere.

The star is moving through the Galaxy at a speed of 14.4 km/s relative to the Sun. Its projected Galactic orbit carries it between 23,901 and 28,366 light-years from the center of the Galaxy.

There is evidence for an infrared excess, indicating the presence of an orbiting debris disk. This has an estimated temperature of 188 K, indicating an orbital distance of 12 AU from the host star.

Beta Piscis Austrini has a proper motion companion named CD-32°17127, of apparent magnitude 7.04. It is a G-type main-sequence star of spectral class G1V, with 1.04 times the mass of the Sun, 1.03 times the Sun's radius, a luminosity 1.22 times solar and an effective temperature of 6,000 K. This star is separated from β Piscis Austrini by 1,376 astronomical units.
