= Zeta Piscis Austrini =

Star in the constellation Piscis Austrinus

Observation data Epoch J2000.0 Equinox J2000.0 (ICRS)
- Constellation: Piscis Austrinus
- Right ascension: 22^{h} 30^{m} 53.77310^{s}
- Declination: −26° 04′ 25.5041″
- Apparent magnitude (V): +6.43

Characteristics
- Spectral type: K1 III
- B−V color index: +1.08

Astrometry
Radial velocity (R_{v})	−23.40±0.12 km/s
Proper motion (μ)	RA: +40.647 mas/yr Dec.: −74.044 mas/yr
Parallax (π)	7.9457±0.0243 mas
Distance	410 ± 1 ly (125.9 ± 0.4 pc)
Absolute magnitude (M_{V})	+0.83

Details
Mass	2.9 M_{☉}
Radius	11 R_{☉}
Luminosity	50 L_{☉}
Surface gravity (log g)	2.50 cgs
Temperature	4,732 K
Metallicity [Fe/H]	−0.09 dex
Rotational velocity (v sin i)	1.6 km/s
Age	410 Myr

Other designations
- ζ PsA, NSV 14180, CD−26°16175, CPD−26°7379, FK5 5986, HD 213296, HIP 111138, HR 8570, SAO 191196

Database references
SIMBAD	data

Zeta Piscis Austrini, Latinized from ζ Piscis Austrini, is an orange-hued star in the southern constellation of Piscis Austrinus. It has an apparent visual magnitude of +6.43, which is near the lower limit of stars that can be seen with the naked eye. Based upon an annual parallax shift of 7.55 mas as seen from the Gaia telescope, the star is located 410±1 light years from the Sun. This is an evolved K-type giant star with a stellar classification of K1 III. It is a suspected variable star.
