= Piscis Austrinus =

Constellation in the southern celestial hemisphere

- Constellation
- List of stars in Piscis Austrinus
- Abbreviation: PsA
- Genitive: Piscis Austrini
- Pronunciation: /ˈpaɪsɪs ɒsˈtraɪnəs/ or /ɒsˈtreɪlɪs/, genitive /ˈpaɪsɪs ɒˈstraɪnaɪ/
- Symbolism: the Southern Fish
- Right ascension: 21^{h} 27^{m} 13.8661^{s}–23^{h} 06^{m} 54.6033^{s}
- Declination: −24.8250446°–−36.4592972°
- Quadrant: SQ4
- Area: 245 sq. deg. (60th)
- Main stars: 7
- Bayer/Flamsteed stars: 21
- Stars brighter than 3.00^{m}: 1
- Stars within 10.00 pc (32.62 ly): 3
- Brightest star: Fomalhaut (α PsA) (1.16^{m})
- Nearest star: Lacaille 9352
- Messier objects: 0
- Meteor showers: ?
- Bordering constellations: Capricornus; Microscopium; Grus; Sculptor; Aquarius
- Visible at latitudes between +55° and −90°. Best visible at 21:00 (9 p.m.) during the month of October.

Piscis Austrinus is a constellation in the southern celestial hemisphere. The name is Latin for "the southern fish", in contrast with the larger constellation Pisces, which represents a pair of fish. Before the 20th century, it was also known as Piscis Notius. Piscis Austrinus was one of the 48 constellations listed by the 2nd-century astronomer Ptolemy, and it remains one of the 88 modern constellations. The stars of the modern constellation Grus once formed the "tail" of Piscis Austrinus. In 1597 (or 1598), Petrus Plancius carved out a separate constellation and named it after the crane.

It is a faint constellation, containing only one star brighter than 4th magnitude: Fomalhaut, which is 1st magnitude and the 18th-brightest star in the night sky. Fomalhaut is surrounded by a circumstellar disk, and possibly hosts a planet. Other objects contained within the boundaries of the constellation include Lacaille 9352, one of the brightest red dwarf stars in the night sky (though still too faint to see with the naked eye); and PKS 2155-304, a BL Lacertae object that is one of the optically brightest blazars in the sky.

== History ==
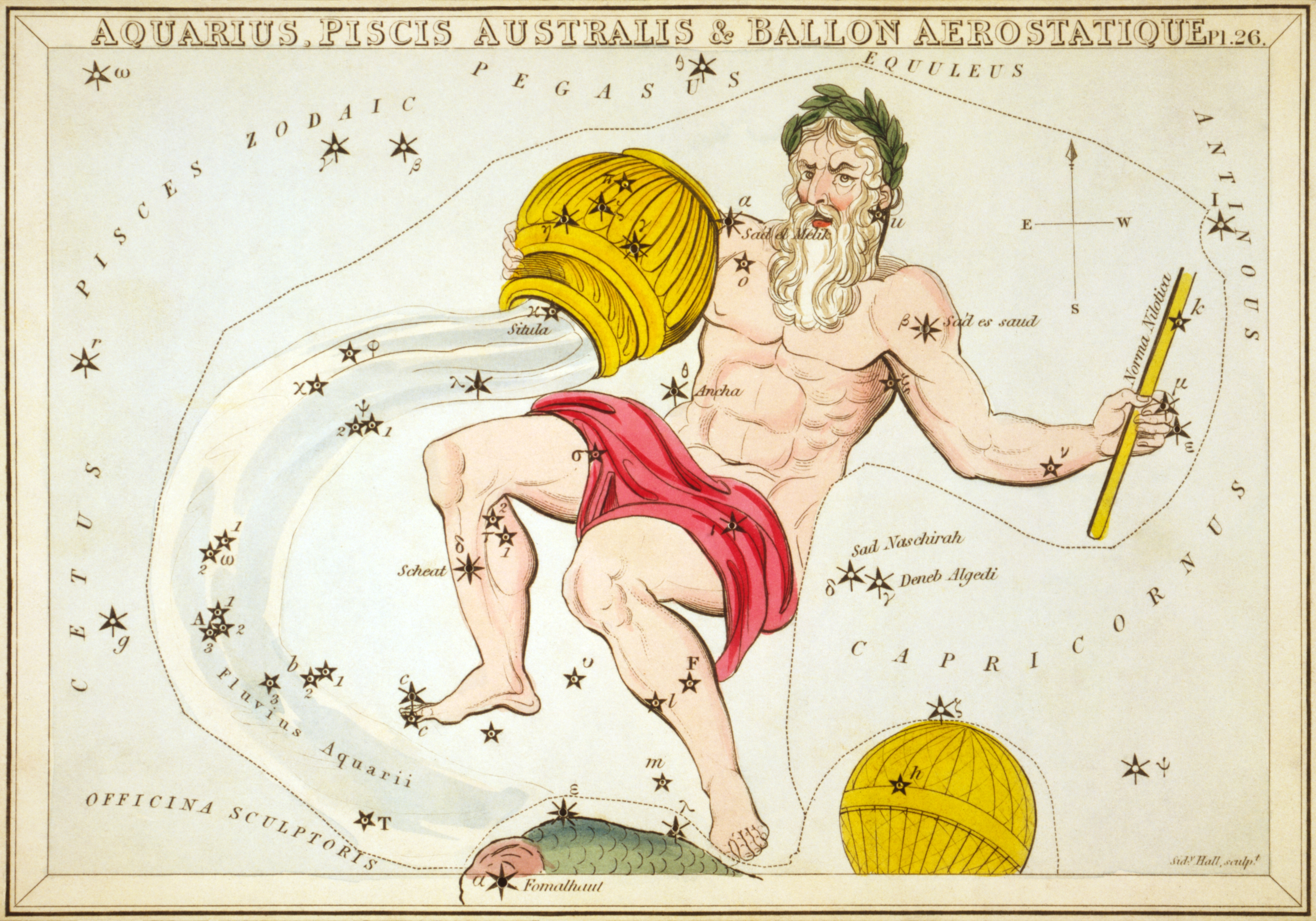
Piscis Austrinus can be seen cut off at the bottom of Urania's Mirror's 1825 depiction of Aquarius. Next to it is the obsolete constellation Ballon Aerostatique.

Pisces Austrinus originated with the Babylonian constellation simply known as the Fish (MUL.KU). Professor of astronomy Bradley Schaefer has proposed that ancient observers must have been able to see as far south as Mu Piscis Austrini to define a pattern that looked like a fish. Like many of Schaefer's proposals this is nothing new: mu PsA is explicitly mentioned in the Almagest and the constellation is definitely a takeover from ancient Babylon. Along with the eagle Aquila the crow Corvus and water snake Hydra, Piscis Austrinus was introduced to the Ancient Greeks around 500 BCE; the constellations marked the summer and winter solstices, respectively.

In Greek mythology, this constellation is known as the Great Fish and it is portrayed as swallowing the water being poured out by Aquarius, the water-bearer constellation. The two fish of the constellation Pisces are said to be the offspring of the Great Fish. In Egyptian mythology, this fish saved the life of the Egyptian goddess Isis, so she placed this fish and its descendants into the heavens as constellations of stars. In the 5th century BC, Greek historian Ctesias wrote that the fish was said to have lived in a lake near Bambyce in Syria and had saved Derceto, daughter of Aphrodite, and for this deed was placed in the heavens. For this reason, fish were sacred and not eaten by many Syrians.

== Characteristics ==
Piscis Austrinus is a constellation bordered by Capricornus to the northwest, Microscopium to the southwest, Grus to the south, Sculptor to the east, and Aquarius to the north. Its recommended three-letter abbreviation, as adopted by the International Astronomical Union in 1922, is "PsA". Ptolemy called the constellation Ichthus Notios "Southern Fish" in his Almagest; this was Latinised to Piscis Notius and used by German celestial cartographers Johann Bayer and Johann Elert Bode. Bayer also called it Piscis Meridianus and Piscis Austrinus, while French astronomer Nicolas-Louis de Lacaille called it Piscis Australis. English Astronomer Royal John Flamsteed went with Piscis Austrinus, which was followed by most subsequently. The official constellation boundaries, as set by Belgian astronomer Eugène Delporte in 1930, are defined by a polygon of four segments (illustrated in infobox). In the equatorial coordinate system, the right ascension coordinates of these borders lie between 21^{h} 27.3^{m} and 23^{h} 06.5^{m} , while the declination coordinates are between −24.83° and −36.46°. The whole constellation is visible to observers south of latitude 53°N. (Note: While parts of the constellation technically rise above the horizon to observers between 53°N and 65°N, stars within a few degrees of the horizon are to all intents and purposes unobservable.)

== Features ==
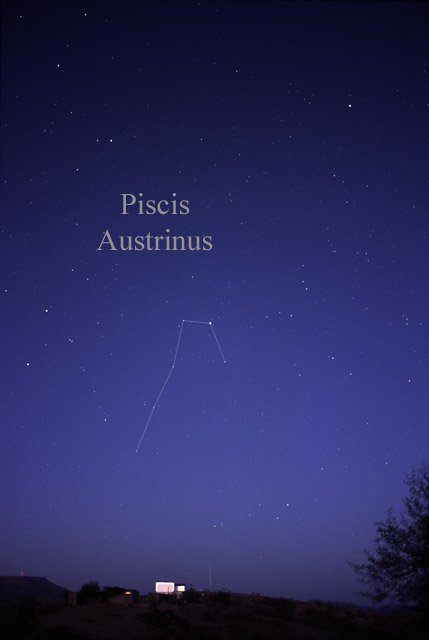
The constellation Piscis Austrinus as it can be seen by the naked eye

=== Stars ===
Ancient astronomers counted twelve stars as belonging to Piscis Austrinus, though one was later incorporated into nearby Grus as Gamma Gruis. Other stars became part of Microscopium. Bayer used the Greek letters alpha through mu to label the most prominent stars in the constellation. Ptolemy had catalogued Fomalhaut (Alpha Piscis Austrini) as belonging to both this constellation and Aquarius. Lacaille redrew the constellation as it was poorly visible from Europe, adding nu and pi, and relabelling gamma, delta and epsilon as epsilon, eta and gamma, respectively. Nu Pisicis Austrini was dropped by Baily as he felt it was too dim. However, Baily and Gould did not uphold these changes as Bayer's original chart was fairly accurate. Bode added tau and upsilon. Flamsteed gave 24 stars Flamsteed designations, though the first four numbered became part of Microscopium. Within the constellation's borders, there are 47 stars brighter than or equal to apparent magnitude 6.5. (Note: Objects of magnitude 6.5 are among the faintest visible to the unaided eye in suburban-rural transition night skies.)

Traditionally representing the mouth of the fish, Fomalhaut is the brightest star in the constellation and the 18th-brightest star in the night sky, with an apparent magnitude of 1.16. Located 25.13 ± 0.09 light-years away, it is a white main-sequence star that is 1.92 ± 0.02 times as massive and 16.63 ± 0.48 as luminous as the Sun. Its companion Fomalhaut b was thought to be the first extrasolar planet ever detected by a visible light image, thanks to the Hubble Space Telescope, but infrared observations have since retracted this claim: it is instead a spherical cloud of dust. TW Piscis Austrini can be seen close by and is possibly associated with Fomalhaut as it lies within a light-year of it. Of magnitude 6.5, it is a BY Draconis variable.

The second-brightest star in the constellation, Epsilon Piscis Austrini is a blue-white star of magnitude +4.17. Located 400 ± 20 light-years distant, it is a blue-white main-sequence star 4.10 ± 0.19 times as massive as the Sun, and around 661 times as luminous.

Beta, Delta and Zeta constitute the Tian Gang ("Celestial Rope") in China. Beta is a white main-sequence star of apparent magnitude 4.29 that is of similar size and luminosity to Fomalhaut but five times as remote, at around 143 ± 1 light-years distant from Earth. Delta Piscis Austrini is a double star with components of magnitude 4.2 and 9.2. The brighter is a yellow giant of spectral type G8 III. It is a red clump star that is burning helium in its core. It is 172 ± 2 light-years distant from Earth. Zeta Piscis Austrini is an orange giant star of spectral type K1III that is located 413 ± 2 light-years distant from Earth. It is a suspected variable star.

S Piscis Austrini is a long-period Mira-type variable red giant which ranges between magnitude 8.0 and 14.5 over a period of 271.7 days, and V Piscis Austrini is a semi-regular variable ranging between magnitudes 8.0 and 9.0 over 148 days.

Lacaille 9352 is a faint red dwarf star of spectral type M0.5V that is just under half the Sun's diameter and mass. A mere 10.74 light-years away, it is too dim to be seen with the naked eye at magnitude 7.34. In June 2020 two super-Earth planets were discovered via radial velocity method.

Exoplanets have been discovered in five other star systems in the constellation. HD 205739 is a yellow-white main-sequence star of spectral type F7 V that has a planet around 1.37 times as massive as Jupiter orbiting it with a period of 279 days, and a suggestion of a second planet. HD 216770 is an orange dwarf accompanied by a Jupiter-like planet every 118 days. HD 207832 is a star of spectral type G5V with a diameter and mass about 90% of that of the Sun, and around 77% of its luminosity. Two gas giant planets with masses around 56% and 73% that of Jupiter were discovered in 2012 via the radial velocity method. With orbits of 162 and 1156 days, they average around 0.57 and 2.11 astronomical units away from their star.

WASP-112 and WASP-124 are two sun-like stars that have planets discovered by transit.

=== Deep-sky objects ===
NGC 7172 and NGC 7314 are three galaxies of magnitudes 11.9, 12.5 and 10.9, respectively. NGC 7259 is another spiral galaxy, which hosted a supernova—SN 2009ip—in 2009.

At redshift z = 0.116, the BL Lacertae object PKS 2155-304 is one of the brightest blazars in the sky.

== See also ==
- Piscis Austrinus in Chinese astronomy
