= HD 212301 b =

Extrasolar planet in the constellation Octans

Discovery
- Discovered by: Lo Curto et al.
- Discovery site: La Silla Observatory
- Discovery date: August 22, 2005
- Detection method: Doppler spectroscopy

Orbital characteristics
- Apastron: 0.0341 AU (5,100,000 km)
- Periastron: 0.0341 AU (5,100,000 km)
- Semi-major axis: 0.0341 AU (5,100,000 km)
- Eccentricity: 0
- Orbital period (sidereal): 2.24572 ± 28 d 53.897 h
- Average orbital speed: 166
- Time of periastron: 2453549.195 ± 0.004
- Argument of periastron: 0
- Semi-amplitude: 59.5 ± 0.7
- Star: HD 212301

HD 212301 b is an extrasolar planet located approximately 172 light-years (53 parsecs) away in the constellation of Octans, orbiting the star HD 212301. It has an orbital period of 2.25 Earth days. The orbital distance is 0.0341 astronomical units or 5.10 gigameters.

On August 22, 2005, taking place in ESO La Silla Observatory in Chile, the planet was discovered by Lo Curto who used the HARPS spectrometer.

== See also ==
- HD 213240 b
