= HD 212301 =

Star in the constellation Octans

Observation data Epoch J2000 Equinox ICRS
- Constellation: Octans
- Right ascension: 22^{h} 27^{m} 30.92159^{s}
- Declination: −77° 43′ 04.5298″
- Apparent magnitude (V): 7.76

Characteristics
- Spectral type: F8V + M3V
- B−V color index: 0.560±0.010

Astrometry
Radial velocity (R_{v})	+4.69±0.01 km/s
Proper motion (μ)	RA: 76.862±0.051 mas/yr Dec.: −92.203±0.055 mas/yr
Parallax (π)	18.4109±0.0290 mas
Distance	177.2 ± 0.3 ly (54.32 ± 0.09 pc)
Absolute magnitude (M_{V})	4.06

Details

A
Mass	1.20 M_{☉}
Radius	1.23+0.04 −0.02 R_{☉}
Luminosity	1.911±0.005 L_{☉}
Surface gravity (log g)	4.35 cgs
Temperature	6169±37 K
Metallicity [Fe/H]	0.13±0.02 dex
Rotational velocity (v sin i)	5.44 km/s
Age	4.2+1.1 −1.4 Gyr

B
Mass	0.35±0.02 M_{☉}

Other designations
- CPD−78° 1011, GC 31330, HD 212301, HIP 110852, SAO 258040, WDS J20379-6038AB

Database references
SIMBAD	data

HD 212301 is a binary star system in the south circumpolar constellation of Octans. This star is also called HIP 110852. With an apparent visual magnitude of 7.76, it is too faint to be visible to the naked eye. The system is located at a distance of 177 light years from the Sun based on parallax, and is drifting further away with a radial velocity of +4.7 km/s. It has an absolute magnitude of 4.06.

The primary, component A, is an F-type main-sequence star with a stellar classification of F8V. It has 20% greater mass than the Sun and a 23% larger radius. Its age is about the same as the Sun and it is spinning with a projected rotational velocity of 5.4 km/s. It is a metal-rich star with 50% more metals than the Sun has. The star is radiating 1.9 times the luminosity of the Sun from its photosphere at an effective temperature of 6,169 K.

A secondary companion was announced in 2009. This faint star is located at an angular separation of 4.4″ to the northwest of the primary, corresponding to a projected separation of ~230 AU. This is a red dwarf with an estimated class of M3V and a mass equal to around 35% of the mass of the Sun. The pair share a common proper motion.

A hot jupiter candidate exoplanet was discovered orbiting the primary, based on radial velocity observations taken in 2003 and 2005.

The HD 212301 planetary system
Companion (in order from star)	Mass	Semimajor axis (AU)	Orbital period (days)	Eccentricity	Inclination (°)	Radius
b	>0.45 M_{J}	0.036	2.245715±0.000028	0.0 (fixed)	—	—

== See also ==
- HD 213240
- List of extrasolar planets
