= HD 213240 b =

Extrasolar planet in the constellation Grus

Discovery
- Discovered by: Santos et al.
- Discovery site: Geneva Extrasolar Planet Search
- Discovery date: April 4, 2001
- Detection method: Doppler spectroscopy

Orbital characteristics
- Semi-major axis: 1.92±0.026 AU
- Eccentricity: 0.4201+0.01 −0.0093
- Orbital period (sidereal): 879±3 d 2.4071+0.008 −0.0083 yr
- Average orbital speed: 23.7
- Inclination: 63°+17° −20° or 117°+20° −17°
- Longitude of ascending node: 145°+21° −121°
- Time of periastron: 2455901±12
- Argument of periastron: 201.9°+1.4° −1.5°
- Semi-amplitude: 96.6 ± 2.0
- Star: HD 213240

Physical characteristics
- Mass: 5.21+1.5 −0.49 M_{J}

HD 213240 b is an exoplanet located 134 light-years (41 parsecs) from the Solar System in the constellation of Grus. It is a gas giant orbiting the G-type star HD 213240.

The planet was discovered in 2001 as part of the CORALIE extra-solar planet search program. It was described in a 2001 publication by astronomers N. C. Santos, M. Mayor, D. Naef, F. Pepe, D. Queloz, S. Udry and M. Burnet of Observatoire de Genève, Switzerland. Doppler spectroscopy was used. In 2023, the inclination and true mass of HD 213240 b were determined via astrometry.

== See also ==
- HD 212301 b
- Methods of detecting extrasolar planets
