= HD 213240 =

Possible binary star system in the constellation Grus

Observation data Epoch J2000 Equinox ICRS
- Constellation: Grus
- Right ascension: 22^{h} 31^{m} 00.36634^{s}
- Declination: −49° 25′ 59.7690″
- Apparent magnitude (V): 6.81

Characteristics
- Spectral type: G0/G1V + M5-5.5
- B−V color index: 0.603±0.005

Astrometry
Radial velocity (R_{v})	−0.37±0.12 km/s
Proper motion (μ)	RA: −135.912 mas/yr Dec.: −193.844 mas/yr
Parallax (π)	24.4247±0.0208 mas
Distance	133.5 ± 0.1 ly (40.94 ± 0.03 pc)
Absolute magnitude (M_{V})	3.77

Details
Mass	1.57±0.02 M_{☉}
Radius	1.56+0.03 −0.04 R_{☉}
Luminosity	2.687+0.007 −0.006 L_{☉}
Surface gravity (log g)	4.17±0.02 cgs
Temperature	5,921+70 −58 K
Metallicity [Fe/H]	0.14±0.01 dex
Rotational velocity (v sin i)	3.5 km/s
Age	4.6±0.6 Gyr

Other designations
- CD−50° 13701, HD 213240, HIP 111143, SAO 231175, LTT 9047

Database references
SIMBAD	data

HD 213240 is a possible binary star system in the constellation Grus. It has an apparent visual magnitude of 6.81, which lies below the limit of visibility for normal human sight. The system is located at a distance of 133.5 light years from the Sun based on parallax. The primary has an absolute magnitude of 3.77.

This is an ordinary G-type main-sequence star with a stellar classification of G0/G1V. It is a metal-rich star with an age that has been calculated as being anywhere from 2.7 to 4.6 billion years. The star has 1.6 times the mass of the Sun and 1.56 times the Sun's radius. It is spinning with a projected rotational velocity of 3.5 km/s. The star is radiating 2.69 times the luminosity of the Sun from its photosphere at an effective temperature of 5,921 K.

A red dwarf companion star was detected in 2005 with a projected separation of 3,898 AU.

== Planetary system ==
The Geneva extrasolar planet search team discovered a planet orbiting this star in 2001. Since this planet was discovered by radial velocity, only its minimum mass was initially known, and there was a 5% chance of it being massive enough to be a brown dwarf. In 2023, the inclination and true mass of HD 213240 b were determined via astrometry, confirming its planetary nature.

The HD 213240 planetary system
Companion (in order from star)	Mass	Semimajor axis (AU)	Orbital period (years)	Eccentricity	Inclination (°)	Radius
b	5.21+1.5 −0.49 M_{J}	1.92±0.026	2.4071+0.008 −0.0083	0.4201+0.01 −0.0093	63+17 −20 or 117+20 −17	—

== See also ==
- HD 212301
- List of extrasolar planets
