= List of Arabic star names =

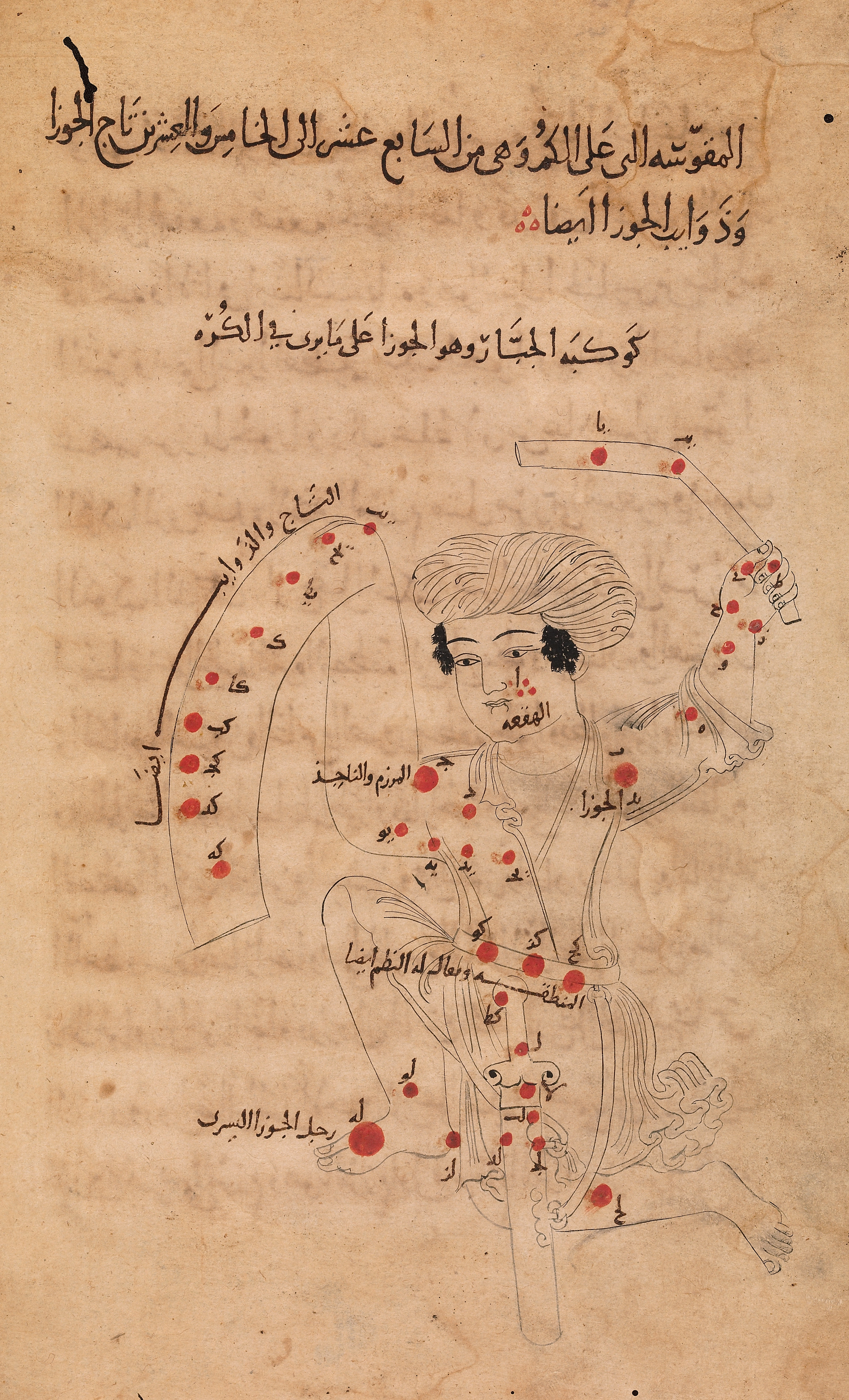
The Book of Fixed Stars, a 10th-century synthesis of the comprehensive star catalogue in Ptolemy’s Almagest with local Arabic astronomical traditions on the constellations (notably the constellation system of the Anwāʾ). This page shows Orion (al-Jabbār, "the giant"). The star Rigel in his foot derives its name from the Arabic rijl, "foot."

This is a list of Arabic star names. In Western astronomy, most of the accepted star names are Arabic, a few are Greek and some are of unknown origin. Typically only bright stars have names.

== History of Arabic star names ==
Very old star names originated among people who lived in the Arabian Peninsula more than a thousand years ago, after the rise of Islam. However, some Arabic-language star names sprang up later in history, as translations of ancient Greek-language descriptions.

The astronomer Claudius Ptolemy in his Almagest (2nd century) tabulated the celestial position and brightness (visual magnitude) of 1,025 stars. Ptolemy's book was translated into Arabic in the 8th and 9th centuries and became famous in Europe as a 12th-century Latin translation. Many of the Arabic-language star descriptions in the Almagest came to be widely used as names for stars.

Ptolemy used a strategy of "figure reference" to identify stars according to their position within a familiar constellation or asterism (e.g., "in the right shoulder of The Hunter"). Muslim astronomers adopted some of these as proper names for stars, and added names from traditional Arabic star lore, which they recorded in various Zij treatises. The most notable of these is the Book of Fixed Stars written by the Muslim astronomer Abd al-Rahman al-Sufi (known as Azophi in the West), who thoroughly illustrated all the stars known to him along with their observations, descriptions, positions, magnitudes, brightness, and color.

In Europe, during the Middle Ages and Renaissance, many ancient star names were copied or translated incorrectly by various writers, some of whom did not know the Arabic language very well. As a result, the history of a star's name can be complicated.

In 2016, the IAU designated official star names to resolve the difficulty of using different naming systems. Many stars were given the commonly used Arabic name.

== List ==
=== A ===
Common name	Arabic name (transliteration)	Meaning	Arabic name	Arabic name (vowels)	Scientific star name
Acamar	Ākhir an-Nahr	the River's or Stream's End / Tail / Edge / Border	آخر النهر	آخِرُ ٱلْنََهْر	Theta Eridani
Achernar	Ākhir an-Nahr	the River's or Stream's End / Tail / Edge / Border	آخر النهر	آخِرُ ٱلْنََهْر	Alpha Eridani
Acrab	ʿAqrab	the Scorpion	عقرب	عَقْرَب	Beta Scorpii
Acubens	az-Zubānā	the Claw / Dart / Sting	الزبانى	الْزُّبَانَى	Alpha Cancri
Adhafera	aḍ-Ḍafīrah	the Braid / Curl / Strand (of the lion's mane)	الضفيرة	الْضَّفِيرَة	Zeta Leonis
Adhara	al-ʿAdhārā	the Virgin / Nymph	العذارى	الْعَذَارَى	Epsilon Canis Majoris A
Adhil	adh-Dhayl	the Tail / Annex	الذيل	الْذَيْل	Xi Andromedae
Adib	adh-Dhiʾb	the Wolf	الذئب	الْذِّئْب	Alpha Draconis, "Thuban"
Ain	ʿAyn	the Eye (of the bull)	عين	عَيْن	Epsilon Tauri
Aladfar	al-Uẓfūr	the Talons (of the Swooping Eagle)	الأظفر	أُظْفُور	Eta Lyrae
Alawaid	al-ʿAwāʾidh	the Protecting Mother Camels; the Old Camels; "the Four"	الربع, العوائذ	الْرُّبَع, الْعَوَائِذ	Gamma Draconis, Xi Draconis, Nu Draconis, Beta Draconis
Albali	al-Bāliʿ	the Swallower	البالع	البَالِع	Epsilon Aquarii
Alchibah	al-Khibāʾ	the Tent	الخباء	الخِبَاء	Alpha Corvi
Alcor	al-Khawār	the Faint One	الخوار	الخوار	80 Ursae Majoris
Aldebaran	ad-Dabarān	the Follower (of the Pleiades)	الدبران	اَلدَّبَرَان	Alpha Tauri
Alderamin	adh-Dhirāʿ al-Yamīn	the Right Arm (of Cepheus)	الذراع اليمين	الذّراع اليَمِين	Alpha Cephei
Aldhibah	aḍ-Ḍibāʿ	the Hyenas	الضباع	الْضِّبَاع	Zeta Draconis
Aldhanab	adh-Dhanab	the tail	الذنب	ال ذنب	Gamma Gruis
Aldhibain	adh-Dhiʾbayn	the Two Hyenas / Wolves	الذئبين	الْذِّئْبَيْن	Zeta Draconis (Aldhibah), Eta Draconis
Aldulfin	Dhanab ad-Dulfīn	the Dolphin's Tail	الذنب الدلفين	الذَّنَبُ الدُّلْفِين	Epsilon Delphini
Alfarasalkamil	al-Faras al-Kāmil	the Complete Horse	الفرس الكامل	الفرس الكامل	Omicron Andromedae
Alfirk	al-Firqah	the Flock of sheep	الفرقة	الفِرْقَة	Beta Cephei
Algebar	(Rijl) al-Jabbār	(Foot of) the Giant	رجل الجبار	رَجْلَ الجَبَّار	Beta Orionis, "Rigel"
Algedi	al-Jady	the Goat	الجدي	الجَدْي	Alpha^{2} Capricorni
Algenib	al-Janb	the Flank (of Pegasus)	الجنب	الجَنْب	Gamma Pegasi
Algieba	al-Jabhah	the Forehead (of the Lion)	الجبهة	الجَبْهَة	Gamma Leonis
Algol	(Raʾs) al-Ghūl	(Head of) the Ghoul	رأس الغول	رَأسَ الغُول	Beta Persei, the "Demon Star"
Algorab	al-Ghurāb	the Crow	الغراب	الغُرَاب	Delta Corvi
Alhena	al-Hanʿah	the Brand (on the neck of the camel)	الهنعة	الهَنْعَة	Gamma Geminorum, "Almeisan"
Alioth	al-Jawn	The black horse "John"	الجون	الجَوْن	Epsilon Ursae Majoris
Alkaid	al-Qāʾid (Banāt Naʿsh)	the Leader (of the mourning maidens)	القائد بنات نعش	القائِد بَنات نَعْش	Eta Ursae Majoris
Alkes	al-Kaʾs	the Cup	الكأس	الکَأْس	Alpha Crateris
Almak, Almach	ʿAnāq al-Arḍ	the Caracal, Desert Lynx; "She-kid, She-Goat of the land"	عناق الأرض	عَنَاقِ ٱلْأَرْض	Gamma Andromedae
Almeisan	al-Maysān	the Shining one	الميسان	المَيْسَان	Gamma Geminorum, "Alhena"
Almighzal	al-Mighzal	the Wool spindle	المِغْزَل	المِغْزَل	Eta Cygni
Alnaamaat	an-Naʿāmāt	the Hen Ostriches	النَّعَامَات	النعامات	Upsilon Ceti
Alnair	an-Nayyir	the Bright one	النير	النّيّر	Alpha Gruis
Alnasl	an-Naṣl	the Blade	النصل	النَّصْل	Gamma² Sagittarii
Alnilam	an-Naẓm	the String of Pearls	النظم	النَّظْم	Epsilon Orionis
Alnitak	an-Niṭāq	the Girdle (Orion's Belt)	النطاق	النِّطَاق	Zeta Orionis
Alphard	al-Fard	the Solitary one	الفرد	الفَرْد	Alpha Hydrae
Alphecca	(Nayyir) al-Fakkah	(the Bright one of) the Broken (Ring)	نير الفكة	نَيِّر الفَکَّة	Alpha Coronae Borealis
Alpheratz	(Surrat) al-Faras	(Navel of) the Mare	سرة الفرس	سُرَّة الفَرَس	Alpha Andromedae
Alqiladah	al-Qilādah	the Necklace	القِلادَة	القِلادَة	Omicron Sagittarii
Alqubba	al-Qubbah	the Dome or Domed tent	القُبَّة	القُبَّة	Beta Coronae Australis
Alruba	ar-Rubaʿ	the foal	الربع	الرُّبع	HD 161693, HR 6618
Alrumh	ar-Rumḥ	the lance	الرُّمْح	الرُّمْح	34 Boötis
Alrescha	ar-Rishāʾ	the Well-Rope	الرشاء	الرِّشَاء	Alpha Piscium
Alsafi	aṣ-Ṣāfī	the Tripods	الصافيّ	الْصَّافِيّ	Sigma Draconis
Alsamaka	as-Samakah	the Smaller Fish	السمكة الصغرى	السمكة	Beta Lacertae
Alsuhail	Suhayl	Glorious	سهيل	سّهَيْل	any of: Canopus, Velorum, or Lambda Velorum
Altair	(an-Nisr) aṭ-Ṭāʾir	the Flying (Eagle)	النسر الطائر	النَّسْر الطَّائِر	Alpha Aquilae
Altais	at-Tays	the Goat	التيس	التَّيْس	Delta Draconis
Alterf	aṭ-Ṭarf	the View (of the Lion)	الطرف	الطَّرْف	Lambda Leonis
Aludra	al-ʿUdhrah	Virginity	العذرة	العُذْرَة	Eta Canis Majoris
Alula Australis, Alula Borealis	(al-Qafzah) al-Ūlā	the First (Leap)	القفزة الأولى		Xi Ursae Majoris and Nu Ursae Majoris
Alwasl	al-Waṣl	the Joint or Connection	الوَصْل	الوصل	HD 171034
Alya	al-Alyah	the fatty Tail of a sheep	الألية		Theta Serpentis
Alsephina	as-Safīnah	the ship	السفينة		Delta Velorum
Angetenar	ʿArjat an-Nahr	Curve of the River	عرجة النهر		Tau² Eridani
Ankaa	al-ʿAnqāʾ	Anqa, Phoenix	العنقاء		Alpha Phoenicis
Arkab	al-ʿUrqūb	the Hamstring	العرقوب		Beta Sagittarii
Arneb	al-Arnab	the Hare	الأرنب		Alpha Leporis
Arrakis	ar-Rāqiṣ	the Dancer; Trotting Camel	الراقص	الْرَّاقِص	Alrakis
Asuia	ash-Shujāʿ	the Hydra / Sea-Serpent	الشجاع	الْشُّجَاع	Beta Draconis
Atik	ʿĀtiq ath-Thurayyā	the Shoulder (of Perseus)		عَاتِق الثّريّا	Omicron Persei
Auva	al-ʿAwwāʾ	the Barking (Dog)	العواء	الْعَوَّاء	Delta Virginis, "Minelauva"
Azfar Adib	Aẓfār adh-Dhiʾb	the Wolf's Nails / Fingerprints	أظفار الذئب	أَظْفَارُ ٱلْذِّئْب	Azfar Adib
Azha	Āshiyānah (Persian: آشیانه, romanized: Āshyāneh)	(Ostrich) Nest	اشیانه	أَشیانَة	Eta Eridani

==== Star groups ====
Parent Group	Transliterated Group	Meaning	Group Name	Transliterated Subgroup	Meaning	Subgroup Name	Scientific star name
Adhara	al-ʿAdhārī	the Virgins / Nymphs	الْعَذَارِي	Awwal al-ʿAdhārī	First of the Virgins / Nymphs	أَوَّلُ ٱلْعَذَارِي	Epsilon Canis Majoris
Adhara	al-ʿAdhārī	the Virgins / Nymphs	الْعَذَارِي	Thānī al-ʿAdhārī	Second of the Virgins / Nymphs	ثَانِيُ ٱلْعَذَارِي	Omicron² Canis Majoris

In Arabic astronomy, Draco was divided into three parts:

1. Alawaid, the first part and the main body of Draco, also called الْرُّبَع ar-Rubaʿ.
2. Arrakis
3. Azfar Adib

=== B ===
Common name	Arabic name (transliteration)	Meaning	Arabic name	Scientific star name
Baham	Saʿd al-Bihām	Luck of the Young Beasts	سعد البهام	Theta Pegasi
Baten Kaitos	Baṭn Qayṭus	Belly of Cetus	بطن قيطوس	Zeta Ceti
Beid	Bayḍ	Eggs	بيض	Omicron¹ Eridani
Benetnash	Banāt an-Naʿsh	Daughters of the bier	بنات النعش	Eta Ursae Majoris see also Alkaid
Betelgeuse	Yad al-Jawzāʾ	hand of the Central One	يد الجوزاء	Alpha Orionis
Botein	al-Buṭayn	the Belly (of the ram)	بطين	Delta Arietis

=== C ===
Common name	Arabic name (transliteration)	Meaning	Arabic name	Scientific star name
Caph	al-Kaff al-Khaḍīb	the Palm (reaching from the Pleiades)	الكـــف الخضيب	Beta Cassiopeiae
Celbalrai	Kalb ar-Rāʿī	the Shepherd's Dog	كلب الراعي	Beta Ophiuchi
Chertan	al-Kharāt	the Rib (of Leo)	الخرت	Theta Leonis
Cursa	Kursī al-Jawzāʾ	the Chair or Footstool (of Orion)	الكرسيّ	Beta Eridani

=== D ===
Common name	Arabic name (transliteration)	Meaning	Arabic name	Scientific star name
Dabih	Saʿd adh-Dhābiḥ	the lucky star of the Slaughterer	سّعد الذّابح	Beta Capricorni
Deneb	Dhanab ad-Dajājah	Tail of the hen	ذنب الدجاجة	Alpha Cygni
Deneb Algedi	Dhanab al-Jady	Tail of the goat	ذنب الجدي	Delta Capricorni
Deneb Dulfim	Dhanab ad-Dulfīn	Tail of the Dolphin	ذنب الدّلفين	Epsilon Delphini
Deneb Kaitos	Dhanab Qayṭus (al-Janūbī)	(Southern) Tail of Cetus	ذنب قيطوس الجنوبي	Beta Ceti see also Diphda
Denebola	Dhanab al-Asad	Tail of the lion	ذنب الاسد	Beta Leonis
Diphda	aḍ-Ḍifdaʿ ath-Thānī	the (second) Frog	الضّفدع الثاني	Beta Ceti
Dschubba	al-Jabhah	the Forehead (of the scorpion)	الجبهة	Delta Scorpii
Dubhe	Kāhil ad-Dubb	(the back of) the Bear	كاهل الدّب	Alpha Ursae Majoris
Dziban	adh-Dhiʾbān	the Two Wolves or Jackals	الذئبان	Psi Draconis

=== E ===
Common name	Arabic name (transliteration)	Meaning	Arabic name	Scientific star name
Edasich	adh-Dhīkh	the Hyena	الذّيخ	Iota Draconis
Elnath	an-Naṭḥ	the butting (of the bull's horns)	النطح	Beta Tauri
Eltanin	at-Tinnīn	the Great Serpent	التنين	Gamma Draconis
Enif	al-Anf	the Nose (of Pegasus)	الأنف	Epsilon Pegasi
Errai	ar-Rāʿī	the Shepherd	الراعي	Gamma Cephei

=== F ===
Common name	Arabic name (transliteration)	Meaning	Arabic name	Scientific star name
Fomalhaut	Fam al-Ḥūt	Mouth of the Whale	فم الحوت	Alpha Piscis Austrini
Fumalsamakah	Fam as-Samakah	Mouth of the fish	فم السمكة	Beta Piscium
Furud	al-Furūd	the bright Single ones (see Zeta Canis Majoris § Name)	الفرد	Zeta Canis Majoris

=== G ===
Common name	Arabic name (transliteration)	Meaning	Arabic name	Scientific star name
Gienah	al-Janāḥ	the Wing	الجناح	Gamma Corvi
Gomeisa	al-Ghumayṣāʾ	the Bleary-eyed one	الغميصاء	Beta Canis Minoris

=== H ===
Common name	Arabic name (transliteration)	Meaning	Arabic name	Scientific star name
Hadar	Ḥaḍār	Settlement	حضار	Beta Centauri
Hamal	Raʾs al-Ḥamal	(head of) the Ram	رأس الحمل	Alpha Arietis
Heka	al-Haqʿah	the White Spot	الهقعة	Lambda Orionis see also Meissa
Homam	Saʿd al-Humām	the Lucky star of the High-minded	سعد الهمام	Zeta Pegasi

=== I ===
Common name	Arabic name (transliteration)	Meaning	Arabic name	Scientific star name
Iklil	Iklīl al-Jabhah	The Crown of the Forehead	إكليل الجبهة	Rho Scorpii
Izar	al-Izār	The girdle, or, The loin-cloth	الإزار	Epsilon Boötis

=== J ===
Common name	Arabic name (transliteration)	Meaning	Arabic name	Scientific star name
Jabbah	al-Jabhah	the Forehead (of the scorpion)	الجبهة	Nu Scorpii

=== K ===
Common name	Arabic name (transliteration)	Meaning	Arabic name	Scientific star name
Kalb	Kaʿb Dhī al-ʿInān	the Shoulder of the Rein-holder	كعب ذي العنان	Iota Aurigae also named Hassaleh
Kaffaljidhma	al-Kaff al-Jadhmāʾ	the Cut-short Hand	الكف الجذماء	Gamma Ceti
Kaffalmusalsala	Kaff al-Musalsalah	The Hand of the Chained Woman	كفّ المسلسة	Kappa Andromedae
Kaus Australis, Kaus Media, Kaus Borealis	al-Qaws	the Bow	القوس	Epsilon Sagittarii Delta Sagittarii Lambda Sagittarii
Keid	al-Qayḍ	the (broken egg) Shells	القيض	Omicron² Eridani
Kitalpha	Qiṭʿat al-Faras	Part of the Horse	قطعة الفرس	Alpha Equulei
Kochab	al-Kawkab	the Star	كوكب	Beta Ursae Minoris
Kurhah	al-Qurḥah	the Blaze on a horse's brow	القرحة	Xi Cephei

=== L ===
Common name	Arabic name (transliteration)	Meaning	Arabic name	Scientific star name
Lesath	al-Lasʿah	The sting	اللسعة	Upsilon Scorpii
Luh-Denebola / Denebola	Dhanab al-Asad / Dhanab al-Layth	the lion's tail	ذنب الاسد/الليث	Beta Leonis

=== M ===
Arab-Latinized star name	Arabic name (transliteration)	Meaning	Arabic name	Arabic name (vowels)	Scientific star name
Maasym	Miʿṣam ath-Thurayyā	the Wrist (of Hercules)	معصم الثّريّا		Lambda Herculis
Maaz	al-Maʿz	the he-Goat	المعز		Epsilon Aurigae
Mankib	Mankib (al-Faras)	the Shoulder (of the Horse)	منكب الفرس		Alpha Pegasi
Marfik	al-Mirfaq	the Elbow	المرفق		Lambda Ophiuchi
Markab	Markab (al-Faras)	the Saddle (of the Horse)	مركب الفرس		Alpha Pegasi
Markeb	Markab	Something to Ride	مركب		Kappa Velorum
Matar	Saʿd Maṭar	the lucky star of Rain	سعد مطر		Eta Pegasi
Mebsuta	adh-Dhirāʿ al-Mabsūṭah	the Outstretched (Paw)	الذّراع المبسوطه		Epsilon Geminorum
Megrez	al-Maghriz	the Base of the bear's tail	مغرز		Delta Ursae Majoris
Meissa	al-Maysān	the Shining one	الميسان		Lambda Orionis
Mekbuda	adh-Dhirāʿ al-Maqbūḍah	the Folded (Arm)	الذّراع المقبوضة		Zeta Geminorum
Meleph	al-Maʿlaf	the Stall			Epsilon Cancri
Menkalinan	Mankib Dhī al-ʿInān	Shoulder of the Rein-holder	منكب ذي العنان		Beta Aurigae
Menkar	al-Minkhar	the Nostril	المنخر		Alpha Ceti
Menkent	Mankib Qanṭūris	the Shoulder of the Centaur	منكب قنطورس		Theta Centauri
Menkib	Mankib ath-Thurayyā	the Shoulder (of the Pleiades)	منكب الثّريّا		Xi Persei
Merak	al-Marāqq	the Loins (of the bear)	المراقّ	الْمِرَاقّ	Beta Ursae Majoris
Mintaka	al-Minṭaqah	the Belt (of Orion)	المنطقة		Delta Orionis
Mirach	al-Marāqq	the Loins / Loincloth	المراقّ	الْمِرَاقّ	Beta Andromedae
Mirak	al-Marāqq	the Loins / Loincloth	المراقّ	الْمِرَاقّ	Epsilon Boötis
Mirfak	Mirfaq ath-Thurayyā	the Elbow	مرفق الثّريّا		Alpha Persei
Mizar	al-Miʾzar	the Apron	المئزر		Zeta Ursae Majoris
Mothallah	Raʾs al-Muthallath	(Head of) the Triangle	الرعس المثلث		Alpha Trianguli
Muhlifain	al-Muḥlifayn		محلفين	مُحْلِفَيْن	Gamma Centauri
Muliphein	al-Muḥlifayn		محلفين	مُحْلِفَيْن	Gamma Canis Majoris
Muphrid	Mufrid ar-Rāmiḥ	the Solitary one of the Lancer	المفرد الرامح		Eta Boötis
Murzim / Mirzam	al-Murzim / al-Mirzam	the Herald	المرزم	الْمُرْزِم \الْمِرْزَم	Beta Canis Majoris

=== N ===
Common name	Arabic name (transliteration)	Meaning	Arabic name	Scientific star name
Nashira	Saʿd Nāshirah	Lucky star of Nashirah	سعد ناشرة	Gamma Capricorni
Nekkar	al-Baqqār	the Cattleman	البقار	Beta Boötis
Nihal	an-Nihāl	(camels) Quenching their thirst	النهال	Beta Leporis
Nusakan	an-Nasaqān	The two arrays	النسقان	Beta Coronae Borealis
Nushaba / Alnasl	Zujj an-Nashshābah / an-Naṣl	the Arrowhead	زُجِّ النشابة / النصل	Gamma Sagittarii

=== O ===
Common name	Arabic name (transliteration)	Meaning	Arabic name	Scientific star name
Okda	al-ʿUqdah	the Knot	العقدة	Alpha Piscium

=== P ===
Common name	Arabic name (transliteration)	Meaning	Arabic name	Scientific star name
Phact	(al-)Fākhitah	the Dove	فاخثة	Alpha Columbae
Phad	(al-)Fakhidh	the Thigh	فخذ	Gamma Ursae Majoris
Pherkad	(al-)Farqad	the Calf	فرقد	Gamma Ursae Minoris

=== R ===
Common name	Arabic name (transliteration)	Meaning	Arabic name	Scientific star name
Rasalased	Raʾs al-Asad	Head of the lion	رأس الأسد	Epsilon Leonis
Rasalgethi	Raʾs al-Jāthī	Head of the Kneeler	رأس الجاثي	Alpha Herculis
Rasalhague	Raʾs al-Ḥawwāʾ	Head of the Snake-man	رأس الحوّاء	Alpha Ophiuchi
Rasalnaqa	Raʾs an-Nāqah	Head of the She-camel	رأس العقنقة	Iota Andromedae
Rastaban	Raʾs ath-Thuʿbān	Head of the Snake	رأس الثعبان	Beta Draconis
Rigel	Rijl al-Jabbār	Foot of the Giant	رجل الجبّار	Beta Orionis see also Algebar
Rigil Kentaurus	Rijl al-Qanṭūris	Foot of the Centaur	رجل القنطورس	Alpha Centauri
Risha	ar-Rishāʾ	the Well-Rope	الرشاء	Alpha Piscium
Rukbah	ar-Rukbah	the Knee	الركبة	Delta Cassiopeiae
Rukbat	Rukbat ar-Rāmī	Knee of the archer	ركبة الرامي	Alpha Sagittarii

=== S ===
Common name	Arabic name (transliteration)	Meaning	Arabic name	Scientific star name
Sabik	as-Sābiq	the Preceding	السابق	Eta Ophiuchi
Sadachbia	Saʿd al-Akhbiyah	Lucky star of the Tents	سعد الاخبية	Gamma Aquarii
Sadalbari	Saʿd al-Bāriʿ	Lucky star of the Splendid one	سعد البارع	Mu Pegasi
Sadalmelik	Saʿd al-Malik	Lucky star of the King	سعد الملك	Alpha Aquarii
Sadalsuud	Saʿd as-Suʿūd	Luck of Lucks	سعد السعود	Beta Aquarii
Sadr	aṣ-Ṣadr	the Breast (of the hen)	الصدر	Gamma Cygni
Saiph	as-Sayf	the Sword (of Orion)	السيف	Kappa Orionis
Scheat	as-Sāʿid	the Shoulder	الساعد	Beta Pegasi
Shaula	ash-Shawlah	the Raised (tail of the scorpion)	الشولة	Lambda Scorpii
Schedar	aṣ-Ṣadr	the Breast	الصدر	Alpha Cassiopeiae
Sheliak	ash-Shiliyāq	Lyra	الشلياق	Beta Lyrae
Sheratan	ash-Sharaṭayn	the Two Signs	الشَّرَطَيْن	Beta Arietis
Sirrah	Surrat al-Faras	Navel (of the Mare)	سُرَّة الفرس	Alpha Andromedae
Siwarha	Siwāruhā	her bracelet	سِوَارهَا	Alpha Orionis B
Skat	as-Sāq (or Shiʾt)	the Leg (or the Wish)	الساق / شئت	Delta Aquarii
Spica	as-Sunbulah	the Stem	السنبلة	Alpha Virginis
Sulafat	as-Sulaḥfāh	the Tortoise	السلحفاة	Gamma Lyrae

=== T ===
Arab-Latinized name	Arabic name (transliteration)	Meaning	Arabic name	Arabic name (vowels)	Scientific star name
Talitha Australis, Talitha Borealis	al-Qafzah ath-Thālithah	the Third Leap (of the ghazal)	القفزة الثّالثة	القفزة الثّالثة	Kappa Ursae Majoris
Tania Australis, Tania Borealis	al-Qafzah ath-Thāniyah	the Second Leap (of the gazelle)	القفزة الثّانية	القفزة الثّانية	Mu Ursae Majoris
Tarf	aṭ-Ṭarf	"The glance" of the lion	الطرف	الطَّرَف	Beta Cancri
Thuban	ath-Thuʿbān	the Snake	الثعبان	الْثُّعْبَان	Alpha Draconis
Toliman	aẓ-Ẓalīmān	the (two male) ostriches	الظَّلِيمَان	الظَّلِيمَان	Alpha Centauri B

=== U ===
Common name	Arabic name (transliteration)	Meaning	Arabic name	Scientific star name
Unukalhai	ʿUnuq al-Ḥayyah	Neck of the Snake	عنق الحية	Alpha Serpentis

=== V ===
Common name	Arabic name (transliteration)	Meaning	Arabic name	Scientific star name
Vega	an-Nisr al-Wāqiʿ	the Falling Eagle	النسر الواقع	Alpha Lyrae

=== W ===
Common name	Arabic name (transliteration)	Meaning	Arabic name	Scientific star name
Wasat	Wasaṭ as-Samāʾ	"Middle" of the sky	وسط السماء	Delta Geminorum
Wezen	al-Wazn	the Weight	الوزن	Delta Canis Majoris
Wezn	al-Wazn	the Weight	الوزن	Beta Columbae

=== Y ===
Common name	Arabic name (transliteration)	Meaning	Arabic name	Scientific star name
Yed Posterior	Muʾakhkhar Yad al-Ḥawwāʾ	(Back of the Snake Man's) Hand	مؤخّر يد الحوّاء	Epsilon Ophiuchi
Yed Prior	Muqaddam Yad al-Ḥawwāʾ	(Palm of the Snake Man's) Hand	مقدّم يد الحوّاء	Delta Ophiuchi

=== Z ===
Common name	Arabic name (transliteration)	Meaning	Arabic name	Scientific star name
Zaurac	az-Zawraq	the Boat	الزورق	Gamma Eridani
Zavijava	Zāwiyat al-ʿAwwāʾ	the Angle of the Barking Dog	زاوية العواء	Beta Virginis
Zawiah aka Zaniah	az-Zāwiyah	The angle	الزاوية	Eta Virginis
Zubenelgenubi	az-Zubān al-Janūbī	Southern Claw (of the scorpion)	الزبان الجنوبي	Alpha Librae
Zubenelhakrabi	Zubān al-ʿAqrab	Claws (of the scorpion)	زبان العقرب	Gamma Librae
Zubeneschamali	az-Zubān ash-Shamālī	Northern Claw (of the scorpion)	الزبان الشمالي	Beta Librae

=== Others ===
Common name	Arabic name (transliteration)	Meaning	Arabic name
Milky Way	Darb at-Tabbānah	The Milky Road	درب التبانة
Andromeda Galaxy	as-Saḥābah aṣ-Ṣaghīrah ("small cloud")	"little cloud" was the Arabic name for the Andromeda Galaxy, which was first mentioned by Al-Sufi in his Book of Fixed Stars	السَحَابَة الصَغِيرَة

== See also ==
- Astronomy in the medieval Islamic world
- List of proper names of stars
- List of Chinese star names
- Lists of astronomical objects
