= Caput Draconis =

The phrase caput draconis means "dragon's head" (or "head of the dragon") in Latin.

Caput Draconis may also refer to:

- The "head" of the constellation Draco, consisting of the stars Eltanin, Rastaban, Kuma, and Grumium
- The ascending lunar node
- Caput Draconis (geomancy), a geomantic figure in divination
- Dracocephalum, a genus of plants
- A password used to enter the Gryffindor common room in Harry Potter and the Philosopher's Stone, used first by Percy Weasley
- An Island in The Legend of Zelda: Tears of the Kingdom

== See also ==
- Dragon's Head (disambiguation)
