= Etamin (disambiguation) =

Etamin may refer to:

- Gamma Draconis, a star in the constellation Draco.
- USS Etamin (AK-93) a United States navy ship.
