= USS Grumium =

Cargo ship of the United States Navy

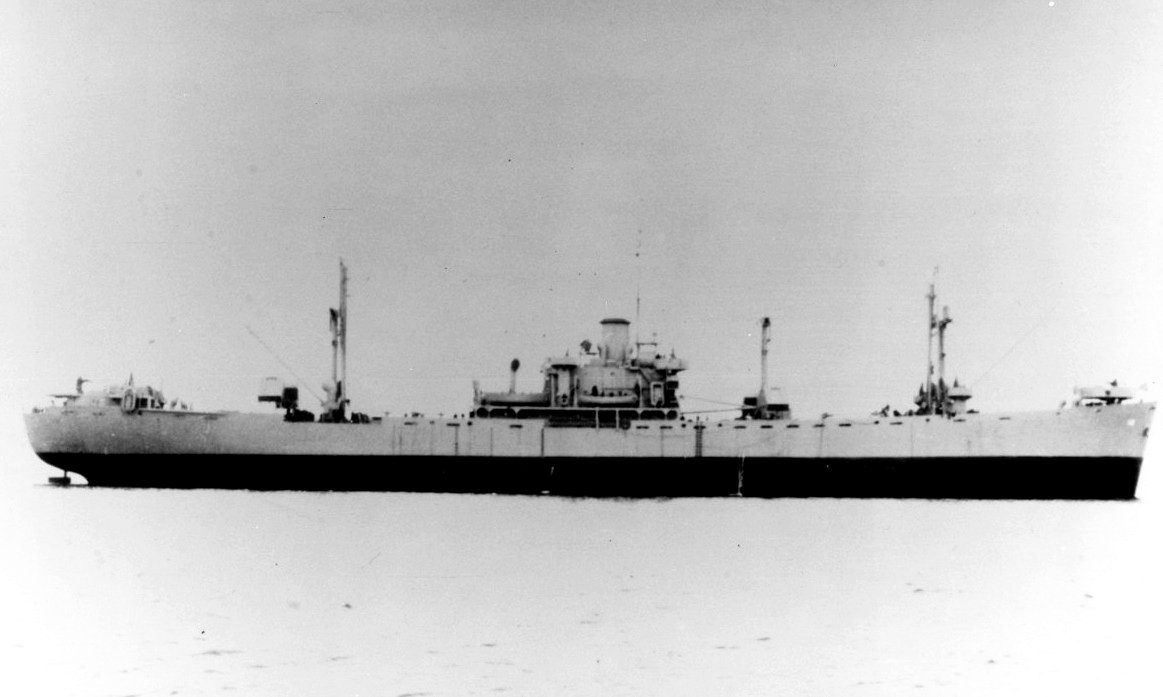
- Starboard side view of USS Grumium (AK-112), probably c. late October 1943, in San Francisco Bay.

History

United States
- Name: William G. McAdoo
- Namesake: William G. McAdoo
- Owner: War Shipping Administration (WSA)
- Operator: American President Lines (APL)
- Ordered: as a Type EC2-S-C1 hull, MCE hull 443
- Builder: Permanente Metals Corporation, Yard #2, Richmond, California
- Cost: $1,120,662
- Yard number: 443
- Way number: 1
- Laid down: 11 November 1942
- Launched: 20 December 1942
- Sponsored by: Mrs. T.Y. Stuyvesant
- In service: 30 December 1942
- Fate: transferred to the US Navy, 5 October 1943

United States
- Name: Grumium
- Namesake: The star Grumium
- Acquired: 5 October 1943
- Commissioned: 20 October 1943
- Decommissioned: 20 December 1945
- Reclassified: Miscellaneous Unclassified (IX), 20 June 1944; Aviation Supply Issue Ship (AVS), 25 May 1945
- Refit: Grumium-class Aviation Supply Issue Ship, at Alameda, California, March 1945
- Stricken: 8 January 1946
- Identification: Hull symbol: AK-112; Hull symbol: IX-174; Hull symbol: AVS-3; Code letters: NTVK
- Honors and awards: 1 × battle stars
- Fate: Sold for scrapping, 17 April 1970; scrapped 27 October 1970

General characteristics
- Class & type: Crater-class cargo ship (1943–1945); Grumium-class aviation supply issue ship (1945–1946)
- Tonnage: 10,856 DWT; 7,176 GT
- Displacement: 4,023 long tons (4,088 t) (standard); 14,550 long tons (14,780 t) (full load)
- Length: 441 ft 6 in (134.57 m)
- Beam: 56 ft 11 in (17.35 m)
- Draft: 28 ft 4 in (8.64 m)
- Installed power: 2 × Babcock & Wilcox header-type boilers, 220psi 450°; 2,500 shp (1,900 kW)
- Propulsion: 1 × General Machine Corp. vertical triple-expansion reciprocating steam engine; 1 × shaft
- Speed: 12.5 kn (23.2 km/h; 14.4 mph)
- Capacity: 7,800 t (7,700 long tons) DWT; 444,206 cu ft (12,578.5 m^{3}) (non-refrigerated)
- Complement: 206
- Armament: 1 × 5 in (127 mm)/38-caliber dual-purpose gun; 1 × 3 in (76 mm)/50-caliber dual-purpose gun; 6 × 20 mm (0.79 in) Oerlikon cannons anti-aircraft (AA) mounts

USS Grumium (AK-112/IX-174/AVS-3) was a Crater-class cargo ship and aviation supply ship in the service of the US Navy in World War II. Named after the star Grumium in the constellation Draco, it was the only ship of the Navy to bear this name.

== Construction ==
Grumium was laid down under a Maritime Commission (MARCOM) contract, MCE hull 443, on 12 November 1942, as the liberty ship William G. McAdoo, by the Permanente Metals Corporation, Yard #2, in Richmond, California. She was launched on 20 December 1942, sponsored by Mrs. T. Y. Sturtevant.

William G. McAdoo was delivered to the American President Lines, on 30 December 1942.

== Service history ==
William G. McAdoo was acquired by the Navy on 5 October 1943. The ship was converted for Navy use by the Todd Shipyards, in Seattle, Washington, and commissioned on 20 October 1943, as a Crater-class cargo ship, AK-112.

Grumium loaded supplies at San Francisco, on 9 November, and got underway from San Pedro, on 19 November 1943, bound for Pago Pago. The ship unloaded drum gas there and at Funafuti, from 8 to 11 December, after which she proceeded to Kwajalein, on 6 March, and Eniwetok, on 15 March, delivering oil and aviation fuel. After another stop at Kwajalein, from 26 to 28 April, Grumium returned to San Francisco, via Pearl Harbor, arriving in California, on 27 May 1944.

=== Conversion to "aviation supply issue ship" ===
At San Francisco, Grumium was transferred to the direct control of Commander, Naval Air Forces, Pacific Fleet, (ComAirPac) Vice Admiral John Henry Towers, and underwent conversion to an aviation support ship. She was converted to a Grumium-class Aviation Supply Issue Ship, at Alameda, California, and redesignated Miscellaneous Unclassified, (IX-174), 20 June 1944, and 2 days later was underway for Pearl Harbor once more, to supply American fast carrier aircraft, then increasing greatly in numbers.

== Late war service ==
Grumium arrived Pearl Harbor 30 June, and 10 July, continued to Roi Island. Arriving 19 July, the ship transferred supplies to aircraft groups until early September, then returned to Pearl Harbor. She sailed with another load of aviation supplies, on 28 September, calling at Ulithi and Eniwetok, before arriving at Manus, on 17 November. There she supplied carrier forces making the supporting strikes for the Philippine campaign, as America's great island offensive gained momentum. Remaining at Manus, until 5 December 1944, Grumium sailed to a closer advance base, Ulithi, arriving four days later. From Ulithi, the ship supported the far reaching air raids on the Philippines, Okinawa, and Formosa, in the months to come.

As US forces moved ever north and west, supplies had to be moved into new advance bases, and Grumium sailed 14 January 1945, to bring up aviation supplies from Manus to Ulithi. Then she made a similar voyage to Roi Island, before moving her supply base to Guam, on 16 March 1945. The ship was soon to carry her support activities to the assault area itself and rendezvoused with an Okinawa-bound convey at Saipan, on 23 March.

=== Supporting Okinawa invasion operations ===
As American forces went ashore at Okinawa, on Easter Sunday, 1 April 1945, and began that campaign, Grumium made preparations to supply the cruising carrier groups from Kerama Retto, near Okinawa. Arriving on 2 April, she serviced the escort carrier groups protecting the landing and providing group support. Japanese forces were determined to defeat the assault and quickly expanded suicide attacks against the assembled ships. Grumium came under air attack at Kerama Retto, on 6 and 7 April; of the many planes destroyed she helped shoot down one. She also rescued survivors from a suicide crash on Pinkney, on 28 April, and a bomb hit on Terror, on 30 April.

While Grumium was at Kerama Retto, a special designation for aviation supply ships was established; and she became AVS-3 on 25 May 1945. She departed the Okinawa area 6 June, arriving at Guam, on 14 June, and Eniwetok, to supply the carrier forces, on 1 July. Grumium remained there during and after the final operations of the war, providing vital supplies, until departing for the Hawaiian Islands, on 12 October. She stopped briefly at Pearl Harbor, and arrived in Norfolk, via the Panama Canal, 25 November, for deactivation. She was decommissioned, 20 December 1945, and redelivered to the Maritime Commission, 27 December 1945.

== Fate ==
The ship was subsequently laid up in the James River Reserve Fleet, Lee Hall, Virginia. Grumium, along with the Liberty ship SS George Pomutz, was sold for $203,600, on 17 April 1970, to N. V. Intershita. She was delivered 18 May 1970, and subsequently sold to Salvamento y Demolicion Naval S. A., Barcelona, Spain, for scrapping, completed, 27 October 1970.

== Awards ==
Grumium received one battle stars for World War II service.

== Bibliography ==
- "Grumium". Dictionary of American Naval Fighting Ships. Naval History and Heritage Command. This article incorporates text from this source, which is in the public domain.
- "Kaiser Permanente No. 2, Richmond CA". www.ShipbuildingHistory.com. 13 October 2010.
- Priolo, Gary P. (26 August 2016). "USS Grumium (AVS-3)". NavSource.
- "WILLIAM G. McADOO". United States Department of Transportation. Archived from the original on 12 December 2019.
- "SS William G. McAdoo".
