= Omicron Eridani =

ο Eridani (Latinised as Omicron Eridani) refers to 2 distinct star systems in the constellation Eridanus:

- Omicron^{1} Eridani (ο^{1} Eridani), or 38 Eridani, with traditional name "Beid"
- Omicron^{2} Eridani (ο^{2} Eridani), better known as 40 Eridani, with traditional name "Keid"
