= List of star names in Draco =

This is the list of the star names in the constellation Draco.

== List ==
star	proper name	etymon
α Dra	Thuban	Arabic
β Dra	Rastaban	Arabic
γ Dra	Eltanin	Arabic
δ Dra	Altais	Arabic
ζ Dra	Aldhibah	Arabic
η Dra	Athebyne	Arabic
ι Dra	Edasich	Arabic
λ Dra	Giausar	Persian
μ Dra	Alrakis	Arabic
ν Dra	Alawaidh	Arabic
ξ Dra	Grumium	Latin
σ Dra	Alsafi	Arabic
ψ^{1} Dra	Dziban	Arabic

== α Dra ==
- Thuban:

＜ (ar) ثعبان thu'bān, serpent, the last part of Ra's al-Thu'bān. (See β Dra.)

- Adib:

＜ (ar) الذئبة al-Dhi'b, the Wolf. (See θ Dra.)

- the Dragon's Tail:

called among seamen.

- Zǐ Wēi Yòu Yuán:

＜ (Zǐ Wēi Yòu Yuán yī) Right Wall of Purple Forbidden Enclosure.

== β Dra ==
- Rastaban:

＜ (ar) س الثعبان Ra's al-Thu'bān the Head of the Serpent, transferred from γ Dra. (See γ Dra.)

- Alwaid:

＜ (ar) al-‘Awā'idh the Old Mother( Camel)s, for β, γ, ξ, and ν Dra.
＜ (ar) al-‘Awwād the Lute-player. (See μ Dra.)

- Asuia:

＜ (ar) al-Shujā‘ the Sea-serpent.

== γ Dra ==
- Eltanin (Etamin, Etanin):

＜ (ar) راس التنين Ra's al-Tinnīn the Head of the Dragon.

- Rastaben (Rasaben, Rastaban):

＜ mistransliterated form of Ra's al-Tinnīn.

- the Zenith-star:

== See also ==
- List of stars in Draco
- List of star names
