= Dragon's Head =

Dragon's Head may refer to,

- Dragon's head, plants of the genus Dracocephalum
- Dragon's head (Caput Draconis, or Anabibazon), the north lunar node used in astrology
- Dragon's Head Nebula, an emissions nebula which is also known as NGC 2035.

== See also ==
- Dragon Head, a manga and a 2003 film
- Dragonheads, an EP by the Finnish band Ensiferum
- Caput Draconis (disambiguation), Latin for "dragon's head"
