= Xi Cancri =

Binary star system in the constellation Cancer

ξ Cancri
- Location of Nahn (circled)

Observation data Epoch J2000.0 Equinox J2000.0 (ICRS)
- Constellation: Cancer
- Right ascension: 09^{h} 09^{m} 21.541^{s}
- Declination: +22° 02′ 43.58″
- Apparent magnitude (V): +5.15 (5.70 + 6.20)

Characteristics
- Evolutionary stage: red giant branch
- Spectral type: G9 III Fe-1 CH-0.5
- U−B color index: +0.75
- B−V color index: +0.96

Astrometry
Radial velocity (R_{v})	+7.7±0.3 km/s
Proper motion (μ)	RA: −3.147 mas/yr Dec.: 9.159 mas/yr
Parallax (π)	8.004±0.3286 mas
Distance	410 ± 20 ly (125 ± 5 pc)
Absolute magnitude (M_{V})	−0.12

Orbit
Period (P)	1,700.76 ± 2.7 d (4.6564 ± 0.0074 yr)
Semi-major axis (a)	0.0105±0.0017" (≥ 103.0×10^{6} km (0.689 AU))
Eccentricity (e)	0.06±0.05
Periastron epoch (T)	2428876.86±10.0 JD
Argument of periastron (ω) (secondary)	301.1±38.3°
Semi-amplitude (K_{1}) (primary)	4.41±0.02 km/s

Details
Mass	3.40+0.11 −0.21 M_{☉}
Radius	16.13+0.73 −0.66 R_{☉}
Luminosity	149+12 −11 L_{☉}
Surface gravity (log g)	2.62±0.07 cgs
Temperature	5,025+9 −11 K
Rotational velocity (v sin i)	2.1±1.0 km/s
Age	271+54 −63 Myr

Other designations
- Nahn, ξ Cnc, 77 Cancri, BD+22°2061, FK5 1239, GC 12635, HD 78515, HIP 44946, HR 3627, SAO 80666, WDS J09094+2203AB

Database references
SIMBAD	data

Xi Cancri is a binary star system in the zodiac constellation of Cancer. Its name is a Bayer designation that is Latinised from ξ Cancri, and abbreviated Xi Cnc or ξ Cnc. This system is faintly visible to the naked eye with a combined apparent visual magnitude of +5.15. Based upon parallax measurements, it is approximately 410 light-years distant from the Sun. At its present distance, the visual magnitude is diminished by an extinction factor of 0.135 due to interstellar dust. It is drifting further away with a line of sight velocity of +8 km/s.

The two components are designated Xi Cancri A (formally named Nahn, pronounced /ˈnɑːn/) and B. The primary component is an evolved giant star. The position of this system near the ecliptic means it is subject to lunar occultation.

== Nomenclature ==
ξ Cancri (Latinised to Xi Cancri) is the system's Bayer designation. The designations of the two components as Xi Cancri A and B derive from the convention used by the Washington Multiplicity Catalog (WMC) for multiple star systems, and adopted by the International Astronomical Union (IAU).

Xi Cancri together with Lambda Leonis (Alterf) were the Persian Nahn, "the Nose", and the Coptic Piautos, "the Eye", both lunar asterisms. Nahn was also the name given to Xi Cancri in a 1971 NASA technical memorandum. In 2016, the IAU organized a Working Group on Star Names (WGSN) to catalog and standardize proper names for stars. The WGSN decided to attribute proper names to individual stars rather than entire multiple systems. It approved the name Nahn for the component Xi Cancri A on 1 June 2018 and it is now so included in the List of IAU-approved Star Names.

== Properties ==
The variable radial velocity of this system was discovered by W. W. Campbell in 1922. Xi Cancri is a single-lined spectroscopic binary star system with an orbital period of 4.66 years, an eccentricity of 0.06, and a semimajor axis of 0.01 arcsecond.

The primary, Xi Cancri A, is a yellow G-type giant with a stellar classification of G9 III Fe-1 CH-0.5 and an apparent magnitude of +5.70. The suffix notation indicates the spectrum displays underabundances of iron and cyanide compared to similar stars. An evolved star that has exhausted the supply of hydrogen at its core, it is 271 million years old with 3.4 times the mass of the Sun and has expanded to 16 times the Sun's radius. The star is radiating 149 times the luminosity of the Sun from its enlarged photosphere at an effective temperature of 5,025 K. Its companion, Xi Cancri B, is of magnitude 6.20.
