= USS Etamin =

Cargo ship of the United States Navy

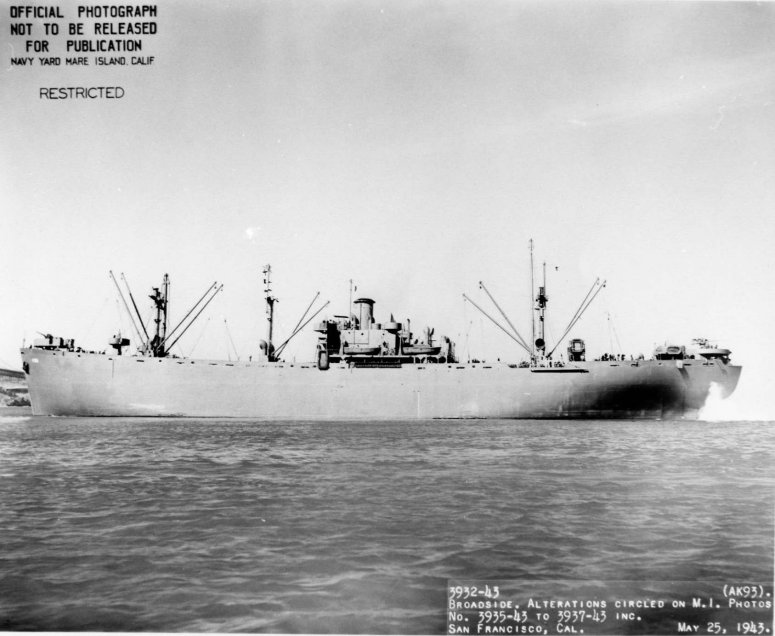
- USS Etamin (AK-93), broadside view, underway off San Francisco, 25 May 1943.

History

United States
- Name: Isaac Babbitt; Etamin
- Namesake: Isaac Babbitt; The star Etamin
- Ordered: as a Type EC2-S-C1 hull, MCE hull 1106
- Builder: Permanente Metals Corporation, Richmond, California
- Cost: $959,509
- Yard number: 1106
- Way number: 1
- Laid down: 28 March 1943
- Launched: 25 April 1943
- Acquired: 8 May 1943
- Commissioned: 25 May 1943
- Decommissioned: 26 June 1944
- In service: 12 August 1944
- Out of service: 9 July 1946
- Reclassified: non-self propelled storage hulk, 12 August 1944
- Stricken: 31 July 1946
- Identification: Hull symbol: AK-93; Hull symbol: IX-173; Code letters: NJTE; US Official Number: 243378
- Honors and awards: 2 × battle stars
- Fate: Sold, 2 February 1948

General characteristics
- Class & type: Crater-class cargo ship
- Tonnage: 7,176 gross register tons (GRT); 10,500 long tons deadweight (DWT)
- Displacement: 4,023 long tons (4,088 t) (standard); 14,550 long tons (14,780 t) (full load)
- Length: 441 ft 6 in (134.57 m)
- Beam: 56 ft 11 in (17.35 m)
- Draft: 28 ft 4 in (8.64 m)
- Depth: 37 ft 4 in (11.38 m); 34 ft 8 in (10.57 m)
- Installed power: 2 × Oil fired 450 °F (232 °C) boilers, operating at 220 psi (1,500 kPa) , (manufactured by Babcock & Wilcox); 2,500 shp (1,900 kW)
- Propulsion: 1 × Vertical triple-expansion reciprocating steam engine, (manufactured by Joshua Hendy); 1 × screw propeller
- Speed: 12.5 kn (23.2 km/h; 14.4 mph)
- Capacity: 7,800 t (7,700 long tons) DWT; 444,206 cu ft (12,578.5 m^{3}) (non-refrigerated)
- Complement: 198
- Armament: 1 × 5 in (127 mm)/38 caliber dual-purpose (DP) gun; 1 × 3 in (76 mm)/50 caliber DP gun; 2 × 40 mm (1.57 in) Bofors anti-aircraft (AA) gun mounts; 6 × 20 mm (0.79 in) Oerlikon cannon AA gun mounts

USS Etamin (AK-93) was the Liberty ship (EC2) Isaac Babbitt constructed for the US Maritime Commission (MARCOM) in 1943, for World War II service at a cost of $959,509. After acquisition by the US Navy, the ship was named Etamin, after the brightest star in the constellation Draco and manned by a US Coast Guard crew. As a Crater-class cargo ship, she served the military in the Pacific Ocean by providing food and material until she was torpedoed and put out of service. After repairs, she served as a non-self-propelled floating warehouse for the rest of the war. The ship ended the war in the Philippines and was among fifteen hulls sold for scrap for a lump sum of $271,000.

== Construction ==
Etamin was launched 25 April 1943, as Isaac Babbitt, MCE hull 1106, by Permanente Metals Corporation, Yard No. 2, Richmond, California, under a Maritime Commission (MARCOM) contract; acquired by the Navy 8 May 1943; and commissioned 25 May 1943.

== Service history ==
She was assigned to the Naval Overseas Transportation Service (NOTS), 12th Naval District with operational control given to Commander, 7th Fleet Service Force.

The ship was one of five Navy manned Liberties assigned 8 December 1943 to the Southwest Pacific Area for service to meet Army requirements. She was active in the southwest Pacific Ocean issuing stores to the fleet and making minor repairs.

On 27 April 1944, Etamin was disabled by a torpedo hit in Milne Bay and towed to Cairns, Australia, where she decommissioned on 26 June 1944. The ship, no longer self-propelled because of the torpedo damage, was designated as an unclassified miscellaneous auxiliary (IX) and placed in service as Etamin (IX-173) on 12 August 1944 continuing to issue stores to the fleet while under tow. She was placed out of service on 9 July 1946 and stricken from the Navy List on 31 July.

At the time of the 1944 torpedo attack, one of Etamin's crewmembers was future Pro Football Hall of Fame inductee Emlen Tunnell. Tunnell rescued a fellow crewmember and was later awarded the Silver Lifesaving Medal for heroism.

== Sale and scrapping ==
Returned to the MARCOM for disposal, the ship was laid up at Subic Bay, Philippines, 9 July 1946. She was one of fifteen vessels sold for scrap to Asia Development Corporation, Shanghai, for a total of $271,000. She was sold 29 January 1948, and delivered 3 March 1948.

== Awards ==
Etamin received two battle stars for World War II service.

== Bibliography ==
- "Etamin". Dictionary of American Naval Fighting Ships. Naval History and Heritage Command. This article incorporates text from this source, which is in the public domain.
- "Kaiser Permanente No. 2, Richmond CA". www.ShipbuildingHistory.com. 13 October 2010.
- "USS Etamin (AK-93)". NavSource. 13 June 2014.
- "ETAMIN". United States Department of Transportation. Archived from the original on December 12, 2019.
- "ISAAC BABBITT". United States Department of Transportation.
- Lloyds. "Lloyd's Register 1945–46" (PDF). Lloyd's Register (through PlimsollShipData).
- Masterson, Dr. James R. (1949). U. S. Army Transportation In The Southwest Pacific Area 1941–1947. Washington, D. C.: Transportation Unit, Historical Division, Special Staff, U. S. Army. pp. 359, 390.
- "SS ISAAC BABBITT".
