= Alruba =

Star in the constellation Draco

- Location of Alruba (circled)

Observation data Epoch J2000.0 Equinox ICRS
- Constellation: Draco
- Pronunciation: /ælˈruːbə/
- Right ascension: 17^{h} 43^{m} 59.17049^{s}
- Declination: +54° 48′ 06.1637″
- Apparent magnitude (V): 5.76

Characteristics
- Evolutionary stage: Main sequence
- Spectral type: A0V

Astrometry
Radial velocity (R_{v})	−2.0 km/s
Proper motion (μ)	RA: 17.450 mas/yr Dec.: −18.125 mas/yr
Parallax (π)	7.1436±0.0605 mas
Distance	457 ± 4 ly (140 ± 1 pc)
Absolute magnitude (M_{V})	−0.3

Details
Mass	2.97±0.07 M_{☉}
Luminosity	146.7+29.6 −24.7 L_{☉}
Surface gravity (log g)	3.80±0.10 cgs
Temperature	9,226+107 −106 K
Metallicity [Fe/H]	−0.40±0.11 dex
Rotational velocity (v sin i)	170 km/s
Age	58 Myr

Other designations
- Alruba, BD+53°1978, CPD–51°9815, HD 161693, HIP 86782, HR 6618, SAO 30538

Database references
SIMBAD	data

Alruba, a name derived from Arabic for "the foal", is a suspected astrometric binary star system in the northern circumpolar constellation of Draco. It is just barely visible to the naked eye as a dim point of light with an apparent visual magnitude of 5.76. Based on parallax measurements obtained during the Gaia mission, it is located at a distance of about 457 light-years (140 parsecs) from the Sun. The system is drifting closer with a radial velocity of −2 km/s.

The visible component is an A-type main-sequence star with a stellar classification of A0 V. It is about 58 million years old with three times the mass of the Sun and has a high rate of spin, showing a projected rotational velocity of 170 km/s. The star is radiating 147 times the luminosity of the Sun from its photosphere at an effective temperature of 9,226 K. The system is a source for X-ray emission, which is most likely coming from the unseen companion.

== Nomenclature ==
In the Henry Draper catalogue this system has the designation HD 161693, while it has the identifier HR 6618 in the Bright Star Catalogue.

It bore the traditional Arabic name الربع Al Rubaʽ "the foal" (specifically a young camel born in the spring), a member of the Mother Camels asterism in early Arabic astronomy.

In 2016, the International Astronomical Union organized a Working Group on Star Names (WGSN) to catalogue and standardize proper names for stars. The WGSN approved the name Alruba for this star on 1 June 2018 and it is now so entered on the List of IAU-approved Star Names.
