= Iota Herculis =

Star in the constellation Hercules

ι Herculis
- Location of ι Herculis (circled in red)

Observation data Epoch J2000 Equinox ICRS
- Constellation: Hercules
- Right ascension: 17^{h} 39^{m} 27.8864^{s}
- Declination: +46° 00′ 22.795″
- Apparent magnitude (V): 3.80

Characteristics
- Spectral type: B3IV
- U−B color index: −0.71
- B−V color index: −0.18
- Variable type: Beta Cephei

Astrometry
Radial velocity (R_{v})	−21.23±0.20 km/s
Proper motion (μ)	RA: +7.48 mas/yr Dec.: +4.53 mas/yr
Parallax (π)	7.17±0.13 mas
Distance	455 ± 8 ly (139 ± 3 pc)
Absolute magnitude (M_{V})	−1.97

Orbit
Period (P)	111.5±0.1 days
Semi-major axis (a)	≥12.68±0.74 R_{☉} (A)
Eccentricity (e)	0.53±0.03
Argument of periastron (ω) (secondary)	208.3+5.2 −5.0°
Semi-amplitude (K_{1}) (primary)	6.8+0.4 −0.3 km/s

Details
Mass	5.40+0.12 −0.08 M_{☉}
Radius	4.74±0.34 R_{☉}
Luminosity	2,489 L_{☉}
Surface gravity (log g)	3.61±0.02 cgs
Temperature	14,346+104 −96 K
Metallicity [Fe/H]	−0.40 dex
Rotational velocity (v sin i)	6±1 km/s
Age	37.8±8.6 Myr

Other designations
- Tianbang, ι Her, 85 Her, BD+46°2349, FK5 663, GC 23965, HD 160762, HIP 86414, HR 6588, SAO 46872, CCDM J17395+4601A

Database references
SIMBAD	data

Iota Herculis, also named Tianbang, is a fourth-magnitude binary star in the constellation Hercules, 139 parsecs (450 light-years) away. The brightest is a β Cephei variable, a pulsating star.

== Etymology ==
Iota Herculis (Latinized from ι Herculis, abbreviated ι Her) is the star's Bayer designation.

In Chinese astronomy, 天棓 (Tiān Bàng), meaning Celestial Flail, refers to an asterism consisting of ι Herculis, ξ Draconis, ν Draconis, β Draconis and γ Draconis. Consequently, ι Herculis itself is known as 天棓五 (Tiān Bàng wu, English: the Fifth Star of Celestial Flail). The IAU Working Group on Star Names adopted the name Tianbang for Iota Herculis A on 20 June 2026, after this Chinese constellation.

== Visibility ==
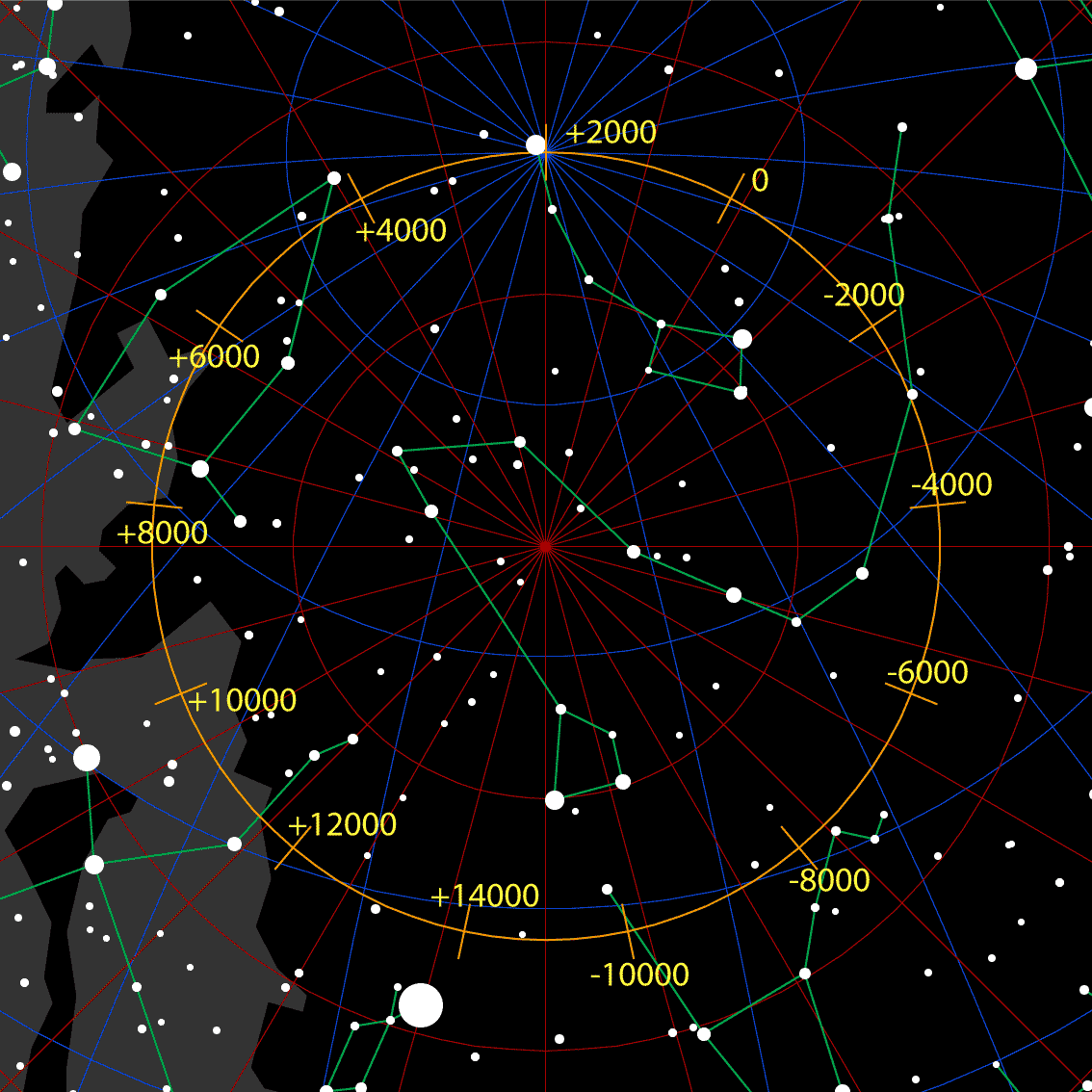
The path of the north celestial pole among the stars due to the precession. Vega is the brightest star near the bottom, Iota Herculis is to the right near the −10,000 hatch mark.

Iota Herculis is dim enough that in cities with a lot of light pollution it is unlikely to be visible with the naked eye. In rural areas it will usually be visible, and for much of the Northern Hemisphere the star is circumpolar and visible year around.

=== Pole star ===
As a visible star, the proximity of Iota Herculis to the precessional path the Earth's North Pole traces across the celestial sphere makes it a pole star, a title currently held by Polaris. In 10,000 BCE it was the pole star, and in the future it will be again. While Polaris is only 0.5° off the precessional path Iota Herculis is 4° off.

Preceded by	Pole star	Succeeded by
Vega	~16,000 CE	Tau Herculis

== Properties ==
Iota Herculis is a single-lined spectroscopic binary having an orbital period of 111.5 days. The primary star's semi-major axis around the barycenter is of at least 0.0590 au. The orbit is somewhat eccentric, at e = 0.53. Nothing is known about the companion.

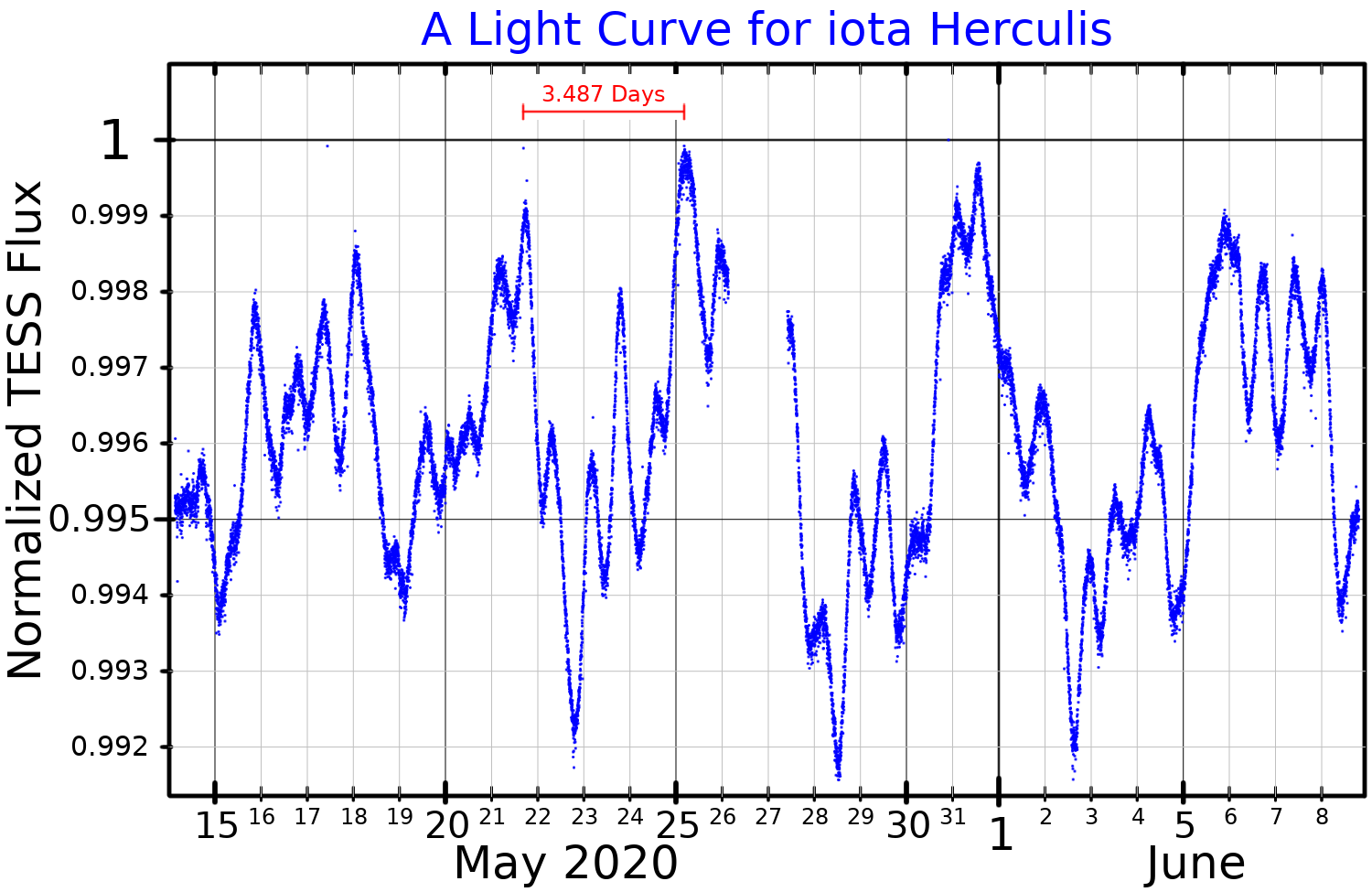
A light curve for Iota Herculis, plotted from TESS data. The 3.487 day period is marked in red.

The primary component is a B-type subgiant star that is at the end of its hydrogen fusion stage. With a stellar classification B3IV, it is considerably larger than the Sun, having a mass that is 5.4 times solar and a radius 4.7 times. Though its apparent magnitude is only 3.80, it is 2,500 times more luminous than the Sun, yielding an absolute magnitude of −2.11, brighter in fact than most of the hot B stars in the Pleiades open star cluster. The Hipparcos satellite mission estimated its distance at roughly 152 parsecs (pc) from Earth, or 496 light-years (ly) away; an updated parallax measurement from Floor van Leeuwen in 2007, however, puts the distance at 455 ly with a much tighter error factor of only 8 ly.

A companion at a separation of about 30 au from Iota Herculis has been reported at the Washington Double Star Catalog, but it has been observed only once and is considered unconfirmed. Another star has been identified with a common proper motion at an angular separation of 116 arcseconds and a visual magnitude of 12.1. This would place it approximately 18,000 AU away, giving it an orbit of about 1 million years. However, measurements by the Gaia spacecraft found it to be much farther away than Iota, and thus is not a member of the system.
