= Mother Camels =

The protecting Mother Camels (Arabic العوائذ alʽawaʼid) is an asterism in the constellation of Draco described by ancient Arabic nomadic tribes. The asterism was interpreted as a ring of mother camels – Beta Draconis (Rastaban), Gamma Draconis (Eltanin), Nu Draconis (Kuma) and Xi Draconis (Grumium) – surrounding a foal (the faint star Alruba), with another mother camel, Mu Draconis (Alrakis) running to join them.

The Arabs did not see the constellation Draco as it is now. The Mother Camels were protecting the foal from the attack of two wolves or jackals – Zeta Draconis (Aldhibah) and Eta Draconis (Athebyne). The faint pair Omega Draconis and 27 Draconis was known as the "wolf's claws" (الأظفار الذئب al-ʼaẓfār al-dhiʼb).
