= Eta Cygni =

Star in the constellation Cygnus

- Location of η Cygni (circled)

Observation data Epoch J2000.0 Equinox J2000.0 (ICRS)
- Constellation: Cygnus
- Right ascension: 19^{h} 56^{m} 18.37184^{s}
- Declination: +35° 05′ 00.3224″
- Apparent magnitude (V): 3.889

Characteristics
- Evolutionary stage: red clump
- Spectral type: K0 III
- U−B color index: +0.881
- B−V color index: +1.035

Astrometry
Radial velocity (R_{v})	−26.57±0.34 km/s
Proper motion (μ)	RA: −34.165 mas/yr Dec.: −28.393 mas/yr
Parallax (π)	23.5482±0.1078 mas
Distance	138.5 ± 0.6 ly (42.5 ± 0.2 pc)
Absolute magnitude (M_{V})	0.74

Details
Mass	0.9±0.1 M_{☉}
Radius	10.43±0.05 R_{☉}
Luminosity	60 L_{☉}
Surface gravity (log g)	2.36±0.08 cgs
Temperature	4,783±20 K
Metallicity [Fe/H]	−0.02 dex
Rotational velocity (v sin i)	2.2 km/s

Other designations
- Almighzal, η Cygni, 21 Cygni, BD+34 3798, HD 188947, HIP 98110, HR 7615, SAO 69116, TYC 2677-1816-1, IRAS 19544+3456

Database references
SIMBAD	data

Eta Cygni is a star in the northern constellation of Cygnus. It has the proper name Almighzal; Eta Cygni is its Bayer designation, which is Latinized from η Cygni and abbreviated Eta Cygni or η Cyg. This star visible to the naked eye with an apparent visual magnitude of 3.889. It lies along the main body of the constellation, about midway between Gamma Cygni and Albireo. Based upon an annual parallax shift of 23.55 mas, it is located at a distance of 138.5 light-years (42.5 pc) from the Sun.

This is an evolved red clump giant star with a stellar classification of K0 III. It is presently on the horizontal branch and is generating energy through the nuclear fusion of helium at its core. The star has about 0.9 times the mass of the Sun and has expanded to 10 time the Sun's radius. It radiates 60 times the solar luminosity from its outer atmosphere at an effective temperature of 4,780 K.

Eta Cygni has five visual companions, of which only component B appears to be physically associated. This magnitude 12.0 star lies at an angular separation of 7.80 arc seconds along a position angle of 206°, as of 2007.

Al-Mighzal (المِغْزَل), the Wool Spindle, is an Arabic name for the "Northern Cross" of Cygnus, used in oral tradition in Saudi Arabia. The IAU Working Group on Star Names adopted the name Almighzal for this star on 16 July 2026.
