= Delta Geminorum =

Star in the constellation Gemini

- Location of δ Geminorum (circled)

Observation data Epoch J2000 Equinox ICRS
- Constellation: Gemini
- δ Gem A
- Right ascension: 07^{h} 20^{m} 07.3746^{s}
- Declination: +21° 58′ 56.295″
- Apparent magnitude (V): +3.53
- δ Gem B
- Right ascension: 07^{h} 20^{m} 07.0768^{s}
- Declination: +21° 58′ 52.183″
- Apparent magnitude (V): +8.18

Characteristics

δ Gem A
- Evolutionary stage: main sequence
- Spectral type: F2VkF0mF0
- U−B color index: +0.04
- B−V color index: +0.34

δ Gem B
- Spectral type: K6V

Astrometry

δ Gem A
Radial velocity (R_{v})	−15.3±1.5 km/s
Proper motion (μ)	RA: –27.722 mas/yr Dec.: –14.702 mas/yr
Parallax (π)	53.7692±0.2403 mas
Distance	60.7 ± 0.3 ly (18.60 ± 0.08 pc)
Absolute magnitude (M_{V})	+1.95

δ Gem B
Proper motion (μ)	RA: −28.196 mas/yr Dec.: +13.306 mas/yr
Parallax (π)	53.9507±0.0452 mas
Distance	60.45 ± 0.05 ly (18.54 ± 0.02 pc)

Orbit
Period (P)	550±450 yr
Semi-major axis (a)	13.8±1.6" (257 AU (Note: Semi-major axis in AU = $\frac{semimajor\ axis\ in\ seconds}{parallax\ in\ seconds}\ {{=}}\ \frac{13.8}{.0537692}$ = 257 AU; as the eccentricity is 0.98, the distance fluctuates between 2% and 198% of that, roughly from 5.13 AU to 508 AU.))
Eccentricity (e)	0.98±0.30
Inclination (i)	75±10°
Longitude of the node (Ω)	128±51°
Periastron epoch (T)	2136±57
Argument of periastron (ω) (secondary)	266±32°

Details

δ Gem A
Mass	1.57 M_{☉}
Radius	2.06±0.25 R_{☉}
Luminosity	9.88 L_{☉}
Temperature	6,900 K
Metallicity [Fe/H]	–0.26 dex
Rotational velocity (v sin i)	129.7 km/s
Age	1.6 Gyr

δ Gem B
Mass	0.810+0.111 −0.080 M_{☉}
Radius	0.597+0.043 −0.039 R_{☉}
Luminosity	0.189+0.006 −0.005 L_{☉}
Surface gravity (log g)	4.795+0.115 −0.067 cgs
Temperature	4,931+123 −138 K

Other designations
- Wasat, 55 Geminorum, BD+22°1645, FK5 279, Gl 271, HD 56986, HIP 35550, HR 2777, SAO 79294

Database references
SIMBAD	δ Gem A
- δ Gem B

Delta Geminorum (δ Geminorum, abbreviated Delta Gem, δ Gem), formally named Wasat /ˈweɪsət/, is a binary star system in the constellation of Gemini.

== Nomenclature ==
δ Geminorum (Latinised to Delta Geminorum) is the system's Bayer designation.

It bore the traditional name Wasat, which derives from the Arabic word for "middle". In 2016, the International Astronomical Union organized a Working Group on Star Names (WGSN) to catalogue and standardize proper names for stars. The WGSN approved the name Wasat for Delta Geminorum A on 21 August 2016 and it is now so entered in the IAU Catalog of Star Names.

In Chinese, 天樽 (Tiān Zūn), meaning Celestial Wine Cup, refers to an asterism consisting of Delta Geminorum, 57 Geminorum and Omega Geminorum. Consequently, Delta Geminorum itself is known as 天樽二 (Tiān Zūn èr, English: the Second Star of Celestial Wine Cup.). From this Chinese name, the name Ta Tsun has appeared.

== Properties ==
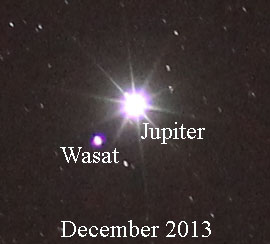
Delta Geminorum is the bright star next to Jupiter. Jupiter is ~280× brighter.

Delta Geminorum A is a main-sequence star with the stellar classification F2VkF0mF0. This star has 1.57 times the mass of the Sun and is rotating rapidly with a projected rotational velocity of 129.7 km s^{−1}. The estimated age is 1.6 billion years.

It has an apparent visual magnitude of +3.53, allowing it to be seen with the naked eye. It is 0.18 degree south of the ecliptic so it is occasionally occulted by the Sun, Moon and, rarely, by a planet; and is eclipsed by the sun from about 10-12 July. Thus the star can be viewed the whole night, crossing the sky, in mid-January. The last occultation by a planet was by Saturn on June 30, 1857, and the next will be by Venus on August 12, 2420. In 1930, the dwarf planet Pluto was discovered about 0.5° to the east of this star by American astronomer Clyde Tombaugh.

Delta Geminorum A has been reported to be a single-lined spectroscopic binary in 1964, with a preliminary orbital solution indicating an orbital period of 2,238.6 days, a minimum semi-major axis of 5.22 au and an eccentricity of 0.353, although these orbital elements could not be confirmed with proper motion measurements and the companion was never directly detected, making it unlikely that Delta Geminorum A is a binary system. The binary mass function, together with the mass of the visible star, would imply a secondary mass of at least 6 solar masses, making it a black hole.

The companion is a cooler class K star, not apparent to the naked eye, but clearly visible in a small telescope. The orbital period is uncertain, 550±450 years, and the eccentricity is also uncertain, at 0.98±0.30. The angular semi-major axis is somewhat better-determined, at 13.8±1.6". The star has 59% the radius of the Sun, 18.9% the luminosity and an effective temperature of 4,952 K.

The system is now approaching the Solar System at a radial velocity of −15.3 km/s, and is expected to reach its closest distance in 1.1 million years, at about 6.7 ly (2.1 pc).
