= HD 171034 =

Star in the constellation Sagittarius

- Location of HD 171034 (circled in red)

Observation data Epoch J2000 Equinox ICRS
- Constellation: Sagittarius
- Right ascension: 18^{h} 33^{m} 57.76631^{s}
- Declination: −33° 00′ 59.6170″
- Apparent magnitude (V): 5.28

Characteristics
- Spectral type: B2III/IV
- B−V color index: −0.115
- Variable type: SPB?

Astrometry
Proper motion (μ)	RA: +1.691 mas/yr Dec.: −11.670 mas/yr
Parallax (π)	2.7191±0.1688 mas
Distance	1,200 ± 70 ly (370 ± 20 pc)
Absolute magnitude (M_{V})	−2.73

Details
Mass	7.3±0.5 M_{☉}
Radius	5.3±0.7 R_{☉}
Luminosity	3200±700 L_{☉}
Surface gravity (log g)	3.81±0.20 cgs
Temperature	18800±900 K
Rotational velocity (v sin i)	107±16 km/s

Other designations
- Alwasl, CD−33 13338, GC 25327, HD 171034, HIP 91014, HR 6960, SAO 210312, PPM 297883

Database references
SIMBAD	data

HD 171034, also named Alwasl, is a star in the constellation Sagittarius, about 1,200 light-years (370 parsecs) distant. With an apparent magnitude of 5.28, it is faintly visible to the naked eye under good viewing conditions. Its stellar classification is variously reported as B2III/IV or B2IV/V, indicating a B-type star of uncertain luminosity class. It is a possible Beta Cephei variable or slowly pulsating B-type star. A companion star at a separation of 0.25″ was first reported in 2010.

In traditional Arab astronomy, al-Waṣl (الوَصْل), meaning the joint or connection, refers to the region between two asterisms in Sagittarius representing groups of ostriches – al-Naʿām al-Wārid "the incoming ostriches" and al-Naʿām al-Ṣādir "the outgoing ostriches". The IAU Working Group on Star Names adopted the name Alwasl for this star on 13 August 2026.
