= Lambda Leonis =

Orange-hued giant star in the constellation Leo

- Location of λ Leonis (circled in red)

Observation data Epoch J2000.0 Equinox ICRS
- Constellation: Leo
- Right ascension: 09^{h} 31^{m} 43.22754^{s}
- Declination: +22° 58′ 04.6904″
- Apparent magnitude (V): 4.32

Characteristics
- Spectral type: K4.5 III
- U−B color index: +1.82
- B−V color index: +1.54

Astrometry
Radial velocity (R_{v})	24.27±0.19 km/s
Proper motion (μ)	RA: −20.17 mas/yr Dec.: −39.47 mas/yr
Parallax (π)	9.91±0.18 mas
Distance	329 ± 6 ly (101 ± 2 pc)
Absolute magnitude (M_{V})	−0.70

Details
Mass	1.29±0.18 M_{☉}
Radius	44.93+0.85 −0.87 R_{☉}
Luminosity	541.4±33.5 L_{☉}
Surface gravity (log g)	1.70 cgs
Temperature	4,152±53 K
Metallicity [Fe/H]	−0.21 dex
Rotational velocity (v sin i)	8 km/s
Age	3.62±1.37 Gyr

Other designations
- Alterf, λ Leo, 4 Leo, BD+23°2107, HD 82308, HIP 46750, HR 3773, SAO 80885

Database references
SIMBAD	data

Lambda Leonis (λ Leonis, abbreviated Lam Leo, λ Leo), formally named Alterf /ælˈtərf/, is a star in the constellation of Leo. The star is bright enough to be seen with the naked eye, having an apparent visual magnitude of 4.32 Based upon an annual parallax shift of 0.00991 arcseconds, it is located about 329 light-years from the Sun. At that distance, the visual magnitude of the star is reduced by an interstellar absorption factor of 0.06 because of extinction.

== Nomenclature ==
λ Leonis (Latinised to Lambda Leonis) is the star's Bayer designation.

It bore the traditional name Alterf, from the Arabic الطرف aṭ-ṭarf "the view (of the lion)". In 2016, the International Astronomical Union (IAU) organized a Working Group on Star Names (WGSN) to catalogue and standardize proper names for stars. The WGSN approved the name Alterf for this star on February 1, 2017 and it is now so included in the List of IAU-approved Star Names.

This star, along with Xi Cancri, were the Persian Nahn, "the Nose", and the Coptic Piautos, "the Eye", both lunar asterisms.

== Properties ==
This is a K-type giant star with a stellar classification of K4.5 III. It is a suspected variable star with a reported magnitude range of 4.28−4.34. Lambda Leonis is 29% more massive than the Sun and is 3.6 billion years old. The interferometry-measured angular diameter of this star, after correcting for limb darkening, is 4.143±0.025 mas, which, at its estimated distance, equates to a physical radius of nearly 45 times the radius of the Sun. It shines with around 540 times the luminosity of the Sun, from an outer atmosphere that has an effective temperature of 4,150 K.
