= Omicron1 Eridani =

Variable star in the constellation Eridanus

ο^{1} Eridani
- Location of ο^{1} Eridani (circled in red)

Observation data Epoch J2000.0 Equinox ICRS
- Constellation: Eridanus
- Right ascension: 04^{h} 11^{m} 51.93956^{s}
- Declination: −06° 50′ 15.2864″
- Apparent magnitude (V): 4.00 to 4.05

Characteristics
- Spectral type: F0 III
- U−B color index: +0.10
- B−V color index: +0.32
- Variable type: δ Scuti

Astrometry
Proper motion (μ)	RA: +10.76 mas/yr Dec.: +81.92 mas/yr
Parallax (π)	26.80±0.32 mas
Distance	122 ± 1 ly (37.3 ± 0.4 pc)
Absolute magnitude (M_{V})	+1.18

Details
Mass	1.95 M_{☉}
Radius	3.7±0.1 R_{☉}
Luminosity	27 L_{☉}
Surface gravity (log g)	3.39 cgs
Temperature	6,963 K
Metallicity [Fe/H]	−0.01 dex
Rotational velocity (v sin i)	108.1 km/s

Other designations
- Beid, ο^{1} Eri, 38 Eri, BD−07°764, FK5 154, HD 26574, HIP 19587, HR 1298, SAO 131019

Database references
SIMBAD	data

Omicron^{1} Eridani (ο^{1} Eridani, abbreviated Omicron^{1} Eri, ο^{1} Eri), also named Beid /ˈbaɪd/, is a variable star in the constellation of Eridanus. With an average apparent visual magnitude of around 4.0, it is visible to the naked eye on a clear, dark night. Based upon parallax measurements, it lies approximately 122 light-years from the Sun.

== Nomenclature ==
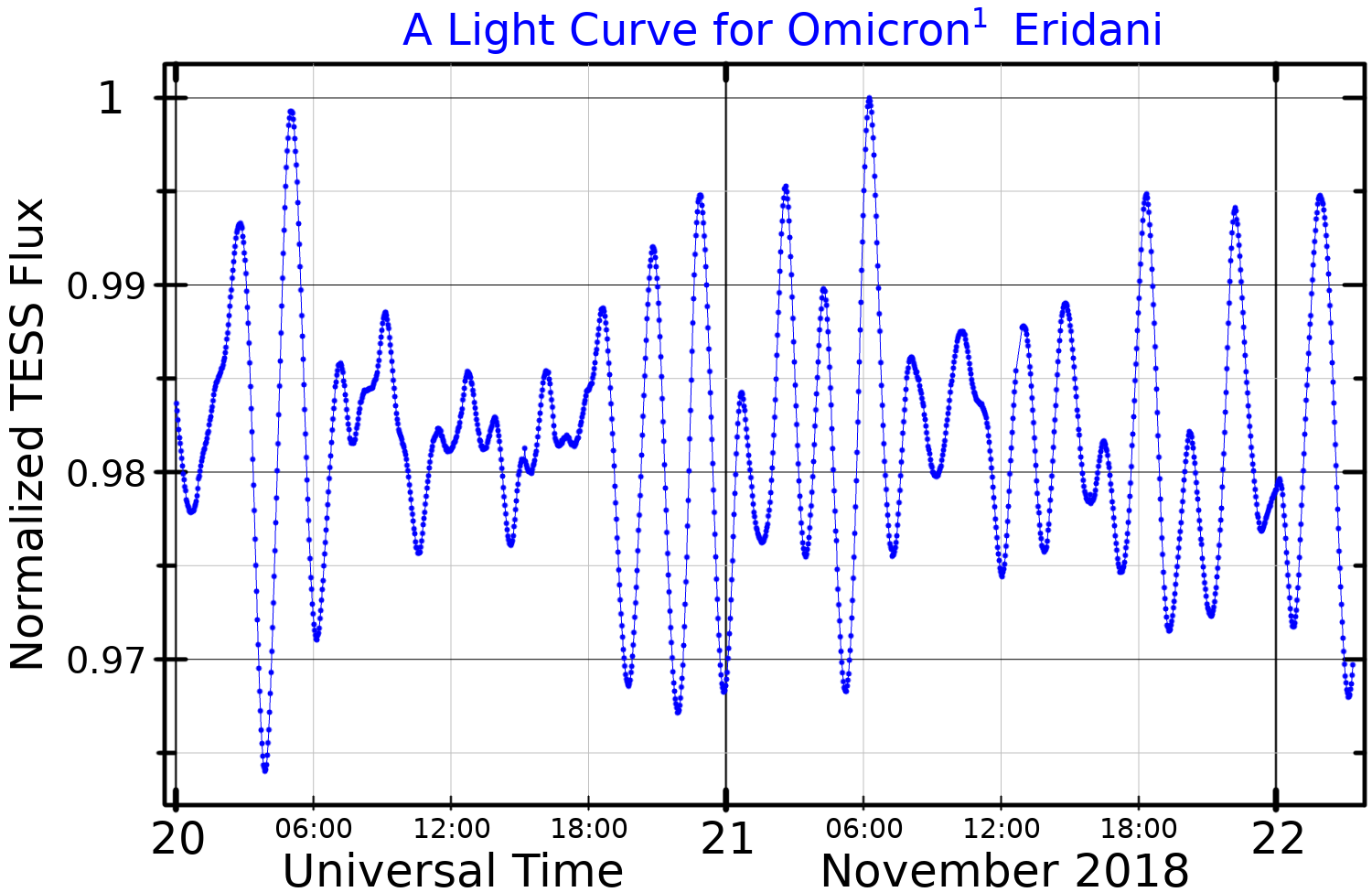
A light curve for Omicron^{1} Eridani, plotted from TESS data

ο^{1} Eridani (Latinised to Omicron^{1} Eridani) is the star's Bayer designation.

The system bears the traditional name Beid derived from the Arabic word بيض bayḍ meaning "eggs" (cf. neighboring Keid "(egg)shells"). In 2016, the International Astronomical Union organized a Working Group on Star Names (WGSN) to catalogue and standardize proper names for stars. The WGSN approved the name Beid for this star on 12 September 2016 and it is now so included in the List of IAU-approved Star Names.

In Chinese, 九州殊口 (Jiǔ Zhōu Shū Kǒu), meaning Interpreters of Nine Dialects, refers to an asterism consisting of ο^{1} Eridani, 39 Eridani, Xi Eridani, Nu Eridani, 56 Eridani and 55 Eridani. Consequently, the Chinese name for Omicron^{1} Eridani itself is 九州殊口二 (Jiǔ Zhōu Shū Kǒu èr, English: the Second Star of Interpreters of Nine Dialects).

== Properties ==
ο^{1} Eridani is an evolved F-type giant star with a stellar classification of F0 III. It is a Delta Scuti variable star that undergoes non-radial pulsations, with a variation of just 0.03 magnitude over a period of 0.0747 days. The star is spinning rapidly with a projected rotational velocity of 108.1 km/s and a rotation period of less than around 1.9 days. This is creating an equatorial bulge that is 11% wider than the polar radius. Omicron^{1} Eridani has nearly double the mass of the Sun, 3.7 times the Sun's radius, and shines with 27 times the solar luminosity from an outer atmosphere at an effective temperature of 6,963 K.
