= Mu Draconis =

Star in the constellation Draco

μ Draconis
- Location of μ Draconis (circled)

Observation data Epoch J2000 Equinox ICRS
- Constellation: Draco
- Right ascension: 17^{h} 05^{m} 20.12403^{s}
- Declination: +54° 28′ 12.0994″
- Apparent magnitude (V): 4.92 (5.66 / 5.69)

Characteristics
- Spectral type: F7V
- U−B color index: −0.01
- B−V color index: +0.47

Astrometry
Radial velocity (R_{v})	−17.30±0.5 km/s
Proper motion (μ)	RA: −58.16 mas/yr Dec.: +67.87 mas/yr
Parallax (π)	36.45±0.46 mas
Distance	89 ± 1 ly (27.4 ± 0.3 pc)
Absolute magnitude (M_{V})	+2.73

Orbit
Primary	μ Dra A
Name	μ Dra B
Period (P)	812.0±70.5 yr
Semi-major axis (a)	4.48±0.03″
Eccentricity (e)	0.5139±0.029
Inclination (i)	142.2±1.3°
Longitude of the node (Ω)	282.85±0.80°
Periastron epoch (T)	1946.19±0.72
Argument of periastron (ω) (secondary)	193.31±0.083°

Details

μ Dra A
Mass	1.35 M_{☉}
Metallicity [Fe/H]	−0.01 dex

μ Dra Ba
Mass	1.30 M_{☉}
Age	2.2 Gyr

μ Dra Bb
Mass	0.20 M_{☉}

Other designations
- 21 Draconis, GJ 9584, BD+54°1857, SAO 30239, HIP 83608
- A: Alrakis, HR 6370, HD 154906
- B: HR 6369, HD 154905

Database references
SIMBAD	μ Dra
- μ Dra A
- μ Dra B

Mu Draconis (μ Draconis, abbreviated Mu Dra, μ Dra) is a multiple star system near the head of the constellation of Draco. With a combined magnitude of 4.92, it is visible to the naked eye. Based on parallax estimates by the Hipparcos spacecraft, it is located approximately 89 light-years from the Sun.

The system consists of a single primary star (designated Mu Draconis A, officially named Alrakis /ælˈreɪkɪs/ from the traditional name of the system), a secondary binary pair (Mu Draconis B) and a further single star (C). B's two components are designated Mu Draconis Ba and Bb.

Mu Draconis A and Ba are nearly identical F-type main-sequence stars, with masses of 1.35 M_{☉} and 1.30 M_{☉}, respectively. Both have the spectral class of F5V, and have similar apparent magnitude, at 5.66 and 5.69, respectively. The secondary, Mu Draconis B, has a drifting radial velocity, and is itself a spectroscopic binary with an orbital period of 2,270 days. The distance between both stars is 2 arcseconds, so a telescope with a diameter of at least 6 centimetres is necessary to see them separate. The smaller component, Mu Draconis Bb, has a mass of 0.2 M_{☉}. Mu Draconis C is a 14th magnitude common-proper-motion companion 13.2" away from the bright pair, with a mass of 0.29 M_{☉}.

== Nomenclature ==
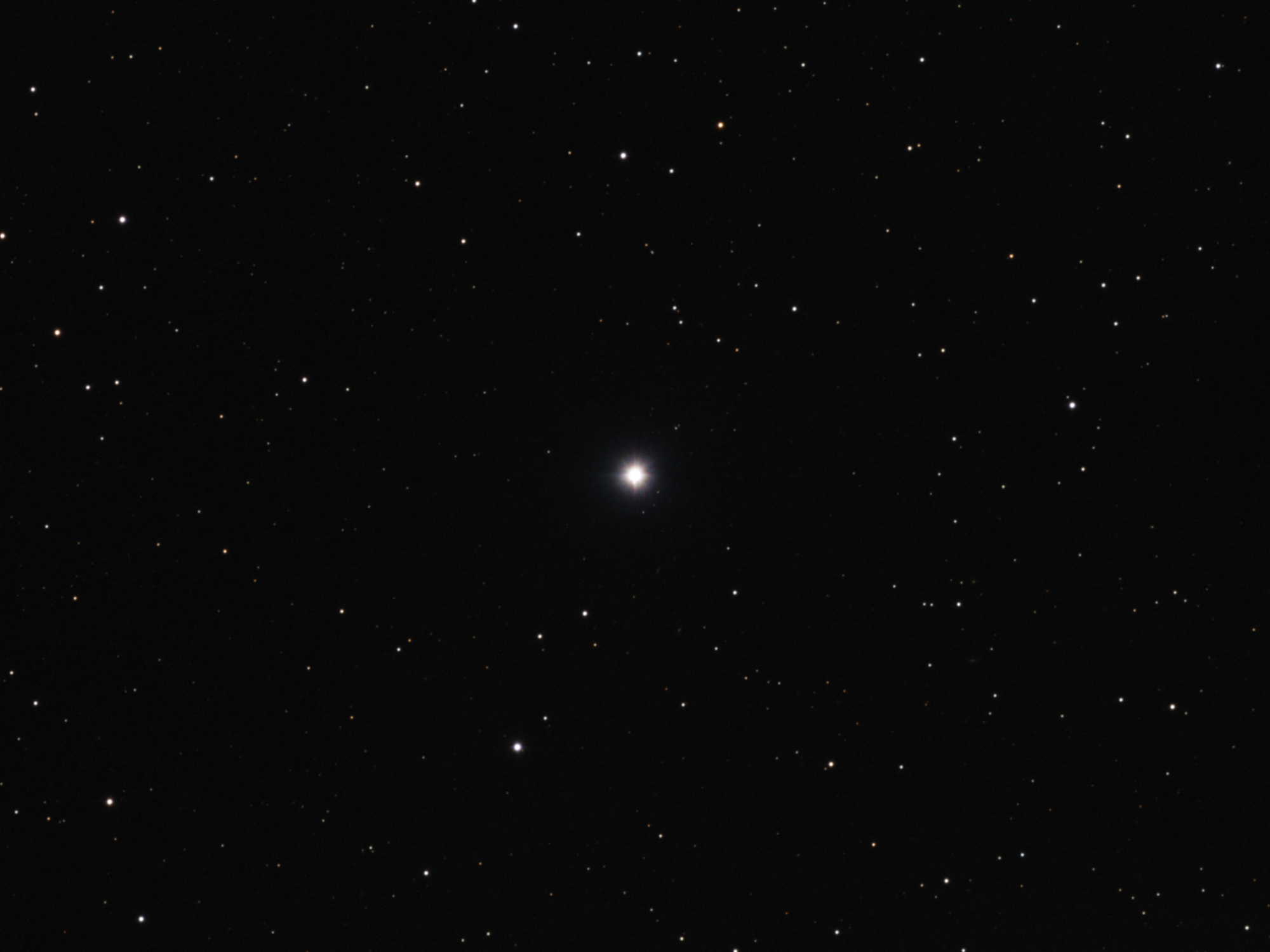
μ Draconis in optical light

μ Draconis (Latinised to Mu Draconis) is the star's Bayer designation. The designations of the three constituents as Mu Draconis A, B and C, and those of B's components - Mu Draconis Ba and Bb - derive from the convention used by the Washington Multiplicity Catalog (WMC) for multiple star systems, and adopted by the International Astronomical Union (IAU).

It is also known by the name Arrakis (or Errakis), which is derived from the name given to it by Arabian stargazers, الراقص al-rāqiṣ "the trotting (camel)" (lit. "the dancing one").

In 2016, the International Astronomical Union organized a Working Group on Star Names (WGSN) to catalogue and standardize proper names for stars. The WGSN decided to attribute proper names to individual stars rather than entire multiple systems. It approved the name Alrakis for the component Mu Draconis A on February 1, 2017, and it is now so included in the List of IAU-approved Star Names.

This star, along with Beta Draconis (Rastaban), Gamma Draconis (Eltanin), Nu Draconis ('Kuma') and Xi Draconis (Grumium) were Al ʽAwāïd, the Mother Camels, which were known in Latin as the Quinque Dromedarii.

== Cultural references ==
Science fiction writer Frank Herbert chose Arrakis as the name of the primary planet of Canopus (α Carinae) in his Dune series of novels, aware that the word "Arrakis" is the transliteration into English of the Arabic words for "the Dancer" (al-Raqis).
