= Nu Draconis =

Star system in the constellation Draco

ν Draconis
- Location of ν Draconis (circled in red)

Observation data Epoch J2000 Equinox ICRS
- Constellation: Draco
- ν^{1} Dra
- Right ascension: 17^{h} 32^{m} 10.56856^{s}
- Declination: +55° 11′ 03.2739″
- Apparent magnitude (V): +4.88
- ν^{2} Dra
- Right ascension: 17^{h} 32^{m} 16.02464^{s}
- Declination: +55° 10′ 22.6504″
- Apparent magnitude (V): +4.88

Characteristics

ν^{1} Dra
- Evolutionary stage: main sequence
- Spectral type: A8Vm (kA3hF0mF0)
- U−B color index: +0.03
- B−V color index: +0.26

ν^{2} Dra
- Evolutionary stage: main sequence
- Spectral type: A4IVm (kA3hF1mF0)
- U−B color index: +0.04
- B−V color index: +0.27

Astrometry

ν^{1} Dra
Radial velocity (R_{v})	−15.2 km/s
Proper motion (μ)	RA: +147.39 mas/yr Dec.: +54.31 mas/yr
Parallax (π)	33.06±0.15 mas
Distance	98.7 ± 0.4 ly (30.2 ± 0.1 pc)

ν^{2} Dra
Radial velocity (R_{v})	−16.0 km/s
Proper motion (μ)	RA: +142.65 mas/yr Dec.: +62.43 mas/yr
Parallax (π)	32.80±0.18 mas
Distance	99.4 ± 0.5 ly (30.5 ± 0.2 pc)

Orbit
Primary	ν^{2} Dra A
Secondary	ν^{2} Dra B
Period (P)	38.034±0.001 d
Eccentricity (e)	0.03±0.05
Semi-amplitude (K_{1}) (primary)	10.0±0.5 km/s

Details

ν^{1} Dra
Mass	1.85 M_{☉}
Radius	1.8 R_{☉}
Luminosity	8.1 L_{☉}
Surface gravity (log g)	4.2 cgs
Temperature	7,533 K
Metallicity	+0.03
Rotational velocity (v sin i)	86 km/s
Age	1.0 Gyr

ν^{2} Dra
Mass	1.61 + 0.24 M_{☉}
Radius	1.812 R_{☉}
Surface gravity (log g)	4.11 cgs
Temperature	7,272 K
Rotational velocity (v sin i)	68 km/s
Age	1.2 Gyr

Other designations
- Kuma, ν Dra
- ν^{1} Dra: 24 Dra, BD+55 1944, FK5 655, HD 159541, HIP 85819, HR 6554, SAO 30447
- ν^{2} Dra: Alawaidh, 25 Dra, BD+55 1945, FK5 657, HD 159560, HIP 85829, HR 6555, SAO 30450

Database references
SIMBAD	ν Dra
- ν^{1} Dra
- ν^{2} Dra

Nu Draconis (Latinized from ν Draconis) is a double star in the constellation Draco. The respective components are designated ν^{1} Draconis and ν^{2} Draconis, the latter (brighter) component having the proper name Alawaidh. The second component is a spectroscopic binary star system.

== Nomenclature ==
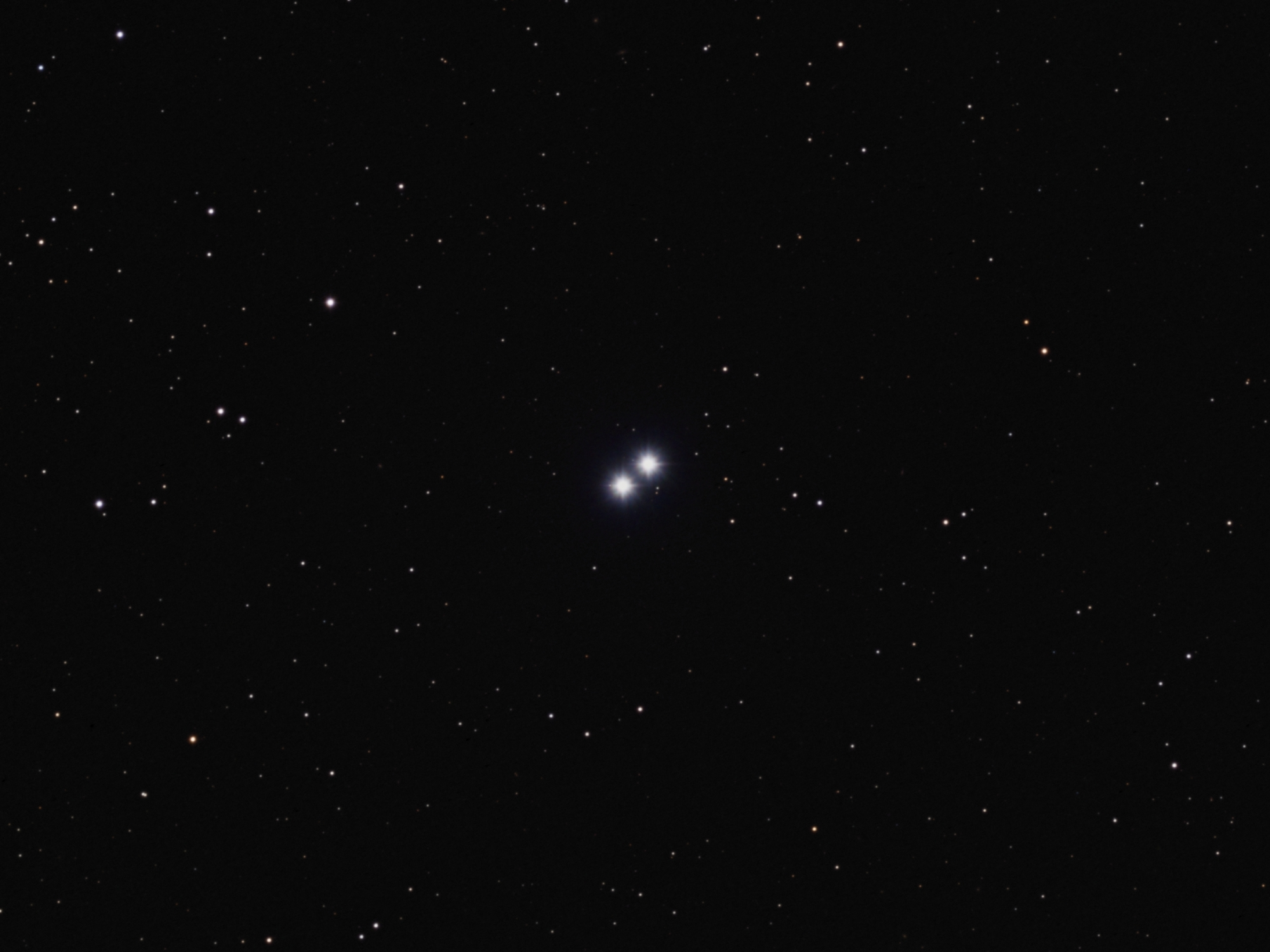
ν Draconis in optical light

ν Draconis, where ν is the Greek letter nu, is the star's Bayer designation; it is Latinized to Nu Draconis and abbreviated ν Dra or Nu Dra. It has been called by the name Kuma /ˈkjuːmə/, which was among the 14 names originating from Antonín Bečvář's 1948 Skalnate Pleso Atlas of the Heavens. James B. Kaler notes that Kuma is of "obscure origin" and noting that one source had postulated it meant "at last".

This star, along with β Draconis (Rastaban), γ Draconis (Eltanin), μ Draconis (Alrakis) and ξ Draconis (Grumium) were the Arabic Al ʽAwāïd, "the Mother Camels", which was later Latinized as the Quinque Dromedarii. The IAU Working Group on Star Names adopted the name Alawaidh for ν^{2} Draconis on 13 May 2026, after this Arabic asterism. The name Kuma was rejected because it is shared with the asteroid 6255 Kuma.

In Chinese astronomy, 天棓 (Tiān Bàng), meaning Celestial Flail, refers to an asterism consisting of ν Draconis, ξ Draconis, β Draconis, γ Draconis and ι Herculis. Consequently, the Chinese name for ν Draconis itself is 天棓二 (Tiān Bàng èr, English: the Second Star of Celestial Flail.)

== Properties ==
The two stars of the visual binary are considered to be a common proper motion pair on the basis of their very similar parallaxes, radial velocities, and proper motions, although no orbital motion can be observed.

ν^{1} Draconis is an Am star, a slowly rotating chemically peculiar star with abnormally strong metallic absorption lines in its spectrum. Its spectral type of kA3hF0mF0 means that it would have a spectral class of A3 if determined solely from its calcium K lines, F0 if determined from its hydrogen lines, and F0 if determined from other metallic spectral lines.

ν^{2} Draconis is a spectroscopic binary with a period of 38 days. The two stars are separated by 0.267 au on average, and they have an almost circular orbit with an eccentricity of 0.03. The primary is also an Am star, while the secondary has a low mass and luminosity and is only inferred from the orbital movement of the more massive star.
