= Beta Draconis =

Binary star system in the constellation Draco

β Draconis
- Location of β Draconis (circled)

Observation data Epoch J2000.0 Equinox J2000.0 (ICRS)
- Constellation: Draco
- Right ascension: 17^{h} 30^{m} 25.96170^{s}
- Declination: +52° 18′ 04.9993″
- Apparent magnitude (V): 2.79

Characteristics
- Spectral type: G2Ib-IIa
- U−B color index: +0.954±0.007
- B−V color index: +0.98
- R−I color index: +0.48

Astrometry
Radial velocity (R_{v})	−21.00±0.23 km/s
Proper motion (μ)	RA: −15.89 mas/yr Dec.: +12.28 mas/yr
Parallax (π)	8.58±0.10 mas
Distance	380 ± 4 ly (117 ± 1 pc)
Absolute magnitude (M_{V})	–2.457

Details
Mass	6.0±0.2 M_{☉}
Radius	42.82±0.50 R_{☉}
Luminosity	996 L_{☉}
Surface gravity (log g)	1.86±0.04 cgs
Temperature	5,160±150 K
Metallicity [Fe/H]	0.02±0.10 dex
Rotational velocity (v sin i)	10.7 km/s
Age	65 Myr

Other designations
- Rastaban, Rastaben, Alwaid, Asuia, NGCA-V25, β Dra, 23 Dra, BD+52°2065, FK5 653, HD 159181, HIP 85670, HR 6536, SAO 30429, ADS 10611, WDS 17304+5218AB

Database references
SIMBAD	data

Beta Draconis is a binary star system and the third-brightest star in the northern circumpolar constellation of Draco. Its name is a Bayer designation that is Latinized from β Draconis and abbreviated Beta Dra or β Dra. The two components are designated Beta Draconis A (officially named Rastaban /ˈræstəbæn/, the traditional name of the system) and B respectively. With a combined apparent visual magnitude of 2.79, it is bright enough to be easily seen with the naked eye. Based upon parallax measurements from the Hipparcos astrometry satellite, it lies at a distance of about 380 light-years (120 parsecs) from the Sun. The system is drifting closer with a radial velocity of −21 km/s.

The binary system consists of a bright giant orbited by a dwarf companion once every four millennia or so. The companion is about 11 magnitudes fainter than the primary star, and the two are separated by 4.2″.

The spectrum of the primary, Beta Draconis A, matches a stellar classification of G2Ib-IIa, showing mixed features of a bright giant and a supergiant star, and is listed as a standard star for that spectral class. It is about 65 million years old and is currently undergoing its first convective dredge-up. Compared to the Sun, Beta Draconis A is an enormous star with six times the mass and roughly 40 times the radius. At this size, it is emitting about 950 times the luminosity of the Sun from its outer envelope at an effective temperature of 5,160 K, giving it the yellow hue of a G-type star. The star has a particularly strong chromospheric emission that is generating X-ray and far-UV radiation. There is a detectable magnetic field with a longitudinal field strength of −1.16±0.25 G.

Beta Draconis lies on or near the cepheid instability strip, yet only appears to be a microvariable with a range of about 1/100 of a magnitude. It was confirmed as a variable star with a range of about 1/100 of a magnitude by Gabriel Cristian Neagu using data from the TESS and Hipparcos missions. The variability was reported to the AAVSO (American Association of Variable Star Observers), in the Variable Star Index.

== Nomenclature ==
β Draconis (Latinised to Beta Draconis) is the system's Bayer designation. The designations of the two components as Beta Draconis A and B derive from the convention used by the Washington Multiplicity Catalog (WMC) for multiple star systems, and adopted by the International Astronomical Union (IAU).

It bore the traditional name Rastaban, which has also been used for Gamma Draconis. This name, less commonly written Rastaben, derives from the Arabic phrase ra's ath-thu'ban "head of the serpent/dragon". It was also known as Asuia and Alwaid /ælˈweɪd/, the latter from the Arabic al-ʽawāʼidh "the old mother camels". In 2016, the IAU organized a Working Group on Star Names (WGSN) to catalogue and standardize proper names for stars. The WGSN approved the name Rastaban for the component Beta Draconis A on 21 August 2016 and it is now so included in the List of IAU-approved Star Names.

Beta Draconis is part of the asterism of the Mother Camels (Arabic al'awa'id), along with Gamma Draconis (Eltanin), Mu Draconis (Alrakis), Nu Draconis (Kuma) and Xi Draconis (Grumium), which was later known as the Quinque Dromedarii.

In Chinese, 天棓 (Tiān Bàng), meaning Celestial Flail, refers to an asterism consisting of Beta Draconis, Xi Draconis, Nu Draconis, Gamma Draconis and Iota Herculis. Consequently, the Chinese name for Beta Draconis itself is known as 天棓三 (Tiān Bàng sān, English: the Third Star of Celestial Flail).
