= Xi Draconis =

Star in the constellation Draco

- Location of ξ Draconis (circled in red)

Observation data Epoch J2000 Equinox ICRS
- Constellation: Draco
- Right ascension: 17^{h} 53^{m} 31.72962^{s}
- Declination: +56° 52′ 21.5143″
- Apparent magnitude (V): 3.75

Characteristics
- Spectral type: K2 III
- U−B color index: +1.21
- B−V color index: +1.18

Astrometry
Radial velocity (R_{v})	−26.38 ± 0.20 km/s
Proper motion (μ)	RA: 93.82 ± 0.14 mas/yr Dec.: 78.50 ± 0.12 mas/yr
Parallax (π)	28.98±0.12 mas
Distance	112.5 ± 0.5 ly (34.5 ± 0.1 pc)
Absolute magnitude (M_{V})	+1.06

Details
Mass	1.45 ± 0.17 M_{☉}
Radius	11.40±0.05 R_{☉}
Luminosity	47.30±0.44 L_{☉}
Surface gravity (log g)	2.3 cgs
Temperature	4,451±7 K
Metallicity [Fe/H]	−0.09 dex
Rotational velocity (v sin i)	2.3 km/s

Other designations
- Grumium, ξ Dra, 32 Dra, BD+56 2033, FK5 671, HD 163588, HIP 87585, HR 6688, SAO 30631, WDS J17535+5652

Database references
SIMBAD	data

Xi Draconis (ξ Draconis, abbreviated Xi Dra, ξ Dra) is a double or binary star in the northern circumpolar constellation of Draco. It has an apparent visual magnitude of 3.75. Based upon parallax measurements, it is located at a distance of 112.5 light-years (34.5 parsecs) from the Sun. At this distance, the apparent magnitude is diminished by 0.03 from extinction caused by intervening gas and dust.

The two components are designated Xi Draconis A (officially named Grumium /ˈɡruːmiəm/, a traditional name for the system) and B.

== Nomenclature ==
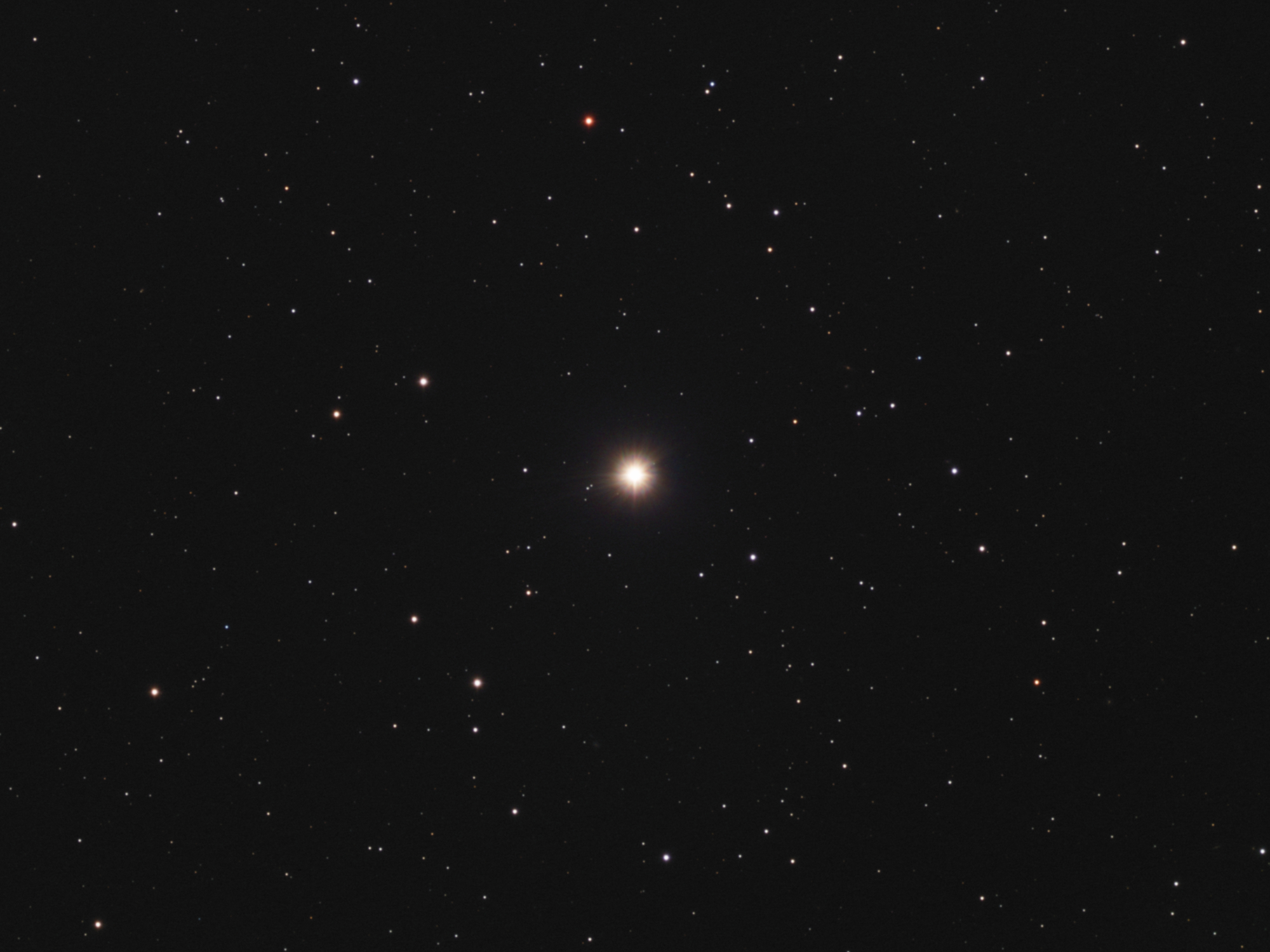
ξ Draconis in optical light

ξ Draconis (Latinised to Xi Draconis) is the system's Bayer designation. The designations of the two components as Xi Draconis A and B derive from the convention used by the Washington Multiplicity Catalog (WMC) for multiple star systems, and adopted by the International Astronomical Union (IAU).

It bore the traditional name Grumium. This is a graphic corruption of the Latin Grunnum 'snout', as Ptolemy had described this star as being on the jawbone of the dragon. In 2016, the International Astronomical Union organized a Working Group on Star Names (WGSN) to catalogue and standardize proper names for stars. The WGSN decided to attribute proper names to individual stars rather than entire multiple systems. It approved the name Grumium for the component Xi Draconis A on 12 September 2016 and it is now so included in the List of IAU-approved Star Names.

This star was also known as Nodus I or Nodus Primus. Along with Beta Draconis (Rastaban), Gamma Draconis (Eltanin), Mu Draconis (Alrakis) and Nu Draconis (Kuma), it was one of Al ʽAwāyd "the Mother Camels", which were later known as the Quinque Dromedarii.

In Chinese, 天棓 (Tiān Bàng), meaning Celestial Flail, refers to an asterism consisting of Xi Draconis, Nu Draconis, Beta Draconis, Gamma Draconis and Iota Herculis. Consequently, the Chinese name for Xi Draconis itself is 天棓一 (Tiān Bàng yī, English: the First Star of Celestial Flail).

=== Namesake ===
USS Grumium (AK-112) was a United States Navy Crater-class cargo ship named after the star.

== Properties ==
Xi Draconis A is of spectral class K2-III. It is not known for certain if Xi Draconis A is on the red giant branch, fusing hydrogen into helium in a shell surrounding an inert helium core, or on the horizontal branch fusing helium into carbon. The possible companion, Xi Draconis B, is a 16th-magnitude star 316 arcseconds away. Jim Kaler in 2008 said that most likely, the pairing is just a line-of-sight coincidence, but Gaia DR3 data shows a similar parallax and proper motion to the primary.
