= Gamma Draconis =

Star in the constellation Draco

- Location of γ Draconis (circled)

Observation data Epoch J2000 Equinox ICRS
- Constellation: Draco
- Right ascension: 17^{h} 56^{m} 36.36988^{s}
- Declination: +51° 29′ 20.0242″
- Apparent magnitude (V): 2.23

Characteristics
- Spectral type: K5 III
- U−B color index: +1.87
- B−V color index: +1.52

Astrometry
Radial velocity (R_{v})	28.19±0.36 km/s
Proper motion (μ)	RA: −8.48 mas/yr Dec.: −22.79 mas/yr
Parallax (π)	21.14±0.10 mas
Distance	154.3 ± 0.7 ly (47.3 ± 0.2 pc)
Absolute magnitude (M_{V})	−1.93 ± 0.07

Details
Mass	2.14±0.16 M_{☉}
Radius	51.8±0.26 R_{☉}
Luminosity	598±21 L_{☉}
Surface gravity (log g)	1.33±0.04 cgs
Temperature	3,964±34 K
Metallicity [Fe/H]	+0.11±0.05 dex
Rotational velocity (v sin i)	4.5±0.05 km/s
Age	1.3±0.25 Gyr

Other designations
- Eltanin, γ Dra, 33 Dra, BD+51°2282, FK5 676, HD 164058, HIP 87833, HR 6705, SAO 30653

Database references
SIMBAD	data

Gamma Draconis is a star in the northern constellation of Draco. It has the proper name Eltanin, pronounced /ɛlˈteɪnɪn/; Gamma Draconis is its Bayer designation. Contrary to its gamma-designation (historically third-ranked), it is the brightest object in Draco at magnitude 2.2, outshining Beta Draconis by nearly half a magnitude and Alpha Draconis by over a magnitude.

Gamma Draconis is at a distance of 154.3 light-years (47.3 parsecs) from the Sun, as determined by parallax measurements from the Hipparcos astrometry satellite. In 1728, while unsuccessfully attempting to measure the star's parallax, James Bradley discovered the aberration of light resulting from the relative movement of the Earth. Bradley's discovery confirmed Copernicus' theory that the Earth revolved around the Sun. It is drifting closer to the Solar System with a radial velocity of about –28 km/s.

In 1.5 million years, Gamma Draconis will pass within 28 light-years of Earth. For a period, if its current absolute magnitude does not change, it will be the brightest star in the night sky, nearly as bright as Sirius is at present. Nearby this red star to the south-southeast is Vega, a bright, well-known star in Lyra.

== Nomenclature ==
γ Draconis (Latinised to Gamma Draconis, abbreviated Gamma Dra, γ Dra) is the star's Bayer designation.

It bore the traditional name Eltanin (historically also seen with other spellings like Etamin) derived from the Arabic التنين Al’ Tinnin 'the great serpent'. The name Rastaban was formerly used for Gamma Draconis, and the two terms share an Arabic root meaning "serpent" or "dragon". In 2016, the International Astronomical Union organized a Working Group on Star Names (WGSN) to catalogue and standardize proper names for stars. The WGSN approved the name Eltanin for this star on 21 August 2016 and it is now so entered in the IAU Catalog of Star Names.

In traditional Arabic astronomy, Gamma Draconis, along with Beta Draconis, Mu Draconis, Nu Draconis, and Xi Draconis were Al ʽAwāïd, the Mother Camels, which was later known as the Quinque Dromedarii.

In Chinese, 天棓 (Tiān Bàng), meaning Celestial Flail, refers to an asterism consisting of Gamma Draconis, Xi Draconis, Nu Draconis, Beta Draconis and Iota Herculis. Consequently, the Chinese name for Gamma Draconis itself is 天棓四 (Tiān Bàng sì, English: the Fourth Star of Celestial Flail.)

== Observational history ==
Gamma Draconis lies near the zenith of Greenwich, London, and so has been known as the "zenith star" in that region. This made it an object of interest for 17th- and 18th-century English astronomers, including Robert Hooke, to attempt to measure its parallax. In 1728, while unsuccessfully attempting to measure the star's parallax, James Bradley discovered the aberration of light resulting from the relative movement of the Earth. Bradley's discovery was thought to confirm Copernicus' theory that the Earth revolved around the Sun. Due to its historical significance, George Airy in 1873 called it "the birth-star of modern astronomy".

== Properties ==
Gamma Draconis is an evolved giant star with a stellar classification of K5 III. Since 1943, the spectrum of this star has served as one of the stable anchor points by which other stars are classified. It has about two times more mass than the Sun and it has expanded to around 50 times its size. It is radiating about 600 times as much luminosity as the Sun from its outer atmosphere at an effective temperature of 3,964 K. This is cooler than the Sun, giving this star the orange-hued glow of a K-type star.

Gamma Draconis has six companions listed in double star catalogues. All were discovered by the American astronomer Sherburne Wesley Burnham. The closest may be physically associated and would be separated by about 1,000 AU. The luminosity of this object suggests it is a red dwarf star. The others are all much more distant stars unrelated to Gamma Draconis.

The star displays periodic radial velocity variations that had been suspected to be caused by an orbiting planet, but later turned out to be caused by intrinsic stellar variability. Similar variability may exist in other giant stars, such as 42 Draconis and Aldebaran, resulting in false positive planet detections.

== In culture ==
USS Etamin was a United States Navy Crater class cargo ship named after the star.

Ursula K. Le Guin's novel Planet of Exile is set on the third planet orbiting Gamma Draconis.

== See also ==
- List of stars in Draco
