= Draco (constellation) =

Constellation in the northern celestial hemisphere

- Constellation
- List of stars in Draco
- Abbreviation: Dra
- Genitive: Draconis
- Pronunciation: /ˈdreɪkoʊ/; genitive /drəˈkoʊnɪs/
- Symbolism: the Dragon
- Right ascension: 17^{h}
- Declination: +65°
- Quadrant: NQ3
- Area: 1083 sq. deg. (8th)
- Main stars: 17
- Bayer/Flamsteed stars: 76
- Stars brighter than 3.00^{m}: 3
- Stars within 10.00 pc (32.62 ly): 7
- Brightest star: γ Dra (Eltanin) (2.24^{m})
- Nearest star: Struve 2398
- Messier objects: 1
- Meteor showers: Draconids
- Bordering constellations: Boötes; Hercules; Lyra; Cygnus; Cepheus; Ursa Minor; Camelopardalis; Ursa Major
- Visible at latitudes between +90° and −7°. Best visible at 21:00 (9 p.m.) during the month of July.

Draco is a constellation in the far northern sky. Its name is derived from the Latin word for dragon. It was one of the 48 constellations listed by the 2nd century Greek astronomer Ptolemy, and remains one of the 88 modern constellations today. The north pole of the ecliptic is in Draco. Draco is circumpolar from northern latitudes, meaning that it never sets and can be seen at any time of year.

== Features ==
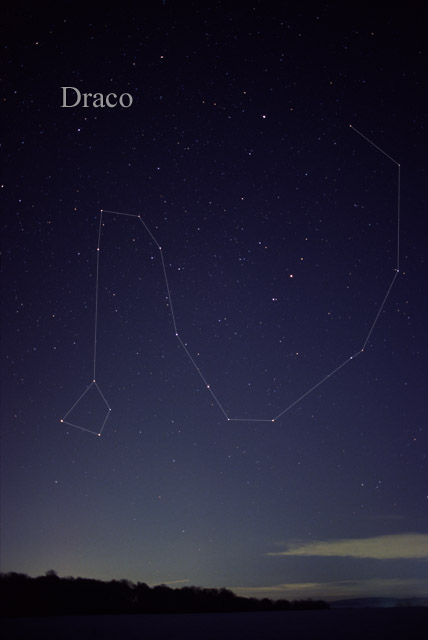
Draco in the night sky

The constellation Draco showing the IAU boundaries, the constellation stick figure, and labels for its brightest stars. Astrophotograph by Eckhard Slawik, from NOIRLab's 88 Constellations project.

=== Stars ===
Thuban (α Draconis) was the northern pole star from 3942 BC, when it moved farther north than Theta Boötis, until 1793 BC. The Egyptian Pyramids were designed to have one side facing north, with an entrance passage geometrically aligned so that Thuban would be visible at night. Due to the effects of precession, it will again be the pole star around the year AD 21000. It is a blue-white giant star of magnitude 3.7, 309 light-years from Earth. The traditional name of Alpha Draconis, Thuban, means "head of the serpent".

There are three stars above magnitude 3 in Draco. The brighter of the three, and the brightest star in Draco, is Gamma Draconis, traditionally called Etamin or Eltanin. It is an orange giant star of magnitude 2.2, 148 light-years from Earth. The aberration of starlight was discovered in 1728 when James Bradley observed Gamma Draconis. Nearby Beta Draconis, traditionally called Rastaban, is a yellow giant star of magnitude 2.8, 362 light-years from Earth. Its name shares a meaning with Thuban, "head of the serpent". Draco also features several interacting galaxies and galaxy clusters. One such massive cluster is Abell 2218, located at a distance of 3 billion light-years (redshift 0.171).

Draco is home to several double stars and binary stars. Eta Draconis (traditionally called Athebyne) is a double star with a yellow-hued primary of magnitude 2.8 and a white-hued secondary of magnitude 8.2 located south of the primary. The two are separated by 4.8 arcseconds. Mu Draconis (traditionally called Alrakis) is a binary star with two white components. Magnitude 5.6 and 5.7, the two components orbit each other every 670 years. The Alrakis system is 88 light-years from Earth. Nu Draconis is a similar binary star with two white components, 100 light-years from Earth. Both components are of magnitude 4.9 and can be distinguished in a small amateur telescope or a pair of binoculars. Omicron Draconis is a double star divisible in small telescopes. The primary is an orange giant of magnitude 4.6, 322 light-years from Earth. The secondary is of magnitude 7.8. Psi Draconis (traditionally called Dziban) is a binary star divisible in binoculars and small amateur telescopes, 72 light-years from Earth. The primary is a yellow-white star of magnitude 4.6 and the secondary is a yellow star of magnitude 5.8. 20 Draconis is a binary star with a white-hued primary of magnitude 7.1 and a yellow-hued secondary of magnitude 7.3 located east-northeast of the primary. The two are separated by 1.2 arcseconds at their maximum and have an orbital period of 420 years. As of 2012, the two components are approaching their maximum separation. 40 Draconis and 41 Draconis are a binary star divisible in small telescopes. The two orange dwarf stars are 170 light-years from Earth and are of magnitude 5.7 and 6.1.

16 Draconis and 17 Draconis are part of a triple star 400 light-years from Earth, visible in medium-sized amateur telescopes. The primary, a blue-white star of magnitude 5.1, is itself a binary with components of magnitude 5.4 and 6.5. The secondary is of magnitude 5.5 and the system is 400 light-years away. 39 Draconis is a triple star 188 light-years from Earth, divisible in small amateur telescopes. The primary is a blue star of magnitude 5.0, the secondary is a yellow star of magnitude 7.4, and the tertiary is a star of magnitude 8.0; the tertiary appears to be a close companion to the primary.

R Draconis is a red Mira-type variable star with a period of about 8 months. Its average minimum magnitude is approximately 12.4, and its average maximum magnitude is approximately 7.6. It was discovered to be a variable star by Hans Geelmuyden in 1876.

The constellation contains the star recently named Kepler-10, which has been confirmed to be orbited by Kepler-10b.

=== Deep-sky objects ===
One of the deep-sky objects in Draco is the Cat's Eye Nebula (NGC 6543), a planetary nebula approximately 3,000 light-years away that was discovered by English astronomer William Herschel in 1786. It is 9th magnitude and was named for its appearance in the Hubble Space Telescope, though it appears as a fuzzy blue-green disk in an amateur telescope. NGC 6543 has a very complex shape due to gravitational interactions between the components of the multiple star at its center, the progenitor of the nebula approximately 1,000 years ago. It is located 9.6 arcminutes away from the north ecliptic pole to the west-northwest. It is also related to IC 4677, a nebula that appears as a bar 1.8 arcminutes to the west of the Cat's Eye Nebula. In long-term exposures, IC 4677 appears as a portion of a ring surrounding the planetary nebula.

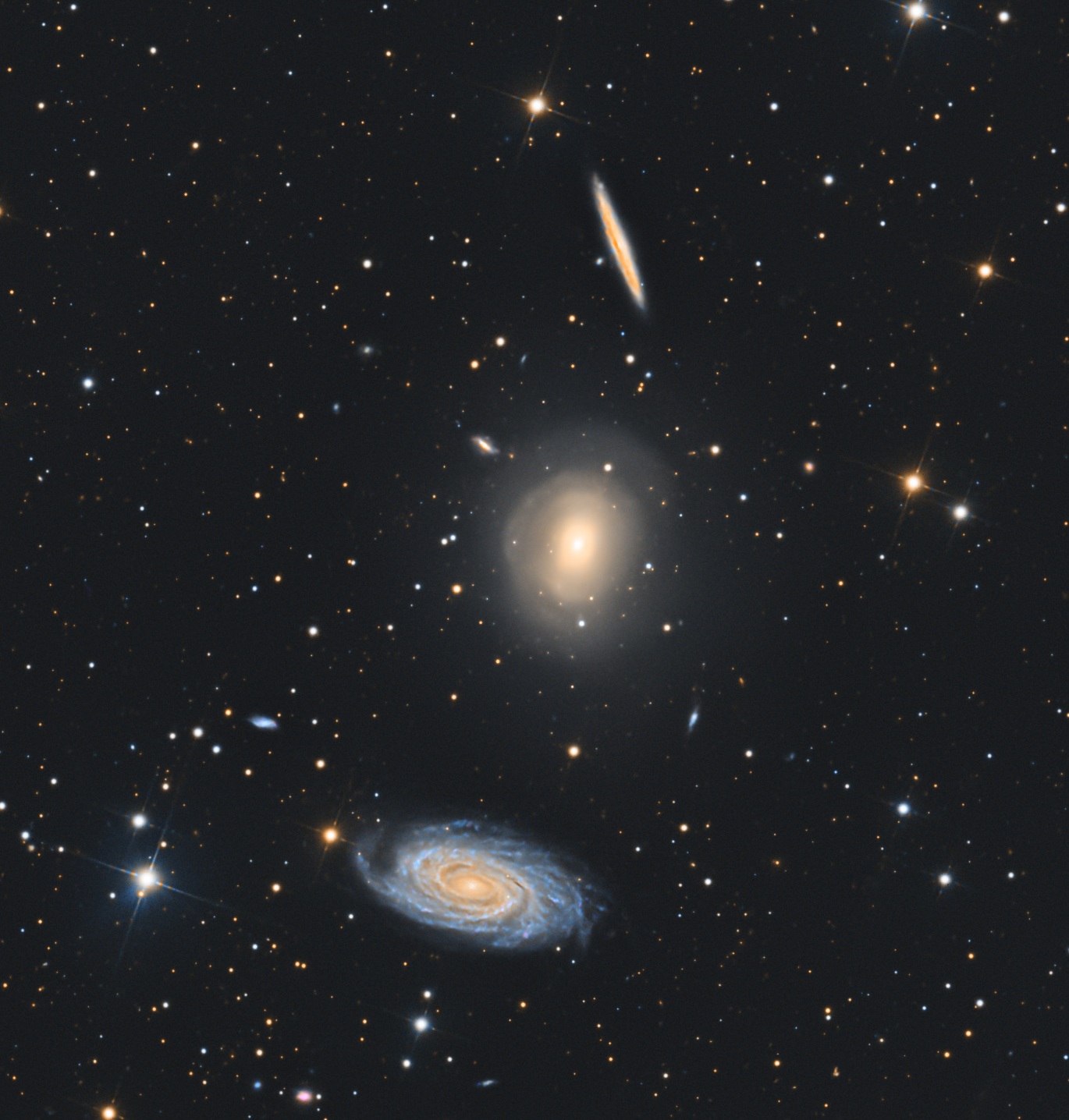
Draco galaxy triplet with NGC 5981 (top), NGC 5982 (middle), and NGC 5985 (bottom)

There are several faint galaxies in Draco, one of which is the Lenticular Galaxy NGC 5866 (sometimes considered to be Messier Object 102) that bears its name to a small group that also includes the spiral galaxies NGC 5879 and NGC 5907. Another is the Draco Dwarf Galaxy, one of the least luminous galaxies with an absolute magnitude of −8.6 and a diameter of only about 3,500 light years, discovered by Albert G. Wilson of Lowell Observatory in 1954. Another dwarf galaxy found in this constellation is PGC 39058.

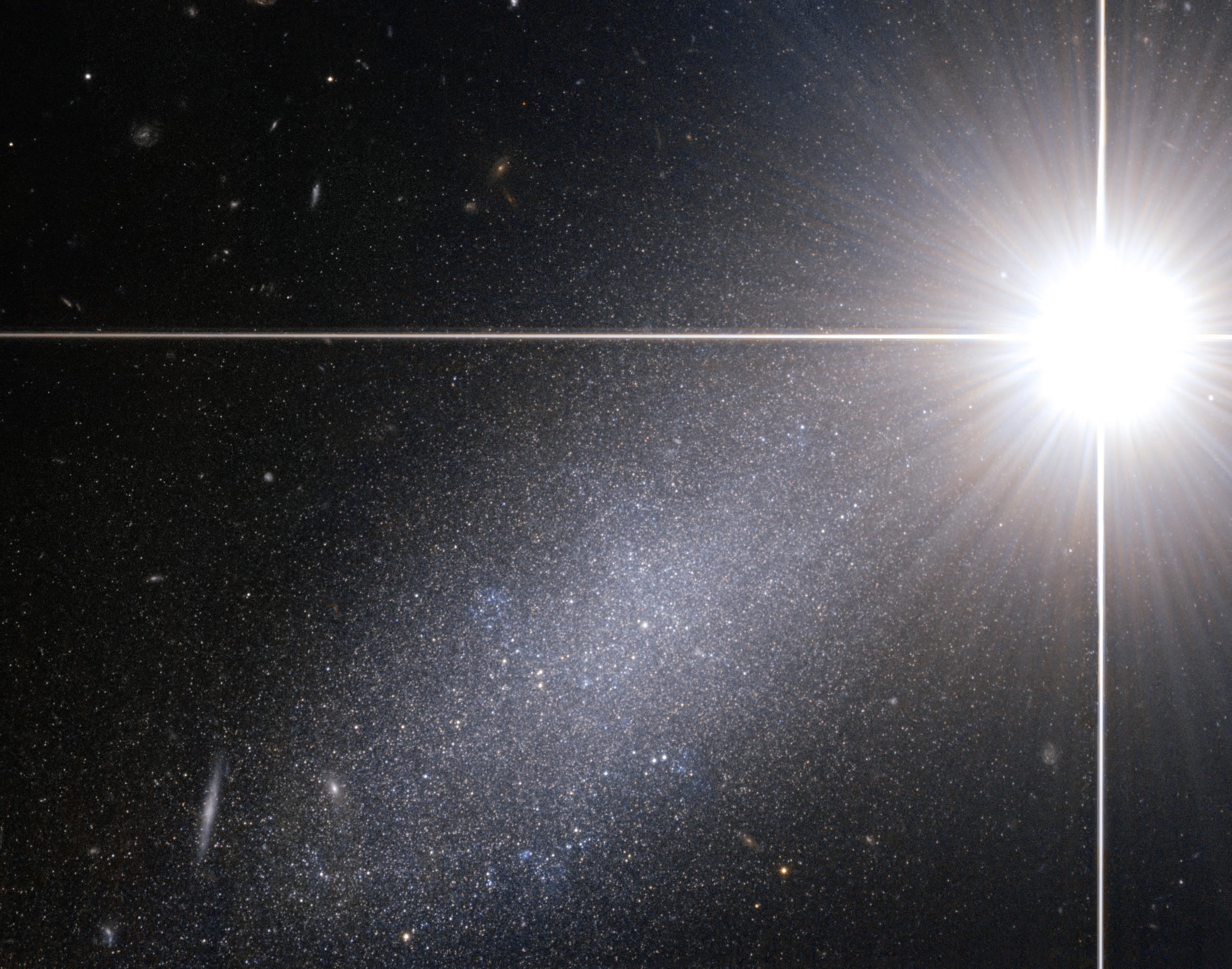
PGC 39058, a dwarf galaxy found within the Draco constellation – picture taken by ESA/Hubble & NASA.

Draco also features several interacting galaxies and galaxy clusters. One such massive cluster is Abell 2218, located at a distance of 3 billion light-years (redshift 0.171). It acts as a gravitational lens for even more distant background galaxies, allowing astronomers to study those galaxies as well as Abell 2218 itself; more specifically, the lensing effect allows astronomers to confirm the cluster's mass as determined by x-ray emissions. One of the most well-known interacting galaxies is Arp 188, also called the "Tadpole Galaxy". Named for its appearance, which features a "tail" of stars 280,000 light-years long, the Tadpole Galaxy is at a distance of 420 million light-years (redshift 0.0314). The tail of stars drawn off the Tadpole Galaxy appears blue because the gravitational interaction disturbed clouds of gas and sparked star formation.

Q1634+706 is a quasar that holds the distinction of being the most distant object usually visible in an amateur telescope. At magnitude 14.4, it appears star-like, though it is at a distance of 12.9 billion light-years. The light of Q1634+706 has taken 8.6 billion years to reach Earth, a discrepancy attributable to the expansion of the universe.

The Hercules–Corona Borealis Great Wall, possibly the largest known structure in the universe, covers a part of the southern region of Draco.

=== Meteor showers ===
The October Draconids, also called Giacobinids, is a meteor shower associated with the periodic comet 21P/Giacobini-Zinner. The shower peaks on 8 October and it has experienced storms in 1933 and 1946, when the zenithal hourly rate (ZHR) was up to 10,000 meteors per hour. Further outbursts were observed in 1985, 1998, and 2011. During the 2011 outburst, ZHR reached 400 meteors/hour, however it was largely unnoticed visually due to interference by the bright Moon.

The February Eta Draconids is a meteor shower that was discovered on February 4, 2011. Observers noted six meteors with a common radiant in a short period. Its parent is a previously unknown long-period comet.

== Mythology ==
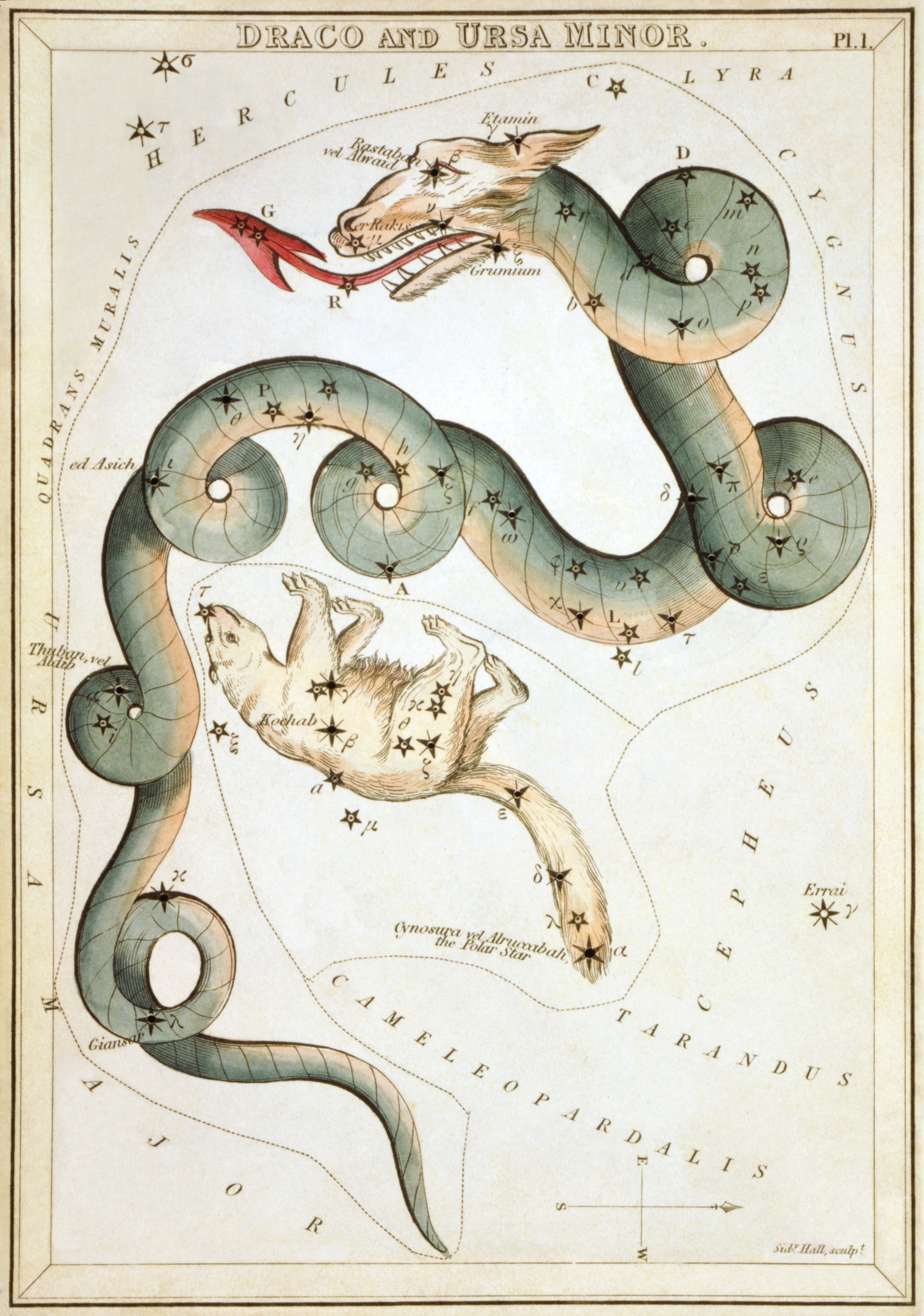
Draco coils around the north celestial pole, as depicted in Urania's Mirror, a set of constellation cards published in London c. 1825

Draco (also known as Ancient Greek: Ὄφις, romanized: Ophis, lit. 'serpent') is one of the 48 constellations listed in Ptolemy's Almagest (2nd century), adopted from the list by Eudoxus of Cnidus (4th century BC).

Draco was identified with several different dragons in Greek mythology. Gaius Julius Hyginus in De Astronomica reports that it was one of the Gigantes, who battled the Olympian gods for ten years in the Gigantomachy, before the goddess Athena killed it and tossed it into the sky upon his defeat. As Athena threw the dragon, it became twisted on itself and froze at the cold north celestial pole before it could right itself. Aelius Aristides names him Aster or Asterius ('star' or 'starry') and says that Athens' Great Panathenaea festival celebrated Athena's victory over him. The festival coincided with the culmination of the constellation's head as seen from the Athenian Acropolis.

The Catasterismi attributed to Eratosthenes identify Draco as Ladon, the dragon who guarded the golden apples of the Hesperides. When Heracles was tasked with stealing the golden apples during his twelve labors, he killed Ladon and Hera transformed Ladon into a constellation. In the sky, Hercules is depicted with one foot on the head of Draco. Sometimes, Draco is represented as the monstrous son of Gaia, Typhon.

Traditional Arabic astronomy does not depict a dragon in modern-day Draco, which is called the Mother Camels. Instead, two hyenas, represented by Eta Draconis and Zeta Draconis are seen attacking a baby camel (a dim star near Beta Draconis), which is protected by four female camels, represented by Beta Draconis, Gamma Draconis, Nu Draconis, and Xi Draconis. The nomads who own the camels are camped nearby, represented by a cooking tripod composed of Upsilon, Tau, and Sigma Draconis. However Arabic astronomers also knew of the Greek interpretation of the constellation, referring to it in Arabic as At-Tinnin (التنين, 'the dragon'), which is the source of the formal name of Gamma Draconis, Eltanin, from raʾs al-tinnīn ('the head of the dragon').

== Namesakes ==
Draco was a United States Navy Crater class cargo ship named after the constellation.

The main character in the 1996 film Dragonheart gets his name from this constellation. The film also reveals that Draco is actually a dragon heaven, where dragons go when their time in this world is complete, if they have upheld the oath of an ancient dragon to guard mankind, with dragons otherwise fading into nothing upon their deaths. At the conclusion of the film, Draco, the last dragon, ascends into the constellation after he sacrifices himself to destroy an evil king.

The Dragon Variation of the Sicilian Defense chess opening was also named after the constellation by Russian chess master Fyodor Dus-Chotimirsky.

Draco Malfoy, an antagonist in the Harry Potter series, is named after the constellation as well.

== See also ==
- 3C 319
- Draco (Chinese astronomy)
- Draco Supercluster
- List of the star names in Draco
