= List of proper names of stars =

These names of stars that have either been approved by the International Astronomical Union or which have been in somewhat recent use. IAU approval comes mostly from its Working Group on Star Names, which has been publishing a "List of IAU-approved Star Names" since 2016. As of October 2026, the list included a total of 652 proper names of stars.

== Background ==
Of the roughly 10,000 stars visible to the naked eye, only a few hundred have been given proper names in the history of astronomy. (Note: NASA compiled a "technical memorandum" collecting a total of 537 named stars in 1971.) Traditional astronomy tends to group stars into constellations or asterisms and give proper names to those, not to individual stars.

Many star names are, in origin, descriptive of the part in the constellation they are found in; thus Phecda, a corruption of Arabic فخذ الدب (fakhdh ad-dubb, 'thigh of the bear'). Only a handful of the brightest stars have individual proper names not depending on their asterism; so Sirius ('the scorcher'), Antares ('rival of Ares', i.e., red-hued like Mars), Canopus (of uncertain origin), Alphard ('the solitary one'), Regulus ('kinglet'); and arguably Aldebaran ('the follower' [of the Pleiades]) and Procyon ('preceding the dog' [Sirius]). The same holds for Chinese star names, where most stars are enumerated within their asterisms, with a handful of exceptions such as 織女 ('weaving girl') (Vega).

In addition to the limited number of traditional star names, there were some coined in modern times, e.g. "Avior" for Epsilon Carinae (1930), and a number of stars named after people (mostly in the 20th century).

== IAU catalog ==
In 2016, the International Astronomical Union (IAU) organized a Working Group on Star Names (WGSN) to catalog and standardize proper names for stars. The WGSN's first bulletin, dated July 2016, included a table of 125 stars comprising the first two batches of names approved by the WGSN (on 30 June and 20 July 2016) together with names of stars adopted by the IAU Executive Committee Working Group on the Public Naming of Planets and Planetary Satellites during the 2015 NameExoWorlds campaign and recognized by the WGSN. Further batches of names were approved on 21 August, 12 September, 5 October, and 6 November 2016. These were listed in a table of 102 stars included in the WGSN's second bulletin, dated November 2016. The next additions were done on 1 February 2017 (13 new star names), 30 June 2017 (29), 5 September 2017 (41), 17 November 2017 (3), 1 June 2018 (17), and on 10 August 2018 (6). All 336 names are included in the current List of IAU-approved Star Names.

In 2019, the IAU organised its IAU 100 NameExoWorlds campaign to name exoplanets and their host stars. The approved names of 112 exoplanets and their host stars were published on 17 December 2019, with an additional pair of names (for the star HAT-P-21 and its planet) approved on 1 March 2020. An additional two star names were approved on 4 April 2022. In June 2023, an additional 20 names were approved in the NameExoWorlds 2022 campaign, bringing the total to 471 named stars.

Since 2024, newly approved names have appeared on the exopla.net website maintained by the WGSN. 19 names were adopted in 2024, and 40 in 2025. As of October 2026, 122 additional star names have been adopted, bringing the total to 652.

== List ==
In the table below, unless indicated by a "†", the "modern proper name" is the name approved by the WGSN and entered in the List of IAU-approved Star Names or otherwise approved by the IAU. The WGSN decided to attribute proper names to individual stars rather than entire multiple-star systems. Names marked with a "†" have not been approved by the IAU.

For such names relating to members of multiple-star systems, and where a component letter (from, e.g., the Washington Double Star Catalog) is not explicitly listed, the WGSN says that the name should be understood to be attributed to the visually brightest component. In the "Historical names/comments" column, "NameExoWorlds [year]" denotes that the name was approved by the IAU as a consequence of that year's NameExoWorlds campaign.

Modern proper name	Designation	Constellation	Name origin	Notes	English pronunciation (Note: Few of these names have established pronunciations in English, and care needs to be taken when interpreting often contradictory sources. For example, as Kunitzsch and Smart explain in their introduction, they sometimes blend Arabic and English pronunciations in novel ways that Latinized Arabic star names were not traditionally pronounced, such as transcribing a as if it were u, or making ante-penultimate vowels long because they were long in Arabic when a literary English pronunciation would make them short. (In some cases, the result is not a possible combination of sounds in English.) Webster's dictionary, Rumrill and Davis may attempt to render the original Arabic pronunciation using English sounds as approximations, and not distinguish that pseudo-Arabic pronunciation from an English pronunciation that people actually use. (Kunitzsch and the OED do try to distinguish these two cases.) Where sources disagree on Latinized Arabic names, the form closest to the traditional English pronunciation of Latin is followed, with the assumption that the usually unmarked Latin vowel length is as faithful to Arabic as it is to Greek.)
Absolutno	XO-5	Lynx	Czech	NameExoWorlds 2019; Czech proposal: A fictional substance in the novel Továrna na absolutno by Karel Čapek.	/æbsəˈluːtnoʊ/, /ˈæbsəluːtnoʊ/
Acamar	θ^{1} Eridani A	Eridanus	Arabic		/ˈækəmɑːr/
Achernar	α Eridani A	Eridanus	Arabic	Arabic: آخر النهر ʾāẖir an-nahr (River's end)	/ˈeɪkərnɑːr/
Achird	η Cassiopeiae A	Cassiopeia	Slovak (1950)	Apparently first applied to η Cassiopeiae in the Skalnate Pleso Atlas of the Heavens published in 1950, but is not known prior to that.	/ˈeɪtʃərd/
Acrab	β^{1} Scorpii Aa	Scorpius	Arabic	The traditional name of the β Scorpii system has been rendered Akrab and Elakrab, derived (like Acrab) from Arabic: العقرب al-ʿaqrab ('the scorpion').	/ˈeɪkræb/
Acrux	α Crucis Aa	Crux	American	"Acrux" is a modern contraction of the Bayer designation, coined by astronomer Elijah Hinsdale Burritt (1794–1838).	/ˈeɪkrʌks/
Acubens	α Cancri A	Cancer	Arabic	The name was originally Arabic: الزبانى az-zubāná ('the claws').	/ˈækjuːbɛnz/
Adhafera	ζ Leonis	Leo	Arabic	Also called Aldhafera. The name is originally from Arabic: الضفيرة aḍ-ḍafīra ('the braid (or curl, or strand)' [of the lion's mane]).	/ædəˈfɪərə/
Adhara	ε Canis Majoris A	Canis Major	Arabic	The name is originally from Arabic: عذارى ʿaḏārá ('virgins'). In the Calendarium of Al Achsasi Al Mouakket, it is designated أول العذاري ʾawwil al-ʿaḏāriyy, translated into Latin as Prima Virginum ('first virgin').	/əˈdɛərə/
Adhil	ξ Andromedae	Andromeda	Arabic	The name was originally Arabic: الذيل aḏ-ḏayl (the train, lit. 'the tail').	/əˈdɪl/
Aerostaticus	ε Microscopii	Microscopium	Latin	From the historical constellation Globus Aerostaticus, the hot air balloon.	
Ain	ε Tauri	Taurus	Arabic	The name is originally from Arabic: عين ʿayn ('eye') and was reviewed and adopted by the Working Group on Star Names.	/ˈeɪn/
Ainalrami	ν^{1} Sagittarii A	Sagittarius	Arabic	From Arabic: عين الرامي ʿayn ar-rāmī ('eye of the archer').	/ˌɛnəlˈreɪmi/
Aiolos	HD 95086	Carina	Greek	NameExoWorlds 2022; Greek proposal; named after Aeolus, a god from Greek mythology.	
Aladfar	η Lyrae Aa	Lyra	Arabic	The name is originally from Arabic: الأظفر al-ʾuẓfur ('the talons' [of the swooping eagle]), shared with μ Lyrae (Alathfar).	/əˈlædfɑːr/
Alasia	HD 168746	Serpens	Cypriot	NameExoWorlds 2019; Cypriot proposal; first historically recorded name of Cyprus (mid-15th century).	/əˈleɪziə/
Alawaidh	ν^{2} Draconis	Draco	Arabic	From the Arabic asterism al-ʿAwāʾidh (العَوائِذ), the Mother Camels, including this and three other stars. Also called Kuma in Antonín Bečvář's 1948 star atlas, Atlas Coeli Skalnaté Pleso.	
Alaybasan	β Trianguli A	Triangulum	Arabic	From the Arabic asterism Al-Aybasān (الأيبسان), the Two Joints.	
Albaldah	π Sagittarii A	Sagittarius	Arabic	The name is originally from Arabic: البلدة al-balda ('town'). In the Calendarium of Al Achsasi Al Mouakket, it is designated نير البلدة nayyir al-baldah, translated into Latin as Lucida Oppidi ('brightest of the town').	/ælˈbɔːldə/
Albali	ε Aquarii	Aquarius	Arabic	The name is originally from Arabic: البالع al-bāliʿ ('the swallower').	/ælˈbeɪli/
Albireo	β^{1} Cygni Aa	Cygnus	unknown	The source of the name Albireo is not entirely clear. (Note: Allen (1899) sees the name as originating from a misunderstanding of the words ab ireo in the description of Cygnus from Almagest.)	/ælˈbɪrioʊ/
Alchiba	α Corvi A	Corvus	Arabic	From Arabic: الخباء al-ẖibāʾ ('tent'). In the Calendarium of Al Achsasi Al Mouakket, it is designated المنخر الغراب al-manẖar al-ġurāb, translated into Latin as Rostrum Corvi ('beak of the crow').	/ˈælkᵻbə/
Alcor	80 Ursae Majoris Ca	Ursa Major	Arabic	From Arabic: الخوار al‑ẖawwār ('the faint one').	/ˈælkɔːr/
Alcyone	η Tauri A	Taurus	Greek	Member of the Pleiades open star cluster (M45). Alcyone (Ancient Greek: Ἀλκυόνη Alkuonē) was one of the Pleiades sisters in Greek mythology.	/ælˈsaɪəniː/
Aldebaran	α Tauri A	Taurus	Arabic	The name was originally Arabic: الدبران ad-dabarān ('the follower' [of the Pleiades]).	/ælˈdɛbərən/
Alderamin	α Cephei	Cepheus	Arabic	From Arabic: الذراع اليمين aḏ-ḏirāʿ al-yamīn ('the right arm' [of Cepheus]).	/ælˈdɛrəmɪn/
Aldhanab	γ Gruis	Grus	Arabic	The name was originally الذنب aḏ-ḏanab ('the tail' [of the constellation of the Southern Fish]).	/ˈældənæb/
Aldhibah	ζ Draconis A	Draco	Arabic	From Arabic: الضباع aḍ-ḍibāʿ ('the hyenas').	/ælˈdaɪbə/
Áldu	ε Persei A	Perseus	Uralic	Sámi word for a female reindeer, in reference to the Sámi reindeer constellation Sarvvis.	
Aldulfin	ε Delphini	Delphinus	Arabic	Shortening of Arabic: ذنب الدلفين ḏanab ad-dulfīn ('tail of the dolphin').	/ælˈdʌlfən/
Alfarasalkamil	ο Andromedae Aa	Andromeda	Arabic	From the Arabic constellation Al-Faras al-Kamil (الفرس الكامل), the Complete Horse.	
Alfirk	β Cephei Aa	Cepheus	Arabic	From Arabic: الفرق al-firq ('the flock'). Name given by Ulugh Beg to the asterism consisting of α, β and η Cephei.	/ˈælfərk/
Algedi	α^{2} Capricorni	Capricornus	Arabic	From Arabic: الجدي al-jady ('the (male) kid'). Alternative traditional names are Al Giedi, Secunda Giedi and Algiedi Secunda.	/ælˈdʒiːdi/
Algenib	γ Pegasi A	Pegasus	Arabic	From Arabic: الجانب al-jānib ('the flank'). Algenib is also another name for α Persei (Mirfak).	/ælˈdʒiːnᵻb/
Algieba	γ^{1} Leonis A	Leo	Arabic	From Arabic: الجبهة al-jabha ('the forehead' [of the lion]).	/ælˈdʒiːbə/
Algol	β Persei Aa1	Perseus	Arabic	From Arabic: رأس الغول raʾs al-ġūl ('head of the ogre'). In ancient Egypt, the star represented Horus.	/ˈælɡɒl/
Algorab	δ Corvi A	Corvus	Arabic	The traditional name Algorab is derived from Arabic: الغراب al-ġurāb ('the crow').	/ˈælɡəræb/
Alhena	γ Geminorum A	Gemini	Arabic	Derived from Arabic: الهنعة al-hanʿa ('the brand' [on the neck of the camel]).	/ælˈhiːnə/
Alioth	ε Ursae Majoris	Ursa Major	Arabic	Member of the Big Dipper or the Plough (UK). Arabic: alyat al-hamal ('the sheep's fat tail')	/ˈæliɒθ/
Aljanah	ε Cygni Aa	Cygnus	Arabic	Traditional name Gienah from the Arabic al janāħ (Arabic: جناح) meaning 'the wing'.	/ˈældʒənə/
Alkaid	η Ursae Majoris	Ursa Major	Arabic	Member of the Big Dipper or the Plough (UK).	/ælˈkeɪd/
Alkalurops	μ^{1} Boötis Aa	Boötes	Greek	Traditional name Alkalurops from the Greek (καλαύροψ kalaurops) 'a herdsman's crook or staff'. It has Arabic prefix attached.	/ælkəˈljʊərɒps/
Alkaphrah	κ Ursae Majoris A	Ursa Major	Arabic		/ælˈkæfrə/
Alkarab	υ Pegasi	Pegasus	Arabic		/ˈælkəræb/
Alkes	α Crateris	Crater	Arabic	From Arabic: الكاس alkās or Arabic: الكأس alka's ('the cup')	/ˈælkɛs/
Almaaz	ε Aurigae Aa	Auriga	Arabic		/ˈælmeɪ.əz/
Almach	γ Andromedae A	Andromeda	Arabic	Derived from Arabic: العناق al-'anāq ('the caracal' (desert lynx))	/ˈælmæk/
Almighzal	η Cygni A	Cygnus	Arabic	From al-Mighzal (المِغْزَل), the Wool Spindle, a name of Cygnus in Arab oral tradition.	
Al Minliar al Asad†	κ Leonis	Leo	Arabic	From Arabic: أل مينلير أل أسد 'al mynilir 'al 'asad ('lion's nose')	
Alnaamaat	υ Ceti	Cetus	Arabic	From the Arabic asterism Al-Naʿāmāt (النَّعَامَات), 'the ostriches'.	
Alnair	α Gruis	Grus	Arabic		/ælˈnɛər/
Alnasl	γ^{2} Sagittarii	Sagittarius	Arabic	From Arabic: النصل an-naṣl ('the point' [of the archer's arrow]).	/ælˈnæzəl/
Alnilam	ε Orionis	Orion	Arabic	The middle star in Orion's belt. Derived from Arabic: النظام, romanized: al-niẓām, lit. 'arrangement/string (of pearls)'.	/ˈælnᵻlæm/
Alnitak	ζ Orionis Aa	Orion	Arabic	The traditional name, alternately spelled Al Nitak or Alnitah, is from Arabic: النطاق an-niṭāq ('the girdle').	/ˈælnᵻtæk/
Alniyat	σ Scorpii Aa1	Scorpius	Arabic		/ælˈnaɪæt/
Alphard	α Hydrae	Hydra	Arabic		/ˈælfɑːrd/
Alphecca	α Coronae Borealis A	Corona Borealis	Arabic	The name نير الفكة nayyir al-fakka ('bright (star) of the broken' [ring of stars]) is found in the Al Achsasi al Mouakket catalogue (c. 1650).	/ælˈfɛkə/
Alpheratz	α Andromedae Aa	Andromeda	Arabic		/ælˈfɪəræts/
Alpherg	η Piscium A	Pisces	Arabic		/ˈælfɜːrɡ/
Alqiladah	ο Sagittarii	Sagittarius	Arabic	From the Arab asterism al-Qilāda (القِلادَة), the necklace.	
Alqubba	β Coronae Australis	Corona Australis	Arabic	From the Arab asterism al-Qubba (القُبَّة), the domed tent.	
Alrakis	μ Draconis A	Draco	Arabic	From Arabic: الراقص ar-rāqiṣ ('the dancer'); also spelled Arrakis and Elrakis.	/ælˈreɪkᵻs/
Alrescha	α Piscium A	Pisces	Arabic		/ælˈriːʃə/
Alruba	HD 161693	Draco	Arabic	Arabic الربع 'the foal'; at the center of the Mother Camels asterism.	/ælˈruːbə/
Alrumh	34 Boötis	Boötes	Arabic	From the Arabic asterism Al-Rumḥ (الرُّمْح), the Lance.	
Alsafi	σ Draconis	Draco	Arabic		/ælˈseɪfi/
Alsamaka	β Lacertae	Lacerta	Arabic	From the Arabic asterism Al-Samaka al-Ṣuġrā (السمكة الصغرى, The Smaller Fish).	
Alsciaukat	31 Lyncis	Lynx	Arabic		/ælʃiˈɔːkæt/
Alsephina	δ Velorum Aa	Vela	Arabic		/ælsᵻˈfaɪnə/
Alshain	β Aquilae A	Aquila	Persian		/ælˈʃeɪn/
Alshat	ν Capricorni A	Capricornus	Arabic		/ˈælʃæt/
Altair	α Aquilae	Aquila	Arabic	From Arabic: (النسر) الطائر (an-nasr) aṭ-ṭāʾir ('the flying' [eagle]). Altair is one of the vertices of the Summer Triangle asterism.	/ælˈteɪ.ər/
Altais	δ Draconis	Draco	Arabic		/ælˈteɪ.ᵻs/
Alterf	λ Leonis	Leo	Arabic		/ˈæltərf/
Aludra	η Canis Majoris	Canis Major	Arabic		/əˈluːdrə/
Alula Australis	ξ Ursae Majoris Aa	Ursa Major	Arab-Latin		/əˈluːlə ɔːˈstreɪlᵻs/
Alula Borealis	ν Ursae Majoris A	Ursa Major	Arab-Latin		/əˈluːlə bɒriˈælᵻs/
Alwasl	HD 171034	Sagittarius	Arabic	From the Arabic al-Waṣl (الوَصْل), the joint or connection, a region between two asterisms representing groups of ostriches.	
Alya	θ^{1} Serpentis A	Serpens	Arabic		/ˈeɪliə/
Alzirr	ξ Geminorum	Gemini	Arabic	Alternately spelled Alzir.	/ˈælzər/
Amadioha	HD 43197	Canis Major	Nigerian	NameExoWorlds 2019; Nigerian proposal; named after Amadioha, a god in Igbo mythology.	//
Amansinaya	WASP-34	Crater	Filipino	NameExoWorlds 2019; Philippines proposal. Named after Aman Sinaya, deity of the ocean and protector of fishermen in Tagalog mythology.	//
Anadolu	WASP-52	Pegasus	Turkic	NameExoWorlds 2019; Turkish proposal; refers to the motherland in Turkish culture.	//
Añañuca	GJ 367	Vela	Chilean	NameExoWorlds 2022; Chilean proposal; named for the endemic Chilean wildflower Phycella cyrtanthoides.	/aɲaˈɲuka/
Ancha	θ Aquarii	Aquarius	Latin		/ˈæŋkə/
Angetenar	τ^{2} Eridani	Eridanus	Arabic	The name is originally from Arabic: عرجة النهر ʿarjat an-nahr ('the bend of the river').	/ænˈdʒɛtᵻnɑːr/
Aniara	HD 102956	Ursa Major	Swedish	NameExoWorlds 2019; Swedish proposal; name of a spaceship in Aniara, the eponymous poem by Harry Martinson.	//
Ankaa	α Phoenicis	Phoenix	Arabic		/ˈæŋkə/
Anser	α Vulpeculae	Vulpecula	Latin	Alternative traditional name is Lucida Anseris.	/ˈænsər/
Antares	α Scorpii A	Scorpius	Greek	From Ancient Greek: Ἀντάρης Antarēs ('rival of Ares') (Mars).	/ænˈtɛəriːz/
Antinous	θ Aquilae A	Aquila	Latin	From the historical constellation Antinous.	
Anunitu	ε Andromedae	Andromeda	Akkadian	Anunītu, an ancient Mesopotamian goddess whose constellation was visualized in Andromeda and Pisces.	
Apamvatsa	74 Virginis	Virgo	Indic	Apāṃvatsa (अपऻऺवत्स), "calf of the waters", a traditional Indian name.	
Apdu	γ Trianguli	Triangulum	Egyptian	From the ancient Egyptian constellation Apdu, the Bird.	
Arcalís	HD 131496	Boötes	Andorran	NameExoWorlds 2019; Andorran proposal; named after Vallnord, a peak in the north of the country.	//
Arcturus	α Boötis	Boötes	Greek	From ancient Greek Ἀρκτοῦρος (Arktouros), "Guardian of the Bear".	/ɑːrkˈtjʊərəs/
Arin-majlep	ε Aquilae Aa	Aquila	Marshallese	From a Marshallese asterism, the "replica of the Big Eye", with the Big Eye being Altair.	
Arkab Posterior	β^{2} Sagittarii	Sagittarius	Arab-Latin		/ˈɑːrkæb pɒˈstɪəriər/
Arkab Prior	β^{1} Sagittarii	Sagittarius	Arab-Latin		/ˈɑːrkæb ˈpraɪər/
Arneb	α Leporis	Lepus	Arabic	The traditional name Arneb is from Arabic: أرنب ʾarnab ('hare'). (Lepus is Latin for hare.)	/ˈɑːrnɛb/
Ascella	ζ Sagittarii A	Sagittarius	Latin	Part of the Teapot asterism.	/əˈsɛlə/
Asellus Australis	δ Cancri	Cancer	Latin		/əˈsɛləs ɔːsˈtreɪlᵻs/
Asellus Borealis	γ Cancri	Cancer	Latin		/əˈsɛləs bɒriˈælᵻs/
Asellus Primus†	θ Boötis	Boötes	Latin	Latin for 'first donkey colt'.	/əˈsɛləs ˈpraɪməs/
Asellus Secundus†	ι Boötis	Boötes	Latin	Latin for 'second donkey colt'.	/əˈsɛləs sᵻˈkʌndəs/
Asellus Tertius†	κ Boötis	Boötes	Latin	Latin for 'third donkey colt'.	/əˈsɛləs ˈtɜːrʃiəs/
Ashlesha	ε Hydrae A	Hydra	Indic	Āśleṣā (आश्लेषा), the 9th nakshatra in Indian astronomy.	/æʃˈleɪʃə/
Aspidiske	ι Carinae	Carina	Greek		/ˌæspᵻˈdɪskiː/
Asterope	21 Tauri A	Taurus	Greek	Member of the Pleiades open star cluster (M45). Asterope was one of the Pleiades sisters in Greek mythology.	/(ə)ˈstɛrəpiː/
Asuusiha	τ Herculis	Hercules	Manchu	From the Manchu constellation Asu Usiha (ᠠᠰᡠ ᡠᠰᡳᡥᠠ), a net used to hunt sables.	
Atakoraka	WASP-64	Canis Major	Togolese	NameExoWorlds 2019; Togolese proposal; means 'the chain of the Atacora', a mountain range.	//
Athebyne	η Draconis A	Draco	Arabic		/'æθᵻbaɪn/
Atik	ο Persei A	Perseus	Arabic		/ˈeɪtɪk/
Atlas	27 Tauri Aa1	Taurus	Greek	Member of the Pleiades open star cluster (M45). Atlas was the Titan of endurance and astronomy and the father of the Pleiades sisters in Greek mythology.	/ˈætləs/
Atria	α Trianguli Australis	Triangulum Australe	Latin	Contraction of the Bayer designation Alpha Trianguli Australis.	/ˈeɪtriə/
Aurwandilsta	ι Coronae Borealis A	Corona Borealis	Norse	From the old Norse constellation "Aurvandill's Toe", identified with Corona Borealis.	
Avior	ε Carinae A	Carina	Latin	Designated "Avior" by His Majesty's Nautical Almanac Office for the Royal Air Force in the 1930s.	/ˈeɪviər/
Axólotl	HD 224693	Cetus	Nahuatl	NameExoWorlds 2019; Mexican proposal. An axolotl is a culturally significant amphibian; the name means 'water animal' in the Nahuatl language.	//
Ayeyarwady	HD 18742	Eridanus	Burmese	NameExoWorlds 2019; Myanmar proposal; named after the Irrawaddy River.	//
Azelfafage	π^{1} Cygni	Cygnus	Arabic	Variously reported as from Arabic: السلحفاة as-sulaḥfāh ('turtle'), الطلف الفرس aṭ-ṭilf al-faras ('horse track'), or عزل الدجاجة ʿazal ad-dajāja ('tail of the hen').	/əˈzɛlfəfeɪdʒ/
Azha	η Eridani	Eridanus	Arabic	Originally from Arabic: أدحي (النعام) ʾudḥiyy (an-naʿām) ('nest' [of the ostrich]); later miscopied as أزحى ʾazḥá in medieval manuscripts.	/ˈeɪzə/
Azmidi	ξ Puppis	Puppis	Greek	Alternatively rendered Asmidiske.	/ˈæzmᵻdi/
Bade	μ Leporis	Lepus	Balinese	From a Balinese constellation of a Ngaben funeral tower, corresponding to Lepus.	
Baekdu	8 Ursae Minoris	Ursa Minor	Korean	NameExoWorlds 2019; South Korean proposal; named after the highest mountain on the Korean peninsula.	/ˈbɛkduː/
Bagu	δ Aurigae A	Auriga	Chinese	From the Chinese constellation Bā Gǔ (Eight Kinds of Crops, 八穀).	
Baijiu	ι Piscis Austrini	Piscis Austrinus	Chinese	From the Chinese asterism Bài Jiù (Broken Mortar, 敗臼).	
Bajamar Star	2MASS J20555125+4352246	Cygnus	Spanish	Named after the Bahamas (Islas de Bajamar), in reference to its position near the North America Nebula.	
Bake-eo	γ Ophiuchi	Ophiuchus	Marshallese	Traditional Marshallese name, referring to the Spondylus mussel. Pronounced "bakey-yew"; also written Bake Eo.	
Baltesha	γ Coronae Borealis A	Corona Borealis	Sumerian	From the ancient Sumerian constellation ^{(MUL.)}BAL.TEŠ_{2}.A, the Asterism of Dignity.	
Barnard's Star	V2500 Ophiuchi	Ophiuchus	eponymous	Named after the American astronomer Edward Emerson Barnard, the first to measure its high proper motion.	/ˈbɑːrnərdz/
Baten Kaitos	ζ Ceti Aa	Cetus	Arabic	From Arabic: بطن قيطس batn qaytus ('belly of the sea monster').	/ˈbeɪtən ˈkeɪtɒs/
Batsũ̀	LHS 3844	Indus	Bribri	NameExoWorlds 2022; Costa Rican proposal; Bribri word for hummingbird.	
Bawy	ξ^{1} Ceti	Cetus	Egyptian	From the ancient Egyptian decan Bawy, the Two Souls.	
Beehive Proplyd	HH 540	Orion	English	A proplyd resembling a beehive.	
Beemim	υ^{3} Eridani	Eridanus	Hebrew		/ˈbiːməm/
Beid	ο^{1} Eridani	Eridanus	Arabic	The name is originally from Arabic: البيض al-bayḍ ('the eggs').	/ˈbaɪd/
Belel	HD 181342	Sagittarius	Senegalese	NameExoWorlds 2019; Senegalese proposal; a rare source of water in the North.	//
Bélénos	HD 8574	Pisces	French	NameExoWorlds 2019; French proposal; named after Belenus, a god of light, the Sun and of health in Gaulish mythology.	//
Bellatrix	γ Orionis	Orion	Latin	Latin for 'female warrior'; applied to this star in the 15th century.	/bɛˈleɪtrɪks/
Berehynia	HAT-P-15	Perseus	Ukrainian	NameExoWorlds 2019; Ukrainian proposal. A deity of waters and riverbanks in Slavic religion; now a national goddess – "hearth mother, protectress of the earth".	//
Betelgeuse	α Orionis A	Orion	Arabic	Derived from Arabic: يد الجوزاء yad al-jawzāʾ ('the hand of Jawzā', a female figure seen in Orion).	/ˈbɛtəldʒuːz, ˈbiːtəl-, -dʒuːs/
Bharani	41 Arietis Aa	Aries	Indic	Bharani (भरणी), the 2nd nakshatra in Indian astronomy, consisting of three stars of which this is the brightest.	/ˈbærəni/
Bibhā	HD 86081	Sextans	Indic	NameExoWorlds 2019; Indian proposal; Bengali pronunciation of Sanskrit Vibha, meaning 'a bright beam of light'.	//
Bibing	λ Tauri Aa	Taurus	Chinese	From the Chinese star name Bibing (畢柄), the handle of the Net.	
Bie	θ Coronae Australis	Corona Australis	Chinese	From the Chinese asterism Biē (鳖, River Turtle).	
Biham	θ Pegasi A	Pegasus	Arabic		/ˈbaɪ.æm/
Blaze Star	T Coronae Borealis	Corona Borealis	English	"Blaze Star" has been used as a nickname for this recurrent nova since 1866.	
Bodu	95 Herculis A	Hercules	Chinese	From the Chinese asterism Bó Dù (帛度, "Textile Ruler").	
Bosona	HD 206610	Aquarius	Bosnian	NameExoWorlds 2019; Bosnia and Herzegovina proposal; name of the territory of Bosnia in the 10th century.	//
Botein	δ Arietis	Aries	Arabic		/ˈboʊtiːn/
Brachium	σ Librae A	Libra	Latin		/ˈbreɪkiəm/
Bubup	HD 38283	Mensa	Boonwurrung	NameExoWorlds 2019; Australian proposal; means 'child' in the Boonwurrung language.	//
Buna	HD 16175	Andromeda	Ethiopian	NameExoWorlds 2019; Ethiopian proposal; a commonly used word for coffee.	//
Bunda	ξ Aquarii A	Aquarius	Arabic		/ˈbʌndə/
Buranun	88 Piscium	Pisces	Sumerian	The Sumerian name for the river Euphrates, represented by an ancient constellation in this area.	
Butterfly Star	IRAS 04302+2247	Taurus	English	This star is surrounded by a protoplanetary disk that resembles a butterfly's wings.	
Calvera	PSR J1412+7922	Ursa Minor	fictional	Named after the villain in the 1960 film The Magnificent Seven, as it was the eighth discovered isolated neutron star, the previously known ones being nicknamed 'The Magnificent Seven'.	
Canopus	α Carinae A	Carina	Greek	Ptolemy's Κάνωβος, after Canopus (Kanōpos, Kanōbos), a pilot from Greek mythology, whose name is itself of uncertain etymology.	/kəˈnoʊpəs/
Capella	α Aurigae Aa	Auriga	Latin	The traditional name Capella ('small female goat') is from Latin, and is a diminutive of capra ('female goat').	/kəˈpɛlə/
Caph	β Cassiopeiae	Cassiopeia	Arabic	The name is originally Arabic: كف kaff ('palm'), a residue of an old name of Cassiopeia, الكف الخصيب al-kaff al-ẖaḍīb ('the stained hand'); also known as السنام الناقة as-sanām al-nāqa ('the camel's hump').	/ˈkæf/
Castor	α Geminorum Aa	Gemini	Greek		/ˈkæstər/
Castula	υ^{2} Cassiopeiae	Cassiopeia	Latin		/ˈkæstjʊlə/
Cebalrai	β Ophiuchi	Ophiuchus	Arabic		/ˌsɛbəlˈreɪ.iː/
Ceibo	HD 63454	Chamaeleon	Uruguayan	NameExoWorlds 2019; Uruguayan proposal; named after Erythrina crista-galli (the native tree that gives rise to the national flower).	//
Celaeno	16 Tauri	Taurus	Greek	Member of the Pleiades open star cluster (M45). Celaeno was one of the Pleiades sisters in Greek mythology.	/sᵻˈliːnoʊ/
Cervantes	μ Arae	Ara	Spanish	NameExoWorlds 2015; Named after Miguel de Cervantes Saavedra, the Spanish author of El Ingenioso Hidalgo Don Quixote de la Mancha (Don Quixote).	/sɜːrˈvæntiːz/
Cexing	κ Cassiopeiae	Cassiopeia	Chinese	From the Chinese star name Cè (Whip, 策), plus xing meaning star.	
Chalawan	47 Ursae Majoris	Ursa Major	Thai	NameExoWorlds 2015; Named after Chalawan, a mythological crocodile king from a Thai folktale.	
Chamukuy	θ^{2} Tauri Aa	Taurus	Mayan		/ˈtʃɑːmuːkuːi/
Chaophraya	WASP-50	Eridanus	Thai	NameExoWorlds 2019; Thai proposal; named after the Chao Phraya River.	/tʃaʊˈpraɪə/
Chara	β Canum Venaticorum	Canes Venatici	Greek		/ˈkɛərə/
Chasoň	HAT-P-5	Lyra	Slovak	NameExoWorlds 2019; Slovak proposal; an ancient Slovak term for the Sun.	//
Chechia	HD 192699	Aquila	Tunisian	NameExoWorlds 2019; Tunisian proposal; a taqiyah (traditional hat) and national headdress.	//
Chertan	θ Leonis	Leo	Arabic	Alternative traditional name Chort.	
Chugao	ρ Ceti	Cetus	Chinese	From the Chinese asterism Chú Gǎo (蒭藁, Hay).	
Citadelle	HD 1502	Pisces	Haitian	NameExoWorlds 2019; Haitian proposal; named after Citadelle Laferrière, a mountaintop fortress and UNESCO World Heritage Site.	//
Citalá	HD 52265	Monoceros	Nawat	NameExoWorlds 2019; El Salvadorian proposal; means 'river of stars' in the Nawat language.	//
Cocibolca	HD 4208	Sculptor	Nicaragua	NameExoWorlds 2019; Nicaraguan proposal; named after Lake Nicaragua.	//
Copernicus	55 Cancri A	Cancer	Polish	NameExoWorlds 2015; In honor of the astronomer Nicolaus Copernicus.	//
Cor Caroli	α^{2} Canum Venaticorum Aa	Canes Venatici	Latin	Named after Charles I of England by Sir Charles Scarborough.	/ˌkɔːr ˈkærəlaɪ/
Cujam	ω Herculis A	Hercules	Latin	Traditional name, variously spelled Kajam. Originally from Latin Caia 'to club'.	/ˈkjuːdʒəm/
Cursa	β Eridani	Eridanus	Arabic	The name is originally from Arabic: الكرسي al-kursiyy ('the chair, footstool').	/ˈkɜːrsə/
Custos	BE Camelopardalis	Camelopardalis	Latin	From the historical constellation Custos Messium.	
Dabih	β^{1} Capricorni Aa	Capricornus	Arabic		/ˈdeɪbiː/
Dajiangjunbei	φ Persei A	Perseus	Chinese	From the Chinese constellation Dajiangjun (天大将军, "Celestial Grand General"); the northern star (bei).	
Dalim	α Fornacis A	Fornax	Arabic		/ˈdeɪlᵻm/
Danfeng	L 168-9	Tucana	Chinese	NameExoWorlds 2022; Chinese proposal; named after the red phoenix simplified Chinese: 丹凤; traditional Chinese: 丹鳳; pinyin: dānfèng, a bird from Chinese mythology.	
Darlugal	ζ Leporis	Lepus	Sumerian	From the ancient Sumerian constellation DAR.LUGAL, the Rooster, corresponding to Lepus.	
Deltoton	δ Trianguli A	Triangulum	Greek	From an ancient Greek name for Triangulum (Δελτωτόν; the letter Delta: Δ).	
Deneb	α Cygni	Cygnus	Arabic	The name is originally from Arabic: ذنب الدجاجة ḏanab ad-dajāja ('tail of the hen').	/ˈdɛnɛb/
Deneb Algedi	δ Capricorni Aa	Capricornus	Arabic		/ˌdɛnɛb ælˈdʒiːdiː/
Denebola	β Leonis	Leo	Arabic		/dəˈnɛbələ/
Dhanishta	γ^{1} Delphini	Delphinus	Indic	Dhaniṣṭhā (धनिष्ठा), the 23rd nakshatra in Indian astronomy.	
Dhanuśarāgra	W Sagittarii Aa1	Sagittarius	Indic	Dhanuśarāgra (धनुशराग्र), the Arrow, an Indian star name used since the 14th century.	
Diadem	α Comae Berenices A	Coma Berenices	Latin		/ˈdaɪədɛm/
Dilmun	WASP-121	Puppis	Sumerian	NameExoWorlds 2022; Bahraini proposal; named after the ancient civilization of the same name.	
Dingolay	HD 96063	Leo	Trinidadian	NameExoWorlds 2019; Trinidad and Tobago proposal; means 'to dance, twist and turn', symbolising the national ancestral culture and language.	//
Diphda	β Ceti	Cetus	Arabic	Arabic for 'frog', from the phrase ضفدع الثاني aḍ-ḍifdaʿ aṯ-ṯānī 'the second frog' (the 'first frog' is Fomalhaut)	/ˈdɪfdə/
Dìwö	WASP-17	Scorpius	Bribri	NameExoWorlds 2019; Costa Rican proposal; means 'the Sun' in the Bribri language.	//
Diya	WASP-72	Fornax	Indic	NameExoWorlds 2019; Mauritian proposal; named after an oil lamp used on special occasions, including Diwali.	//
Dofida	HD 117618	Centaurus	Nias	NameExoWorlds 2019; Indonesian proposal; means 'our star' in the Nias language.	//
Dombay	HAT-P-3	Ursa Major	Russian	NameExoWorlds 2019; Russian proposal; named after the Dombay resort region in the North Caucasus.	//
Dschubba	δ Scorpii A	Scorpius	Arabic		/ˈdʒʌbə/
Dubhe	α Ursae Majoris A	Ursa Major	Arabic	Member of the Big Dipper or the Plough (UK).	/ˈdʌbiː/
Dust-Ball	V927 Persei	Perseus	English	This star is embedded in a dusty nebula.	
Dziban	ψ^{1} Draconis A	Draco	Arabic	From the traditional name of Dziban or Dsiban, derived from Arabic: الذئبانِ aḏ-ḏiʾbān ('the two wolves' or 'the two jackals').	/ˈzaɪbən/
Ebla	HD 218566	Pisces	Sumerian	NameExoWorlds 2019; Syrian proposal; named after Ebla, an early kingdom in Syria.	//
Edasich	ι Draconis	Draco	Arabic	Common name reviewed and adopted by the Working Group on Star Names.	/ˈɛdəsɪk/
Electra	17 Tauri	Taurus	Greek	Member of the Pleiades open star cluster (M45). Electra was one of the Pleiades sisters in Greek mythology.	/ᵻˈlɛktrə/
Elgafar	φ Virginis A	Virgo	Arabic		/ˈɛlɡəfɑːr/
Elkurud	θ Columbae	Columba	Arabic		/ˈɛlkərʌd/
Elnath	β Tauri Aa	Taurus	Arabic	Variously El Nath or Alnath, from Arabic: النطح an-naṭḥ ('the butting') (i.e. "the bull's horns").	/ɛlˈnæθ/
Eltanin	γ Draconis	Draco	Arabic	Alternative traditional name of Etamin; both originally from the Arabic constellation name التنين at-tinnīn ('the great serpent'). γ Dra was also one of the "Five Camels" (Latin: Quinque Dromedarii), in Arabic العوائد al‑ʿawāʾid.	/ɛlˈteɪnᵻn/
Emiw	HD 7199	Tucana	Makhuwa	NameExoWorlds 2019; Mozambique proposal; represents love in the Makhuwa language.	//
Enduri Senggu	τ Cygni A	Cygnus	Manchu	From the Manchu constellation Enduri Senggu, a hedgehog goddess.	
Enif	ε Pegasi	Pegasus	Arabic		/ˈiːnɪf/
Errai	γ Cephei A	Cepheus	Arabic	NameExoWorlds 2015	/ɛˈreɪ.iː/
Fafnir	42 Draconis	Draco	Norse	NameExoWorlds 2015; Named after a Norse mythological dwarf who turned into a dragon.	//
Fang	π Scorpii Aa	Scorpius	Chinese	From the Chinese name 房 Fáng ('the room').	/ˈfæŋ/
Fawaris	δ Cygni A	Cygnus	Arabic		/fəˈwɛərᵻs/
Felis	HD 85951	Hydra	Latin	From the historical constellation Felis.	/ˈfiːlᵻs/
Felixvarela	BD−17 63	Cetus	Cuban	NameExoWorlds 2019; Cuban proposal; named after Félix Varela, a noted science teacher.	//
Fenmu	η Aquarii	Aquarius	Chinese	From the Chinese constellation Fén Mù (Tomb, 墳墓).	
Filetdor	WASP-166	Hydra	Spanish	NameExoWorlds 2022; Spanish proposal; named after a golden sea serpent, the protagonist of a Mallorcan folktale.	
Flegetonte	HD 102195	Virgo	Italian	NameExoWorlds 2019; Italian proposal. Named after Phlegethon, an underworld river of fire in Greek mythology in the poem Divina Commedia (The Divine Comedy) by Dante Alighieri.	//
Flying Saucer	2MASS J16281370-2431391	Ophiuchus	English	This star is surrounded by a protoplanetary disk that resembles a flying saucer.	
Fomalhaut	α Piscis Austrini A	Piscis Austrinus	Arabic	NameExoWorlds 2015; The name is originally from Arabic: فم الحوت fum al-ḥawt ('mouth of the fish'). In Persian astrology, this star was called "Haftorang, Watcher of the South", one of the royal stars.	/ˈfoʊməl.hɔːt/
Formosa	HD 100655	Leo	Chinese	NameExoWorlds 2019; Chinese Taipei proposal; Latin: Formosa ('beautiful') is a historical name for Taiwan.	/fɔːrˈmoʊsə/
Franz	HAT-P-14	Hercules	Austrian	NameExoWorlds 2019; Austrian proposal; named after Franz Joseph I of Austria.	//
Frosty Leo	IRAS 09371+1212	Leo	English	A star with an unusual spectrum, indicating water ice in its surrounding nebula.	
Fulu	ζ Cassiopeiae	Cassiopeia	Chinese	From the Chinese name 附路 Fùlù ('the auxiliary road').	/ˈfuːluː/
Fumalsamakah	β Piscium	Pisces	Arabic		/ˌfʌməlˈsæməkə/
Funi	HD 109246	Draco	Icelandic	NameExoWorlds 2019; Icelandic proposal; an Old Icelandic word meaning 'fire' or 'blaze'.	//
Furud	ζ Canis Majoris A	Canis Major	Arabic		/ˈfjʊərəd/
Fuyue	G Scorpii	Scorpius	Chinese	From the Chinese name Fu Yue.	/ˈfuːjuːeɪ/
Gacrux	γ Crucis	Crux	American	The name "Gacrux" is a modern contraction of the Bayer designation.	/ˈɡækrʌks/
Gaja	τ Tauri Aa	Taurus	Balinese	From a Balinese constellation of an elephant, corresponding to Taurus.	
Gajahmina	η Ceti	Cetus	Balinese	From a Balinese constellation of an elephant-fish, corresponding to Cetus.	
Gakyid	HD 73534	Cancer	Bhutanese	NameExoWorlds 2019; Bhutan proposal; means happiness.	//
Gang	50 Cassiopeiae	Cassiopeia	Chinese	From the Chinese asterism Gàng ("Shaft", 槓).	
Gar	GJ 486	Virgo	Basque	NameExoWorlds 2022; Spanish proposal; Basque word for flame.	//
Garnet Star	μ Cephei	Cepheus	English	Its colour was described as "garnet" by William Herschel. Following Herschel, it was called garnet sidus by Giuseppe Piazzi.	//
Geminga	PSR B0633+17	Gemini	Lombard	both a contraction of Gemini gamma-ray source, and a transcription of the words ghè minga (pronounced [ɡɛ ˈmĩːɡa]), meaning "it's not there" in the Milanese dialect of Lombard.	/ɡəˈmɪŋɡə/
Genghe	σ Boötis	Boötes	Chinese	From the Chinese asterism Gěnghé (Celestial Lance, 梗河).	
Giausar	λ Draconis	Draco	Persian	Traditional name, variously spelled Gianfar.	/ˈdʒɔːzɑːr/
Gienah	γ Corvi A	Corvus	Arabic	Also known as Gienah Gurab; the star ε Cygni (Aljanah) was also traditionally known as Gienah.	/ˈdʒiːnə/
Ginan	ε Crucis	Crux	Wardaman	Traditional name in the culture of the Wardaman people of the Northern Territory of Australia.	/ˈɡiːnən/
Gloas	WASP-13	Lynx	Gaelic	NameExoWorlds 2019; British proposal; means 'to shine (like a star)' in the Manx Gaelic language.	//
Gnomon	WASP-43	Sextans	Romance	NameExoWorlds 2022; Romanian proposal; named after the gnomon.	
Gomeisa	β Canis Minoris A	Canis Minor	Arabic		/ɡɒˈmaɪzə/
Gouguo	62 Sagittarii	Sagittarius	Chinese	From the Chinese asterism Gŏu Guó (狗国, Territory of Dog).	
Graffias†	ξ Scorpii	Scorpius	Greek	Possibly from Greek Γραψαῖος "crab"; also once applied to β Scorpii.	/ˈɡræfiəs/
Grumium	ξ Draconis A	Draco	Greek-Latin		/ˈɡruːmiəm/
Guahayona	HAT-P-26	Virgo	Taíno	NameExoWorlds 2022; Puerto Rican proposal; named after a trickster from Taíno mythology.	
Guansuo	θ Coronae Borealis A	Corona Borealis	Chinese	From the Chinese constellation Guàn Suǒ (Coiled Thong, 贯索).	
Gudja	κ Serpentis	Serpens	Wardaman		/ˈɡuːdʒə/
Gumala	HD 179949	Sagittarius	Malay	NameExoWorlds 2019; Brunei proposal; a Malay language word referring to a magical stone found in snakes or dragons.	//
Guniibuu	36 Ophiuchi A	Ophiuchus	Kamilaroi	Traditional name from the Kamilaroi and Euahlayi people of Australia, referring to the scarlet robin.	/ɡəˈniːbuː/
Guqi	δ Aquilae A	Aquila	Chinese	From the Chinese asterism Gŭ Qí (Drum Flag, 鼓旗).	
Hadar	β Centauri Aa	Centaurus	Arabic		/ˈheɪdɑːr/
Haedus	η Aurigae	Auriga	Latin		/ˈhiːdəs/
Hamal	α Arietis	Aries	Arabic	Traditional name (also written Hemal, Hamul, or Ras Hammel) derived from Arabic: رأس الحمل raʾs al-ḥamal ('head of the ram'), in turn from the name for the constellation as a whole, al-ḥamal ('the ram').	/ˈhæməl/
Hassaleh	ι Aurigae	Auriga	unknown	Name originating in Antonín Bečvář's 1948 star atlas, Atlas Coeli Skalnaté Pleso.	/ˈhæsəleɪ/
Hatysa	ι Orionis Aa	Orion	unknown	Name originating in Antonín Bečvář's 1948 star atlas, Atlas Coeli Skalnaté Pleso.	/hɑːˈtiːsə/)
Helvetios	51 Pegasi	Pegasus	Latin	NameExoWorlds 2015; Latin for 'the Helvetian' and refers to the Celtic tribe that lived in Switzerland during antiquity.	/hɛlˈviːtiəs/
Heng	ν Centauri A	Centaurus	Chinese	From a Chinese constellation.	
Heryibwia	η Sagittarii A	Sagittarius	Egyptian	From the ancient Egyptian star name Hery-ib-Wia, the star in the middle of the boat, within the constellation Wia.	
Heze	ζ Virginis A	Virgo	unknown	Name originating in Antonín Bečvář's 1948 star atlas, Atlas Coeli Skalnaté Pleso.	/ˈhiːziː/
Hoerikwaggo	α Mensae A	Mensa	Afrikaans	From the Afrikaans form of Khoekhoe Huriǂoaxa, referring to Table Mountain which its constellation represents.	
Hoggar	HD 28678	Taurus	Algerian	NameExoWorlds 2019; Algerian proposal; named after the Hoggar Mountains.	//
Holoea	IRAS 05327+3404	Auriga	Hawaiian	The name is Hawaiian for "flowing gas", given to a young stellar object that was discovered from Hawaii.	
Homam	ζ Pegasi	Pegasus	Arabic		/ˈhoʊmæm/
Honores	7 Andromedae	Andromeda	Latin	From the historical constellation Honores Friderici.	
Horna	HAT-P-38	Triangulum	Finnish	NameExoWorlds 2019; Finnish proposal; the name of hell or the underworld in Finnic mythology.	//
Hru	σ Aquilae A	Aquila	Balinese	From a Balinese constellation of an arrow, corresponding to Aquila.	
Huagai	ι Cassiopeiae Aa	Cassiopeia	Chinese	From the Chinese asterism Huá Gài (Canopy of the Emperor, 華蓋).	
Hunahpú	HD 98219	Crater	Maya	NameExoWorlds 2019; Honduran proposal; one of the Maya Hero Twins who became the Sun in K'iche' Maya mythology.	//
Hunor	HAT-P-2	Hercules	Hungarian	NameExoWorlds 2019; Hungarian proposal; named after the Hunor, one of the legendary ancestors of the nation.	//
Hydor	2 Ceti	Cetus	Greek	From an ancient Greek constellation (Ὕδωρ, "water"); previously applied to λ Aquarii.	
Idigna	π Piscium A	Pisces	Sumerian	The Sumerian name for the river Tigris, represented by an ancient constellation in this area.	
Iklil	ρ Scorpii Aa	Scorpius	Arabic		/ˈɪklɪl/
Illyrian	HD 82886	Leo Minor	Albanian	NameExoWorlds 2019; Albanian proposal; named after the Illyrians, the people from whom Albanians are descended and what they call themselves.	/ᵻˈlɪriən/
Imai	δ Crucis	Crux	Mursi	Traditional Mursi name, after the imai grass that grows along the banks of the Omo River.	/ˈiːmaɪ/
Inquill	HD 156411	Ara	Peruvian	NameExoWorlds 2019; Peruvian proposal; a character in the story Way to the Sun by Abraham Valdelomar.	//
Intan	HD 20868	Fornax	Malay	NameExoWorlds 2019; Malaysian proposal; means 'diamond' in the Malay language.	/intan/
Intercrus	41 Lyncis	Ursa Major	Latin	NameExoWorlds 2015; Intercrus means 'between the legs' in Latin, referring to the star's position in the constellation Ursa Major.	/ˈɪntərkrʌs/
Irena	WASP-38	Hercules	Slovenian	NameExoWorlds 2019; Slovenian proposal; a character in the novel Under the Free Sun by Fran Saleški Finžgar.	//
Itonda	HD 208487	Grus	Myene	NameExoWorlds 2019; Gabonese proposal; means 'all that is beautiful' in the Myene language.	//
Izar	ε Boötis A	Boötes	Arabic	Originally from Arabic: إزار ʾizār ('veil') In the Calendarium of Al Achsasi Al Mouakket, it is designated منطقة ألعوع minṭaqat al‑ʿawwaʿ, translated into Latin as Cingulum Latratoris ('belt of barker').	/ˈaɪzɑːr/
Jabbah	ν Scorpii Aa	Scorpius	Arabic		/ˈdʒæbə/
Jian	ξ^{2} Sagittarii	Sagittarius	Chinese	From the Chinese constellation Jiàn (建), meaning to set up or erect.	
Jiantai	δ^{2} Lyrae	Lyra	Chinese	From the Chinese constellation Jiàn Tái (Clepsydra Terrace, 渐台).	
Jishui	ο Geminorum	Gemini	Chinese		//
Jiu	ι Pegasi Aa	Pegasus	Chinese	From the Chinese asterism Jiù (Mortar, 臼).	
Jordanus	25 Canum Venaticorum A	Canes Venatici	Latin	From the historical constellation Jordanus.	
Junnanmen	φ Andromedae A	Andromeda	Chinese	From the Chinese star name Jūn Nán Mén (军南门, "Southern Military Gate").	
Kaewkosin	GJ 3470	Cancer	Thai	NameExoWorlds 2022; Thai proposal; named after the crystals of the Hindu deity of Indra in the Thai language.	
Kaffaljidhma	γ Ceti A	Cetus	Arabic		/ˌkæfəlˈdʒɪdmə/
Kaffalmusalsala	κ Andromedae	Andromeda	Arabic	From Arabic كفّ المسلسة, "Hand of the Chained Woman [Andromeda]", originally an asterism of three stars.	
Kalasungsang	ρ Boötis	Boötes	Balinese	From a Balinese constellation of an upside-down demon, corresponding to Boötes.	
Kalausi	HD 83443	Vela	Dholuo	NameExoWorlds 2019; Kenyan proposal; means a very strong whirling column of wind in the Dholuo language.	//
Kamelos	HD 45866	Camelopardalis	Greek	From the Greek for camel, a pun on its constellation Camelopardalis (literally "spotted camel", representing a giraffe).	
Kamuy	HD 145457	Corona Borealis	Ainu	NameExoWorlds 2019; Japanese proposal; a word denoting Kamuy, a supernatural entity in the Ainu language.	//
Kang	κ Virginis	Virgo	Chinese	From the Chinese name 亢 Kàng ('the neck').	/ˈkæŋ/
Kapteyn's Star†	VZ Pictoris	Pictor	eponymous	Named after the Dutch astronomer Jacobus Kapteyn.	
Karaka	HD 137388	Apus	Maori	NameExoWorlds 2019; New Zealand proposal; word for a local plant that produces orange fruit in the Māori language.	//
Kaus Australis	ε Sagittarii A	Sagittarius	Arab-Latin	Part of the Teapot asterism.	/ˈkɔːs ɔːˈstreɪlᵻs/
Kaus Borealis	λ Sagittarii	Sagittarius	Arab-Latin	The top of the Teapot asterism.	/ˈkɔːs bɒriˈælᵻs/
Kaus Media	δ Sagittarii A	Sagittarius	Arab-Latin	Part of the Teapot asterism.	/ˌkɔːs ˈmiːdiə/
Kautoki	ζ^{1} Lyrae A	Lyra	Polynesian	From the Kapingamarangi asterism Kautoki, the adze handle.	
Kaveh	HD 175541	Serpens	Persian	NameExoWorlds 2019; Iranian proposal; named after Kāve, a hero of the epic poem Shahnameh composed by Ferdowsi.	//
Keid	ο^{2} Eridani A	Eridanus	Arabic		/ˈkaɪd/
Kenemu	ρ^{1} Sagittarii	Sagittarius	Egyptian	From the ancient Egyptian decan Kenemu.	
Khambalia	λ Virginis A	Virgo	Coptic		/kæmˈbeɪliə/
Khepdenreret	ε Herculis Aa	Hercules	Egyptian	Ancient Egyptian star name within the constellation Reret, a hippopotamus goddess.	
Kitalpha	α Equulei A	Equuleus	Arabic		/kᵻˈtælfə/
Kochab	β Ursae Minoris	Ursa Minor	Arabic		/ˈkoʊkæb/
Koeia	HIP 12961	Eridanus	Taíno	NameExoWorlds 2019; Puerto Rican proposal; means 'star' in the Taíno language.	//
Koit	XO-4	Lynx	Estonian	NameExoWorlds 2019; Estonian proposal; means 'dawn' in the Estonian language.	//
Komondor	HAT-P-12	Canes Venatici	Hungarian	NameExoWorlds 2022; Hungarian proposal; after the dog breed of the same name.	
Kornephoros	β Herculis Aa	Hercules	Greek		/kɔːrˈnɛfərəs/
Kosjenka	WASP-63	Columba	Croatian	NameExoWorlds 2022; Croatian proposal; after a character from Croatian Tales of Long Ago.	
Kraz	β Corvi	Corvus	unknown	Name originating in Antonín Bečvář's 1948 star atlas, Atlas Coeli Skalnaté Pleso.	/ˈkræz/
Krios	HD 240429	Cassiopeia	Greek	Named after Krios, a Titan in Greek mythology.	
Kronos	HD 240430	Cassiopeia	Greek	Named after Kronos, a Titan in Greek mythology.	
Kuda	δ Andromedae	Andromeda	Balinese	From a Balinese constellation of a horse, corresponding to Pegasus and parts of Andromeda.	
Kui	η Andromedae A	Andromeda	Chinese	From the Chinese constellation Kui (奎), the Legs.	
Kulou	ι Centauri	Centaurus	Chinese	From the Chinese constellation Kulou (库楼), the Arsenal.	
Kurhah	ξ Cephei Aa	Cepheus	Arabic		/ˈkɜːr.hə/
La Superba	Y Canum Venaticorum	Canes Venatici	Italian	A modern (19th century) name, due to Angelo Secchi.	/ˌlɑːsuːˈpɜːrbə/
Lang-Exster	α Tucanae	Tucana	Dutch-Malay	Lang is a Malay/Indonesian word meaning hornbill, Exster a Dutch word meaning magpie; both were historically used in association with Tucana. Double name, given to the two components of a binary star system.	
Larawag	ε Scorpii	Scorpius	Wardaman	Traditional name in the culture of the Wardaman people of the Northern Territory of Australia.	/ˈlærəwæɡ/
Leepwal	ζ Centauri A	Centaurus	Marshallese	Traditional Marshallese name (Ļeepwal), pronounced "leyepwal".	
Leidian	ρ Pegasi A	Pegasus	Chinese	From the Chinese constellation Léi Diàn (Thunder and Lightning, 雷電).	
Lembu	97 Tauri	Taurus	Balinese	From a Balinese constellation of an ox, corresponding to Taurus.	
Lerna	HAT-P-42	Hydra	Greek	NameExoWorlds 2019; Greek proposal; named after Lerna, the lake where the mythical Hydra lived.	/ˈlɜːrnə/
Lesath	υ Scorpii	Scorpius	Arabic		/ˈliːsæθ/
Libertas	ξ Aquilae	Aquila	Latin	NameExoWorlds 2015; Latin for 'liberty' (Aquila is Latin for 'eagle', a popular symbol of liberty).	/ˈlɪbərtæs/
Lich	PSR B1257+12	Virgo	English	NameExoWorlds 2015; A neutron star and pulsar with planets. A lich is a fictional undead creature known for controlling other undead creatures with magic.	/ˈlɪtʃ/
Liesma	HD 118203	Ursa Major	Latvian	NameExoWorlds 2019; Latvian proposal; means 'fire' and is the name of a character in the poem Staburags un Liesma.	//
Ligong	λ Pegasi	Pegasus	Chinese	From the Chinese constellation Ligong (離宮), a secondary palace.	
Lilii Borea	39 Arietis	Aries	Latin		/ˈlɪliaɪ ˈbɔərɪə/
Lintangkumba	τ^{2} Aquarii	Aquarius	Indonesian	From Indonesian lintang 'constellation' and Kumba (Sanskrit: कुम्भ, romanized: kumbha), the Indian and Indonesian name for Aquarius.	
Lionrock	HD 212771	Aquarius	English	NameExoWorlds 2019; Hong Kong proposal; named after Lion Rock, a culturally important lion-shaped peak.	/ˈlaɪənrɒk/
Lucilinburhuc	HD 45350	Auriga	Luxembourgish	NameExoWorlds 2019; Luxembourger proposal; named after the Fortress of Luxembourg built in 963 by Count Siegfried, the founder of Luxembourg.	//
Lumbung	CH Crucis	Crux	Balinese	From a Balinese constellation of a rice barn, corresponding to Crux.	
Lusitânia	HD 45652	Monoceros	Portuguese	NameExoWorlds 2019; Portuguese proposal; ancient name for Lusitania, the region where most of Portugal is situated.	//
Luyten's Star†	GJ 273	Canis Minor	eponymous	Named after the Dutch-American astronomer Willem Jacob Luyten.	
Maasym	λ Herculis	Hercules	Arabic		/ˈmeɪəsɪm/
Macondo	HD 93083	Antlia	Colombian	NameExoWorlds 2019; Colombian proposal; named after a mythical village from the novel Cien anos de soledad (One Hundred Years of Solitude) by Gabriel García Márquez.	//
Maenalus	109 Virginis	Virgo	Latin	From the historical constellation Mons Maenalus.	
Mago	HD 32518	Camelopardalis	Ethiopian	NameExoWorlds 2019; German proposal; named after Mago National Park, a national park in Ethiopia noted for its giraffes (Camelopardalis is Latin for 'giraffe').	//
Magur	HD 168592	Corona Australis	Sumerian	From the ancient Sumerian constellation MA_{2}.GUR_{8}, the Boat.	
Mahasim	θ Aurigae A	Auriga	Arabic		//
Mahsati	HD 152581	Ophiuchus	Azerbaijani	NameExoWorlds 2019; Azerbaijani proposal; named after the poet Mahsati Ganjavi.	//
Maia	20 Tauri	Taurus	Greek	Member of the Pleiades open star cluster (M45). Maia was one of the Pleiades sisters in Greek mythology.	/ˈmeɪ.ə, ˈmaɪ.ə/
Malmok	WASP-39	Virgo	Aruban	NameExoWorlds 2019; Aruban proposal; the indigenous name given to Palm Beach, a beach and popular snorkelling spot.	//
Marfik	λ Ophiuchi Aa	Ophiuchus	Arabic		/ˈmɑːrfɪk/
Markab	α Pegasi	Pegasus	Arabic		/ˈmɑːrkæb/
Markeb	κ Velorum A	Vela	Arabic		/ˈmɑːrkɛb/
Márohu	WASP-6	Aquarius	Taíno	NameExoWorlds 2019; Dominican Republic proposal; the god of drought and protector of the Sun.	//
Marsic	κ Herculis A	Hercules	Arabic		/ˈmɑːrsɪk/
Maru	WD 0806−661	Volans	Korean	NameExoWorlds 2022; South Korean proposal; Korean word meaning sky.	
Matar	η Pegasi Aa	Pegasus	Arabic		/ˈmeɪtɑːr/
Matrichakra	δ Coronae Borealis	Corona Borealis	Indic	From the Indian name for Corona Borealis, Mātṛcakra, The Circle (मातृचक्र).	
Matza	HIP 65426	Centaurus	Zoque	NameExoWorlds 2022; Mexican proposal; Zoque word for star.	
Mazaalai	HAT-P-21	Ursa Major	Mongolian	NameExoWorlds 2019; Mongolian proposal; a name given to the Gobi bear.	//
Mebsuta	ε Geminorum	Gemini	Arabic		/mɛbˈsuːtə/
Megrez	δ Ursae Majoris	Ursa Major	Arabic	Member of the Big Dipper or the Plough (UK).	/ˈmiːɡrɛz/
Meissa	λ Orionis A	Orion	Arabic	Traditional name deriving from Arabic: الميسان al-maysān ('the shining one').	/ˈmaɪsə/
Mekbuda	ζ Geminorum Aa	Gemini	Arabic		/mɛkˈbjuːdə/
Meleph	ε Cancri Aa	Cancer	Arabic		//
Menkalinan	β Aurigae Aa	Auriga	Arabic		/mɛŋˈkælᵻnæn/
Menkar	α Ceti	Cetus	Arabic	Derived from Arabic: منخر manẖar ('nostril'), or al‑minẖar ('nose' [of Cetus]).	/ˈmɛŋkɑːr/
Menkent	θ Centauri	Centaurus	Arab-Latin		/ˈmɛŋkɛnt/
Menkib	ξ Persei	Perseus	Arabic		/ˈmɛŋkᵻb/
Merak	β Ursae Majoris	Ursa Major	Arabic	Member of the Big Dipper or the Plough (UK).	/ˈmɪəræk/
Merga	38 Boötis	Boötes	Latin		/ˈmɜːrɡə/
Meridiana	α Coronae Australis	Corona Australis	Latin		/məˌrɪdiˈænə/
Merope	23 Tauri Aa	Taurus	Greek	Member of the Pleiades open star cluster (M45). Merope was one of the Pleiades sisters in Greek mythology.	/ˈmɛrəpi/
Mesarthim	γ^{1} Arietis A	Aries	Arabic		/mɛˈsɑːrθᵻm/
Miaplacidus	β Carinae	Carina	Arab-Latin		/ˌmaɪəˈplæsᵻdəs/
Mimosa	β Crucis	Crux	Latin	Also bore the alternative historical name "Becrux", a modern contraction of the Bayer designation.	/mᵻˈmoʊsə/
Minchir	σ Hydrae	Hydra	Arabic		/ˈmɪŋkər/
Minelauva	δ Virginis	Virgo	Arabic	Alternately spelled Minelava.	/ˌmɪnəˈlɔːvə/
Mintaka	δ Orionis Aa	Orion	Arabic	The right-most star in Orion's belt. The name Mintaka itself is derived from Arabic: منطقة manṭaqa ('belt').	/ˈmɪntəkə/
Mira	ο Ceti A	Cetus	Latin	Latin for 'wonderful' or 'astonishing'; named by Johannes Hevelius in his Historiola Mirae Stellae (1662).	/ˈmaɪərə/
Mirach	β Andromedae	Andromeda	Arabic		/ˈmaɪræk/
Miram	η Persei A	Perseus	unknown		/ˈmaɪræm, ˈmaɪərəm/
Mirfak	α Persei	Perseus	Arabic		/ˈmɜːrfæk/
Mirzam	β Canis Majoris	Canis Major	Arabic		/ˈmɜːrzəm/
Misam	κ Persei Aa	Perseus	Arabic		/ˈmaɪzəm/
Mizar	ζ Ursae Majoris Aa	Ursa Major	Arabic	Member of the Big Dipper or the Plough (UK). The name is originally from Arabic: المئزر al-miʾzar ('apron, waistband, girdle'). Also called 禄 Lù ('Status'), one of the "Three Stars" in Chinese mythology. The Lù star is believed to be Zhang Xian, who lived during the Later Shu dynasty. The word lù specifically refers to the salary of a government official. As such, the Lù star is the star of prosperity, rank, and influence.	/ˈmaɪzɑːr/
Moldoveanu	XO-1	Corona Borealis	Romanian	NameExoWorlds 2019; Romanian proposal; named after Moldoveanu Peak, the highest peak in Romania.	//
Mönch	HD 130322	Virgo	Swiss	NameExoWorlds 2019; Swiss proposal; named after Mönch, a prominent Alpine peak in Switzerland.	//
Montuno	WASP-79	Eridanus	Panamanian	NameExoWorlds 2019; Panamanian proposal; a traditional dancing costume.	//
Morava	WASP-60	Pegasus	Serbian	NameExoWorlds 2019; Serbian proposal; named after the Great Morava river system.	//
Moriah	HAT-P-23	Delphinus	Arabic	NameExoWorlds 2019; Palestinian proposal; ancient name for Temple Mount in Jerusalem.	/mɒˈraɪə/
Moth	HD 61005	Puppis	English	This star is surrounded by a debris disk that resembles a moth.	
Mothallah	α Trianguli A	Triangulum	Arabic		/məˈθælə/
Mouhoun	HD 30856	Eridanus	Burkinabè	NameExoWorlds 2019; Burkina Faso proposal; named after the Black Volta, the largest river.	//
Mpingo	WASP-71	Cetus	Tanzanian	NameExoWorlds 2019; Tanzanian proposal; named after Dalbergia melanoxylon, a tree whose ebony wood is used for musical instruments.	/ɛmˈpɪŋɡoʊ/
Muliphein	γ Canis Majoris	Canis Major	Arabic		/ˈmjuːlᵻfeɪn/
Muning	γ Serpentis Aa	Serpens	Wardaman	"Small rock cod"; a traditional Wardaman name for β & γ Serpentis.	
Muphrid	η Boötis Aa	Boötes	Arabic	Alternative traditional spelling of Mufrid.	/ˈmjuːfrᵻd/
Muscida	ο Ursae Majoris A	Ursa Major	Latin		/ˈmjuːsᵻdə/
Musica	18 Delphini	Delphinus	Greek	NameExoWorlds 2015; Latin for 'music' (the ancient Greek musician Arion's life was saved at sea by dolphins (delphinus) after attracting their attention by playing his kithara).	/ˈmjuːzᵻkə/
Muspelheim	HAT-P-29	Perseus	Norse	NameExoWorlds 2019; Danish proposal; named after the Norse mythological realm of fire Muspelheim.	//
Naga	γ Hydrae A	Hydra	Indic	From a Balinese constellation of a serpent or large snake corresponding to Hydra.	
Nahn	ξ Cancri A	Cancer	Arabic		/ˈnɑːn/
Naledi	WASP-62	Dorado	South African	NameExoWorlds 2019; South African proposal; means 'star' in the Sesotho, SeTswana and SePedi languages.	//
Nandou	φ Sagittarii A	Sagittarius	Chinese	From the Chinese constellation Nándŏu (Southern Dipper, 南斗), one of the lunar mansions.	
Naos	ζ Puppis	Puppis	Greek		/ˈneɪ.ɒs/
Nashira	γ Capricorni A	Capricornus	Arabic		/ˈnæʃɪrə/
Násti	HD 68988	Ursa Major	Uralic	NameExoWorlds 2019; Norwegian proposal; means 'star' in the Sámi language.	//
Natasha	HD 85390	Vela	Zambian	NameExoWorlds 2019; Zambian proposal; means 'thank you' in many national languages.	//
Necklace	IRAS 19417+1701	Sagitta	English	Central star of a planetary nebula with a knotted ring structure, resembling a necklace.	
Neichu	π^{2} Pegasi	Pegasus	Chinese	From the Chinese asterism Nèichŭ (Inner Pestle, 內杵).	
Nekkar	β Boötis	Boötes	Arabic		/ˈnɛkɑːr/
Nembus	51 Andromedae	Andromeda	Latin		/ˈnɛmbəs/
Nenque	HD 6434	Phoenix	Waorani	NameExoWorlds 2019; Ecuadorian proposal; means 'the Sun' in the language of the Waorani tribes.	/ˈnɛŋkiː/
Nervia	HD 49674	Auriga	Celtic	NameExoWorlds 2019; Belgian proposal; adapted from Nervii, a Celtic tribe.	/ˈnɜːrviə/
Nganurganity	σ Canis Majoris	Canis Major	Wergaia	Traditional name from the Boorong people of northwestern Victoria, Australia, referring to the jacky lizard. Also historically written Unurgunite.	[ˈŋanuɾˌɡ̊aniɟ̊]
Niandao	R Lyrae	Lyra	Chinese	From the Chinese asterism Niăn Dào (Imperial Passageway, 辇道).	
Nihal	β Leporis A	Lepus	Arabic		/ˈnaɪ.æl/
Nikawiy	HD 136418	Boötes	Cree	NameExoWorlds 2019; Canadian proposal; means 'mother' in the Cree language.	//
Ninnisig	θ Lyrae	Lyra	Sumerian	An ancient Sumerian name, representing the goddess Ninnisig.	
Noquisi	GJ 436	Leo	Cherokee	NameExoWorlds 2022; United States proposal; Cherokee word for star.	//
Nosaxa	HD 48265	Puppis	Moqoit	NameExoWorlds 2019; Argentinian proposal; means 'spring' in the Moqoit language.	//
Nüchuang	π Herculis	Hercules	Chinese	From the Chinese constellation Nǚ Chuáng (Woman's Bed, 女床).	
Nunki	σ Sagittarii Aa	Sagittarius	Sumerian	Along with τ Sagittarii, it makes up the handle of the Teapot asterism.	/ˈnʌŋki/
Nusakan	β Coronae Borealis A	Corona Borealis	Arabic		/ˈnjuːsəkæn/
Nushagak	HD 17156	Cassiopeia	American	NameExoWorlds 2019; American proposal; named after the Nushagak River in Alaska.	/ˈnuːʃᵻɡæk/
Nyamien	WASP-15	Centaurus	Akan	NameExoWorlds 2019; Ivory Coast proposal; named after the supreme creator deity of Akan religion.	//
Ogma	HD 149026	Hercules	Celtic	NameExoWorlds 2015; Named after Ogma, a deity in Celtic mythology.	/ˈɒɡmə/
Okab	ζ Aquilae A	Aquila	Arabic		/ˈoʊkæb/
Orkaria	GJ 1214	Ophiuchus	Maasai	NameExoWorlds 2022; Kenyan proposal; Maa word for red ochre.	//
Pabilsang	ν^{2} Sagittarii A	Sagittarius	Sumerian	From the ancient Sumerian name of Sagittarius, Pabilsaĝ.	
Pagru	η Aquilae Aa	Aquila	Akkadian	From the Babylonian constellation "the Dead Man" recorded in MUL.APIN.	
Paikauhale	τ Scorpii	Scorpius	Hawaiian	Traditional Hawaiian name.	/ˌpaɪkaʊˈhɑːleɪ/
Paloma	2MASS J05243042+4244506	Auriga	Spanish	Named after the Spanish word for dove or pigeon, in reference to the shape of a nearby supernova remnant.	
Paradys	α Apodis	Apus	Dutch	From Paradys-vogel, a historical Dutch name of Apus.	
Parumleo	WASP-32	Pisces	Latin	NameExoWorlds 2019; Singaporean proposal; the name is Latin for 'little lion'.	/pærəmˈliːoʊ/
Paushna	ζ Piscium Ba	Pisces	Indic	Pauṣṇa (पौष्ण), another name for the 27th nakshatra Revati.	/ˈreɪvəti/
Peacock	α Pavonis A	Pavo	English	Designated "Peacock" (after the constellation) by His Majesty's Nautical Almanac Office for the Royal Air Force in the 1930s.	/ˈpiːkɒk/
Peony Star	WR 102ka	Sagittarius	English	Named after its surrounding nebula, which resembles a peony flower.	
Petra	WASP-80	Aquila	Jordanian	NameExoWorlds 2019; Jordanian proposal; Named after Petra, the archaeological city and UNESCO World Heritage Site.	/ˈpiːtrə/
Phact	α Columbae	Columba	Arabic		/ˈfækt/
Phecda	γ Ursae Majoris	Ursa Major	Arabic	A member of the Big Dipper or the Plough (UK). Alternative traditional names are Phekda or Phad.	/ˈfɛkdə/
Pherkad	γ Ursae Minoris	Ursa Minor	Arabic	From Arabic al-farqadan "the two calves" for β and γ Ursae Minoris.	/ˈfɜːrkæd/
Pherkad Minor	11 Ursae Minoris	Ursa Minor	Arabic	A fainter neighbor of Pherkad; the name originates with Piazzi.	
Phoenicia	HD 192263	Aquila	Phoenician	NameExoWorlds 2019; Lebanese proposal; named after Phoenicia, the ancient civilisation.	/fᵻˈnɪʃ(i)ə/
Phyllon Kissinou	23 Comae Berenices	Coma Berenices	Greek	From its description in the Almagest (φύλλοv κισσίνου, an ivy leaf).	
Piautos	λ Cancri A	Cancer	Coptic		/piˈɔːtɒs/
Pili	ω Piscium	Pisces	Chinese	From the Chinese constellation Pī Lì (Thunderbolt, 霹靂).	
Pincoya	HD 164604	Sagittarius	Chilean	NameExoWorlds 2019; Chilean proposal; named after Pincoya, a female water spirit from local mythology.	/pɪŋˈkɔɪə/
Ping	ε Leporis	Lepus	Chinese	From the Chinese asterism Ping (屏, representing a screen in front of a toilet.	
Pipirima	μ^{2} Scorpii A	Scorpius	Tahitian		/pᵻˈpɪrᵻmə/
Pipit	ν Puppis	Puppis	Kendayan	Traditional name from the Kendayan people of West Kalimantan province, Indonesia.	
Pipoltr	TrES-3	Hercules	German	NameExoWorlds 2019; Liechtenstein proposal; named after a bright and visible butterfly in the local dialect of Triesenberg.	//
Pistol Star	V4647 Sagittarii	Sagittarius	English	Named by its discoverers after the surrounding Pistol Nebula.	
Plaskett's Star†	V640 Monocerotis	Monoceros	eponymous	Named after the Canadian astronomer John Stanley Plaskett.	
Pleione	28 Tauri Aa	Taurus	Greek	Member of the Pleiades open star cluster (M45). Pleione was the mother of the Pleiades sisters in Greek mythology.	/ˈplaɪəniː, ˈpliːəniː/
Poerava	HD 221287	Tucana	Maori	NameExoWorlds 2019; Cook Islands proposal; means a large mystical black pearl in the Cook Islands Māori language.	//
Polaris	α Ursae Minoris Aa	Ursa Minor	Latin	Became known as stella polaris ('polar star') during the Renaissance. See polar star for other names based on its position close to the celestial pole.	/poʊˈlɛərᵻs/
Polaris Australis	σ Octantis	Octans	Latin	See South Star.	/poʊˈlɛərᵻs ɔːˈstreɪlᵻs/
Polis	μ Sagittarii Aa	Sagittarius	Greek		/ˈpɒlᵻs/
Pollux	β Geminorum	Gemini	Greek		/ˈpɒləks/
Pongaponga	ε^{1} Lyrae A	Lyra	Cook Islands	Traditional name from Pukapuka for the double star ε Lyrae, meaning "the nostrils of the rat".	
Porrima	γ Virginis A	Virgo	Latin		/ˈpɒrɪmə/
Praecipua	46 Leonis Minoris	Leo Minor	Latin		/prᵻˈsɪpjuə/
Prima Hyadum	γ Tauri A	Taurus	Latin		/ˌpraɪmə ˈhaɪədəm/
Procyon	α Canis Minoris A	Canis Minor	Greek	Ancient Greek: προκύον prokuon ('preceding the Dog') (viz. Sirius); Latinized as Antecanis.	/ˈproʊsiɒn/
Propus	η Geminorum A	Gemini	Greek		/ˈproʊpəs/
Protome	6 Equulei	Equuleus	Greek	Protome, the Bust, was the ancient Greek name of Equuleus.	
Proxima Centauri	α Centauri C	Centaurus	Latin	The nearest star to the Sun.	/ˌprɒksɪmə sɛnˈtɔːraɪ/
Przybylski's Star†	V816 Centauri	Centaurus	eponymous	Named after the Polish-Australian astronomer Antoni Przybylski.	
Pulcherrima	ε Boötis B	Boötes	Latin	Named Pulcherrima ('most beautiful') by Friedrich Georg Wilhelm von Struve.	
Puwuh Atarung	ι Piscium	Pisces	Balinese	From a Balinese constellation of battling quails, corresponding to Pisces.	
Qedty	δ Coronae Australis	Corona Australis	Egyptian	From the ancient Egyptian constellation Qedty (ḳdty), the Two Nets.	
Qigong	δ Boötis A	Boötes	Chinese	From the Chinese asterism Qī Gōng (Seven Excellencies, 七公).	
Quadrans	44 Boötis A	Boötes	Latin	From the historical constellation Quadrans Muralis.	
Ramus	102 Herculis	Hercules	Latin	From the historical constellation Ramus Pomifer (Cerberus et Ramus).	
Ran	ε Eridani	Eridanus	Norse	NameExoWorlds 2015; Named after Rán, the Norse goddess of the sea.	//
Rana	δ Eridani	Eridanus	Latin	Rana is Latin for 'frog'.	
Rangifer	49 Cassiopeiae A	Cassiopeia	Latin	From the historical constellation Rangifer (or Tarandus).	
Rapeto	HD 153950	Scorpius	Malagasy	NameExoWorlds 2019; Malagasy proposal; the name of a giant creature from folklore.	//
Rasalas	μ Leonis	Leo	Arabic		/ˈræsəlæs/
Rasalgethi	α^{1} Herculis Aa	Hercules	Arabic	Also spelled Ras Algethi.	/ˌræsəlˈdʒiːθi/
Rasalhague	α Ophiuchi A	Ophiuchus	Arabic	Also spelled Ras Alhague.	/ˈræsəlheɪɡ/
Rasalnaqa	ι Andromedae	Andromeda	Arabic	From an Arabic asterism of three stars, "The Head of the She-Camel".	
Rastaban	β Draconis A	Draco	Arabic		/ˈræstəbæn/
Red Rectangle	HD 44179	Monoceros	English	The star is surrounded by a nebula; the name describes its appearance.	
Regor†	γ Velorum	Vela	American	Named in honor of NASA astronaut Roger Chaffee, who died in the Apollo 1 fire: Regor is Roger spelled backwards. Also known as Suhail and Suhail al Muhlif, which also apply to λ Velorum (Suhail).	/ˈriːɡɔːr/
Regulus	α Leonis A	Leo	Latin	Latin for 'prince' or 'little king'. Regulus was known to Persian astrologers as "Venant, Watcher of the North", one of the royal stars.	/ˈrɛɡjʊləs/
Revati	ζ Piscium Aa	Pisces	Indic	Revatī (रेवती), the 27th nakshatra in Indian astronomy, also the name of a Hindu goddess.	/ˈreɪvəti/
Rhombus	α Reticuli A	Reticulum	Greek	From a historical name for Reticulum.	
Rigel	β Orionis A	Orion	Arabic	Traditional name first recorded in the Alfonsine Tables of 1252 and derived from the Arabic name الرجل الجوزاء اليسرى ar-rijl al-jawzāʾ al-yasrá ('the left leg (foot) of Jauzah') (rijl meaning 'leg, foot').	/ˈraɪdʒəl/
Rigil Kentaurus	α Centauri A	Centaurus	Arabic	The name is originally from Arabic: رجل قنطورس rijl qantūris ('foot of the centaur').	/ˈraɪdʒəl kɛnˈtɔːrəs/
Rosalíadecastro	HD 149143	Ophiuchus	Spanish	NameExoWorlds 2019; Spanish proposal; named after the writer Rosalía de Castro.	//
Rosette Eye	RAFGL 961	Monoceros	English	A star in the Rosette Nebula with surrounding dust that resembles a cat's eye.	
Rotanev	β Delphini A	Delphinus	Latin	The name appeared in Piazzi's Palermo Star Catalogue in 1814, added by Niccolò Cacciatore as a prank along with Sualocin (α Delphini); "Rotanev" is Venator, the Latin form of Italian: Cacciatore ('hunter'), spelt backwards.	/ˈroʊtənɛv/
Ruchbah	δ Cassiopeiae Aa	Cassiopeia	Arabic	Derived from Arabic: ركبة rukba ('knee'). The alternative historical name Ksora appeared in a 1951 publication, Atlas Coeli (Skalnate Pleso Atlas of the Heavens) by Czech astronomer Antonín Bečvář; professor Paul Kunitzch has been unable to find any clues as to the origin of the name.	/ˈrʌkbə/
Rukbat	α Sagittarii	Sagittarius	Arabic		/ˈrʌkbæt/
Sabik	η Ophiuchi A	Ophiuchus	Arabic		/ˈseɪbɪk/
Saclateni	ζ Aurigae A	Auriga	Arabic		/sækləˈtiːni/
Sadachbia	γ Aquarii Aa	Aquarius	Arabic		/səˈdækbiə/
Sadalbari	μ Pegasi	Pegasus	Arabic		/ˌsædəlˈbɛəri/
Sadalmelik	α Aquarii	Aquarius	Arabic		/ˌsædəlˈmɛlɪk/
Sadalsuud	β Aquarii A	Aquarius	Arabic		/ˌsædəlˈsuːəd/
Sadr	γ Cygni	Cygnus	Arabic		/ˈsædər/
Safina	88 Aquarii	Aquarius	Arabic	From an Arabic constellation, the Ship.	
Sagarmatha	HD 100777	Leo	Nepali	NameExoWorlds 2019; Nepalese proposal; the Nepali name for the world's highest peak (Mount Everest).	/sæɡərˈmɑːθə/
Saiph	κ Orionis	Orion	Arabic	Traditional name from Arabic: سیف الجبار sayf al-jabbār, literally 'saif ('sword') of the giant'.	/ˈseɪf/
Salm	τ Pegasi	Pegasus	Arabic		/ˈsɑːm/
Sāmaya	HD 205739	Piscis Austrinus	Sri Lankan	NameExoWorlds 2019; Sri Lankan proposal; means 'peace' in the Sinhala language.	//
Sansuna	HAT-P-34	Sagitta	Maltese	NameExoWorlds 2019; Maltese proposal; a mythological giant from Maltese folk tales.	//
Sapaki	WR 67a	Circinus	Quechua	Quechua word for 'solitary', so named as this star is thought to have formed in isolation.	
Sargas	θ Scorpii A	Scorpius	Sumerian		/ˈsɑːrɡæs/
Sarin	δ Herculis Aa	Hercules	unknown	Name originating in Antonín Bečvář's 1948 star atlas, Atlas Coeli Skalnaté Pleso.	/ˈsɛərɪn/
Sarvvis	δ Persei A	Perseus	Uralic	From the Sámi constellation Sarvvis, the (male) reindeer or moose.	
Sceptrum	53 Eridani A	Eridanus	Latin	Formerly "p Sceptri" in the constellation of Sceptrum Brandenburgicum.	/ˈsɛptrəm/
Scheat	β Pegasi	Pegasus	Arabic		/ˈʃiːæt/
Schedar	α Cassiopeiae	Cassiopeia	Arabic	Also traditionally written Schedir; both originally from Arabic: صدر ṣadr ('breast'); also called الضاة الكرسي aḍ-ḍāh al-kursiyy ('the lady in the chair' by Ulugh Beg, written as Dath Elkarti by Giovanni Battista Riccioli in 1651).	/ˈʃɛdɑːr/
Secunda Hyadum	δ1 Tauri Aa	Taurus	Latin		/sᵻˈkʌndə ˈhaɪədəm/
Segin	ε Cassiopeiae	Cassiopeia	unknown	From an erroneous transcription of Seginus, the traditional name for γ Boötis.	/ˈsɛɡᵻn/
Seginus	γ Boötis Aa	Boötes	Arabic	A mistranscription of the Arabic form of Boötes.	/sᵻˈdʒaɪnəs/
Shakata	75 Tauri	Taurus	Indic	From the Indian name for the Hyades, Rohiṇīśakaṭa (रोहिणीशकट), the cart of Rohini.	
Shakh	β Sagittae	Sagitta	Sumerian	From the Sumerian constellation ŠAḪ, the Pig.	
Sham	α Sagittae	Sagitta	Arabic	From Arabic al-sahm, the arrow.	/ˈʃæm/
Shama	HD 99109	Leo	Urdu	NameExoWorlds 2019; Pakistani proposal; an Urdu literary term meaning 'a small lamp or flame'.	//
Shangcheng	HD 19275	Cassiopeia	Chinese	From the Chinese star name Shàng Chéng (The Great Imperial Minister, 上丞).	
Shangwei	HD 42818 A	Camelopardalis	Chinese	From the Chinese star name Shàng Wèi (The Great Imperial Guard, 上衛).	
Shaomin	ρ Leonis	Leo	Chinese	Chinese star name, Shaomin (少民).	
Shaowei	γ Camelopardalis A	Camelopardalis	Chinese	From the Chinese star name Shào Wèi (The Second Imperial Guard, 少衛).	
Sharjah	HIP 79431	Scorpius	Emirati	NameExoWorlds 2019; United Arab Emirates proposal; named after Sharjah, the cultural capital and city of knowledge of the UAE.	/ˈʃɑːrdʒə/
Shatabhisha	λ Aquarii	Aquarius	Indic	Śatabhiṣa (शतभिष), "hundred physicians", the 24th nakshatra in Indian astronomy.	
Shaula	λ Scorpii Aa	Scorpius	Arabic		/ˈʃɔːlə/
Sheliak	β Lyrae Aa1	Lyra	Arabic		/ˈʃiːliæk/
Shengong	HD 153072 A	Scorpius	Chinese	From the Chinese star name Shengong (神宫, Divine Palace).	
Sheratan	β Arietis A	Aries	Arabic		/ˈʃɛrətæn/
Shimu	ζ Andromedae A	Andromeda	Chinese	From the Chinese star name Tian Shi Mu, The Eye of the Celestial Pig.	
Sika	HD 181720	Sagittarius	Ewe	NameExoWorlds 2019; Ghanaian proposal; means 'gold' in the Ewe language.	//
Simmakh	41 Piscium	Pisces	Sumerian	From SIM.MAḪ, the swallow, an ancient Mesopotamian constellation in the area of Pisces.	
Sirius	α Canis Majoris A	Canis Major	Greek	Ancient Greek: Σείριος 'the scorcher'; in Egyptian Sopdet, rendered in Greek as Σῶθις Sōthis. As the brightest star in the sky, Sirius has proper names in numerous cultures, including Polynesian (Māori: Takurua; Hawaiian: Ka'ulua ('Queen of Heaven'), among others). Also known as the "Dog Star".	/ˈsɪriəs/
Situla	κ Aquarii A	Aquarius	Latin		/ˈsɪtjʊlə/
Siwarha	α Orionis B	Orion	Arabic	"Her Bracelet" in Arabic, proposed by the discovery team.	
Skat	δ Aquarii A	Aquarius	Arabic		/ˈskæt/
Solaris	BD+14 4559	Pegasus	Latin	NameExoWorlds 2019; Polish proposal; named after Solaris, a novel by Stanisław Lem.	/soʊˈlɑːrᵻs/
Solitaire	58 Hydrae	Hydra	Latin	From the historical constellation Turdus Solitarius.	
Southern Crab	WRAY 16-147	Centaurus	English	The star is surrounded by a nebula that resembles the Crab Nebula.	
Speedy Mic	BO Microscopii	Microscopium	English	Named in reference to its very rapid rotation.	
Spica	α Virginis Aa	Virgo	Arabic	Other traditional names are Azimech, from Arabic: السماك الأعزل as-simāk al-ʾaʿzal ('the undefended') and Alarph, Arabic for 'the grape gatherer'. Known in Indian astronomy as Chitra ('the bright one').	/ˈspaɪkə/
Stella Ludoviciana	HD 116798	Ursa Major	Latin	Named by Johann Georg Liebknecht after Louis V, Landgrave of Hesse-Darmstadt.	
Stellio	α Lacertae	Lacerta	Latin	From a historical name for Lacerta, referring to the stellion.	
Stephanos	π Coronae Borealis	Corona Borealis	Greek	From the ancient Greek name of Corona Borealis (Στέφανος, wreath).	
Sterrennacht	HAT-P-6	Andromeda	Dutch	NameExoWorlds 2019; Dutch proposal; named after The Starry Night by Vincent van Gogh.	//
Stribor	HD 75898	Lynx	Slavic	NameExoWorlds 2019; Croatian proposal; named after Stribog, the god of winds in Slavic mythology. Stribor is also a character in the book Priče iz davnine (Croatian Tales of Long Ago) by Ivana Brlić-Mažuranić.	//
Sualocin	α Delphini Aa	Delphinus	Latin	The name appeared in Piazzi's Palermo Star Catalogue in 1814, added by Niccolò Cacciatore as a prank along with Rotanev (β Delphini); "Sualocin" is Nicolaus, the Latin form of Italian: Niccolò ('Nicholas'), spelt backwards.	/suˈɒloʊsɪn/
Subra	ο Leonis Aa	Leo	Arabic		/ˈsuːbrə/
Suhail	λ Velorum	Vela	Arabic	Traditionally, this name also applied to γ Velorum (Regor).	/ˈsuːheɪl/
Sukhurmashu	α^{1} Capricorni A	Capricornus	Akkadian	From the Akkadian name of Capricornus.	
Sulafat	γ Lyrae	Lyra	Arabic		/ˈsuːləfæt/
Syrma	ι Virginis	Virgo	Greek		/ˈsɜːrmə/
Tabit	π^{3} Orionis	Orion	Arabic		/ˈteɪbɪt/
Taika	HAT-P-40	Lacerta	Lithuanian	NameExoWorlds 2019; Lithuanian proposal; means 'peace' in the Lithuanian language.	//
Taiyangshou	χ Ursae Majoris	Ursa Major	Chinese	From the Chinese name 太陽守 Tàiyángshǒu ('guard of the Sun').	/ˌtaɪæŋˈʃoʊ/
Taiyi	8 Draconis	Draco	Chinese	From the Chinese name 太乙 Tàiyǐ or 太一 Tàiyī ('the great one'), both of which refer to Tao.	/ˌtaɪˈjiː/
Talitha	ι Ursae Majoris Aa	Ursa Major	Arabic	Also called Talitha Borealis, as Talitha originally referred to κ Ursae Majoris (Alkaphrah) and ι Ursae Majoris together.	/ˈtælᵻθə/
Tangra	WASP-21	Pegasus	Bulgarian	NameExoWorlds 2019; Bulgarian proposal; named after Tengri, the god early Bulgars worshiped.	//
Tania Australis	μ Ursae Majoris A	Ursa Major	Arab-Latin		/ˈteɪniə ɔːˈstreɪlᵻs/
Tania Borealis	λ Ursae Majoris	Ursa Major	Arab-Latin		/ˈteɪniə ˌbɒriˈælᵻs/
Tapecue	HD 63765	Carina	Guarani	NameExoWorlds 2019; Bolivian proposal; means 'Milky Way' in Guarani.	//
Tarandus	2 Ursae Minoris	Cepheus	Latin	From the historical constellation Rangifer (or Tarandus).	
Tarazed	γ Aquilae	Aquila	Persian	Alternative traditional spelling of Tarazet.	/ˈtærəzɛd/
Tarf	β Cancri A	Cancer	Arabic		/ˈtɑːrf/
Taygeta	19 Tauri Aa	Taurus	Greek	Member of the Pleiades open star cluster (M45). Taygete was one of the Pleiades sisters in Greek mythology.	/teɪˈɪdʒᵻtə/
Teegarden's Star†	LSPM J0253+1652	Aries	eponymous	Named after the American astronomer Bonnard J. Teegarden.	
Tegmine	ζ^{1} Cancri A	Cancer	Latine	Alternative traditional name of Tegmen.	/ˈtɛɡmᵻniː/
Tejat	μ Geminorum	Gemini	Arabic	Traditional name, also called Tejat Posterior.	/ˈtiːdʒət/
Telum	γ Sagittae	Sagitta	Latin	From a historical name for Sagitta, meaning "dart" in Latin.	
Tengshe	V424 Lacertae	Lacerta	Chinese	From the Chinese constellation Téng Shé (螣蛇, Flying Serpent).	
Tepennekhet	δ Equulei A	Equuleus	Egyptian	From the ancient Egyptian star name Tepennekhet, the Head of the Giant, within the constellation Nekhet.	
Tepiamenit	τ Boötis A	Boötes	Egyptian	From the ancient Egyptian asterism Tepiamenit, the Predecessor of the Pole.	
Terebellum	ω Sagittarii A	Sagittarius	Greek	From Ptolemy's τετράπλευρον tetrapleuron ('quadrilateral'), a group of four stars of which ω Sagittarii is the brightest.	/tɛrᵻˈbɛləm/
Tevel	HAT-P-9	Auriga	Hebrew	NameExoWorlds 2019; Israeli proposal; means 'world' or 'universe' in the Hebrew language.	//
Theemin	υ^{2} Eridani	Eridanus	Arabic	Also written as Theemim or Beemin.	/ˈθiːmən/
Thuban	α Draconis A	Draco	Arabic		/ˈθjuːbæn/
Tiaki	β Gruis	Grus	Polynesian	Traditional name from Tuamotu.	/tiˈɑːki/
Tianbang	ι Herculis A	Hercules	Chinese	From the Chinese asterism Tiān Bàng (Celestial Flail, 天棓).	
Tianbian	α Scuti	Scutum	Chinese	From the Chinese asterism Tiān Biàn (Market Officer, 天弁).	
Tiancang	θ Ceti	Cetus	Chinese	From the Chinese asterism Tiān Cāng (天倉, Square Celestial Granary).	
Tianfu	τ Aquilae	Aquila	Chinese	From the Chinese constellation Tianfu (天桴).	
Tiangang	β Piscis Austrini	Piscis Austrinus	Chinese	From the Chinese single-star asterism Tiān Gāng (天綱, Celestial Rope).	
Tianguan	ζ Tauri A	Taurus	Chinese	In Chinese, 天關 Tiānguān ('celestial gate'). Also reported as Akkadian: Shurnarkabti-sha-shūtū ('the star in the bull towards the south' or 'the southern star towards the chariot').	/tiænˈɡwɑːn/
Tianhun	20 Ceti	Cetus	Chinese	From the Chinese asterism Tiān Hùn (天溷), Celestial Pigsty.	
Tianji	ζ Herculis A	Hercules	Chinese	From the Chinese constellation Tiān Jì (Celestial Discipline, 天紀).	
Tianjinnan	ζ Cygni A	Cygnus	Chinese	From the Chinese constellation Tianjin (天津, "Celestial Ferry"); the southern star (nan).	
Tianjiu	22 Andromedae	Andromeda	Chinese	From the Chinese constellation Tiān Jiù (天厩, Celestial Stable).	
Tiansi	γ Cassiopeiae Aa	Cassiopeia	Chinese	From the Chinese asterism Tiān Sì (Heavenly Quadriga, 天駟). It has also been called "Navi", after Gus Grissom (his middle name "Ivan" spelled backward).	
Tianyi	7 Draconis	Draco	Chinese	From the Chinese name 天乙 Tiānyǐ or 天一 Tiānyī ('the Celestial Great One'), a deity in Taoism.	/tiænˈjiː/
Tianyue	4 Sagittarii A	Sagittarius	Chinese	From the Chinese constellation Tiān Yuè (天籥, Celestial Keyhole).	
Timir	HD 148427	Ophiuchus	Indic	NameExoWorlds 2019; Bangladeshi proposal; means 'darkness' in the Bengali language.	//
Tislit	WASP-161	Puppis	Amazigh	NameExoWorlds 2019; Moroccan proposal; named after Tislit Lake and means 'the bride' in the Amazigh language. Associated with a heartbroken girl in legend.	//
Titawin	υ Andromedae A	Andromeda	Moroccan	NameExoWorlds 2015; Named after the settlement in northern Morocco and UNESCO World Heritage Site now known as the medina (old town) of Tétouan.	/tɪtəˈwiːn/
Tojil	WASP-22	Eridanus	Mayan	NameExoWorlds 2019; Guatemalan proposal; the Tohil (patron deity) of the K'iche' Maya.	//
Toliman	α Centauri B	Centaurus	Arabic	The name is originally from Arabic: ظليمان ẓalīmān ('two (male) ostriches').	/ˈtɒlɪmæn/
Tonatiuh	HD 104985	Camelopardalis	Aztec	NameExoWorlds 2015; Named after Tonatiuh, the Aztec god of the Sun.	/toʊnəˈtiːuː/
Tonglingxing	HD 49878	Camelopardalis	Chinese	From the Chinese star name Tóng Líng (Phoenix Tree Mound, 桐陵), plus xing meaning star.	
Torcular	ο Piscium A	Pisces	Latin		/ˈtɔːrkjʊlər/
Triminus	ι Trianguli Aa	Triangulum	Latin	From the historical constellation Triangulum Minus.	
Tugongli	ξ Pegasi A	Pegasus	Chinese	From the Chinese asterism Tŭ Gōng Lì (Clerks of the Earth Official, 土公吏).	
Tuiren	HAT-P-36	Canes Venatici	Irish	NameExoWorlds 2019; Irish proposal. The aunt of the warrior Fionn mac Cumhaill of Irish legend.	//
Tupã	HD 108147	Crux	Gurani	NameExoWorlds 2019; Paraguayan proposal; Tupã is the name of God in the Guarani language.	//
Tupi	HD 23079	Reticulum	Tupi	NameExoWorlds 2019; Brazilian proposal; named after the indigenous Tupi people.	/ˈtuːpi/
Tureis	ρ Puppis	Puppis	Arabic		/ˈtjʊəreɪs/
Tusizuo	109 Herculis	Hercules	Chinese	From the Chinese asterism Tú Sì (屠肆, "Butcher's Shop"); the left star (zuo).	
Udang	θ Capricorni A	Capricornus	Balinese	From a Balinese constellation of a shrimp, corresponding to Capricornus.	
Udkadua	λ Andromedae A	Andromeda	Sumerian	From the ancient Sumerian constellation UD.KA.DU_{8}.A, "the storm demon with the gaping mouth".	
Ukdah	ι Hydrae	Hydra	Arabic		/ˈʌkdə/
Uklun	HD 102117	Centaurus	Pitkern	NameExoWorlds 2019; Pitcairn Islands proposal. Aklen means 'we/us' in the Pitkern language.	/ˈʌklən/
Uñallamacha	HD 155985	Scorpius	Quechua	From the Incan dark constellation Uñallamacha, the cria (baby llama).	
Unukalhai	α Serpentis	Serpens	Arabic	From Arabic: عنق الحية ʿunuq al-ḥayya ('the serpent's neck'), called Cor Serpentis ('Heart of the Serpent') in Latin.	/ˌjuːnək.ælˈheɪ/
Uridim	α Lupi	Lupus	Sumerian	From the ancient Sumerian constellation UR.IDIM, corresponding to Lupus.	
Urquchillay	ζ^{2} Lyrae	Lyra	Quechua	From the Incan constellation Urquchillay, llama god of animals.	
Uruk	HD 231701	Sagitta	Sumerian	NameExoWorlds 2019; Iraqi proposal; named after Uruk, an ancient city of Sumer and Babylonia in Mesopotamia.	/ˈʊrʊk/
Uúba	LTT 9779	Sculptor	U'wa	NameExoWorlds 2022; Colombian proposal; U'wa word referring to stars, seeds, or eyes.	
Van Maanen's Star†	Wolf 28	Pisces	eponymous	Named after the Dutch-American astronomer Adriaan van Maanen.	
Vega	α Lyrae	Lyra	Arabic	The name is originally from Arabic: النسر الواقع an-nasr al-wāqiʿ ('the alighting vulture') also translated as vulture cadens ('falling vulture') (see also Aetos Dios, Stymphalian birds). As the second brightest star in the northern sky, Vega has names in numerous cultures. In Chinese, it is known as 織女 ('weaving girl') from the Qi Xi love story. Vega is one of the vertices of the Summer Triangle asterism.	/ˈviːɡə, ˈveɪɡə/
Veritate	14 Andromedae	Andromeda	Latin	NameExoWorlds 2015; Latin for 'where there is truth'.	/ˌvɛrᵻˈteɪtiː/
Vindemiatrix	ε Virginis	Virgo	Latin	Vindemiatrix is Latin for '(female) grape gatherer'.	/vɪnˌdiːmiˈeɪtrɪks/
Waiping	δ Piscium	Pisces	Chinese	From the Chinese asterism Wài Píng (外屏, Outer Fence).	
Wasat	δ Geminorum Aa	Gemini	Arabic		/ˈweɪsət/
Wattle	WASP-19	Vela	Australian	NameExoWorlds 2022; Australian proposal; named after Acacia pycnantha, the national flower of Australia.	/ˈwɑːtl/
Wazn	β Columbae	Columba	Arabic		/ˈwɒzən/
Weixiu	35 Arietis	Aries	Chinese	From the Chinese constellation Wèi Xiù (胃宿, Stomach), one of the lunar mansions.	
Wezen	δ Canis Majoris	Canis Major	Arabic		/ˈwiːzən/
Wouri	WASP-69	Aquarius	Cameroonian	NameExoWorlds 2022; Cameroonian proposal; named after the river of the same name.	
Wurren	ζ Phoenicis Aa	Phoenix	Wardaman	A traditional name in the culture of the Wardaman people of the Northern Territory of Australia.	/ˈwʊrən/
Xami	α Circini	Circinus	South African	From the South African asterism xami di mura, "Eyes of the Lion", referring to α & β Centauri; the creature's face includes α Circini.	
Xamidimura	μ^{1} Scorpii Aa	Scorpius	South African	From the South African asterism xami di mura, "Eyes of the Lion", referring to μ^{1} & μ^{2} Scorpii (or alternatively α & β Centauri).	/ˌkæmidiˈmʊərə/
Xihe	HD 173416	Lyra	Chinese	NameExoWorlds 2019; Chinese proposal; Xihe is the goddess of the Sun in Chinese mythology. The star also represents the earliest Chinese astronomers and makers of calendars.	/ˈʃiːhə/
Xuange	λ Boötis	Boötes	Chinese	From the Chinese name 玄戈 Xuángē ('sombre lance').	//
Yaqana	ε Normae	Norma	Quechua	From the Incan dark constellation Yaqana, the llama.	
Yed Posterior	ε Ophiuchi	Ophiuchus	Arab-Latin		/ˌjɛd pɒˈstɪəriər/
Yed Prior	δ Ophiuchi	Ophiuchus	Arab-Latin		/ˌjɛd ˈpraɪər/
Yildun	δ Ursae Minoris	Ursa Minor	Turkic	From yildiz, Turkish for 'star'.	/jɪlˈdʌn/
Yunü	31 Leonis A	Leo	Chinese	Chinese star name, Yunü (御女).	
Yunyu	γ Piscium	Pisces	Chinese	From the Chinese asterism Yún Yǔ (Cloud and Rain, 雲雨).	
Yuyu	ι Cancri A	Cancer	Balinese	From a Balinese constellation of a crab, corresponding to Cancer.	
Zaniah	η Virginis Aa	Virgo	Arabic		/ˈzeɪniə/
Zaurak	γ Eridani	Eridanus	Arabic	Traditional name, alternatively spelled Zaurac; originally from Arabic: زورق zawraq ('boat').	/ˈzɔːræk/
Zavijava	β Virginis	Virgo	Arabic		/ˌzævᵻˈdʒævə/
Zembra	HATS-72	Aquarius	Tunisian	NameExoWorlds 2022; Tunisian proposal; named after the island of the same name.	
Zhang	υ^{1} Hydrae	Hydra	Chinese	From the Chinese name 張 Zhāng ('extended net').	/ˈdʒæŋ/
Zhou	β Serpentis A	Serpens	Chinese	Chinese star name.	
Zibal	ζ Eridani Aa	Eridanus	Arabic		/ˈzaɪbəl/
Zibbatu	112 Piscium	Pisces	Akkadian	Akkadian for "tails", an asterism in the Mesopotamian constellation of the swallow (SIM.MAḪ).	
Zosma	δ Leonis	Leo	Greek		/ˈzɒzmə/
Zubenelgenubi	α^{2} Librae Aa	Libra	Arabic		/zuːˌbɛnɛldʒᵻˈnuːbi/
Zubenelhakrabi	γ Librae A	Libra	Arabic		/zuːˌbɛnɛlˈhækrəbi/
Zubeneschamali	β Librae	Libra	Arabic		/zuːˌbɛnɛʃəˈmeɪli/
Zuogeng	η Arietis	Aries	Chinese	From the Chinese asterism Zuǒ Gēng (左更, Official in Charge of the Forest).	
Zuoqi	δ Sagittae A	Sagitta	Chinese	From the Chinese asterism Zuŏ Qí (Left Flag, 左旗).	

== See also ==
- Biblical names of stars
- List of Arabic star names
- List of brightest stars
- List of Chinese star names
- List of nearest bright stars
- List of proper names of exoplanets
- Lists of stars by constellation – gives variant names, derivations, and magnitudes.
- NameExoWorlds
- Stars named after people
- Table of stars with Bayer designations
