= Zeta Virginis =

Binary star system in the constellation of Virgo

ζ Virginis (incl. Heze)
- Location of ζ Virginis (circled)

Observation data Epoch J2000 Equinox ICRS
- Constellation: Virgo
- Right ascension: 13^{h} 34^{m} 41.591^{s}
- Declination: −00° 35′ 44.95″
- Apparent magnitude (V): +3.376

Characteristics
- Spectral type: A3 V
- U−B color index: +0.141
- B−V color index: +0.114

Astrometry
Radial velocity (R_{v})	−13.2 km/s
Proper motion (μ)	RA: −280.48±0.17 mas/yr Dec.: +49.05±0.12 mas/yr
Parallax (π)	44.03±0.19 mas
Distance	74.1 ± 0.3 ly (22.71 ± 0.10 pc)
Absolute magnitude (M_{V})	1.64±0.05

Details

ζ Vir A
Mass	2.041±0.024 M_{☉}
Radius	2.079±0.025 R_{☉}
Luminosity	17.885±0.252 L_{☉}
Surface gravity (log g)	4.12 cgs
Temperature	8247±52 K
Rotational velocity (v sin i)	222 km/s
Age	0.51 Gyr

ζ Vir B
Mass	0.168+0.012 −0.016 M_{☉}

Other designations
- Heze, ζ Vir, 79 Vir, BD+00°3076, FK5 501, GJ 3792, HD 118098, HIP 66249, HR 5107, SAO 139420, WDS J13347-0036, NT3, NGCA-V98

Database references
SIMBAD	data

Zeta Virginis (ζ Virginis, abbreviated Zeta Vir, ζ Vir) is a binary star in the zodiac constellation of Virgo. It is visible to the naked eye with an apparent visual magnitude of +3.376 and is located about a half degree south of the celestial equator. Based on parallax measurements obtained during the Hipparcos mission, it is about 74 light-years (23 parsecs) distant from the Sun.

The two components are designated Zeta Virginis A (officially named Heze /ˈhiːziː/, a mid-20th-century name for the system) and B.

== Nomenclature ==
ζ Virginis (Latinised to Zeta Virginis) is the system's Bayer designation. The designations of the two components as Zeta Virginis A and B derive from the convention used by the Washington Multiplicity Catalog (WMC) for multiple star systems, and adopted by the International Astronomical Union (IAU).

Zeta Virginis bore the name Heze in a 1951 publication, Atlas Coeli (Skalnate Pleso Atlas of the Heavens), by Czech astronomer Antonín Bečvář. Its origin is unknown. In 2016, the IAU organized a Working Group on Star Names (WGSN) to catalog and standardize proper names for stars. The WGSN decided to attribute proper names to individual stars rather than entire multiple systems. It approved the name Heze for the component Zeta Virginis A on 1 June 2018 and it is now so included in the List of IAU-approved Star Names.

In Chinese, 角宿 (Jiǎo Xiù), meaning Horn (asterism), refers to an asterism consisting of ζ Virginis and Spica. Consequently, the Chinese name for ζ Virginis is 角宿二 (Jiǎo Xiù èr, English: the Second Star of Horn).

In traditional Indian astronomy, the star Āpa is described as being 6° to the north of Apamvatsa (74 Virginis), so 11° north of Chitra (Spica), as first attested in the text Sūryasiddhānta. This position corresponds to ζ Virginis.

== Properties ==
The primary, ζ Virginis A, is a main sequence star with a spectral class A3 V, indicating that it is generating energy through the nuclear fusion of hydrogen at its core. This energy is being radiated from its outer envelope at an effective temperature of 8,247 K, giving it the white hue of an A-type star. It has twice the mass of the Sun and double the Sun's radius and is about a half billion years old.

The star was confirmed by Jan Ovidiu Tercu and Gabriel Cristian Neagu as a variable of DSCT type. The variability has an amplitude of 0.009 magnitudes and a main period of 0.097112 d. Other observed periods are 0.439, 1.069, 0.07691 and 0.07433 d. The variability was discovered during the datamining activity with the goal of increasing the student's investigative competences.

In 2010, a low mass stellar companion was discovered - Zeta Virginis B. Though it has not been under observation for a sufficient length of time to determine accurate orbital elements, it is estimated to be orbiting at an average separation of at least 24.9 AU with an orbital eccentricity of 0.16 or more and orbital period of a minimum of 124 years. This companion is a red dwarf star, which would explain the observed X-ray flux from this system.
