= HD 168592 =

Star in the constellation of Corona Australis

- Location of HD 168592 (circled)

Observation data Epoch J2000.0 Equinox ICRS
- Constellation: Corona Australis
- Right ascension: 18^{h} 22^{m} 18.57340^{s}
- Declination: −38° 39′ 24.8261″
- Apparent magnitude (V): 5.07±0.01

Characteristics
- Spectral type: K4/5 III
- B−V color index: +1.49

Astrometry
Radial velocity (R_{v})	17.8±2.8 km/s
Proper motion (μ)	RA: −41.570 mas/yr Dec.: −29.379 mas/yr
Parallax (π)	6.7176±0.1706 mas
Distance	490 ± 10 ly (149 ± 4 pc)
Absolute magnitude (M_{V})	−0.76

Details
Mass	1.18 M_{☉}
Radius	43.6±2.2 R_{☉}
Luminosity	666^{+44}_{−40} L_{☉}
Surface gravity (log g)	1.34 cgs
Temperature	4,148±122 K
Metallicity [Fe/H]	−0.13±0.01 dex
Rotational velocity (v sin i)	1.9±1.3 km/s

Other designations
- Magur, 7 G. Coronae Australis, CD−38°12729, CPD−38°7475, GC 25051, HD 168592, HIP 90037, HR 6862, SAO 210048

Database references
SIMBAD	data

HD 168592, also designated HR 6862 and named Magur, is a solitary star located in the southern constellation Corona Australis. It is faintly visible to the naked eye as an orange-hued star with an apparent magnitude of 5.07. Gaia DR3 parallax measurements place it at a distance of 490 light years and is currently receding with a heliocentric radial velocity of 18 km/s. At its current distance, HD 168592's brightness is diminished by 0.38 magnitudes due to interstellar dust. It has an absolute magnitude of −0.76.

HD 168592 has a stellar classification of K4/5 III, indicating that it is an evolved K-type star with the characteristics of a K4 and K5 giant star. It has a comparable mass to the Sun but the star has expanded to 43.6 times the Sun's radius. It radiates 666 times the luminosity of the Sun from its enlarged photosphere at an effective temperature of 4,148 K. HD 168592 is slightly metal deficient with an iron abundance 26% below solar levels. The star spins slowly, as is common for giant stars, with a projected rotational velocity of 1.9 km/s.

MA_{2}.GUR_{8}, the Boat, is an ancient Sumerian constellation in the region south of Sagittarius. The IAU Working Group on Star Names (WGSN) adopted the name Magur for this star on 13 August 2026; as identification is uncertain, the WGSN chose a faint star near η Sagittarii (Heryibwia), which represents an Egyptian boat constellation.
