= Krios and Kronos =

Wide binary star system in the constellation Cassiopeia

Observation data Epoch J2000 Equinox J2000
Constellation	Cassiopeia
- Krios
Right ascension	23^{h} 51^{m} 55.0287^{s}
Declination	+59° 42′ 48.601″
- Apparent magnitude (V): 9.70
- Kronos
Right ascension	23^{h} 52^{m} 09.2434^{s}
Declination	+59° 42′ 26.521″
- Apparent magnitude (V): 9.56

Characteristics

Krios
- Evolutionary stage: main sequence
- Spectral type: G0

Kronos
- Evolutionary stage: main sequence
- Spectral type: G2

Astrometry

Krios
Radial velocity (R_{v})	−21.2 km/s
Proper motion (μ)	RA: +89.332 mas/yr Dec.: −29.319 mas/yr
Parallax (π)	9.7559±0.0111 mas
Distance	334.3 ± 0.4 ly (102.5 ± 0.1 pc)

Kronos
Radial velocity (R_{v})	−20.13±0.18 km/s
Proper motion (μ)	RA: +88.949 mas/yr Dec.: −29.373 mas/yr
Parallax (π)	9.7353±0.0109 mas
Distance	335.0 ± 0.4 ly (102.7 ± 0.1 pc)

Details

Krios
Mass	1.06 M_{☉}
Radius	1.09 R_{☉}
Luminosity	1.28 L_{☉}
Surface gravity (log g)	4.43±0.028 cgs
Temperature	5,878±25 K
Metallicity [Fe/H]	0.01±0.010 dex
Rotational velocity (v sin i)	1.1 km/s
Age	4.00+1.51 −1.56 Gyr

Kronos
Mass	1.04 M_{☉}
Radius	1.16 R_{☉}
Luminosity	1.36 L_{☉}
Surface gravity (log g)	4.33±0.028 cgs
Temperature	5,803±25 K
Metallicity [Fe/H]	0.20±0.010 dex
Rotational velocity (v sin i)	2.5 km/s
Age	4.28+1.11 −1.03 Gyr

Other designations
- Krios: BD+58°2662, HD 240429, SAO 35851
- Kronos: BD+58°2663, HD 240430, SAO 35854

Database references
SIMBAD	HD 240429
- HD 240430

Krios (designated HD 240429) and Kronos (HD 240430) are a wide binary star system in the constellation of Cassiopeia. Both components of the system are yellow G-type main-sequence stars. Originally designated HD 240430 is a Sun-like star in appearance, but it seems to have eaten its own planets, for which it is given the nickname Kronos, after the Greek god and the leader of the first generation of Titans. Its unusual properties were described by a team of astrophysicists at Princeton University in 2017, led by Semyeong Oh.

The names Krios and Kronos both refer to the two Titans in Greek mythology, both of whom were part of the six sons and six daughters of Gaia and Uranus. They were first used for these stars in 2017 and were officially approved by the IAU Working Group on Star Names on 22 March 2026.

Kronos and Krios are about 350 light years away from Earth. Formed around four billion years ago, they originated from the same interstellar cloud. They are moving together through space and are assumed to orbit each other slowly, with an estimated period of about 10,000 years. Kronos has a higher abundance of elements such as lithium, magnesium and iron in its atmosphere than in that of Krios. They are the most chemically different binary stars to have been discovered to date. The unusual and rich chemical composition leads scientists to the conclusion that Kronos has destroyed many of its orbiting planets. According to estimates, it might have absorbed at least 15 Earth masses.

== See also ==
- HD 134439 and HD 134440
