= Xi Pegasi =

Double star in the constellation Pegasus

- Location of ξ Pegasi (circled in red)

Observation data Epoch J2000.0 Equinox ICRS
- Constellation: Pegasus
- Right ascension: 22^{h} 46^{m} 41.58118^{s}
- Declination: +12° 10′ 22.3854″
- Apparent magnitude (V): 4.195 + 11.70

Characteristics
- Spectral type: F6V + M3.5
- U−B color index: −0.015
- B−V color index: +0.502

Astrometry
Radial velocity (R_{v})	−5.3 km/s
Proper motion (μ)	RA: +234.18 mas/yr Dec.: −493.29 mas/yr
Parallax (π)	61.36±0.19 mas
Distance	53.2 ± 0.2 ly (16.30 ± 0.05 pc)
Absolute magnitude (M_{V})	3.25

Details

Xi Peg A
Mass	1.16+0.07 −0.05 M_{☉}
Radius	1.87±0.04 R_{☉}
Luminosity	4.55+0.26 −0.25 L_{☉}
Surface gravity (log g)	3.97±0.07 cgs
Temperature	6,155+60 −53 K
Metallicity [Fe/H]	−0.27±0.03 dex
Rotational velocity (v sin i)	12.67 km/s
Age	5.0±0.5 Gyr

Xi Peg B
Mass	0.32 M_{☉}
Temperature	3,569 K
Metallicity [Fe/H]	−0.25 dex

Other designations
- Tugongli, ξ Peg, 46 Peg, BD+11°4875, GJ 872, HD 215648, HIP 112447, HR 8665, SAO 108165

Database references
SIMBAD	A
- B

Xi Pegasi (ξ Peg, ξ Pegasi), also named Tugongli, is a double star in the northern constellation of Pegasus, the winged horse. Located in the horse's neck, the primary component is an F-type main sequence star that is visible to the naked eye with an apparent visual magnitude of 4.2. It is 87% larger and 15% more massive that the Sun, radiating 4.55 times the solar luminosity. Based upon parallax measurements taken with the Hipparcos spacecraft, it is located 53.2 ± 0.2 light years from the Sun.

The primary has been examined for the presence of an infrared excess that might indicate the presence of a debris disk, but none has been discovered. The common proper motion companion, NLTT 54820, is a twelfth magnitude red dwarf located at an angular separation of 11.4″ along a position angle of 96.9°. This corresponds to a projected physical separation of 192.3 AU.

In Chinese astronomy, this star is part of the asterism Tǔ Gōng Lì (Clerks of the Earth Official, 土公吏). The IAU Working Group on Star Names adopted the name Tugongli for this star on 13 August 2026, after this Chinese constellation.
