= Paloma (star) =

Binary star in the constellation Auriga

Observation data Epoch J2000 Equinox ICRS
- Constellation: Auriga
- Right ascension: 05^{h} 24^{m} 30.46433^{s}
- Declination: +42° 44′ 50.4606″
- Apparent magnitude (V): 16.1 to 18.5

Characteristics
- Evolutionary stage: white dwarf + red dwarf
- Apparent magnitude (G): 17.115±0.015
- Apparent magnitude (J): 16.289±0.096
- Apparent magnitude (H): 15.733±0.129
- Variable type: AM Her/DQ Her

Astrometry
Proper motion (μ)	RA: +4.821 mas/yr Dec.: −14.288 mas/yr
Parallax (π)	1.6883±0.0774 mas
Distance	1,930 ± 90 ly (590 ± 30 pc)

Orbit
Period (P)	157.187±0.018 min

Details

White dwarf
Mass	0.74+0.04 −0.05 M_{☉}
Radius	7400+400 −300 km
Rotation	136.235±0.025 min

Other designations
- Paloma, TIC 369210348, 2MASS J05243042+4244506, 1RXS J052430.2+424449, RX J0524+42

Database references
SIMBAD	data

Paloma is a binary star in the constellation Auriga, at a distance of about 1,930 light-years (590 parsecs). It is a magnetic cataclysmic variable, consisting of a white dwarf accreting material from a companion star. The two stars complete an orbit around each other in just 157 minutes (2.62 hours); the white dwarf has a rotation period of 136 minutes (2.27 hours).

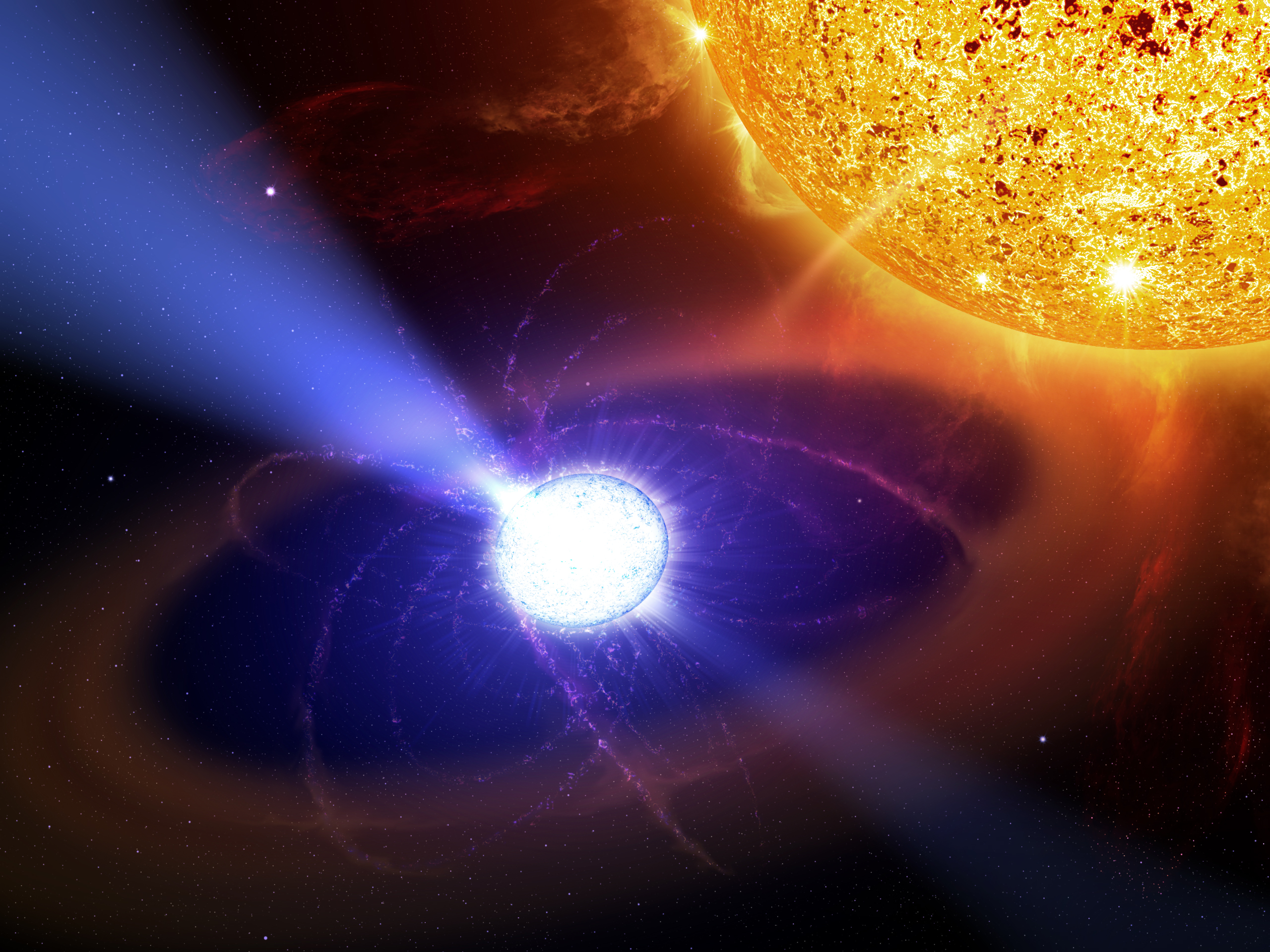
Artist's impression of an intermediate polar (AE Aquarii)

Paloma is a rare intermediate object between polars (AM Herculis stars), which have strong enough magnetic fields to synchronize the spin period of the white dwarf with the orbital period, and intermediate polars (DQ Herculis stars), which have a spin period much shorter than the orbital period. Paloma's spin-orbit ratio places it between these two categories, and it may represent a transitional object – an intermediate polar in the process of synchronizing and becoming a true polar.

The discovery of Paloma (then called RX J0524+42) was first announced at a conference in 2002. The first research paper on the system was published in 2007, which gave it the name Paloma (Spanish for dove or pigeon) in reference to the bird-like shape of the nearby supernova remnant VRO 42.05.01, which is unrelated to Paloma and only appears near it by chance. The name was officially approved by the IAU Working Group on Star Names on 19 April 2026.
