= CH Crucis =

Star in the constellation Crux

- Location of CH Crucis (circled in red)

Observation data Epoch J2000 Equinox ICRS
- Constellation: Crux
- Right ascension: 12^{h} 41^{m} 56.56918^{s}
- Declination: −59° 41′ 08.9544″
- Apparent magnitude (V): 4.91

Characteristics
- Evolutionary stage: subgiant
- Spectral type: B5III or B6IV
- U−B color index: −0.37
- B−V color index: −0.044±0.03
- Variable type: γ Cas

Astrometry
Radial velocity (R_{v})	+12.5±2.8 km/s
Proper motion (μ)	RA: -24.464 mas/yr Dec.: -4.226 mas/yr
Parallax (π)	3.8643±0.0811 mas
Distance	840 ± 20 ly (259 ± 5 pc)
Absolute magnitude (M_{V})	−2.41

Details
Mass	5.30±0.27 M_{☉}
Radius	11.20±0.22 R_{☉}
Luminosity	1,073 L_{☉}
Surface gravity (log g)	2.90±0.03 cgs
Temperature	10,600±106 K
Rotational velocity (v sin i)	240 km/s
Age	120 Myr

Other designations
- Lumbung, 39 Crucis, CH Cru, CPD−59°4393, HD 110335, HIP 61966, HR 4823, SAO 240161

Database references
SIMBAD	data

CH Crucis (39 Crucis), also named Lumbung, is a solitary variable star in the southern constellation of Crux. It has the Gould designation 39 G. Crucis. The object is visible to the naked eye as a faint, blue-white hued point of light with an apparent visual magnitude that fluctuates around 4.91. The star is located 844.02 light years distant from the Sun based on parallax, with an uncertainty of −17.35/+18.09 light years. and is drifting further away with a radial velocity of about +12.5 km/s. It is a member of the nearby Sco OB2 association.

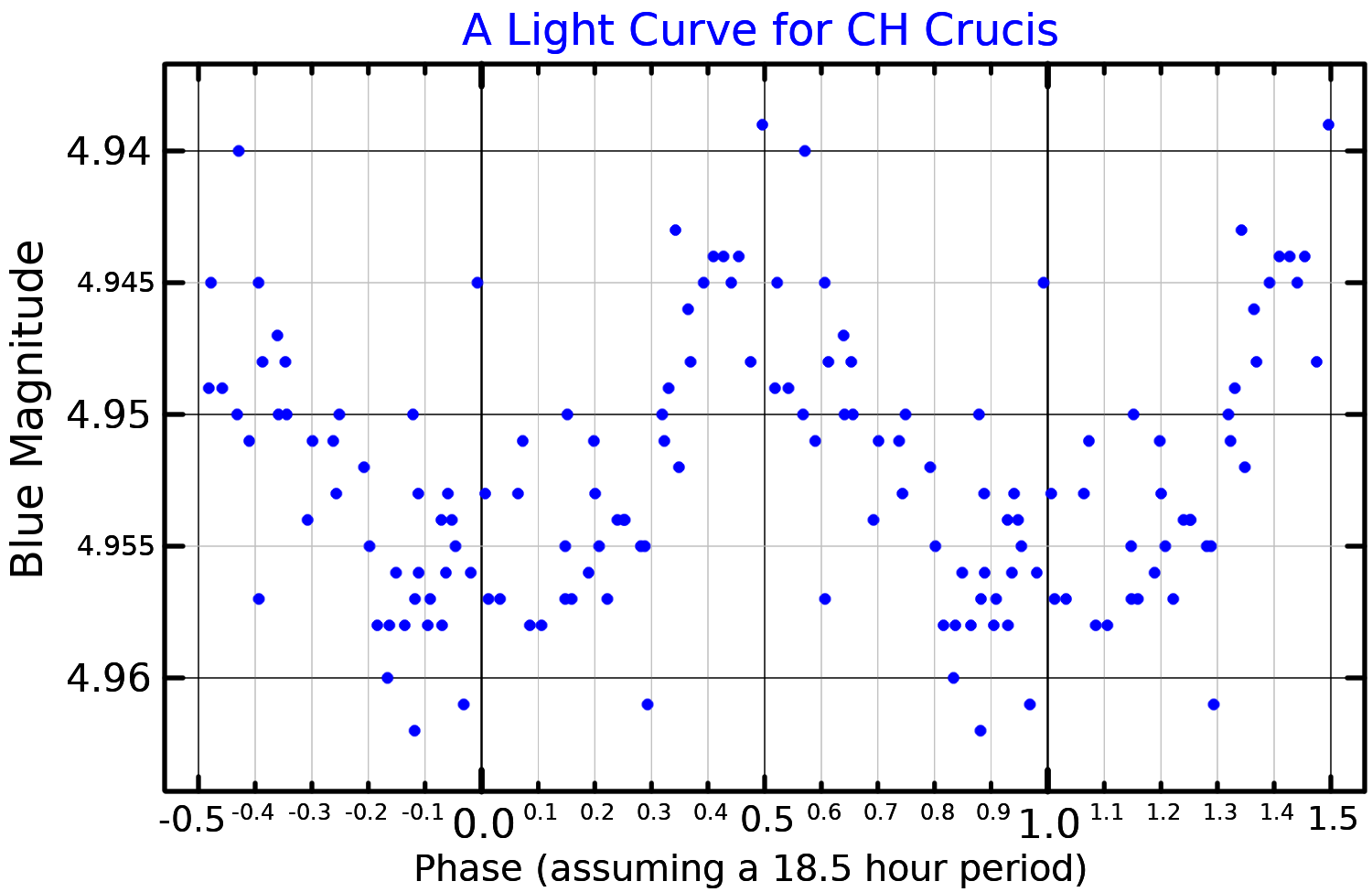
A blue band light curve for CH Crucis, plotted from data published by Balona et al. (1992)

This is a conventional shell star, which is understood to be a Be star that is being viewed edge-on. Houk (1975) found a stellar classification of B5III, while Hiltner et al. assigned it to B6IV; suggesting it is a B-type star that is evolving off the main sequence.Later literature has also listed the star as B6IVe+sh (Yudin 2001) and B8IV (Arcos et al. 2018), while an older source, Buscombe & Morris (1960)classified it as B7IV and identified it as a spectroscopic binary. indicating some variation in its spectral classification in the literature.

Samus et al. (2017) have tentatively classified it as a Gamma Cassiopeiae variable with a brightness range of 4.88–5.7 mag in the Johnson B band.

CH Crucis has 5.3 times the mass of the Sun and 11.2 times the Sun's radius. It is radiating 1,073 times the luminosity of the Sun from its photosphere at an effective temperature of 10,600 K. It is spinning rapidly with estimates of the projected rotational velocity ranging up to 240 or 250 km/s. This is giving the star an oblate shape with an equatorial bulge that is an estimated 18% larger than the polar radius.

The IAU Working Group on Star Names approved the name Lumbung for this star on 22 February 2026. Lumbung is a constellation from Bali (Indonesia), corresponding to Crux. The term is inherited from Malay, Proto-Malayo-Polynesian, meaning a rice barn or granary. The constellation of Lumbung is attested for ~1300 years in the cultural calendar and associated with Wednesday and the third day of an Oceanic market cycle.
