= 112 Piscium =

Star in the constellation Pisces

- Location of 112 Piscium (circled in red)

Observation data Epoch J2000 Equinox ICRS
- Constellation: Pisces
- Right ascension: 02^{h} 00^{m} 09.15955^{s}
- Declination: +03° 05′ 49.2504″
- Apparent magnitude (V): 5.89

Characteristics
- Evolutionary stage: subgiant
- Spectral type: G2IV or G0V
- B−V color index: 0.610

Astrometry
Radial velocity (R_{v})	−18.50±0.14 km/s
Proper motion (μ)	RA: +230.826 mas/yr Dec.: −256.471 mas/yr
Parallax (π)	31.4492±0.0566 mas
Distance	103.7 ± 0.2 ly (31.80 ± 0.06 pc)
Absolute magnitude (M_{V})	3.27

Details
Mass	1.100±0.134 M_{☉}
Radius	1.80±0.06 R_{☉}
Luminosity	3.74 L_{☉}
Surface gravity (log g)	4.03±0.10 cgs
Temperature	5967±70 K
Metallicity [Fe/H]	+0.21±0.07 dex
Rotational velocity (v sin i)	4.8±0.6 km/s
Age	5.9 Gyr

Other designations
- Zibbatu, 112 Psc, BD+02 311, GC 2416, GJ 83.2, HD 12235, HIP 9353, HR 582, SAO 110266, PPM 145195, LTT 10682, PLX 413

Database references
SIMBAD	data
Exoplanet Archive	data
ARICNS	data

112 Piscium, also named Zibbatu, is a star 103.7 light-years (31.8 parsecs) away in the constellation Pisces. With an apparent magnitude of 5.9, it is faintly visible to the naked eye under good viewing conditions. It appears near the brighter star Alpha Piscium (Alrescha) in the sky; the two are about 35′ apart.

== Nomenclature ==
112 Piscium is the star's Flamsteed designation; other designations include HD 12235 in the Henry Draper Catalogue. The Akkadian zibbātu "tails" is a Babylonian name for the constellation Pisces, which was originally visualized as the tails of a swallow (SIM.MAḪ). The IAU Working Group on Star Names adopted the name Zibbatu for 112 Piscium on 17 September 2026.

== Properties ==
The stellar classification of 112 Piscium is G2IV, indicating that it is a G-type subgiant star that has evolved off the main sequence. Other sources classify it as G0V, matching a main-sequence star. Gaia DR3 supports a subgiant classification. This star has about 1.1 times the mass and 1.8 times the radius of the Sun, and is radiating 3.7 times the Sun's luminosity from its photosphere at an effective temperature of 5967 K. Classified as a population I star, it is older than the Sun and has a somewhat higher metallicity (abundance of elements heavier than helium). It is thought to be a member of the HR 1614 group of stars that share a common motion through space.

== Planetary system ==
Two planetary companions to this star (HD 12235) were detected in 2022 using both radial velocity and astrometry. A companion was previously suspected. The inner planet has a minimum mass of about 10 Earth masses, making it a sub-Neptune; it orbits close to its star with a period of just 4.4 days. The outer planet is a super-Jupiter about 10 times the mass of Jupiter; it has a wide orbit with a period of about 100 years.

The 112 Piscium planetary system
Companion (in order from star)	Mass	Semimajor axis (AU)	Orbital period (days)	Eccentricity	Inclination (°)	Radius
b	≥10+1 −2 M_{🜨}	0.054±0.002	4.36305+0.00025 −0.00042	0.38+0.11 −0.25	—	—
c	9.9+3.2 −1.8 M_{J}	22.2+3.9 −2.8	36,337+9,732 −6,059	0.17+0.11 −0.15	47.7+12.7 −11.8	—
