= HD 45866 =

Star in the constellation of Camelopardalis

- Location of HD 45866 on the map (circled)

Observation data Epoch J2000.0 Equinox ICRS
- Constellation: Camelopardalis
- Right ascension: 06^{h} 40^{m} 28.87701^{s}
- Declination: +77° 59′ 44.8179″
- Apparent magnitude (V): 5.72±0.01

Characteristics
- Spectral type: K5 III
- B−V color index: +1.47

Astrometry
Radial velocity (R_{v})	−16.6±0.2 km/s
Proper motion (μ)	RA: +13.997 mas/yr Dec.: −5.701 mas/yr
Parallax (π)	4.4952±0.0455 mas
Distance	726 ± 7 ly (222 ± 2 pc)
Absolute magnitude (M_{V})	−0.89

Details
Mass	2.34±0.69 M_{☉}
Radius	49.6±2.6 R_{☉}
Luminosity	468±8 L_{☉}
Surface gravity (log g)	1.62±0.11 cgs
Temperature	4,207±140 K
Metallicity [Fe/H]	−0.11±0.01 dex
Age	1.15^{+0.51}_{−0.35} Gyr

Other designations
- Kamelos, AG+78°144, BD+78°227, FK5 2507, GC 8574, HD 45866, HIP 31940, HR 2363, SAO 5919

Database references
SIMBAD	data

HD 45866, also designated HR 2363 and named Kamelos, is a solitary star located in the northern circumpolar constellation Camelopardalis. It is faintly visible to the naked eye as an orange-hued star with an apparent magnitude of 5.72. Gaia DR3 parallax measurements place it 726 light years away and it is currently approaching the Solar System with a heliocentric radial velocity of −16.6 km/s. At its current distance, HD 45866's brightness is diminished by 0.26 magnitudes due to interstellar dust. It has an absolute magnitude of −0.89

This is an evolved red giant with a stellar classification of K5 III. It has 2.34 times the mass of the Sun but it has expanded to nearly 50 times the radius of the Sun at an age of 1.15 billion years. It radiates 468 times the luminosity of the Sun from its photosphere at an effective temperature of 4,207 K. It has an iron abundance 78% of the Sun's, making it slightly metal deficient.

The IAU Working Group on Star Names approved the name Kamelos for this star on 25 December 2025, and it is now so entered in the IAU Catalog of Star Names. Kamelos is Greek for camel, a pun on the constellation Camelopardalis (literally "spotted camel", representing a giraffe), applied to an arbitrary star in the constellation. Based on the same association, Jacob Bartsch in 1624 had used Camelus Rebeccae as another name for Camelopardalis, referring to the camel of the biblical figure Rebecca.
