= 74 Virginis =

Star in the constellation Virgo

- Location of 74 Virginis (circled in red)

Observation data Epoch J2000.0 Equinox J2000.0 (ICRS)
- Constellation: Virgo
- Right ascension: 13^{h} 31^{m} 57.88506^{s}
- Declination: −06° 15′ 20.9419″
- Apparent magnitude (V): 4.69±0.01

Characteristics
- Spectral type: M2.5 III
- B−V color index: 1.606±0.035

Astrometry
Radial velocity (R_{v})	+18.71±0.15 km/s
Proper motion (μ)	RA: −103.94 mas/yr Dec.: −43.87 mas/yr
Parallax (π)	8.16±0.19 mas
Distance	400 ± 9 ly (123 ± 3 pc)
Absolute magnitude (M_{V})	−0.76

Details
Mass	1.40±0.12 M_{☉}
Radius	78.38+1.98 −1.90 R_{☉}
Luminosity	831.5±56.8 L_{☉}
Temperature	3,500±46 K
Metallicity [Fe/H]	0.00 dex
Age	2.90±0.68 Gyr

Other designations
- Apamvatsa, l Vir, 74 Vir, NSV 6297, BD−05°3714, FK5 3079, HD 117675, HIP 66006, HR 5095, SAO 139390

Database references
SIMBAD	data

74 Virginis, formally named Apamvatsa, is a single star in the zodiac constellation of Virgo. It is visible to the naked eye as a faint red-hued star with an apparent visual magnitude of 4.69. The star is positioned near the ecliptic and thus is subject to lunar occultations. The measured annual parallax of 8.16 mas provides a distance estimate of around 400 light-years from the Sun. At that range, the visual magnitude of the star is diminished by an extinction of 0.46±0.02 due to interstellar dust. It is moving further from the Earth with a heliocentric radial velocity of +19 km/s.

This is an aging red giant star with a stellar classification of M2.5 III, which indicates it has exhausted the hydrogen at its core and evolved away from the main sequence. It is a suspected variable star that may vary in brightness with an amplitude of 0.07 in magnitude. The star is roughly 2.9 billion years old with 1.4 times the mass of the Sun and has expanded to around 78 times the Sun's radius. 74 Virginis is radiating 832 times the Sun's luminosity from its enlarged photosphere at an effective temperature of 3,500 K.

In traditional Indian astronomy, the star Āpaṃvatsa ("calf of the waters") is described as being 5° to the north of Chitra (Spica), as first attested in the text Sūryasiddhānta. This position corresponds to 74 Virginis. The IAU Working Group on Star Names approved the name Apamvatsa for 74 Virginis on 16 October 2025 and it is now so entered in the IAU Catalog of Star Names.
