= IAU Working Group on Star Names =

IAU group to catalog and standardize proper names for stars

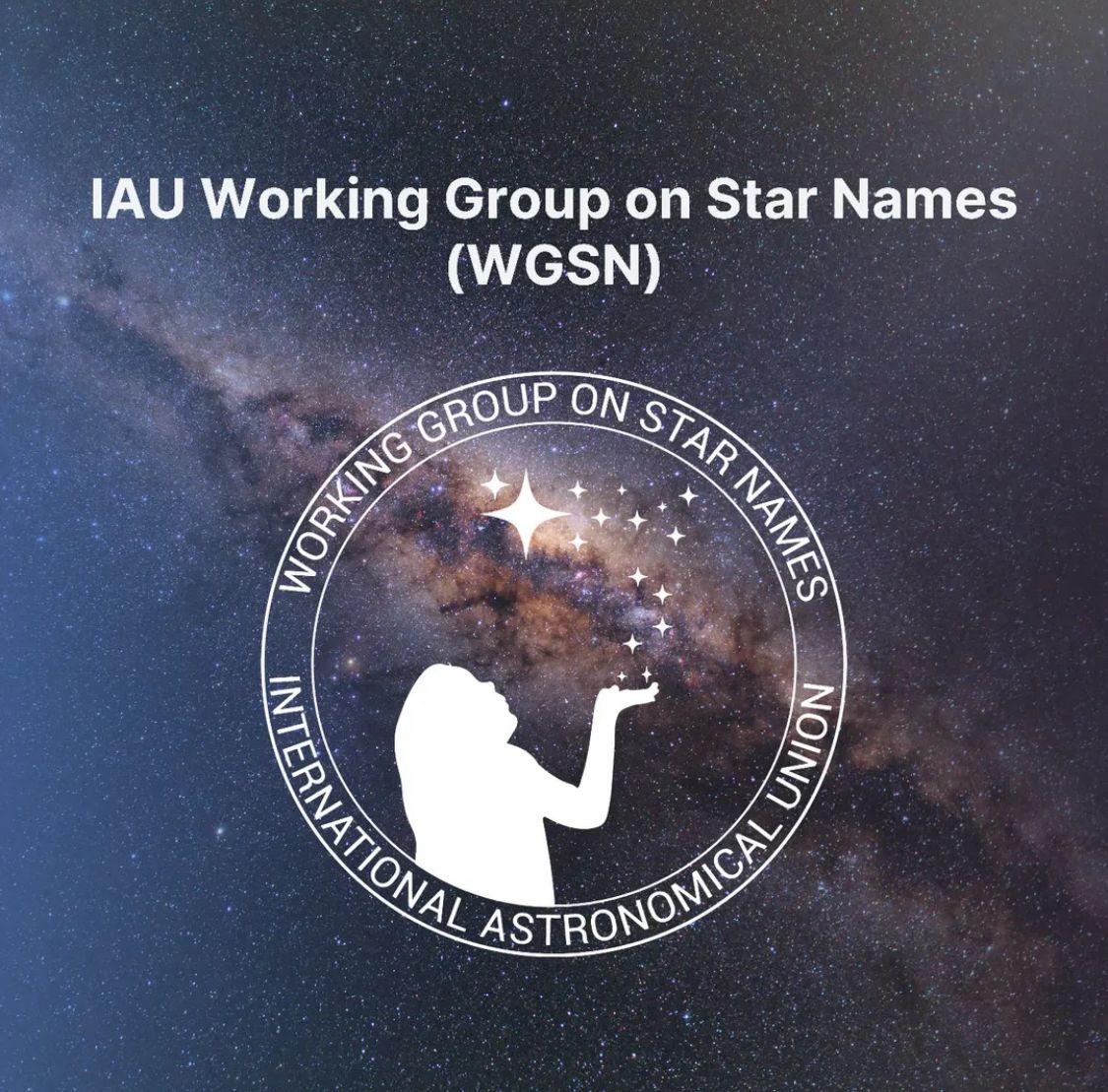
WGSN logo

The International Astronomical Union (IAU) established a Working Group on Star Names (WGSN) in May 2016 to catalog and standardize proper names for stars for the international astronomical community. It operates under Division C – Education, Outreach and Heritage.

The IAU states that it is keen to make a distinction between the terms name and designation. To the IAU, name refers to the (usually colloquial) term used for a star in everyday conversation, while designation is solely alphanumerical, and used almost exclusively in official catalogues and for professional astronomy. (The WGSN notes that transliterated Bayer designations (e.g., Tau Ceti) are considered a special historical case and are treated as designations.)

== Terms of reference ==
The terms of reference for the WGSN for the period 2016–2018 were approved by the IAU Executive Committee at its meeting on 6 May 2016. In summary, these are to:

- establish IAU guidelines for the proposal and adoption of names for stars,
- carry out a search of the literature for candidate names,
- adopt new unique names for stars of scientific and historical value,
- assemble and disseminate an official IAU star name catalog.
  (The current version is titled "IAU-Catalog of Star Names".)

While initially the WGSN would focus on incorporating 'past' names from history and culture, in the future it would be responsible for defining the rules and enabling the process by which new names can be proposed by members of the international astronomical community.

== Naming guidelines ==
The WGSN adopted preliminary guidelines for unique star names. In summary, these are:

- Names preserving world heritage are strongly encouraged; common and cultural names preferred over new.
- Names should normally be 4–16 characters in length; short names preferred over long.
- Names should be pronounceable in some language and be non-offensive.
- Names should not be too similar to an existing name of a star, planet, planetary satellite, or minor planet.
- Names of individuals are prohibited for bright stars (except for rare historical cases).
- Contrived names are discouraged (except for rare historical cases).
- Names of events principally known for political or military activities; of a principally commercial nature; of pet animals and acronyms are prohibited.

The WGSN explicitly recognized the names of exoplanets and their host stars approved by the Executive Committee Working Group Public Naming of Planets and Planetary Satellites, including the names of stars adopted during the 2015 NameExoWorlds campaign.

=== Multiple stars ===
The WGSN decided to attribute proper names to individual stars rather than entire multiple systems. For example, the name Fomalhaut specifically refers to the bright A component of a 3 star system. The informal names often attributed to other components in a physical multiple (e.g., Fomalhaut B) are treated as unofficial (albeit described as "useful nicknames"), and not included in the List of IAU-approved Star Names. In the List, the components are clearly identified by their identifiers in the Washington Double Star Catalog. Where a component letter is not explicitly listed, the WGSN says that the name should be understood to be attributed to the visually brightest component.

=== Chinese names ===
General guidelines for Chinese star names were adopted during 2017. In summary, these are:

- The Chinese Sky During the Han: Constellating Stars and Society (Sun & Kistemaker 1997) is considered authoritative with early Chinese name-star identifications and spellings,
- adopting of Chinese asterism names for individual stars should be avoided as it would cause confusion,
- Pinyin spelling is preferred.

== Program of work ==
The WGSN decided to focus during the rest of 2016 on standardizing common names and spellings for the brightest few hundred stars with published names, and on compiling cultural names, with names for faint stars to be discussed in the future (it regarded 'bright stars' as those with designations in the Bright Star Catalogue and any physical companions; 'faint stars' as any other Galactic stars, substellar objects, and stellar remnants).

The main aim for the next few years is to delve into worldwide astronomical history and culture, looking to determine the best-known stellar appellations to use as the officially recognised names. Beyond this point, once the names of many of the bright stars in the sky have been officially approved and catalogued, the WGSN will turn its focus towards establishing a format and template for the rules, criteria and process by which proposals for stellar names can be accepted from professional astronomers, as well as from the general public.

== Adopted names ==
The WGSN's first bulletin dated July 2016 included a table of 125 stars comprising the first two batches of names approved by the WGSN (on 30 June and 20 July 2016) together with names of stars (including five traditional star names: Ain, Edasich, Errai, Fomalhaut, and Pollux) reviewed and adopted by the IAU Executive Committee Working Group on Public Naming of Planets and Planetary Satellites during the 2015 NameExoWorlds campaign and recognized by the WGSN.

Further batches of names were approved on 21 August, 12 September, 5 October and 6 November 2016. These were listed in a table of 102 stars included in the WGSN's second bulletin in November 2016. The next additions were done on 1 February 2017 (13 new star names), 30 June 2017 (29), 5 September 2017 (41), 19 November 2017 (3) and 6 June 2018 (17). The WGSN maintains a continuously updated IAU Catalog of Star Names, since 2023 hosted on the exopla.net website.

The first list includes two stars given names of individuals during the NameExoWorlds process: "Cervantes" for the star μ Arae (honoring the writer Miguel de Cervantes Saavedra) and "Copernicus" for the star 55 Cancri A (honoring the astronomer Nicolaus Copernicus). The WGSN approved the historical name Cor Caroli (Latin for 'heart of Charles') for the star α Canum Venaticorum, so named in honour of King Charles I of England by Sir Charles Scarborough, his physician. The 1 February 2017 update included the approval of the historical name for Barnard's Star, named after the American astronomer E.E. Barnard.

== All Skies Encyclopaedia ==
The All Skies Encyclopaedia is a website maintained by the WGSN to document cultural names of stars and constellations. Launched in 2024, it is hosted by the University of Jena and uses the MediaWiki software.

== See also ==
- Astronomical naming conventions
- List of astronomical societies
- List of proper names of stars
- Stars named after people
- Stellar designations and names
