= List of exoplanets and planetary debris around giant stars =

This is a list of notable confirmed exoplanets and planetary debris disks around giant stars, mainly sorted by distance to the Sun.

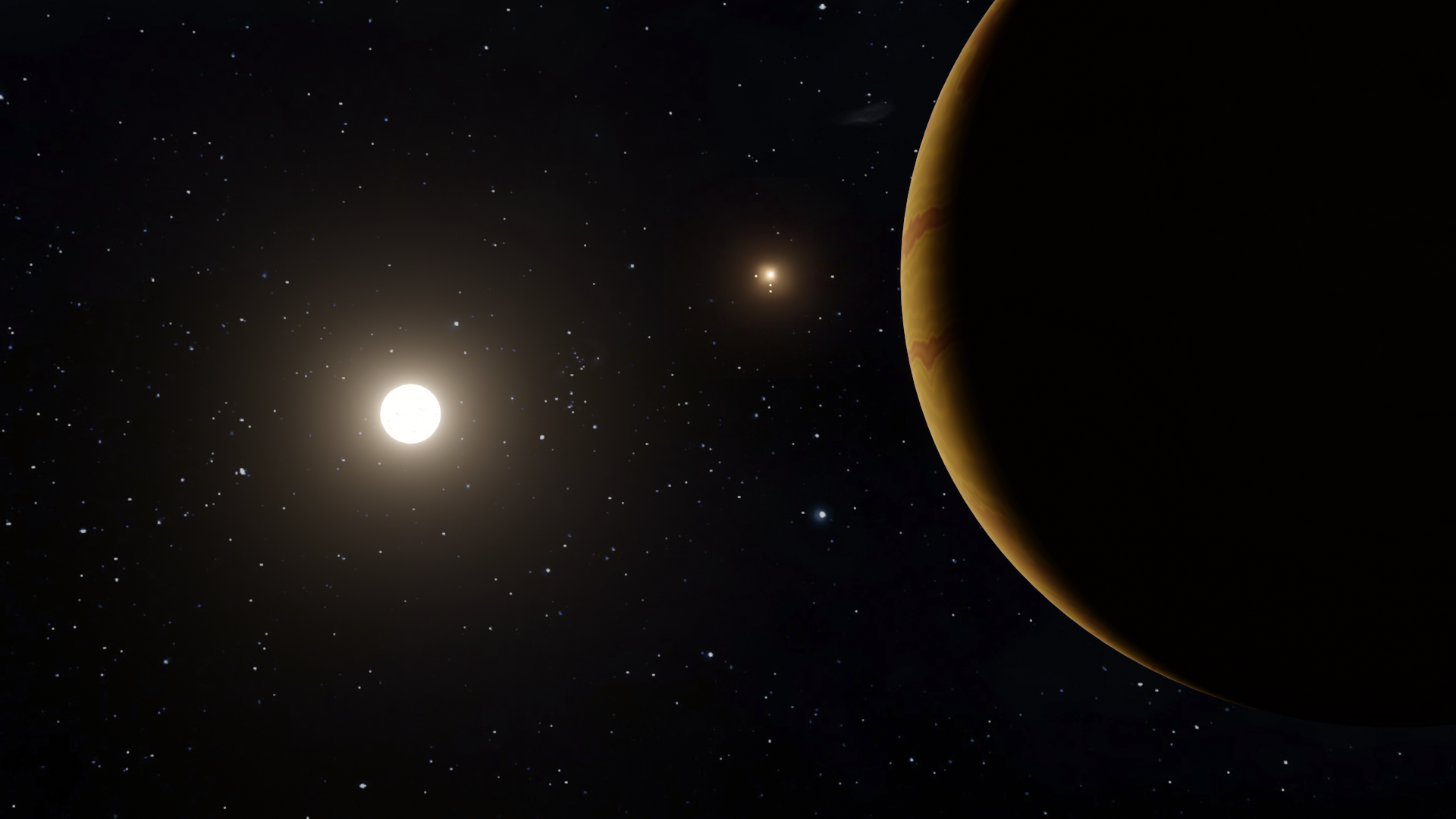
Artist's impression of the planet Tadmor (Gamma Cephei Ab) and its giant host star

== Characteristics of exoplanets around giant stars ==
Exoplanets orbiting giant stars usually have the following attributes:

- Have orbital period larger than 150 days.
- Orbit metal-poor stars (which are stars with lower content of heavier elements than hydrogen and helium than the Sun).
- Are gas giants or super-Jupiters, with masses in range from 3 to 10 Jupiter masses.

== Table ==
=== Confirmed ===
Companion	Spectral type of host star	Mass of host star (Solar mass)	Radius of host star (Solar radius)	Mass of planet (Jupiter mass)	Radius of planet (Jupiter radius)	Orbital period of planet (day)	Eccentricity of planet	Distance (light-year)	Discovery method of companion	Discovery year of companion	References and notes
Gamma Cephei Ab (Tadmor)	K1III-IV CN1	1.27	4.74	1.62–16.9	–	903.3	0.049	45.0	Radial vel.	1988 / 2003	The first suspected planet to be discovered around a giant star and first evidence for an exoplanet to receive later confirmation in general
Debris disk of Rho Puppis	F5IIkF2IIm	1.50	3.52	–	–	–	–	63.5	Infrared excess	2007	
Hamal b	K1IIIb	1.50	15.19	≥1.8	–	380.8	0.25	65.8	Radial vel.	2011	Brightest exoplanet host star as viewed from Earth
Kappa Coronae Borealis b	K0III-IV	1.32	4.77	≥1.81	–	1285	0.17	97.8	Radial vel.	2012	
Debris disk of Kappa Coronae Borealis	K0III-IV	1.32	4.77	–	–	–	–	97.8	Interferometry imaging	2013	The disk extends out from 50 AU to 180 AU
Iota Draconis b (Hypatia)	K2III	1.56	11.99	16.4	–	510.8	0.70	101.2	Radial vel.	2002	The first confirmed planet or brown dwarf to be discovered around a giant star
Iota Draconis c	K2III	1.56	11.99	17.0	–	24800 (approximate)	0.46	101.2	Radial vel.	2021	Might be a brown dwarf
Mu Leonis b	K2IIIb CN1 Ca1	1.5	11.89	2.4–12.6	–	357.8	0.09	124.1	Radial vel.	2014	
Beta Ursae Minoris b	K4III	1.3	44.13	≥6.1	–	522.3	0.19	130.9	Radial vel.	2014	
Psi^{1} Aquarii b	K1III	0.77–1.76	10.8	≥3.23	–	181.1	0.03	147.6	Radial vel.	2013	
Nu Ophiuchi b	K0 IIIa CN –1	2.88	13.85	24.2	–	529.5	0.12	151	Radial vel.	2003	Their masses are above the deuterium burning limit, so might be brown dwarfs, but also consistent with planetary formation in 6:1 orbital resonance
Nu Ophiuchi c	K0 IIIa CN –1	2.88	13.85	26.8	–	3173	0.18	151	Radial vel.	2012	Their masses are above the deuterium burning limit, so might be brown dwarfs, but also consistent with planetary formation in 6:1 orbital resonance
Delta Virginis b	M3III	1.19	67.4	≥15.83	–	466.6	0.36	198	Radial vel.	2023	Likely a brown dwarf
18 Delphini b (Arion)	G6III	2.35	7.19	≥9.21	–	982.8	0.02	245	Radial vel.	2008	
HD 203949 b	K2III	1.00	10.30	≥8.2	–	184.2	0.02	257	Radial vel.	2014	
Omega Serpentis b	G8III	1.20	10.48	≥0.74	–	278.6	0.18	273	Radial vel.	2013	
24 Boötis b	G4III-IV Fe-1	1.46	10.04	≥0.91	–	30.35	0.04	308	Radial vel.	2018	Its existence has defied current models of planetary evolution
Chi Virginis b	K2III	2.28	20.15	≥10.7	–	882.6	0.26	315	Radial vel.	2009	
81 Ceti b	? (K0III or G5III)	1.6	11.1	≥3.31	–	1005	0.037	343	Radial vel.	2008	
HD 139357 b	K4III	1.1–2.16	11.47	≥9.76	–	1126	0.10	370	Radial vel.	2009	
HD 47536 b	K1III	0.94	23.08	≥4.0	–	434.9	0.30	408	Radial vel.	2003	The host star is metal-poor
Debris disk of 51 Ophiuchi	B9.5IIIe	3.30	8.08	–	–	–	–	410	Interferometry imaging	2009	
17 Scorpii b	K3III	1.22	25.92	≥4.32	–	578.4	0.06	448	Radial vel.	2020	
HD 100655 b (Sazum)	G9III	2.2	8.80	≥1.7	–	157.6	0.085	451	Radial vel.	2012	One of two least massive planets found orbiting red clump star
8 Ursae Minoris b (Halla)	G8III	1.51	10.73	≥1.65	–	93.31	0.06	532	Radial vel.	2015	The planet might have survived the expansion of its host star
HD 76920 b	K1III	1.22	8.68	≥3.57	–	415.9	0.88	597	Radial vel.	2017	Known exoplanet with the most eccentric orbit around a giant star
HD 220074 b	M2III	1.2	59.6	≥11.1	–	672.1	0.14	1070	Radial vel.	2012	The first planet to be discovered around an M-type giant star
HD 13189 b	K1II-III	1.2	38.0	≥14	–	471.6	0.28	1590	Radial vel.	2005	Might be a brown dwarf
Kepler-56b	? (RGB)	1.29	4.18	0.07	0.32	10.503	–	3030	Transit	2012	The orbits of Kepler-56 b and c are coplanar but misaligned 45° to the host star's equator
Kepler-56c	? (RGB)	1.29	4.18	0.57	0.70	21.405	–	3030	Transit	2012	The orbits of Kepler-56 b and c are coplanar but misaligned 45° to the host star's equator
Kepler-56d	? (RGB)	1.29	4.18	≥5.61	–	1002	0.20	3030	Radial vel.	2016	
Kepler-91b	K3	1.19	6.20	0.81	1.37	6.246	0.07	4385	Transit + Ellipsoidal variation	2013	

=== Unconfirmed, disputed and refuted exoplanets around giant stars ===
Companion	Spectral type of host star	Mass of host star (Solar mass)	Radius of host star (Solar radius)	Mass of planet (Jupiter mass)	Radius of planet (Jupiter radius)	Orbital period of planet (day)	Eccentricity of planet	Distance (light-year)	Discovery method of companion	Discovery year of companion	References and notes
HD 56096 b	M5IIIe	0.66	123	12+16 −12	–	1713	–	210	Stellar flux variation	2016	First candidate planet orbiting an AGB star
14 Andromedae b (Spe)	K0III	0.90–1.4	12.67	≥3.56	–	186.7	~0	248	Radial vel.	2008	Disputed existence
42 Draconis b (Orbitar)	K1.5III	1.07	19.78	–	–	–	–	295	Radial vel.	2009, refuted in 2025	Rare case of exoplanet named by IAU that was conclusively refuted
R Leonis b	M6IIIe–M9IIIe	0.7	320–350	≥2	–	1898	0	372	Stellar flux variation	2009	Might have a long trail of evaporating planetary material
BD+20 2457 b	K2II	1 or less	49 ± 26	≥13	–	380	–	4800	Radial vel.	2009	Likely brown dwarfs. The host star is metal-poor and might be extragalactic in origin
BD+20 2457 c	K2II	1 or less	49 ± 26	≥7	–	622	–	4800	Radial vel.	2009	Likely brown dwarfs. The host star is metal-poor and might be extragalactic in origin

== See also ==
- Lists of planets
