= 6 Lyncis =

Star in the constellation Lynx

- Location of 6 Lyncis (circled in red)

Observation data Epoch J2000.0 Equinox J2000.0
- Constellation: Lynx
- Right ascension: 06^{h} 30^{m} 47.10759^{s}
- Declination: +58° 09′ 45.4798″
- Apparent magnitude (V): 5.86

Characteristics
- Spectral type: K0.5 IIIb Fe0.5
- B−V color index: 0.934±0.006

Astrometry
Radial velocity (R_{v})	+39.57±0.20 km/s
Proper motion (μ)	RA: −30.691 mas/yr Dec.: −338.612 mas/yr
Parallax (π)	18.2183±0.0486 mas
Distance	179.0 ± 0.5 ly (54.9 ± 0.1 pc)
Absolute magnitude (M_{V})	2.13

Details
Mass	1.37±0.14 M_{☉}
Radius	5.12±0.16 R_{☉}
Luminosity	14.2±0.9 L_{☉}
Surface gravity (log g)	3.17±0.03 cgs
Temperature	4,949±58 K
Metallicity [Fe/H]	−0.18±0.04 dex
Rotational velocity (v sin i)	1.8 km/s
Age	2.8±0.2 Gyr

Other designations
- 6 Lyn, BD+58°932, GC 8416, HD 45410, HIP 31039, HR 2331, SAO 25771

Database references
SIMBAD	data
Exoplanet Archive	data

6 Lyncis is a star in the northern constellation of Lynx, located approximately 179 light years from Earth. It is visible to the naked eye as a dim, orange-hued star with an apparent visual magnitude of 5.86. This object is moving away from the Earth with a heliocentric radial velocity of +40 km/s. It has a relatively high proper motion, traversing the celestial sphere at the rate of 0.341 arc seconds per annum. One exoplanet is known to orbit it.

This is an aging giant star with a stellar classification of K0.5 IIIb Fe0.5, which indicates it has a mild overabundance of iron in its spectrum. At 2.8 billion years old, it has exhausted the hydrogen at its core, causing it to evolve away from the main sequence. As a consequence, it has expanded to 5.12 times the radius of the Sun although it only has 1.37 times the Sun's mass. The star is radiating 14.2 times the luminosity of the Sun from its swollen photosphere at an effective temperature of 4,950 K.

== Planetary system ==
In July 2008, the planet 6 Lyncis b was announced by Bun'ei Sato and collaborators from the Okayama Planet Search Program, along with 14 Andromedae b and 81 Ceti b. The planet was found to have minimum mass of 2.4 Jupiter masses and period of 899 days.

The 6 Lyncis planetary system
Companion (in order from star)	Mass	Semimajor axis (AU)	Orbital period (days)	Eccentricity	Inclination	Radius
b	≥2.010±0.077 M_{J}	2.11±0.11	934.3±8.6	0.073±0.036	—	—

== See also ==
- 14 Andromedae
- 81 Ceti
- HD 167042
- Lists of exoplanets
