= Okayama Planet Search Program =

Program that searches exoplanets around stars

The Okayama Planet Search Program (OPSP) was started in 2001 with the goal of spectroscopically searching for planetary systems around stars. It reported on the detection of 3 new extrasolar planets: (Arion, Fortitudo, and Arkas), around intermediate-mass G and K giants Musica, Libertas, and Intercrus. Also, it updated the orbital parameters of Meztli, the first planet discovered around the G giants from the survey, by using the data collected during the past six years. Since 2001, it has been conducting a precise Doppler survey of about 300 G and K giants using a 1.88m telescope, the High Dispersion Echelle Spectrograph (HIDES), and an iodine absorption cell I2 cell at the Okayama Astrophysical Observatory (OAO).

== Discoveries ==
Planets discovered
Name	Mass (M_{J})	Discovery date
Arion	10.3	2008
Fortitudo	2.8	2008
Arkas	2.7	2008
81 Ceti b	5.3	2008
Spe	4.8	2008
6 Lyncis b	2.01	2008

== Observatory ==
- Okayama Astrophysical Observatory, Kurashiki in Japan
