= 81 Ceti =

Star in the constellation of Cetus

- Location of 81 Ceti (circled in red)

Observation data Epoch J2000.0 Equinox ICRS
- Constellation: Cetus
- Right ascension: 02^{h} 37^{m} 41.80208^{s}
- Declination: −03° 23′ 46.2259″
- Apparent magnitude (V): 5.65

Characteristics
- Evolutionary stage: red clump
- Spectral type: K0III or G5III
- B−V color index: 1.021±0.001

Astrometry
Radial velocity (R_{v})	+9.14±0.12 km/s
Proper motion (μ)	RA: +41.765 mas/yr Dec.: −43.379 mas/yr
Parallax (π)	9.5199±0.0756 mas
Distance	343 ± 3 ly (105.0 ± 0.8 pc)
Absolute magnitude (M_{V})	0.82

Details
Mass	1.6±0.2 M_{☉}
Radius	11.1±0.3 R_{☉}
Luminosity	60.0±0.8 L_{☉}
Surface gravity (log g)	2.5±0.1 cgs
Temperature	4,825±41 K
Metallicity [Fe/H]	0.00±0.04 dex
Rotational velocity (v sin i)	1.20±0.47 km/s
Age	2.5±0.9 Gyr

Other designations
- 81 Cet, BD−04°436, GC 3158, HD 16400, HIP 12247, HR 771, SAO 130026

Database references
SIMBAD	data
Exoplanet Archive	data

81 Ceti is a star located approximately 343 light-years away from the Sun in the equatorial constellation of Cetus. 81 Ceti is the Flamsteed designation for this object. It is visible to the naked eye as a dim, yellow-hued point of light with an apparent visual magnitude of 5.65. The star is drifting further away from the Earth with a heliocentric radial velocity of +9 km/s.

This is an aging K-type giant star with a stellar classification of K0III, having exhausted the supply of hydrogen at its core and expanded to 11 times the Sun's radius. It is a red clump giant, which indicates it is on the horizontal branch and is generating energy from core helium fusion. The star is now 2.5 billion years old with 1.6 times the mass of the Sun. It is radiating 60 times the luminosity of the Sun from its enlarged photosphere at an effective temperature of 4,825 K.

== Planetary system ==
In July 2008, the planet 81 Ceti b was announced by Sato and collaborators, along with 14 Andromedae b and 6 Lyncis b. The planet was found to be a super-Jupiter, with 5.3 times the mass of Jupiter. It takes 953 days for it to complete its orbit around the star. The planetary parameters were updated in 2023.

The 81 Ceti planetary system
Companion (in order from star)	Mass	Semimajor axis (AU)	Orbital period (days)	Eccentricity	Inclination (°)	Radius
b	≥3.307+0.078 −0.067 M_{J}	2.104±0.003	1005.57+1.84 −1.94	0.037+0.015 −0.025	—	—

== See also ==
- 14 Andromedae
- 6 Lyncis
- 79 Ceti
- 94 Ceti
- HD 167042
- Lists of exoplanets
