= HD 139357 b =

Extrasolar planet in the constellation Draco

Discovery
- Discovered by: Doellinger et al.
- Discovery site: TLS
- Discovery date: March 20, 2009
- Detection method: radial velocity

Orbital characteristics
- Apastron: 2.60 AU (389,000,000 km)
- Periastron: 2.12 AU (317,000,000 km)
- Semi-major axis: 2.36 ± 0.2 AU (353,000,000 ± 30,000,000 km)
- Eccentricity: 0.1 ± 0.02
- Orbital period (sidereal): 1125.7 ± 9 d 3.0819 ± 0.0246 y
- Time of periastron: 2452466.7 ± 3.2
- Argument of periastron: 235.4 ± 10.6
- Star: HD 139357

HD 139357 b is a very massive extrasolar planet or brown dwarf located approximately 390 light years away, orbiting the 6th magnitude K-type giant star HD 139357 in the constellation of Draco. The detection occurred on March 20, 2009, which was the first day of spring.

The actual mass and radius of this body remain uncertain, but it has a minimum mass of nearly 10 times that of Jupiter and a radius of probably no more than 1.2 times Jupiter's. Most likely this is a brown dwarf rather than a planet. The reason why the object's true mass was initially unknown is due to the undetermined inclination of its orbital plane. Follow up observations via direct imaging may determine its radius and orbital inclination, thereby giving its density and surface gravity, which will allow a determination as to whether this object is a brown dwarf or a supermassive planet.

A 2022 study estimated the true mass of HD 139357 b at about 16.38 M_{J} via astrometry, although this estimate is poorly constrained. If this is the true mass, the object would be a brown dwarf.

As it is typical for supermassive planets, this orbits further from its host star than Earth is from the Sun. The planet's year is over three Earth years. However, the orbital eccentricity of this object is much greater than Earth's: 0.1 vs. 0.017. Like most known extrasolar planets, it was detected by the wobble method, which detects planets through the circular wobbling motion of the star caused by the gravity of orbiting body.

== See also ==
- 42 Draconis b
- Iota Draconis b
