= 14 Andromedae =

Star in the constellation Andromeda

- Location of 14 Andromedae (circled)

Observation data Epoch J2000.0 Equinox ICRS
- Constellation: Andromeda
- Right ascension: 23^{h} 31^{m} 17.41325^{s}
- Declination: +39° 14′ 10.3147″
- Apparent magnitude (V): 5.22

Characteristics
- Evolutionary stage: Horizontal branch
- Spectral type: K0 III
- B−V color index: 1.029±0.003
- Variable type: None

Astrometry
Radial velocity (R_{v})	−59.81±0.12 km/s
Proper motion (μ)	RA: +286.898 mas/yr Dec.: −84.043 mas/yr
Parallax (π)	13.1681±0.0727 mas
Distance	248 ± 1 ly (75.9 ± 0.4 pc)
Absolute magnitude (M_{V})	0.73

Details
Mass	0.898±0.069, 1.4±0.2 M_{☉}
Radius	12.67±0.39 R_{☉}
Luminosity	58.18±2.55 L_{☉}
Surface gravity (log g)	2.60±0.01 cgs
Temperature	4,483±50 K
Metallicity [Fe/H]	−0.30±0.04 dex
Rotational velocity (v sin i)	1.63±0.47 km/s
Age	3.2±2.1, 13.19±2.04 Gyr

Other designations
- Veritate, 14 And, NSV 14599, BD+38°5023, GC 32703, HD 221345, HIP 116076, HR 8930, SAO 73311, PPM 88889, 2MASS J23311742+3914102

Database references
SIMBAD	data
Exoplanet Archive	data

14 Andromedae, abbreviated 14 And, also named Veritate /ˌvɛrɪˈteɪtiː/, is a single, orange-hued giant star situated 248 light-years away in the northern constellation of Andromeda. It is dimly visible to the naked eye with an apparent visual magnitude of 5.22. The star is moving closer to the Earth with a heliocentric radial velocity of −60 km/s. In 2008 an extrasolar planet (designated 14 Andromedae b, later named Spe) was discovered to be orbiting the star.

This is a red clump giant with a stellar classification of K0 III, a star that has passed the first-giant branch and is now on the horizontal branch, generating energy through helium fusion at its core. The star has expanded to 12.7 times the Sun's radius and is radiating 58 times the Sun's luminosity from its enlarged photosphere at an effective temperature of 4,483 K. Its exact mass and age are still uncertain.

== Nomenclature ==
14 Andromedae is the star's Flamsteed designation. Following its discovery the planet was designated 14 Andromedae b.

In July 2014 the International Astronomical Union launched NameExoWorlds, a process for giving proper names to certain exoplanets and their host stars. The process involved public nomination and voting for the new names. In December 2015, the IAU announced the winning names were Veritate for this star and Spe for its planet.

The winning names were based on those submitted by the Thunder Bay Centre of the Royal Astronomical Society of Canada); namely 'Veritas' and 'Spes', Latin for 'truth' and 'hope', respectively. (Veritas was also the Roman goddess of truth and Spes was the Roman goddess of hope.) The IAU substituted the ablative forms 'Veritate' and 'Spe', which mean 'where there is truth' and 'where there is hope', respectively. This was because 'Veritas' is the name of an asteroid important for the study of the Solar System.

In 2016, the IAU organized a Working Group on Star Names (WGSN) to catalog and standardize proper names for stars. In its first bulletin of July 2016, the WGSN explicitly recognized the names of exoplanets and their host stars approved by the Executive Committee Working Group Public Naming of Planets and Planetary Satellites, including the names of stars adopted during the 2015 NameExoWorlds campaign. This star is now so entered in the IAU Catalog of Star Names.

== Planetary system ==
In 2008, an exoplanet was announced to be orbiting the star, detected by the radial velocity method. The planet was found to have a minimum mass of 4.8 Jupiter masses and to be orbiting in a circular orbit that takes 186 days to complete. The planet is one of the few known planets to be orbiting an evolved intermediate-mass star and one of the closest-orbiting (such planets have only been discovered around clump giants).

A 2023 study of planets around evolved stars, while presenting updated parameters for this planet, found that the radial velocity variations are correlated with stellar activity signals, casting doubt on the planet's existence. Based on this, a 2024 study listed it as one of several doubtful planets around giant stars (along with other named planets around 41 Lyncis and 42 Draconis).

The 14 Andromedae planetary system
Companion (in order from star)	Mass	Semimajor axis (AU)	Orbital period (days)	Eccentricity	Inclination (°)	Radius
b (Spe) (disputed)	≥3.559+0.114 −0.122 M_{J}	0.775	186.76+0.11 −0.12	0	—	—

== See also ==
- 6 Lyncis
- 81 Ceti
- HD 167042
- Upsilon Andromedae
