= Abol =

Abol is a given name. Notable people with the name include:

- Abol Fath Khan (1755–1787), the third Shah of Zand dynasty, who ruled the Persian Empire for a period in 1779
- Abol Hassan Ispahani (1902–1981), Pakistani legislator and diplomat
- Abol-Ghasem Kashani (born 1882), prominent Twelver Shi'a Muslim cleric and former Parliament Speaker of Iran
- Khaled Abol Naga (born 1966), Egyptian actor, TV host, producer and director

== See also ==
- Abol Tabol, collection of Bengali children's poems and rhymes composed by Sukumar Ray, first published in 1923
- Abol, IAU condoned proper name of exoplanet HD 16175 b, orbiting Buna (HD 16175), in the constellation of Andromeda
