= HD 104985 =

Star in the constellation of Camelopardalis

HD 104985 / Tonatiuh
- Location of HD 104985 (circled in red)

Observation data Epoch J2000 Equinox ICRS
- Constellation: Camelopardalis
- Right ascension: 12^{h} 05^{m} 15.1172^{s}
- Declination: +76° 54′ 20.643″
- Apparent magnitude (V): 5.78

Characteristics
- Evolutionary stage: red clump
- Spectral type: G8.5IIIb
- B−V color index: 1.029±0.005

Astrometry
Radial velocity (R_{v})	−20.34(13) km/s
Proper motion (μ)	RA: 147.183(40) mas/yr Dec.: −92.464(41) mas/yr
Parallax (π)	9.9280±0.0383 mas
Distance	329 ± 1 ly (100.7 ± 0.4 pc)
Absolute magnitude (M_{V})	0.85

Details
Mass	1.22±0.05 M_{☉}
Radius	10.64±0.29 R_{☉}
Luminosity	51±1 L_{☉}
Surface gravity (log g)	2.43±0.06 cgs
Temperature	4,685±15 K
Metallicity [Fe/H]	−0.36±0.02 dex
Age	4.39±0.54 Gyr

Other designations
- Tonatiuh, BD+77°461, FK5 451, GC 16514, HD 104985, HIP 58952, HR 4609, SAO 7500, NLTT 29548

Database references
SIMBAD	data
Exoplanet Archive	data

HD 104985, formally named Tonatiuh (/toʊnəˈtiːuː/), is a solitary star with an exoplanetary companion in the northern constellation of Camelopardalis. The companion is designated HD 104985 b and named Meztli (/ˈmɛstli/). This star has an apparent visual magnitude of 5.78 and thus is dimly visible to the naked eye under favorable seeing conditions. It is located at a distance of approximately 329 light years from the Sun based on parallax, but is drifting closer with a radial velocity of −20 km/s.

The stellar classification of this star is G8.5IIIb, indicating this is an evolved giant star that has exhausted the supply of hydrogen at its core then cooled and expanded off the main sequence. It is located in the red clump region of the HR diagram, suggesting it is on the horizontal branch and generating energy through core helium fusion. The star is approximately 4.4 billion years old with 1.2 times the mass of the Sun and has expanded to 10.6 times the Sun's radius. It is radiating 51 times the luminosity of the Sun from its enlarged photosphere at an effective temperature of 4,730 K.

== Naming ==
HD 104985 is the star's entry in the Henry Draper Catalogue. Following its discovery in 2003 the planet was designated HD 104985 b. In July 2014 the International Astronomical Union launched NameExoWorlds, a process for giving proper names to certain exoplanets and their host stars. The process involved public nomination and voting for the new names. In December 2015, the IAU announced the winning names were Tonatiuh for this star and Meztli for its planet.

The winning names were those submitted by the Sociedad Astronomica Urania of Morelos, Mexico. 'Tonatiuh' was the Aztec god of the Sun; 'Meztli' was the Aztec goddess of the Moon.

In 2016, the IAU organized a Working Group on Star Names (WGSN) to catalog and standardize proper names for stars. In its first bulletin of July 2016, the WGSN explicitly recognized the names of exoplanets and their host stars approved by the Executive Committee Working Group Public Naming of Planets and Planetary Satellites, including the names of stars adopted during the 2015 NameExoWorlds campaign. This star is now so entered in the IAU Catalog of Star Names.

== Planetary system ==
In 2003, radial velocity measurements made by the Okayama Planet Search Program led to the announcement of an exoplanetary companion. It is orbiting at a distance of 0.95 AU (142 Gm) with a period of 199.5 days with an eccentricity (ovalness) of 0.09. Since the inclination of the exoplanet's orbital plane is unknown, only a lower bound on its mass can be determined. It has at least 8.3 times the mass of Jupiter.

The HD 104985 planetary system
Companion (in order from star)	Mass	Semimajor axis (AU)	Orbital period (days)	Eccentricity	Inclination (°)	Radius
b (Meztli)	≥5.559+0.110 −0.122 M_{J}	0.715	199.68+0.09 −0.07	0.047+0.015 −0.028	—	—

== See also ==
- List of extrasolar planets
