= Gamma Cephei =

Binary star in the constellation Cepheus

- Location of γ Cephei (circled in red)

Observation data Epoch J2000 Equinox ICRS
- Constellation: Cepheus
- Right ascension: 23^{h} 39^{m} 20.910^{s}
- Declination: +77° 37′ 56.51″
- Apparent magnitude (V): 3.21

Characteristics

Gamma Cephei A
- Evolutionary stage: Red-giant branch
- Spectral type: K1III-IV CN1
- U−B color index: +0.94
- B−V color index: +1.03
- Variable type: Suspected

Gamma Cephei B
- Spectral type: M4V

Astrometry
Radial velocity (R_{v})	−42.82±0.30 km/s
Proper motion (μ)	RA: –64.860 mas/yr Dec.: 171.159 mas/yr
Parallax (π)	72.5167±0.1470 mas
Distance	44.98 ± 0.09 ly (13.79 ± 0.03 pc)
Absolute magnitude (M_{V})	2.62

Orbit
Primary	A
Secondary	B
Period (P)	69.9±0.4 yr
Semi-major axis (a)	20.07±0.06 AU
Eccentricity (e)	0.422±0.002
Inclination (i)	119.8±0.1°
Longitude of the node (Ω)	17.2±0.2°
Periastron epoch (T)	2,473,832+245 −236 days
Argument of periastron (ω) (secondary)	341.9±0.2°
Semi-amplitude (K_{1}) (primary)	1.711±0.003 km/s

Details

Gamma Cephei A
Mass	1.26±0.01 M_{☉}
Radius	4.75±0.01 R_{☉}
Luminosity	11.6±0.6 L_{☉}
Surface gravity (log g)	3.18 cgs
Temperature	4,806±60 K
Metallicity [Fe/H]	0.20±0.07 dex
Rotational velocity (v sin i)	0.0±0.9 km/s
Age	5.7+0.8 −0.9 Gyr

Gamma Cephei B
Mass	0.396±0.002 M_{☉}

Other designations
- Errai, γ Cep, 35 Cep, BD+76°928, FK5 893, GJ 903, HD 222404, HIP 116727, HR 8974, SAO 10818, PLX 5725.00

Database references
SIMBAD	data
Exoplanet Archive	data

Gamma Cephei is a binary star system in the northern constellation of Cepheus. Its name is a Bayer designation that is Latinized from γ Cephei, and abbreviated Gamma Cep or γ Cep. This system is visible to the naked eye as a point of light with a combined apparent visual magnitude of 3.21. Based on parallax measurements, it is located at a distance of approximately 45 light-years from Earth.

The primary, Gamma Cephei A, is officially named Errai, pronounced /ɛˈreɪ.iː/, the traditional name of the system. It is a stellar class K1 orange giant or subgiant star. The companion, Gamma Cephei B, is a low mass red dwarf star. A confirmed exoplanet is orbiting the primary; it is designated Gamma Cephei Ab, later named Tadmor.

Gamma Cephei will succeed Polaris as the Earth's northern pole star, due to axial precession. It will be closer to the northern celestial pole than Polaris around 3157 CE and will make its closest approach around 4094 CE. The "title" will pass to Iota Cephei some time around 5200 CE.

== Description ==
Gamma Cephei has an apparent magnitude of 3.21, nearly all of which is accounted for by the primary component, Gamma Cephei A. It is a binary star system with an orbital period of 66.8 years and an eccentricity (ovalness) of 0.14. The pair are orbiting at a semi-major axis of 19.6 AU.

The primary is about 5.7 billion years old and has evolved off the main sequence, having fused all of the hydrogen in its core. It has 1.3 times the mass of the Sun and has expanded to 4.75 times the Sun's radius. The star is radiating nearly 12 times the luminosity of the Sun from its photosphere at an effective temperature of 4,806 K. The secondary component, Gamma Cephei B, has a mass approximately 0.40 times that of the Sun. It is probably a red dwarf of class M4, 6.2 magnitudes fainter than the primary. It is assumed to be of similar age to its primary.

The spectrum of this star has served as one of the stable anchor points by which other stars are classified. It was listed as a standard star for the spectral class K1 IV in 1943, 1953 and 1973. However, in 1989, it was given as a spectral standard for K1 III-IV. Its spectrum is notable for the strength of the cyano radical (CN) bands. Analysis of the spectrum in 2018 gave a best match for a spectral type of K1 III.

γ Cephei is catalogued as a suspected variable star with a brightness range between magnitudes 3.18 and 3.24, based on its inclusion in an 1884 list of suspected variable stars.

== Nomenclature ==
γ Cephei (Latinised to Gamma Cephei) is the system's Bayer designation. Under the rules for naming objects in multiple star systems the two components are designated A and B. Following its discovery the planet was designated Gamma Cephei Ab.

The system bore a traditional name variously spelled as Errai, Er Rai or Alrai, deriving from the Arabic الراعي (ar-rā‘ī), meaning 'the shepherd'. (The star Beta Ophiuchi is sometimes also called Alrai, but it is more commonly known as Cebalrai or Kelb Alrai, meaning 'shepherd's dog'.) In 2016, the International Astronomical Union organized a Working Group on Star Names (WGSN) to catalog and standardize proper names for stars. The WGSN's first bulletin of July 2016 included a table of the first two batches of names approved by the WGSN; which included Errai for Gamma Cephei A.

In July 2014 the International Astronomical Union launched NameExoWorlds, a process for giving proper names to certain exoplanets. The process involved public nomination and voting for the new names. In December 2015, the IAU announced the winning name was Tadmor for this planet. It was submitted by the Syrian Astronomical Association and is the ancient Semitic name and modern Arabic name for the city of Palmyra, a World Heritage Site.

In Chinese, the star is named 少衛增八 (Shàowèi Zēng Bā, literally, the 8th added star of the Xingguan Shaowei, Shaowei: the Minor Guard) belonging to the Left Wall of the Purple Forbidden enclosure (紫微左垣, Zǐwēi Zuǒyuán), which refers to an asterism consisting of Gamma Cephei, Iota Draconis, Theta Draconis, Eta Draconis, Zeta Draconis, Upsilon Draconis, 73 Draconis and 23 Cassiopeiae.

== Planetary system ==
A planet orbiting Gamma Cephei A with a 2.7-year period was discovered in 1988. Its existence was also announced in 1989. This was the first-discovered extrasolar planet and its ostensible discovery was based on the same radial velocity technique later used successfully by others. However, the claim was challenged in 1992 by a paper which favoured K-giant variability with a period equal to the stellar rotation, but in 2002, the existence of a planet with an orbital period of about 2.5 years was confirmed.

The secondary star B orbits A at only 9.8 times the semimajor axis of A's planet. The orbit of the planet is roughly perpendicular to the orbit of the binary. Dynamical modelling suggests that the Kozai–Lidov mechanism is at play here.

The Gamma Cephei A planetary system
Companion (in order from star)	Mass	Semimajor axis (AU)	Orbital period (years)	Eccentricity	Inclination (°)	Radius
b (Tadmor)	≥1.62±0.04 M_{J}	1.978±0.007	2.475±0.002	0.07±0.03	—	—

Preceded by Polaris	Pole Star; 3000–5200	Succeeded by Iota Cephei
