= Kappa Coronae Borealis b =

Extrasolar planet in the constellation Corona Borealis

Discovery
- Discovered by: Johnson et al.
- Discovery site: Lick Observatory
- Discovery date: 2007
- Detection method: Doppler spectroscopy

Orbital characteristics
- Semi-major axis: 2.65±0.13 AU
- Eccentricity: 0.167±0.032
- Orbital period (sidereal): 1285±14 d
- Time of perihelion: 2456830±51 JD
- Argument of perihelion: 194±14 º
- Semi-amplitude: 26.18±0.86 m/s
- Star: Kappa Coronae Borealis

Physical characteristics
- Mass: ≥1.811±0.057 M_{J}

Kappa Coronae Borealis b is an extrasolar planet approximately 98 light-years away in the constellation of Corona Borealis. This planet was discovered by Johnson et al., who used the radial velocity method to detect wobbling of the star caused by a planet move around by its tug of gravity. It was first discovered in September 2007 and was published in November.

The planet is 1.8 Jupiter masses, or 570 Earth masses, although only the minimum mass is known since the inclination is not known. It orbits at a distance of 2.7 astronomical units, or 400 gigameters, and takes 1,208 days, or 3.307 years, to orbit around Kappa Coronae Borealis.

== See also ==
- HD 16175 b
- HD 167042 b
- Rho Coronae Borealis b
