= HD 167042 b =

Extrasolar planet in the constellation Draco

Discovery
- Discovered by: Johnson "et al."
- Discovery site: Lick Observatory
- Discovery date: Sept 20, 2007 published Oct 22, 2007
- Detection method: radial velocity

Orbital characteristics
- Apastron: 1.34 AU (200,000,000 km)
- Periastron: 1.26 AU (188,000,000 km)
- Semi-major axis: 1.30 AU (194,000,000 km)
- Eccentricity: 0.027±0.04
- Orbital period (sidereal): 412.6±4 d 1.130 y
- Average orbital speed: 34.4
- Time of periastron: 2453330±120
- Argument of periastron: 34±40
- Semi-amplitude: 29.7
- Star: HD 167042

HD 167042 b is a gas giant extrasolar planet located approximately 163 light-years away in the constellation of Draco, orbiting the star HD 167042. The mass 1.7 M_{J} is only minimum since the inclination of the orbital plane is unknown. As it is typical for most known extrasolar planets, it orbits less than 3 AU from the parent star, hence taking less than 2,000 days (5.5 years) to revolve. For this planet, it orbits at 1.30 AU and taking 413 days to revolve around the star. Unlike most exoplanets, the eccentricity of the orbit is low, only 3%.

This planet was discovered in 2007 on September 20 and published on March 1. This planet was typical as it was discovered spectroscopically using the radial velocity method.

== See also ==
- HD 16175 b
- Kappa Coronae Borealis b
