= Upsilon Draconis =

Binary star system in the constellation Draco

- Location of υ Draconis (circled in red)

Observation data Epoch J2000.0 Equinox J2000.0 (ICRS)
- Constellation: Draco
- Right ascension: 18^{h} 54^{m} 23.85632^{s}
- Declination: +71° 17′ 49.8906″
- Apparent magnitude (V): 4.827

Characteristics
- Spectral type: K0 III
- U−B color index: +1.10
- B−V color index: +1.15

Astrometry
Radial velocity (R_{v})	−11.1 km/s
Proper motion (μ)	RA: +49.53 mas/yr Dec.: +42.11 mas/yr
Parallax (π)	9.48±0.45 mas
Distance	340 ± 20 ly (105 ± 5 pc)
Absolute bolometric magnitude (M_{bol})	−0.70

Orbit
Period (P)	258.48 d
Eccentricity (e)	0.21
Periastron epoch (T)	2441977.5 JD
Argument of periastron (ω) (secondary)	298°
Semi-amplitude (K_{1}) (primary)	6.0 km/s

Details
Mass	2.05 M_{☉}
Radius	19 R_{☉}
Luminosity	170 L_{☉}
Surface gravity (log g)	2.53 cgs
Temperature	4,561±61 K
Metallicity [Fe/H]	+0.01 dex
Age	1.37 Gyr

Other designations
- υ Dra, 52 Dra, BD+71°915, HD 176524, HIP 92782, HR 7180, SAO 9283

Database references
SIMBAD	data

Upsilon Draconis (υ Dra) is a binary star system in the northern circumpolar constellation of Draco. It is faintly visible to the naked eye with an apparent visual magnitude of 4.83. Based upon an annual parallax shift of 9.48 mas as measured from Earth, it is located around 340 light years (104 parsecs) from the Sun. At that distance, the visual magnitude of the star is diminished by an extinction factor of 0.02 due to interstellar dust.

In Chinese, 紫微左垣 (Zǐ Wēi Zuǒ Yuán), meaning Left Wall of Purple Forbidden Enclosure, refers to an asterism consisting of υ Draconis, ι Draconis, η Draconis, ζ Draconis, θ Draconis, 73 Draconis, γ Cephei and 23 Cassiopeiae.

This is a single-lined spectroscopic binary star system with an orbital period of 258.48 days and an eccentricity of 0.21. The primary, component A, is an evolved K-type giant star with a stellar classification of K0 III. It is a suspected barium star, which may indicate the orbiting companion, component B, is a white dwarf star.

The measured angular diameter of the primary, after correction for limb darkening, is 1.69±0.02 mas. At the estimated distance of Upsilon Draconis, this yields a physical size of about 19 times the Sun's radius. It is about 1.37 billion years old with an estimated 2.05 times the mass of the Sun. The star is radiating 170 times the solar luminosity from its photosphere at an effective temperature of 4,561 K.
