= Kepler-56c =

Hot Jupiter orbiting Kepler-56

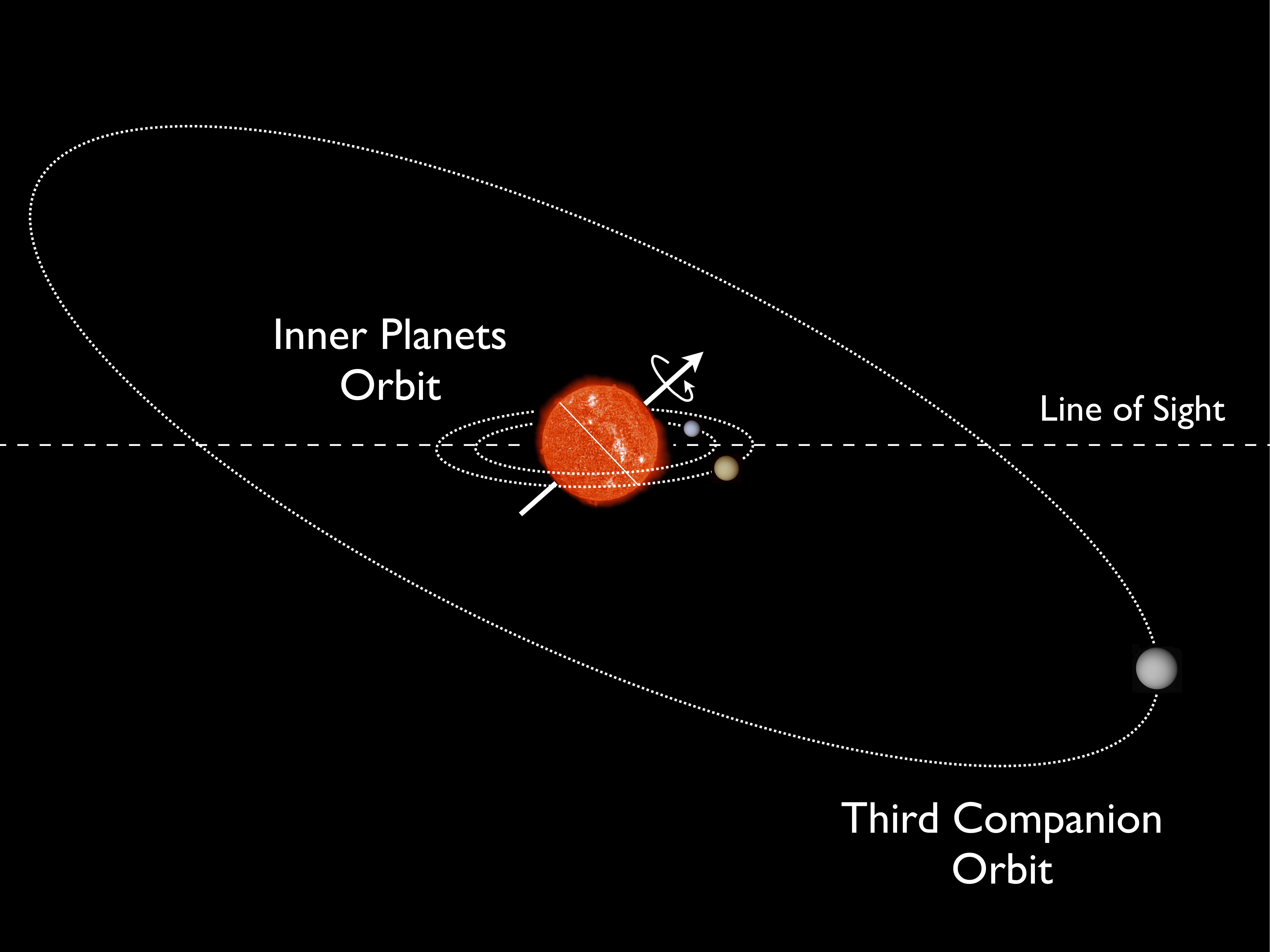
- A diagram of the planetary system of Kepler-56

Discovery
- Discovered by: Daniel Huber et al.
- Discovery date: 16 October 2013
- Detection method: Transit method

Orbital characteristics
- Semi-major axis: 0.1652 ± 0.0059 AU (24,710,000 ± 880,000 km)
- Orbital period (sidereal): 21.40239+0.00059 −0.00062 d
- Star: Kepler-56

Physical characteristics
- Mean radius: 9.80 ± 0.46 R_{🜨}
- Mass: 181+21 −19 M_{🜨}
- Mean density: 1.06+0.14 −0.13 g cm^{−3}

Kepler-56c is a hot Jupiter (a class of exoplanets) orbiting the star Kepler-56, located in the constellation Cygnus. It was discovered by the Kepler telescope in October 2013. It orbits its parent star only 0.17 AU (16 million mi; 25 million km) away; at its distance, it completes an orbit once every 21.4 days. Its orbit is significantly misaligned with its parent star's equator. Further studies have revealed that a third planet, 56d, is responsible for misaligning the orbits of both planets.

Both Kepler-56b and Kepler-56c will be devoured by their parent star in about 130 and 155 million years, respectively. Further research shows that it will have its atmosphere boiled away by intense heat from the star, and it will be stretched by the strengthening stellar tides.
