= Zeta Draconis =

Binary star in the constellation Draco

ζ Draconis
- Location of ζ Draconis (circled)

Observation data Epoch J2000 Equinox ICRS
- Constellation: Draco
- Right ascension: 17^{h} 08^{m} 47.19596^{s}
- Declination: +65° 42′ 52.8634″
- Apparent magnitude (V): +3.17

Characteristics
- Spectral type: B6 III
- U−B color index: −0.43
- B−V color index: −0.11

Astrometry
Radial velocity (R_{v})	−17 km/s
Proper motion (μ)	RA: –20.43 mas/yr Dec.: +19.61 mas/yr
Parallax (π)	9.93±0.35 mas
Distance	330 ± 10 ly (101 ± 4 pc)
Absolute magnitude (M_{V})	−1.88

Details

A
Mass	5.940±1.134 M_{☉}
Radius	6.19±0.49 R_{☉}
Luminosity	883 L_{☉}
Surface gravity (log g)	4.24 cgs
Temperature	15,000±800 K
Metallicity [Fe/H]	−0.95 dex
Rotational velocity (v sin i)	55 km/s

B
Mass	3.645±0.770 M_{☉}

Other designations
- Aldhibah, 22 Draconis, BD+65 1170, FK5 639, HD 155763, HIP 83895, HR 6396, SAO 17365, WDS 17088+6543

Database references
SIMBAD	data

Zeta Draconis is a binary star system in the northern circumpolar constellation of Draco. Its name is a Bayer designation. With an apparent visual magnitude of +3.17, it is visible to the naked eye and is the fifth-brightest member of this generally faint constellation. Its distance from the Sun has been measured using the parallax technique, yielding an estimate of roughly 330 light-years (100 parsecs).

The two components are designated Zeta Draconis A (formally named Aldhibah /ælˈdaɪbə/, after the traditional name of the system) and B.

== Nomenclature ==
ζ Draconis (Latinised to Zeta Draconis) is the system's Bayer designation, which is abbreviated Zet Dra or ζ Dra. The designations of the two components as Zeta Draconis A and B derives from the convention used by the Washington Multiplicity Catalog (WMC) for multiple star systems, and adopted by the International Astronomical Union (IAU).

Zeta Draconis has the old Arabic name الذئب al-dhiʼb "the wolf" or "the hyena", given in its feminine form "Al Dhiʼbah" (ذئبة) in Allen (1899) (though he mistranslated it as plural "hyenas", which would be الضباع al-ḍibāʽ). It shares the dual form of the name, الذئبين al-dhiʼbayn, with Eta Draconis. It is also known as Nodus III (Third Knot, the knot being a loop in the tail of Draco).

In 2016, the IAU organized a Working Group on Star Names (WGSN) to catalog and standardize proper names for stars. The WGSN decided to attribute proper names to individual stars rather than entire multiple systems. It approved the name Aldhibah for the component Zeta Draconis A on 5 September 2017. It also approved the name Athebyne for Eta Draconis A on the same date. Both are now so included in the List of IAU-approved Star Names.

In Chinese, 紫微左垣 (Zǐ Wēi Zuǒ Yuán), meaning Left Wall of Purple Forbidden Enclosure, refers to an asterism consisting of Zeta Draconis, Iota Draconis, Eta Draconis, Theta Draconis, Upsilon Draconis, 73 Draconis, Gamma Cephei and 23 Cassiopeiae. Consequently, the Chinese name for Zeta Draconis itself is 紫微左垣四 (Zǐ Wēi Zuǒ Yuán sì, English: the Fourth Star of Left Wall of Purple Forbidden Enclosure), representing 上弼 (Shǎngbì), meaning The First Minister. 上弼 (Shǎngbì) is westernized into Shang Pih by R.H. Allen with meaning "the Higher Minister".

== Properties ==
Zeta Draconis A is a giant star with a stellar classification of B6 III. Compared to the Sun, this star is about six times larger and more massive, and is radiating 880 times as much luminosity. This energy is being emitted from the star's outer envelope at an effective temperature of nearly 13,400 K. The azimuthal rotation velocity along the equator is at least 55 km/s.

The north ecliptic pole is located at right ascension 18^{h} and declination +66.5°. This is located roughly midway between Delta Draconis and Zeta Draconis. The north ecliptic pole almost coincides with the south celestial pole of Venus; Zeta Draconis is also the north pole star of Jupiter.
