= HD 139357 =

K-type giant star in the constellation Draco

Observation data Epoch J2000.0 Equinox ICRS
- Constellation: Draco
- Right ascension: 15^{h} 35^{m} 16.19859^{s}
- Declination: +53° 55′ 19.7094″
- Apparent magnitude (V): 5.97

Characteristics
- Evolutionary stage: red giant branch
- Spectral type: K4III
- B−V color index: 1.184±0.006

Astrometry
Radial velocity (R_{v})	−8.53±0.13 km/s
Proper motion (μ)	RA: −18.845±0.051 mas/yr Dec.: 2.097±0.063 mas/yr
Parallax (π)	8.8114±0.0460 mas
Distance	370 ± 2 ly (113.5 ± 0.6 pc)
Absolute magnitude (M_{V})	0.61

Details
Mass	1.1±0.1 M_{☉} 1.35±0.24 M_{☉} 2.16±0.18 M_{☉}
Radius	11.47±0.75 R_{☉} 14.4±0.4 R_{☉}
Luminosity	74±1 L_{☉}
Surface gravity (log g)	2.2±0.1 cgs 2.63±0.10 cgs 2.9±0.15 cgs
Temperature	4,601±28 K
Metallicity [Fe/H]	−0.13±0.05 dex 0.34±0.05 dex
Age	1.19±0.33 Gyr; 3.07±1.47 Gyr; 7.20±1.80 Gyr

Other designations
- BD+54°1756, GC 20977, HD 139357, HIP 76311, HR 5811, SAO 29583, PPM 35043, GCRV 9003

Database references
SIMBAD	data
Exoplanet Archive	data

HD 139357 is a 6th magnitude K-type giant star located approximately 370 light years from Earth, visible in the constellation Draco. Its mass is four thirds that of the Sun but its radius is 11.47 times larger. However, despite being a giant star, it is only 3.07 billion years old, which is younger than the Sun.

It hosts a substellar companion with a minimum mass of 9.76 M_{J}, discovered in 2009. A 2022 study estimated the true mass of HD 139357 b at about 16.38 M_{J} via astrometry, although this estimate is poorly constrained. If this is the true mass, the object would be a brown dwarf.

The HD 139357 planetary system
Companion (in order from star)	Mass	Semimajor axis (AU)	Orbital period (days)	Eccentricity	Inclination (°)	Radius
b	≥9.76 ± 2.15 M_{J}	2.36 ± 0.02	1125.7 ± 9	0.10 ± 0.02	—	—

== See also ==
- 42 Draconis
- Iota Draconis
- List of extrasolar planets
