= Theta Draconis =

Binary star system in the constellation Draco

θ Draconis
- Location of θ Draconis (circled)

Observation data Epoch J2000 Equinox ICRS
- Constellation: Draco
- Right ascension: 16^{h} 01^{m} 53.34636^{s}
- Declination: +58° 33′ 54.9056″
- Apparent magnitude (V): 4.000

Characteristics
- Spectral type: F9 V or F8IV-V
- U−B color index: +0.11
- B−V color index: +0.528±0.013

Astrometry
Radial velocity (R_{v})	−8.23±0.20 km/s
Proper motion (μ)	RA: −319.51 mas/yr Dec.: 334.97 mas/yr
Parallax (π)	47.54±0.12 mas
Distance	68.6 ± 0.2 ly (21.03 ± 0.05 pc)
Absolute magnitude (M_{V})	2.39

Orbit
Period (P)	3.0708216±0.0000069 d
Semi-major axis (a)	~0.048 AU (10 R_{☉})
Eccentricity (e)	0.039±0.012
Periastron epoch (T)	5,971.98±0.13
Argument of periastron (ω) (secondary)	63±15°
Semi-amplitude (K_{1}) (primary)	25.10±0.31 km/s
Semi-amplitude (K_{2}) (secondary)	66.0±2.2 km/s

Details

A
Mass	1.53 M_{☉} 1.2±0.1 M_{☉} 1.18 M_{☉}
Radius	2.83+0.12 −0.05 R_{☉}
Luminosity	9.998±0.137 L_{☉}
Surface gravity (log g)	3.79 cgs
Temperature	6,105+53 −129 K
Metallicity [Fe/H]	+0.19 dex
Rotational velocity (v sin i)	30.7 km/s
Age	2.03 Gyr

B
Mass	0.46±0.04 M_{☉} 0.21 M_{☉}

Other designations
- θ Dra, 13 Her, BD+58°1608, FK5 598, HD 144284, HIP 78527, HR 5986, SAO 29765

Database references
SIMBAD	data

Theta Draconis, a name Latinized from θ Draconis, is a binary star system in the northern circumpolar constellation of Draco. It is faintly visible to the naked eye at night with an apparent visual magnitude of almost exactly 4. Parallax measurements place it at an estimated distance of 68.6 light-years (21.0 parsecs) from the Sun, and it is drifting closer with a radial velocity of −8 km/s. It has a relatively high proper motion, traversing the celestial sphere at the rate of 0.464″ per year. O. J. Eggen included this star as a member of the NGC 1901 supercluster based on its space motion.

The binary nature of this system was discovered by W. W. Campbell in 1899, and the first set of orbital elements was published by H. D. Curtis in 1907. It is a single-lined spectroscopic binary in a close orbit with a period of 3.07 days and an eccentricity (ovalness) of 0.04. The secondary component has been resolved in the infrared H band, allowing an estimation of the mass ratio as 0.38±0.03. Some velocity variation of K_{1} was observed by M. Mayor and T. Mazeh in 1987, which is suggestive of a tertiary component to the system.

The primary component is a solar-type star that at various times has been assigned stellar classifications of F9 V and F8IV-V. The star is about two billion years old and is spinning with a projected rotational velocity of 31 km/s. It has a high metallicity (heavy element abundances) with around 20% more mass than the Sun and nearly three times the Sun's radius. The star displays no chromospheric emission and may be on or entering the subgiant stage. Because of the close orbit, it could be filling up to 60% of its Roche lobe. The star is radiating ten times the luminosity of the Sun from its photosphere at an effective temperature of 6,105 K.

== Chinese name ==
In Chinese, 紫微左垣 (Zǐ Wēi Zuǒ Yuán), meaning Left Wall of Purple Forbidden Enclosure, refers to an asterism consisting of θ Draconis, ι Draconis, η Draconis, ζ Draconis, υ Draconis, 73 Draconis, γ Cephei and 23 Cassiopeiae. Consequently, the Chinese name for θ Draconis itself is 紫微左垣二 (Zǐ Wēi Zuǒ Yuán èr, English: the Second Star of Left Wall of Purple Forbidden Enclosure.), representing 上宰 (Shǎngzǎi), meaning The First Premier. 上宰 (Shǎngzǎi) is westernized into Shang Tsae by R.H. Allen with meaning "the Minor Steward" but it was for η Dra (Aldibain).
