= Xi Aquilae b =

Extrasolar planet in the constellation Aquila

Xi Aquilae b / Fortitudo
Discovery
- Discovered by: Sato et al.
- Discovery site: Okayama Planet Search Program, Japan
- Discovery date: 19 February 2008
- Detection method: Radial velocity

Orbital characteristics
- Semi-major axis: 0.68 AU (102 million km)
- Eccentricity: 0
- Orbital period (sidereal): 136.75 ± 0.25 d 0.37439 y
- Time of periastron: 2,453,001.7 ± 1.4
- Star: Xi Aquilae

Physical characteristics
- Mass: ≥2.0 and <37.1 M_{J}

Xi Aquilae b (abbreviated ξ Aquilae b, ξ Aql b), formally named Fortitudo /fɔːrtɪˈtjuːdoʊ/, is an extrasolar planet approximately 184 light-years from the Sun in the constellation of Aquila. The planet was discovered orbiting the yellow giant star Xi Aquilae in 2008. The planet has a minimum mass of 2.8 Jupiters and a period of 137 days.

== Name ==
Following its discovery the planet was designated Xi Aquilae b. In July 2014 the International Astronomical Union (IAU) launched NameExoWorlds, a process for giving proper names to certain exoplanets and their host stars. The process involved public nomination and voting for the new names. In December 2015, the IAU announced the winning name was Fortitudo for this planet.

The winning name was submitted by Libertyer, a student club at Hosei University of Tokyo, Japan. Fortitudo is Latin for 'fortitude'. Aquila is Latin for 'eagle', a symbol of fortitude—emotional and mental strength in the face of adversity.

== See also ==
- 18 Delphini b
- 41 Lyncis b
