= HD 104985 b =

Exoplanet orbiting the yellow giant HD 104985

HD 104985 b / Meztli
Discovery
- Discovered by: Sato et al.
- Discovery site: Okayama Planet; Search Program; Japan
- Discovery date: June 26, 2003
- Detection method: radial velocity

Orbital characteristics
- Apastron: 0.80 AU (120,000,000 km)
- Periastron: 0.76 AU (114,000,000 km)
- Semi-major axis: 0.78 AU (117,000,000 km)
- Eccentricity: 0.03 ± 0.02
- Orbital period (sidereal): 198.2 ± 0.3 d 0.5426 ± 0.0008 y
- Average orbital speed: 43
- Time of periastron: 2451990 ± 20
- Argument of periastron: 310 ± 30
- Semi-amplitude: 161 ± 2
- Star: HD 104985

HD 104985 b, also named Meztli /ˈmɛstli/, is an extrasolar planet approximately 97 parsecs (317 lys) from the Sun. The 198-day period planet orbits the yellow giant star HD 104985 (Tonatiuh) at a distance of 0.78 AU. With a mass 6^{1}/_{3} times Jupiter it is a gas giant.

Following its discovery in 2003 the planet was designated HD 104985 b. In July 2014 the International Astronomical Union launched NameExoWorlds, a process for giving proper names to certain exoplanets and their host stars. The process involved public nomination and voting for the new names. In December 2015, the IAU announced the winning name was Meztli for this planet. The winning name was submitted by the Sociedad Astronomica Urania of Morelos, Mexico. 'Meztli' was the Aztec goddess of the Moon.
