= 41 Lyncis b =

Extrasolar planet orbiting the star 41 Lyncis

41 Lyncis b / Arkas
Discovery
- Discovered by: Sato et al.
- Discovery site: Okayama Planet; Search Program, Japan
- Discovery date: February 19, 2008
- Detection method: radial velocity

Designations
- Alternative names: Arkas

Orbital characteristics
- Semi-major axis: 0.648 AU (96.9 million km)
- Eccentricity: 0.040+0.022 −0.031
- Orbital period (sidereal): 183.93±0.09 d
- Time of periastron: 2454354.4+80.2 −16.9 JD
- Semi-amplitude: 56.42+1.87 −1.88 m/s
- Star: 41 Lyncis

Physical characteristics
- Mass: ≥1.654+0.054 −0.055 M_{J}

41 Lyncis b (abbreviated 41 Lyn b), also designated HD 81688 b and named Arkas /ˈɑːrkəs/, is a candidate exoplanet approximately 276 light-years from Earth in the constellation of Ursa Major.

A gas giant with a mass of 1.654 times that of Jupiter, it orbits the K-type star 41 Lyncis with an orbital period of 183.93 days (corresponding to a semi-major axis of 0.648 AU). It was discovered and announced by Bun'ei Sato on February 19, 2008.

== Name ==
In July 2014, the International Astronomical Union (IAU) launched NameExoWorlds, a process for giving proper names to certain exoplanets and their host stars. The process involved public nomination and voting for the new names. In December 2015, the IAU announced the name Arkas for this planet. The winning name was submitted by the Okayama Astro Club of Japan. Arkas was the son of Callisto (Ursa Major) in Greek mythology.

== Planet challenged ==
A 2023 study of planets around evolved stars, while presenting updated parameters for this planet, found that the radial velocity variations are correlated with stellar activity signals, casting doubt on the planet's existence. Based on this, a 2024 study listed it as one of several doubtful planets around giant stars (along with the other named planets 14 Andromedae b and 42 Draconis b).

== See also ==
- 18 Delphini b
- Xi Aquilae b
