= 81 Ceti b =

Extrasolar planet in the constellation Cetus

Discovery
- Discovered by: Sato et al.
- Discovery date: July 2, 2008
- Detection method: Doppler Spectroscopy

Orbital characteristics
- Semi-major axis: 2.5 AU (370,000,000 km)
- Eccentricity: 0.206 ± 0.029
- Orbital period (sidereal): 952.7 ± 8.8 d
- Time of periastron: 2486 ± 26
- Argument of periastron: 175 ± 69
- Star: 81 Ceti

Physical characteristics
- Mean radius: 1.14 R_{J} Estimate
- Mass: 5.30 M_{J}

81 Ceti b (abbreviated 81 Cet b) is an extrasolar planet approximately 331 light years away in the constellation of Cetus. It is estimated to be 5.3 times the mass of Jupiter which also makes it a gas giant. It orbits the K-type giant star 81 Ceti at an average distance of 2.5 AU, taking about 2.6 years to revolve with an eccentricity of 0.206.

== Discovery ==
The preprint announcing this planet was submitted to the arXiv electronic repository on July 2, 2008, by Bun'ei Sato and collaborators, who discovered it using the Doppler Spectroscopy method, during the Okayama Planet Search radial velocity survey of G and K giants at Okayama Astrophysical Observatory.

== See also ==
- 14 Andromedae b
- 6 Lyncis b
- 79 Ceti b
- 94 Ceti b
