= 14 Andromedae b =

Extrasolar planet in Andromeda constellation

14 Andromedae b / Spe
- Radial velocity changes over time of 14 Andromedae caused by the orbit of 14 Andromedae b.

Discovery
- Discovered by: Sato et al.
- Discovery site: Okayama Planet; Search Program
- Discovery date: July 2, 2008
- Detection method: Doppler Spectroscopy

Designations
- Named after: "spe" from latin "spes" meaning hope
- Alternative names: Spe

Orbital characteristics
- Semi-major axis: 0.775 AU (115,900,000 km)
- Eccentricity: 0.0094
- Orbital period (sidereal): 186.76+0.11 −0.12 d
- Time of periastron: 2452853.0±2.1
- Semi-amplitude: 86.08+2.76 −2.95 m/s
- Star: 14 Andromedae

Physical characteristics
- Mass: ≥3.559+0.114 −0.122 M_{J}

14 Andromedae b (abbreviated 14 And b), formally named Spe /ˈspiː/, is a candidate exoplanet approximately 248 light-years away in the constellation of Andromeda.

The 186-day period planet orbits about 83% the Earth–Sun distance from the giant star 14 Andromedae. It has a minimum mass of 3.559 times the mass of Jupiter. The planet orbits with an eccentricity of 0.0094, which means the orbital distance over the course of its revolution varies by only 0.02 AU.

== Nomenclature ==
In July 2014 the International Astronomical Union launched NameExoWorlds, a process for giving proper names to certain exoplanets and their host stars. The process involved public nomination and voting for the new names. In December 2015, the IAU announced the name Spe for this planet. The winning name was based on that submitted by the Thunder Bay Centre of the Royal Astronomical Society of Canada); namely 'Spes', Latin for 'hope'. (Spes was also the Roman goddess of hope.) The IAU substituted the ablative form 'Spe', which means 'where there is hope', to match that given to the host star at the same time.

== Discovery ==
The preprint announcing 14 Andromedae b was submitted to the arXiv electronic repository on July 2, 2008, by Bun'ei Sato and collaborators, who discovered it using the Doppler Spectroscopy method, during the Okayama Planet Search radial velocity survey of G and K giants at Okayama Astrophysical Observatory.

== Planet challenged ==
A 2023 study of planets around evolved stars, while presenting updated parameters for this planet, found that the radial velocity variations are correlated with stellar activity signals, casting doubt on the planet's existence. Based on this, a 2024 study listed it as one of several doubtful planets around giant stars (along with the other named planets 41 Lyncis b and 42 Draconis b).

== See also ==
- 81 Ceti b
- 6 Lyncis b
