= 18 Delphini b =

Extrasolar planet in the constellation Delphinus

18 Delphini b / Arion
- Radial velocity changes over time of 18 Delphini caused by the orbit of 18 Delphini b.

Discovery
- Discovered by: Sato et al.
- Discovery site: Okayama Planet; Search Program; Japan
- Discovery date: 19 February 2008
- Detection method: radial velocity

Orbital characteristics
- Semi-major axis: 2.476 AU (370,400,000 km)
- Eccentricity: 0.08 ± 0.01
- Orbital period (sidereal): 993.3 ± 3.2 d 2.719 y
- Time of periastron: 2451672 ± 18
- Argument of periastron: 166.1 ± 6.5
- Star: 18 Delphini

Physical characteristics
- Mass: 9.207

18 Delphini b (abbreviated 18 Del b), formally named Arion /əˈraɪən/, is an extrasolar planet approximately 245 light-years away in the constellation of Delphinus.

The 993-day period planet orbits the Red clump star 18 Delphini 2.476 AU away every 2.719 years. It is a very massive and dense planet with a mass of 9.207 M_{J}, it was discovered on February 19, 2008, by Bun'ei Sato.

In July 2014, the International Astronomical Union launched NameExoWorlds, a process for giving proper names to certain exoplanets and their host stars. The process involved public nomination and voting for the new names. In December 2015, the IAU announced the name Arion for this planet. The winning name was submitted by the Tokushima Prefectural Jonan High School Science Club of Japan. Arion was a genius of poetry and music in ancient Greece. According to legend, his life was saved at sea by dolphins after attracting their attention by the playing of his kithara ('Delphinus' is Latin for 'dolphin').

== See also ==
- 41 Lyncis b
- Xi Aquilae b
