= 6 Lyncis b =

Exoplanet orbiting the star 6 Lyncis

- Radial velocity changes over time of 6 Lyncis caused by the orbit of 6 Lyncis b.

Discovery
- Discovered by: Sato et al.
- Discovery site: Okayama Astrophysical Observatory
- Discovery date: 2008
- Detection method: Doppler spectroscopy

Orbital characteristics
- Semi-major axis: 2.11±0.11 AU
- Eccentricity: 0.073±0.036
- Orbital period (sidereal): 934.3±8.6 d
- Time of perihelion: 2455384±94 JD
- Argument of perihelion: 130±38 º
- Semi-amplitude: 32.8±1.2 m/s
- Star: 6 Lyncis

Physical characteristics
- Mean radius: 1.209 R_{J}
- Mass: ≥2.010±0.077 M_{J}

6 Lyncis b (abbreviated 6 Lyn b) is an extrasolar planet orbiting the K-type subgiant star 6 Lyncis which is approximately 182 light years away in the constellation Lynx. The planet has a minimum mass 2.4 M_{J}. The orbital period for this planet is 899 days, or 2.46 years. The orbital radius for this planet is 2.2 AU, periastron 1.9 AU, and apastron 2.5 AU, corresponding to the orbital eccentricity of 0.134. This planet was discovered on July 3, 2008 by Sato et al., who used Doppler spectroscopy to find variations of the line of sight motion of the star caused by the planet’s gravity during its orbit.

== See also ==
- 14 Andromedae b
- 41 Lyncis b
- 81 Ceti b
