= HD 167042 =

Star in the constellation Draco

- Location of HD 167042 (circled in red)

Observation data Epoch J2000.0 Equinox J2000.0 (ICRS)
- Constellation: Draco
- Right ascension: 18^{h} 10^{m} 31.640^{s}
- Declination: +54° 17′ 11.59″
- Apparent magnitude (V): +5.97

Characteristics
- Evolutionary stage: red giant branch
- Spectral type: K1 III or K1 IV
- U−B color index: +0.716
- B−V color index: +0.934

Astrometry
Radial velocity (R_{v})	−17.88 km/s
Proper motion (μ)	RA: +107.630 mas/yr Dec.: +247.345 mas/yr
Parallax (π)	20.1313±0.0293 mas
Distance	162.0 ± 0.2 ly (49.67 ± 0.07 pc)
Absolute magnitude (M_{V})	2.48

Details
Mass	1.4696±0.0532 M_{☉}
Radius	4.4947±0.0576 R_{☉}
Luminosity	10.717+0.924 −0.850 L_{☉}
Surface gravity (log g)	3.3008±0.0050 cgs
Temperature	4,926±79 K
Metallicity [Fe/H]	+0.093±0.061 dex
Rotational velocity (v sin i)	0.68 km/s
Age	7.413±0.829 Gyr

Other designations
- BD+54°1950, GC 24820, HD 167042, HIP 89017, HR 6817, SAO 30784, PPM 36415, LTT 15382, Wolf 1415

Database references
SIMBAD	data
Exoplanet Archive	data

HD 167042 is a star with an orbiting exoplanet in the northern constellation of Draco. With an apparent visual magnitude of +5.97, the star is dimly visible to the naked eye. It is located at a distance of 162 light years based on parallax measurements, but it is drifting closer with a radial velocity of −18 km/s. HD 167042 has a relatively large proper motion, traversing the celestial sphere at an angular rate of 0.270″ yr^{−1}.

The spectrum of HD 167042 presents as an evolved K-type giant star, an orange giant, with a stellar classification of K1 III. The position of this star on the H-R diagram is at the base of the red giant branch. When this star was a main sequence, it was white-hued mid to late A-type star based on its mass. It shows no significant magnetic activity in its chromosphere. The star has 1.88 times the mass of the Sun and has expanded to 4.49 times the Sun's radius. It is radiating 10.7 times the luminosity of the Sun from its photosphere at an effective temperature of 4,926 K.

== Planetary system ==
On 28 November 2007, a preprint of the discovery of the exoplanet HD 167042 b was posted to the arXiv server. The peer reviewed paper was then published in The Astrophysical Journal on 1 March 2008. The discovery was later independently confirmed. There is a long-period radial velocity trend, which might indicate the presence of a second substellar companion.

The HD 167042 planetary system
Companion (in order from star)	Mass	Semimajor axis (AU)	Orbital period (days)	Eccentricity	Inclination (°)	Radius
b	≥1.397+0.031 −0.044 M_{J}	1.220±0.001	417.67+0.43 −0.41	0.010+0.033 −0.004	—	—

== See also ==
- HD 16175
- Kappa Coronae Borealis
- List of extrasolar planets
