= 18 Delphini =

Star in the constellation Delphinus

18 Delphini / Musica
- Location of 18 Delphini (circled in red)

Observation data Epoch J2000 Equinox J2000
- Constellation: Delphinus
- Right ascension: 20^{h} 58^{m} 25.93353^{s}
- Declination: +10° 50′ 21.4309″
- Apparent magnitude (V): 5.506

Characteristics
- Evolutionary stage: red clump
- Spectral type: G6III
- B−V color index: 0.934±0.004

Astrometry
Radial velocity (R_{v})	+4.17±0.12 km/s
Proper motion (μ)	RA: −49.921 mas/yr Dec.: −34.509 mas/yr
Parallax (π)	13.3021±0.0652 mas
Distance	245 ± 1 ly (75.2 ± 0.4 pc)
Absolute magnitude (M_{V})	1.15

Details
Mass	2.35±0.07 M_{☉}
Radius	7.19±0.38 R_{☉}
Luminosity	33.9+6.9 −5.7 L_{☉}
Surface gravity (log g)	3.00±0.04 cgs
Temperature	5,071±10 K
Metallicity [Fe/H]	0.10±0.02 dex
Rotational velocity (v sin i)	1.60±0.45 km/s
Age	690±50 Myr

Other designations
- Musica, 18 Del, BD+10°4425, GC 29266, HD 199665, HIP 103527, HR 8030, SAO 106712, WDS J20584+1050A

Database references
SIMBAD	A
- B
Exoplanet Archive	data

18 Delphini, also named Musica /ˈmjuːzɪkə/, is a binary star in the constellation of Delphinus of the low northern hemisphere. The primary has a Sun-like golden hue and is faintly visible to the naked eye with an apparent visual magnitude of 5.506. It has a red dwarf companion at a wide separation. The star is located at a distance of approximately 245 light-years from the Sun based on parallax, and it is drifting further away with a radial velocity of +4 km/s. An object believed to be an extrasolar planet (designated 18 Delphini b or Arion) orbits the primary star.

== Nomenclature ==
18 Delphini is the star's Flamsteed designation, abbreviated 18 Del. Following its discovery the planet was designated 18 Delphini b.

As part of the NameExoWorlds program by the International Astronomical Union, in 2015 the name Musica, Latin for 'music', was selected for this star by Tokushima Prefectural Jonan High School Science Club of Japan. The planet was given the name Arion, after a genius of poetry and music in ancient Greece. According to legend, his life was saved at sea by dolphins after attracting their attention by the playing of his kithara. The constellation 'Delphinus' is Latin for 'dolphin'.

== Properties ==
The stellar classification of 18 Delphini is G6III, which means it is an evolved star that has cooled and expanded off the main sequence. It is a suspected red clump giant that is generating energy from core helium fusion. A moderate level of X-ray emission has been detected from this star, which suggests it has a mildly active chromosphere. The star is 650 million years old with more than double the mass of the Sun, and has expanded to seven times the Sun's radius. It is radiating 34 times the luminosity of the Sun from its photosphere at an effective temperature of 5,071 K.

The Washington Double Star Catalogue lists a pair of visual companions for this star. Component B is magnitude 9.88 and lies at an angular separation of 197.5 arcseconds along a position angle (PA) of 162° from the brighter star as of 2003. Component C has a magnitude of 12.77 with a separation of 129.3 arcseconds as of 2000. The proper motion of both stars are diverging significantly from 18 Delphini, so they can be ruled out as physical companions. However, a faint star located 29.2″ away appears to be a co-moving companion. This has a projected separation of 2,199 AU and a mass estimated as 19% that of the Sun. It is a small red dwarf star with a class of M4–5.

== Planetary system ==
On February 19, 2008, an extrasolar planet was found to be orbiting the star with a period of 2.720 years and a mild eccentricity (ovalness) of 0.08. The mass of this exoplanet is greater than 10 times the mass of Jupiter. There is a long-period radial velocity trend, which might indicate the presence of a second substellar companion.

The 18 Delphini planetary system
Companion (in order from star)	Mass	Semimajor axis (AU)	Orbital period (days)	Eccentricity	Inclination (°)	Radius
b (Arion)	≥9.207+0.160 −0.077 M_{J}	2.476±0.002	982.85+1.06 −0.92	0.024+0.007 −0.018	—	—
