= 41 Lyncis =

Star in the constellation Ursa Major

41 Lyncis / Intercrus
- Location of 41 Lyncis (circled)

Observation data Epoch J2000 Equinox ICRS
- Constellation: Ursa Major
- Pronunciation: /ˈɪntərkrʌs/,
- Right ascension: 09^{h} 28^{m} 39.98867^{s}
- Declination: +45° 36′ 05.3311″
- Apparent magnitude (V): 5.39

Characteristics
- Spectral type: K0 III
- U−B color index: 0.74
- B−V color index: 0.983

Astrometry
Radial velocity (R_{v})	+38.59±0.12 km/s
Proper motion (μ)	RA: −7.184 mas/yr Dec.: −129.318 mas/yr
Parallax (π)	11.8163±0.0623 mas
Distance	276 ± 1 ly (84.6 ± 0.4 pc)
Absolute magnitude (M_{V})	0.675

Details
Mass	1.07+0.27 −0.16 M_{☉}
Radius	11.13+1.58 −0.68 R_{☉}
Luminosity	60.30+14.76 −7.39 L_{☉}
Surface gravity (log g)	2.37+0.05 −0.07 cgs
Temperature	4,797 K
Metallicity [Fe/H]	−0.32±0.10 dex
Age	4.07±2.24 Gyr

Other designations
- Intercrus, 41 Lyn, BD+46 1509, GC 13051, HD 81688, HIP 46471, HR 3743, SAO 42876, CCDM J09287+4536A

Database references
SIMBAD	The star
- planet b
Exoplanet Archive	data

41 Lyncis (abbreviated 41 Lyn), also designated HD 81688 and named Intercrus /ˈɪntərkrʌs/, is a fifth-magnitude star located in the northern constellation of Ursa Major. An extrasolar planet (designated 41 Lyncis b or HD 81688 b, later named Arkas) is thought to be orbiting the star.

== Properties ==
It is estimated using parallax measurements to be approximately 276 light-years (85 parsecs) from the Sun. The spectrum of this star matches a stellar classification of K0 III, with the luminosity class of III suggesting it is a giant star. This star has about double the mass of the Sun, although a re-evaluation of evolutionary tracks published in 2011 gives a lower estimate of 1.1+0.3
−0.2 solar masses. It has expanded to 11 times the Sun's radius and is radiating 55 times as much as the Sun from its outer atmosphere at an effective temperature of 4,789 K. This temperature gives it the orange-hued glow of a K-type star.

This star is following an orbit through the Milky Way with an eccentricity of 0.21. This will take it as close to the Galactic Center as 18.5 kly (5.7 kpc) and as far as 28.2 kly (8.6 kpc). The inclination of this orbit will carry it as much as 1,800 ly (550 pc) away from the galactic plane. For this reason, it is uncertain whether this star is a member of the thin disk population.

41 Lyncis is listed in the Washington Double Star Catalog as having two visual companions, the 8th-magnitude F-type subgiant HD 81704 72″ away, and an 11th-magnitude star 84″ away. Both are background objects, more distant than 41 Lyncis itself, but the two share a common proper motion and are at the same distance as each other.

== Nomenclature ==
41 Lyncis is the Flamsteed designation. Typically, 'Lyncis' is the genitive for a star found in the constellation of Lynx. However, when the constellation boundaries were officially established by the International Astronomical Union (IAU) in 1930, this star was located within Ursa Major. HD 81688 is the entry in the Henry Draper Catalogue. Following its discovery the planet was designated 41 Lyncis b or alternatively HD 81688 b.

In July 2014 the IAU launched NameExoWorlds, a process for giving proper names to certain exoplanets and their host stars. The process involved public nomination and voting for the new names. In December 2015, the IAU announced the winning names were Intercrus for this star and Arkas for its planet. The winning names were those submitted by the Okayama Astro Club of Japan. Intercrus means "between the legs" in Latin style, referring to the star's position in the constellation Ursa Major. Arkas was the son of Callisto (Ursa Major) in Greek mythology.

The International Astronomical Union Working Group on Star Names (WGSN) has approved the proper name Intercrus for 41 Lyncis.

== Planetary system ==
On 19 February 2008 a planet was announced orbiting the star, detected by the radial velocity method. It has a minimum mass 2.7 times that of Jupiter and completes an orbit every 184 days.

A 2023 study of planets around evolved stars, while presenting updated parameters for this planet, found that the radial velocity variations are correlated with stellar activity signals, casting doubt on the planet's existence. Based on this, a 2024 study listed it as one of several doubtful planets around giant stars (along with other named planets around 14 Andromedae and 42 Draconis).

The 41 Lyncis planetary system
Companion (in order from star)	Mass	Semimajor axis (AU)	Orbital period (days)	Eccentricity	Inclination (°)	Radius
b (Arkas) (disputed)	≥1.654+0.054 −0.055 M_{J}	0.648	183.93±0.09	0.040+0.022 −0.031	—	—
