= Kepler-56 =

Red giant star in the constellation Cygnus

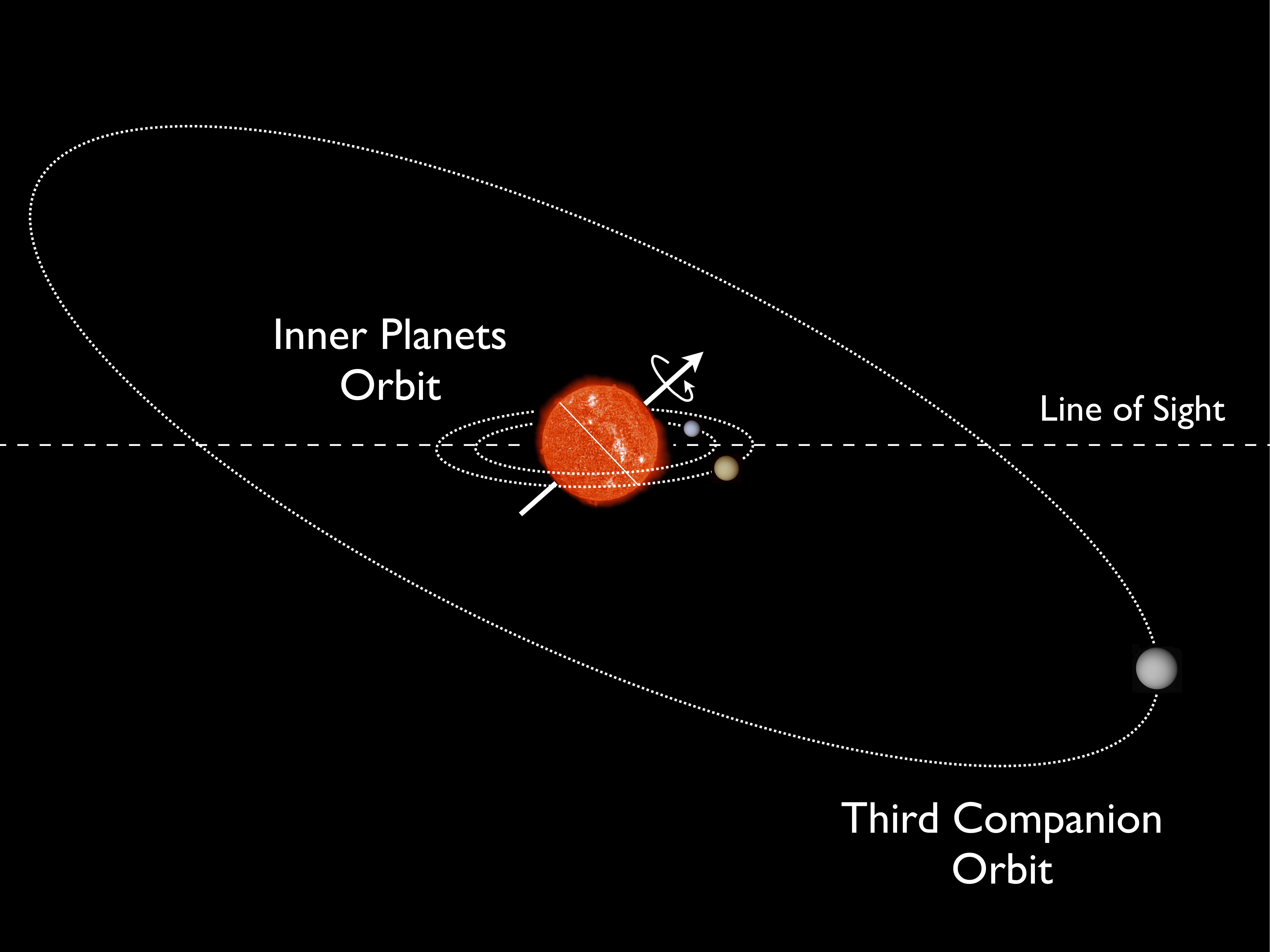
- Graphical sketch of the Kepler-56 system. The line of sight from Earth is illustrated by the dashed line, and dotted lines show the orbits of three detected companions in the system. The solid arrow marks the rotation axis of the host star, and the thin solid line marks the host star's equator. Credit: NASA GSFC/Ames/D Huber

Observation data Epoch J2000.0 Equinox ICRS
- Constellation: Cygnus
- Right ascension: 19^{h} 35^{m} 02.0012^{s}
- Declination: +41° 52′ 18.692″
- Apparent magnitude (V): 12.8

Characteristics
- Evolutionary stage: red giant branch

Astrometry
Radial velocity (R_{v})	−53.7 km/s
Proper motion (μ)	RA: −6.596(12) mas/yr Dec.: −12.081(13) mas/yr
Parallax (π)	1.0755±0.0118 mas
Distance	3,030 ± 30 ly (930 ± 10 pc)

Details
Mass	1.29±0.01 M_{☉}
Radius	4.18±0.13 R_{☉}
Luminosity (bolometric)	9.59±0.13 L_{☉}
Surface gravity (log g)	3.09 cgs
Temperature	4,973±14 K
Metallicity [Fe/H]	0.30 dex
Age	3.92±0.156 Gyr

Other designations
- Kepler-56, KOI-1241, KIC 6448890, 2MASS 19350200+4152187

Database references
SIMBAD	data
Exoplanet Archive	data

Kepler-56 is a red giant in the constellation Cygnus. It is located roughly 3,030 light-years (930 pc) away from the solar system and has slightly more mass than the Sun.

== Characteristics ==
Kepler-56 is a red giant star. This means it is no longer fusing hydrogen in its core and is off the main sequence. Its mass is around 1.3 M_{☉}. Its radius is about 4.2 R_{☉}, putting the star's density at about 0.025 g/cm^{3}. For reference, the Sun's density is about 1.408 g/cm^{3}. Kepler-56's metallicity is about 0.0251 Z_{0}/X_{0}. Its luminosity is about 9.6 L_{☉}, and its effective temperature is 4,973 K (4,700 °C; 8,492 °F).

Kepler-56 is about 3.9 billion years old, placing it as about 600 million years younger than the Sun. Its apparent magnitude is +13, making it too dim to be visible to the naked eye.

== Planetary system ==
In 2012, scientists discovered a two-planet planetary system around Kepler-56 via the transit method. Asteroseismological studies revealed that the orbits of Kepler-56b and Kepler-56c are coplanar but about 45° misaligned to the host star's equator. In addition, follow-up radial velocity measurements showed evidence of a gravitational perturbator. It was confirmed in 2016 that the perturbations are caused by a third, non-transiting planet: Kepler-56d.

The planetary system is very compact but is dynamically stable.

Kepler-56 is expanding. As a result, it will devour Kepler-56b and Kepler-56c in 130 and 155 million years, respectively. 56d will be far enough to survive its parent star's red giant phase.

The Kepler-56 planetary system
Companion (in order from star)	Mass	Semimajor axis (AU)	Orbital period (days)	Eccentricity	Inclination (°)	Radius
b	22.25344 M_{🜨}	0.1028	10.5034294	—	79.640	3.61 R_{🜨}
c	0.569 M_{J}	0.1652	21.4050484	—	81.930	7.84 R_{🜨}
d	>5.61±0.38 M_{J}	2.16±0.08	1002±5	0.20±0.01	—	—
