= Xi Aquilae =

Red-clump giant star in the constellation Aquila

ξ Aquilae / Libertas
- Location of ξ Aquilae (circled)

Observation data Epoch J2000.0 Equinox J2000.0
- Constellation: Aquila
- Right ascension: 19^{h} 54^{m} 14.8815^{s}
- Declination: +08° 27′ 41.235″
- Apparent magnitude (V): 4.722

Characteristics
- Evolutionary stage: red clump
- Spectral type: G9.5 IIIb
- U−B color index: +0.89
- B−V color index: +1.049
- R−I color index: 0.57

Astrometry
Radial velocity (R_{v})	−42.10 ± 0.14 km/s
Proper motion (μ)	RA: 101.694(107) mas/yr Dec.: −81.141(77) mas/yr
Parallax (π)	17.5183±0.1006 mas
Distance	186 ± 1 ly (57.1 ± 0.3 pc)
Absolute magnitude (M_{V})	+0.96

Details
Mass	1.74+0.21 −0.28 M_{☉}
Radius	10.17±0.16 R_{☉}
Luminosity	58.54+6.02 −12.37 L_{☉}
Surface gravity (log g)	2.61±0.08 cgs
Temperature	4,841 K
Metallicity [Fe/H]	−0.11+0.06 −0.1 dex
Rotational velocity (v sin i)	5.2 km/s
Age	980±180 Myr

Other designations
- Libertas, ξ Aquilae, Xi Aql, ξ Aql, 59 Aquilae, BD+08 4261, GC 27558, HD 188310, HIP 97938, HR 7595, SAO 125210, PPM 168913, WDS J19542+0828AB

Database references
SIMBAD	data

Xi Aquilae is a star in the equatorial constellation of Aquila. Its name is a Bayer designation that is Latinized from ξ Aquilae, and abbreviated Xi Aql or ξ Aql. The star has the official name Libertas, pronounced /ˈlɪbərtæs/, a Latin word for liberty. Based on parallax measurements, it is located at a distance of 186 light-years (57 parsecs) from the Sun. This is an aging giant star that is close to a billion years old.

A companion star has been detected using speckle interferometry 0.09″ away.

As of 2008, an extrasolar planet has been confirmed in orbit around the star. Designated Xi Aquilae b, this massive world was later named Fortitudo.

== Nomenclature ==
ξ Aquilae (Latinised to Xi Aquilae) is the star's Bayer designation. Following its discovery the planet was designated Xi Aquilae b.

In July 2014 the International Astronomical Union launched NameExoWorlds, a process for giving proper names to certain exoplanets and their host stars. The process involved public nomination and voting for the new names. In December 2015, the IAU announced the winning names were Libertas for this star and Fortitudo for its planet.

The winning names were those submitted by Libertyer, a student club at Hosei University of Tokyo, Japan. The names which were originally proposed were in English and were 'Liberty' and 'Fortitude', but to comply with the IAU's rules they were modified to be Latin versions of the same words, and so the final names became 'Libertas' and 'Fortitudo' respectively. 'Aquila' is Latin for 'eagle', a popular symbol of liberty and embodiment of fortitude—emotional and mental strength in the face of adversity.

In 2016, the IAU organized a Working Group on Star Names (WGSN) to catalog and standardize proper names for stars. In its first bulletin of July 2016, the WGSN explicitly recognized the names of exoplanets and their host stars approved by the Executive Committee Working Group Public Naming of Planets and Planetary Satellites, including the names of stars adopted during the 2015 NameExoWorlds campaign. This star is now so entered in the IAU Catalog of Star Names.

== Properties ==
This star has an apparent visual magnitude of 4.722, which, according to the Bortle Dark-Sky scale, is bright enough to be viewed with the naked eye from dark suburban skies. The orbital motion of the Earth causes this star to undergo an annual parallax shift of 17.51 milliarcseconds. From this measurement, the distance to this star can be determined, yielding an estimate of approximately 186 light-years with an error of 1 light year. The magnitude of the star is diminished by 0.09 from the extinction caused by interstellar gas and dust.

The spectrum of this star is considered a standard example of the stellar classification G9.5 IIIb, where the G9.5 means that it belongs to the category of G-type stars while the luminosity class of IIIb indicates that, at an estimated age of nearly one billion year, is an evolved star that has reached the giant stage. It is in the red clump, meaning it is generating energy through the fusion of helium into carbon at its core.

Xi Aquilae has an estimated 174% of the Sun's mass. Its size has been measured using interferometry at the Navy Precision Optical Interferometer, which yields a radius 10.17 times that of the Sun. It is radiating 58.5 times the Sun's luminosity at an effective temperature of 4,841 K, giving it the golden-hued glow of a G-type star. The possibility of a binary stellar companion can be ruled out based upon observations with the CHARA array.

== Planetary system ==
In 2008, the presence of a planetary companion was announced, based upon Doppler spectroscopy results from the Okayama Astrophysical Observatory. This object, designated as Xi Aquilae b, has at least 2.8 Jupiter masses and is orbiting at an estimated 0.68 astronomical unit from the star with a period of 136.75 days. Any planets that once orbited to the interior of this object may have been consumed as the star entered the red giant stage and expanded in radius. Later in 2024, astrometric measurements place an upper limit in the mass of 37.1 M_{J} based on Gaia astrometry.

The Xi Aquilae planetary system
Companion (in order from star)	Mass	Semimajor axis (AU)	Orbital period (days)	Eccentricity	Inclination	Radius
b (Fortitudo)	≥2.8 and <37.1 M_{J}	0.68	136.75±0.25	0 (fixed)	—	—
