= HD 16175 =

Star in the constellation Andromeda

HD 16175 / Buna
Observation data Epoch J2000.0 Equinox ICRS
- Constellation: Andromeda
- Right ascension: 02^{h} 37^{m} 01.91118^{s}
- Declination: +42° 03′ 45.4685″
- Apparent magnitude (V): 7.28

Characteristics
- Evolutionary stage: subgiant
- Spectral type: F8 IV
- B−V color index: 0.64

Astrometry
Radial velocity (R_{v})	21.83±0.14 km/s
Proper motion (μ)	RA: −38.864 mas/yr Dec.: −41.234 mas/yr
Parallax (π)	16.6670±0.0279 mas
Distance	195.7 ± 0.3 ly (60.0 ± 0.1 pc)
Absolute magnitude (M_{V})	3.40

Details
Mass	1.34±0.01 M_{☉}
Radius	1.66±0.04 R_{☉}
Luminosity	3.3±0.01 L_{☉}
Surface gravity (log g)	4.12±0.03 cgs
Temperature	6,048±35 K
Age	3.2±0.2 Gyr

Other designations
- BD+41°496, HIP 12191, SAO 38170

Database references
SIMBAD	data

HD 16175 is a 7th magnitude G-type star with temperature about 6,000 K located 196 light-years (60 parsecs) away in the constellation Andromeda. This star is only visible through binoculars or better equipment; it is also 3.3 times as luminous, is 1.34 times as massive, and has a radius 1.66 times as big as the Sun.

The star HD 16175 is named Buna. The name was selected in the NameExoWorlds campaign by Ethiopia, during the 100th anniversary of the IAU. Buna is the commonly used word for coffee in Ethiopia.

== Planetary system ==
The discovery of the exoplanet HD 16175 b was published in the June 2009 issue of the Publications of the Astronomical Society of the Pacific. The planetary parameters were updated in 2016. In 2023, the inclination and true mass of HD 16175 b were determined via astrometry.

The HD 16175 planetary system
Companion (in order from star)	Mass	Semimajor axis (AU)	Orbital period (years)	Eccentricity	Inclination (°)	Radius
b / Abol	5.9+1.8 −1.0 M_{J}	2.13+0.075 −0.08	2.686+0.031 −0.039	0.675±0.026	59+20 −19 or 121+19 −20	—

== See also ==
- HD 96167
- List of extrasolar planets
