= Kappa Coronae Borealis =

Star in the constellation Corona Borealis

- Location of κ Coronae Borealis (circled)

Observation data Epoch J2000.0 Equinox ICRS
- Constellation: Corona Borealis
- Right ascension: 15^{h} 51^{m} 13.9313^{s}
- Declination: +35° 39′ 26.574″
- Apparent magnitude (V): +4.79

Characteristics
- Evolutionary stage: red giant branch
- Spectral type: K0 III-IV
- B−V color index: 0.996±0.005

Astrometry
Radial velocity (R_{v})	−25.16±0.13 km/s
Proper motion (μ)	RA: −8.669 mas/yr Dec.: −348.350 mas/yr
Parallax (π)	33.3433±0.0800 mas
Distance	97.8 ± 0.2 ly (29.99 ± 0.07 pc)
Absolute magnitude (M_{V})	+2.37

Details
Mass	1.32±0.10 M_{☉}
Radius	4.77±0.07 R_{☉}
Luminosity	11.6±0.3 L_{☉}
Surface gravity (log g)	3.15±0.14 cgs
Temperature	4,870±47 K
Metallicity [Fe/H]	+0.13±0.03 dex

Other designations
- κ CrB, 11 CrB, HD 142091, HIP 77655, HR 5901, SAO 64948

Database references
SIMBAD	data

Kappa Coronae Borealis is a star in the northern constellation of Corona Borealis. Its name is a Bayer designation that is Latinized from κ Coronae Borealis, and abbreviated Kappa CrB or κ CrB. The star is visible to the naked eye with an apparent visual magnitude of +4.82. Based on parallax measurements, it is located at a distance of 97.8 light-years (30.0 pc) from the Earth. The star is drifting closer to the Sun with a line of sight velocity component of −25 km/s.

This is an evolved K-type star of spectral type K0 III-IV, meaning it has completely exhausted its hydrogen supply at its core. Around 2.5 billion years old, it was an A-type main sequence star. It is 1.32 times as massive as the Sun and has expanded to 4.8 times the Sun's radius. The star is radiating 11.6 times the Sun's luminosity from its enlarged photosphere at an effective temperature of 4,870 K.

== Dust disk ==
In March 2013, it was announced that resolved images of at least one dust disk surrounding Kappa Coronae Borealis were captured, making it the first subgiant to host such circumstellar belt. The disk extends out from 50 AU to 180 AU, and there is an estimated 0.016 M_{🜨} of dust.

== Planetary system ==
In October 2007, a giant planet was found by Johnson et al., who used the radial velocity method. In 2012 it was confirmed.

This planet was assumed to be outside the habitable zone on the assumption that the star is K1IVa. Given the star's luminosity, the planet is more likely on the zone's inner edge.

The width of the circumstellar belt suggests the presence of a second planetary companion of the star, either within it or between two narrower belts.

The Kappa Coronae Borealis planetary system
Companion (in order from star)	Mass	Semimajor axis (AU)	Orbital period (days)	Eccentricity	Inclination (°)	Radius
b	≥1.811±0.057 M_{J}	2.65±0.13	1285±14	0.167±0.032	—	—

== See also ==
- List of extrasolar planets
