= Iota Draconis b =

Extrasolar planet in the constellation Draco

Iota Draconis b / Hypatia
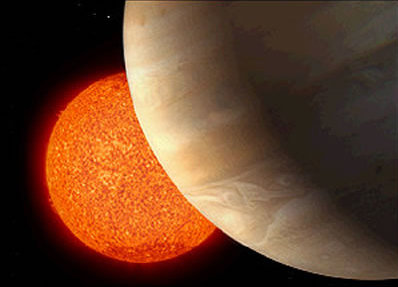
- Artist's concept of Iota Draconis b (foreground) orbiting its parent star (center)

Discovery
- Discovered by: Frink et al.
- Discovery date: January 8, 2002
- Detection method: Doppler Spectroscopy

Orbital characteristics
- Semi-major axis: 1.453±0.026 AU
- Eccentricity: 0.7010+0.0016 −0.0017
- Orbital period (sidereal): 1.398643 ± 0.000035 a (510.854 ± 0.013 d)
- Inclination: 46+27 −19
- Longitude of ascending node: 87+64 −60
- Time of periastron: 2455590.17±0.13
- Argument of periastron: 89.90±0.30
- Semi-amplitude: 307.6 (± 2.3)
- Star: Iota Draconis

Physical characteristics
- Mean radius: 1.1+0.22 −0.19 R_{J}
- Mass: 16.4+9.3 −4.0 M_{J}

Iota Draconis b, properly named Hypatia (pronounced /haɪˈpeɪʃiə/ or /hɪˈpeɪʃə/), is an exoplanet orbiting the K-type giant star Iota Draconis about 101.2 light-years (31 parsecs, or nearly 2.932×10^{14} km) from Earth in the constellation Draco. The exoplanet was found by using the radial velocity method, from radial-velocity measurements via observation of Doppler shifts in the spectrum of the planet's parent star.

== Physical characteristics ==
=== Mass ===
Iota Draconis b is a "super-Jupiter", a planet that has mass larger than that of the gas giants Jupiter and Saturn. It has an estimated minimum mass of around 11.82 M_{J}.

In 2021, astrometric observations revealed the true mass of Iota Draconis b to be 16.4 M_{J}.

=== Host star ===
The planet orbits a (K-type) giant star named Edasich (designated Iota Draconis). The star has exhausted the hydrogen supply in its core and is currently fusing helium. The star has a mass of 1.82 M_{☉} and a radius of around 12 R_{☉}. It has a surface temperature of 4545 K and is around 800 million years old based on its evolution. Although much younger than the Sun, the higher mass of this star correlates to a faster evolution, leading to the host star having already departed from the main sequence. When on the main sequence, Edasich was probably a Class A star with surface temperature between 7,400 and 10,000K. In comparison, the Sun is about 4.6 billion years old and has a surface temperature of 5778 K.

The star's apparent magnitude, a measure of how bright it appears from Earth, is 3.31. Therefore, Edasich can be seen with the naked eye.

=== Orbit ===
Iota Draconis b orbits its star with nearly 55 times the Sun's luminosity (55 L_{☉}) every 511 days at an average distance of 1.275 AU (compared to Mars' orbital distance from the Sun, which is 1.52 AU) It has a very eccentric orbit, with an eccentricity of 0.7124.

== Discovery ==
Discovered in 2002 during a radial velocity study of K-class giant stars, its eccentric orbit aided its detection, as giant stars have pulsations which can mimic the presence of a planet.

== Name ==
Following its discovery the planet was designated Iota Draconis b. In July 2014, the International Astronomical Union launched NameExoWorlds, a process for giving proper names to certain exoplanets and their host stars. The process involved public nomination and voting for the new names. In December 2015, the IAU announced that the winning name for this planet was Hypatia. The winning name was submitted by Hypatia, a student society of the Physics Faculty of the Universidad Complutense de Madrid, Spain. Hypatia was a famous Greek astronomer, mathematician, and philosopher.
