= HD 16175 b =

Extrasolar planet in the Andromeda constellation

HD 16175 b / Abol
Discovery
- Discovered by: Peek et al.
- Discovery site: Lick Observatory
- Detection method: radial velocity

Orbital characteristics
- Semi-major axis: 2.13+0.075 −0.08 AU
- Eccentricity: 0.675±0.026
- Orbital period (sidereal): 981+11 −14 d 2.686+0.031 −0.039 yr
- Inclination: 59°+20° −19° or 121°+19° −20°
- Longitude of ascending node: 78°+27° −28°
- Time of periastron: 2455800.4+4.9 −5.1
- Argument of periastron: 216.8°+4.8° −4.7°
- Semi-amplitude: 51.75±2.5
- Star: HD 16175

Physical characteristics
- Mean radius: 1.14 R_{J} (estimate)
- Mass: 5.9+1.8 −1.0 M_{J}

HD 16175 b is an exoplanet located approximately 195.7 light-years away in the constellation of Andromeda, orbiting the star HD 16175. This planet has a minimum mass 4.8 times that of Jupiter; the true mass was initially unknown since the inclination of the orbit was unknown. This planet orbits at about 2.2 astronomical units, taking 2.73 years to revolve around the star. The orbit of the planet is highly elliptical with an eccentricity of 0.64. In 2023, the inclination and true mass of HD 16175 b were determined via astrometry.

The planet HD 16175 b is named Abol. The name was selected in the NameExoWorlds campaign by Ethiopia, during the 100th anniversary of the IAU. Abol is the first of three rounds of coffee in the Ethiopian traditional coffee ceremony.

== Discovery ==
The discovery was made using radial velocity measurements taken between November 2004 and March 2009 with the Coudé Auxiliary and C. Donald Shane telescopes at Lick Observatory.

== See also ==
- List of extrasolar planets
