= 42 Draconis =

Star in the constellation Draco

42 Draconis / Fafnir
- Location of 42 Draconis (circled in red)

Observation data Epoch J2000 Equinox ICRS
- Constellation: Draco
- Right ascension: 18^{h} 25^{m} 59.13696^{s}
- Declination: +65° 33′ 48.5313″
- Apparent magnitude (V): 4.82

Characteristics
- Spectral type: K1.5 III
- B−V color index: 1.18

Astrometry
Radial velocity (R_{v})	31.75±0.12 km/s
Proper motion (μ)	RA: +105.816 mas/yr Dec.: −26.846 mas/yr
Parallax (π)	11.056±0.0841 mas
Distance	295 ± 2 ly (90.4 ± 0.7 pc)
Absolute magnitude (M_{V})	−0.10

Details
Mass	1.07±0.01 M_{☉}
Radius	19.78±0.17 R_{☉}
Luminosity	129.26+1.77 −1.05 L_{☉}
Surface gravity (log g)	1.9±0.02 cgs
Temperature	4,449+11 −17 K
Metallicity [Fe/H]	−0.43±0.01 dex
Rotation	554±142 d (~479 or ~690 d)
Rotational velocity (v sin i)	1.76±0.45 km/s
Age	9.49±1.76 Gyr; 13.19±1.92 Gyr

Other designations
- Fafnir, BD+65°1271, GC 25212, HD 170693, HIP 90344, HR 6945, SAO 17888, PPM 20916, GCRV 10941

Database references
SIMBAD	data
Exoplanet Archive	data

42 Draconis (abbreviated 42 Dra), formally named Fafnir (/ˈfɑːvnər/ or /ˈfɑːfnɪər/), is a 5th magnitude K-type giant star located approximately 295 light-years away in the constellation of Draco. An exoplanet (designated 42 Draconis b, later named Orbitar) was once thought to be orbiting the star, but its existence has since been refuted.

Of spectral type K1.5III, the star has a mass similar to the Sun but with a radius 22 times greater. It is a metal-poor star with metallicity as low as 35% that of the Sun and its age is 9.49 billion years. It is the southern pole star of Venus.

A 2019 study using Gaia DR2 data found a companion star to 42 Draconis, about half the Sun's mass, at a separation of 24 arcseconds, corresponding to 2220 AU.

== Nomenclature ==
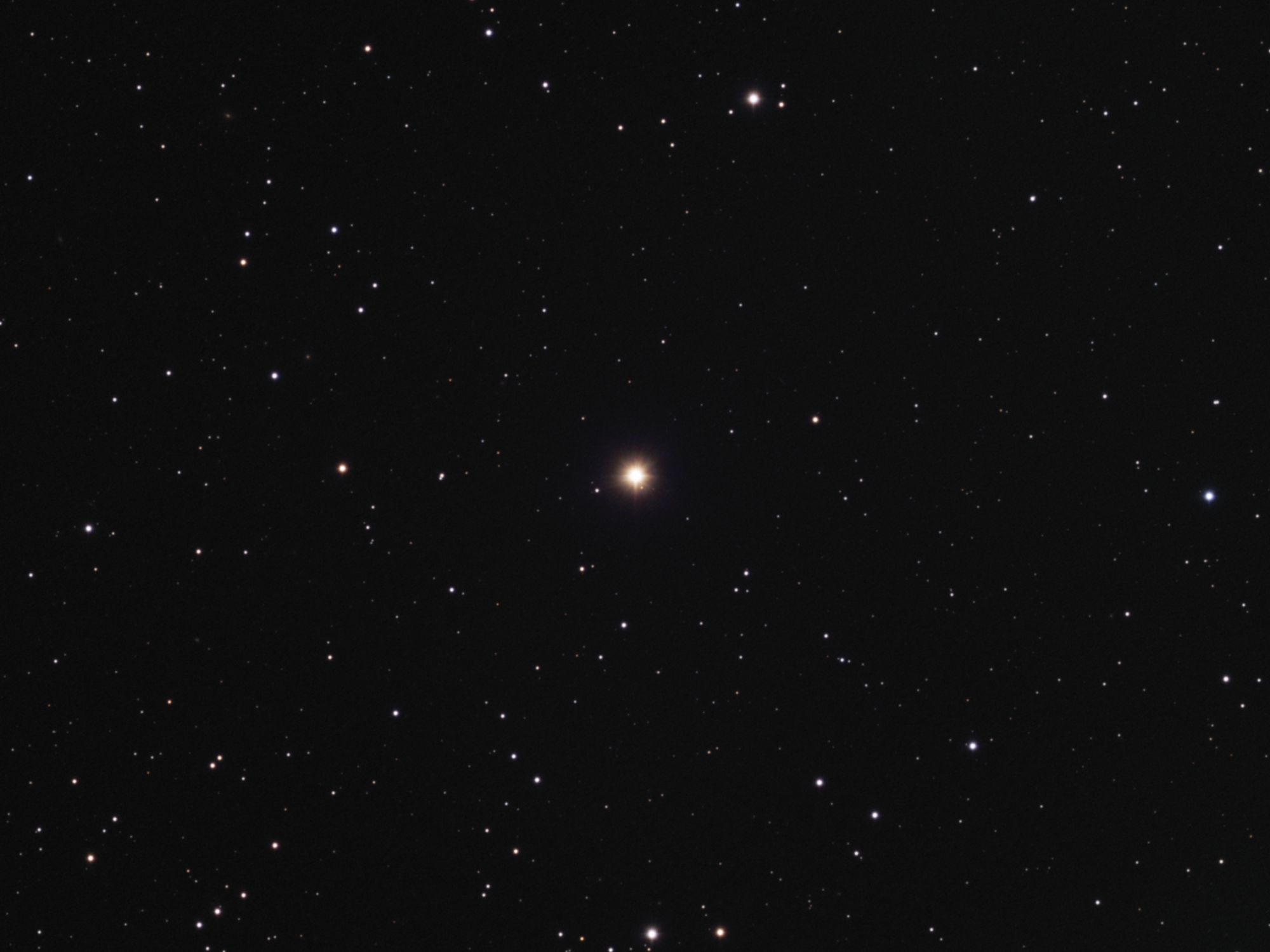
42 Draconis in optical light

42 Draconis is the star's Flamsteed designation. Following its discovery the planet was designated 42 Draconis b. In July 2014 the International Astronomical Union launched NameExoWorlds, a process for giving proper names to certain exoplanets and their host stars. The process involved public nomination and voting for the new names. In December 2015, the IAU announced the winning names were Fafnir for this star and Orbitar for its planet.

The winning names were submitted by the Brevard Astronomical Society of Brevard County, Florida, United States. Fafnir was a Norse mythological dwarf who turned into a Germanic dragon. It is also the name of a fictional planet in Larry Niven's Known Space universe of similar description, ('Draco' is Latin for 'dragon'); Orbitar is a contrived word paying homage to the space launch and orbital operations of NASA.

In 2016, the IAU organized a Working Group on Star Names (WGSN) to catalog and standardize proper names for stars. In its first bulletin of July 2016, the WGSN explicitly recognized the names of exoplanets and their host stars approved by the Executive Committee Working Group Public Naming of Planets and Planetary Satellites, including the names of stars adopted during the 2015 NameExoWorlds campaign. This star is now so entered in the IAU Catalog of Star Names.

== Disproven planet ==
The discovery of 42 Draconis b (later named Orbitar) by the radial velocity method was announced in 2009. It was thought to be a super-Jupiter, with a minimum mass 4 times that of Jupiter, an orbital period of 479 days, and an eccentricity of 0.38. However, the existence of this planet was questioned in a 2021 study by the same authors, which found that more recent radial velocity measurements were inconsistent with the proposed planetary orbit. With further observations, by 2025 the planet hypothesis could be conclusively ruled out. The star appears to have intrinsic radial velocity variations that mimic a planetary companion, as observed in other giant stars such as Gamma Draconis and Aldebaran.

In a 2024 study, 42 Draconis b was listed as one of several doubtful planets around giant stars, along with other named planets around 14 Andromedae and 41 Lyncis. With the 2025 refutation, it is now the second named exoplanet to be conclusively disproven, after Fomalhaut b (Dagon) in 2020.

== See also ==
- HD 139357
- Iota Draconis
- Lists of exoplanets
