= Iota Draconis =

Star in the constellation Draco

Iota Draconis / Edasich
- Location of ι Draconis (circled)

Observation data Epoch J2000 Equinox ICRS
- Constellation: Draco
- Right ascension: 15^{h} 24^{m} 55.77463^{s}
- Declination: +58° 57′ 57.8344″
- Apparent magnitude (V): 3.290

Characteristics
- Evolutionary stage: Red giant branch
- Spectral type: K2III
- U−B color index: +1.230
- B−V color index: +1.160
- Variable type: Suspected

Astrometry
Radial velocity (R_{v})	−10.71 km/s
Proper motion (μ)	RA: −8.36 mas/yr Dec.: +17.08 mas/yr
Parallax (π)	32.23±0.10 mas
Distance	101.2 ± 0.3 ly (31.03 ± 0.10 pc)
Absolute magnitude (M_{V})	0.99±0.007

Details
Mass	1.56±0.08 M_{☉}
Radius	11.99±0.06 R_{☉}
Luminosity	52.8±2.1 L_{☉}
Surface gravity (log g)	2.52^{+0.007}_{−0.07} cgs
Temperature	4,504±62 K
Metallicity [Fe/H]	+0.03±0.08 dex
Rotation	434 days
Rotational velocity (v sin i)	1.5 km/s
Age	2.49^{+0.64}_{−0.62} Gyr

Other designations
- Edasich, 12 Draconis, BD+59 1654, FK5 571, HD 137759, HIP 75458, HR 5744, SAO 29520, 2MASS J15245578+5857577

Database references
SIMBAD	data
Exoplanet Archive	data

Iota Draconis (ι Draconis, abbreviated Iota Dra, ι Dra), also named Edasich /ˈɛdəsɪk/, is a star in the northern circumpolar constellation of Draco. A visually unremarkable star of apparent magnitude 3.3, in 2002 it was discovered to have a planet orbiting it (designated Iota Draconis b, later named Hypatia). From parallax measurements, this star is located at a distance of about 101.2 light-years (31.0 parsecs) from the Sun.

== Nomenclature ==
ι Draconis (Latinised to Iota Draconis) is the star's Bayer designation. On discovery the planet was designated Iota Draconis b (or Edasich b).

It bore the traditional name Edasich, derived from the Arabic al-dhīkh (الذيخ) 'the male hyena' attested by Kazwini, with Eldsich being recorded in the Century Cyclopedia. In 2016, the International Astronomical Union organized a Working Group on Star Names (WGSN) to catalog and standardize proper names for stars. The WGSN's first bulletin of July 2016 included a table of the first two batches of names approved by the WGSN; which included Edasich for this star.

In July 2014 the International Astronomical Union launched NameExoWorlds, a process for giving proper names to certain exoplanets and their host stars. The process involved public nomination and voting for the new names. In December 2015, the IAU announced the winning name was Hypatia for this planet. The winning name was submitted by Hypatia, a student society of the Physics Faculty of the Universidad Complutense de Madrid, Spain. Hypatia was a famous Greek astronomer, mathematician, and philosopher.

In Chinese astronomy, 紫微左垣 (Zǐ Wēi Zuǒ Yuán), meaning Left Wall of Purple Forbidden Enclosure, refers to an asterism consisting of Iota Draconis, Theta Draconis, Eta Draconis, Zeta Draconis, Upsilon Draconis, 73 Draconis, Gamma Draconis and 23 Cassiopeiae. Consequently, the Chinese name for Iota Draconis itself is 紫微左垣一 (Zǐ Wēi Zuǒ Yuán yī, English: the First Star of Left Wall of Purple Forbidden Enclosure), representing 左樞 (Zuǒshū), meaning Left Pivot. 左樞 (Zuǒshū) is westernized into Tsao Choo by R.H. Allen with the same meaning.

== Properties ==
Iota Draconis is larger and more massive than the Sun, with 1.6 times the mass and nearly 12 times the radius. The spectrum matches a stellar classification of K2 III, indicating this is an evolved star that has exhausted the supply of hydrogen at its core and left the main sequence. It is currently on the red giant branch, fusing hydrogen in a shell around its helium core. With an expanded outer envelope, it is radiating over 50 times the luminosity of the Sun at an effective temperature of 4,504 K. This temperature gives it an orange hue that is a characteristic of K-type stars. It is rotating at a leisurely rate, with a period of around 434 days. It is about 2.5 billion years old.

In the past Iota Draconis has been suspected of variability. However, the star has been found to have a constant luminosity to within about 0.004 magnitudes. Hence, as of 2010, the variability remains unconfirmed. An excess emission of infrared radiation at a wavelength of 70 μm suggests the presence of a circumstellar disk of dust; what astronomers term a debris disk.

Edasich is the faintest star of which a color has been reported in pre-telescopic times. It was classified as an orange-red star.

== Planetary system ==
The Iota Draconis planetary system
Companion (in order from star)	Mass	Semimajor axis (AU)	Orbital period (years)	Eccentricity	Inclination (°)	Radius
b (Hypatia)	16.4^{+9.3}_{−4.0} M_{J}	1.453±0.026	1.39864±0.00004	0.7010^{+0.0016}_{−0.0017}	46^{+27}_{−19}	—
c	17.0^{+13}_{−5.4} M_{J}	19.4^{+10}_{−7.7}	68^{+60}_{−36}	0.455^{+0.12}_{−0.084}	86±19	—
Dust disk	? AU				—	—

The planetary companion discovered in 2002 was the first planet known to orbit a giant star. It was noted that the alignment of this planet's eccentric orbit means it has about 11% probability of transiting its star. Another long-period planet or brown dwarf was discovered in 2021, and the true masses of both planets were measured via astrometry.
