= Musée Dräi Eechelen =

Museum in the Kirchberg district of Luxembourg City

Coordinates: 49°36′59″N 06°08′20″E

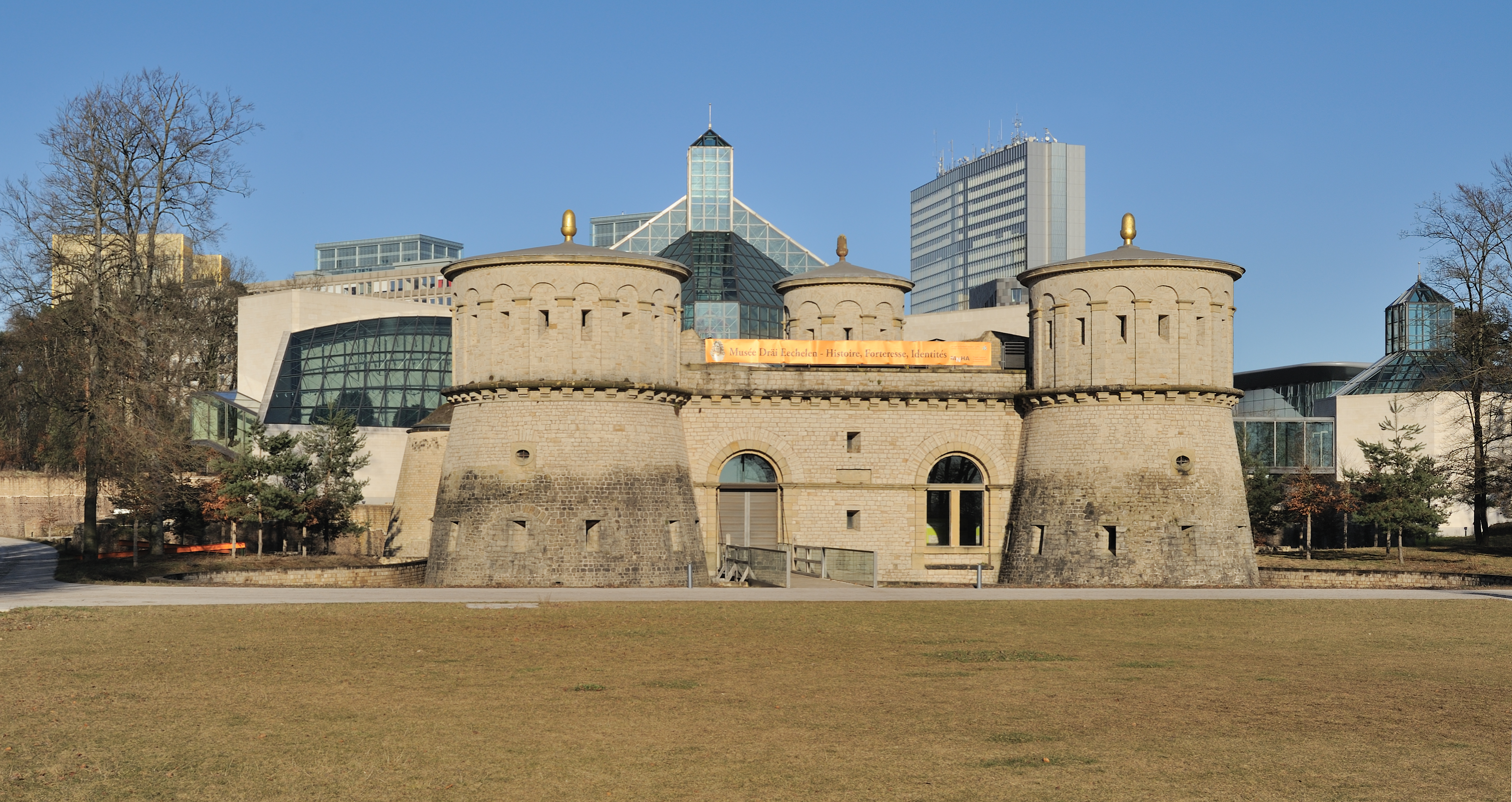
- Established: 2012
- Location: Fort Thüngen, Luxembourg City, Luxembourg
- Type: History museum
- Website: m3e.public.lu/fr.html

Musée Dräi Eechelen (literal translation: Three Acorns Museum) is a museum in the Kirchberg district of Luxembourg City in the Grand Duchy of Luxembourg. Opened in July 2012 in the fully restored 18th-century Fort Thüngen, its permanent exhibition traces Luxembourg's history from 1443 to 1903.

== History ==
The museum is housed in the fully restored Fort Thüngen, built by the Austrians in 1732 to reinforce the Fortress of Luxembourg. In 1836 and in 1859–60, it was extended by the Prussians forming part of the outer defences known as the Grünewald Front (Front de Grünewald). As a consequence of the 1867 Treaty of London, most of the building was demolished apart from its three rounded turrets, colloquially known as Dräi Eechelen (Luxembourgish) or Les Trois Glands (French), meaning "The Three Acorns".

In 1996, the Luxembourg authorities approved the development of a so-called Musée de la Forteresse (Fortress Museum) in Fort Thüngen with a view to "illustrating and explaining the nature of the fortress of Luxembourg in regard to the history of the city, the territorial development of the country and the cultural identity of the nation".

The museum forms part of Luxembourg's National Museum of History and Art.

== Permanent exhibition ==
Some 600 artefacts in the permanent exhibition illustrate the history of the city and country of Luxembourg from the Burgundian conquest in 1443 to the construction of the Adolphe Bridge in 1903. They are exhibited in a series of casemates (or underground galleries), six of which cover specific periods from the medieval fortress (1443-1643) to the height of the city's development (1883-1903). Two further casemates house a multimedia room and a series of photographs illustrating the city and the fortress in the 19th century.

With its striking underground galleries and passageways, the building itself forms an important part of the permanent exhibition. It has been restored to reflect the last phase of its original expansion in 1837.

== See also ==
- List of museums in Luxembourg
