= Gibraltar of the North =

The moniker "Gibraltar of the North" has been used to describe several fortresses and islands known for their strong fortifications. These include:

- Fortress of Luxembourg, Luxembourg
- Fortress of Louisbourg, Nova Scotia
- Suomenlinna (Sveaborg), Finland
- Heligoland, Germany
- Isle of Portland, England

== See also ==
- Rock of Gibraltar
