= Fort Thüngen =

Fort within the larger Luxembourg Fortress

Coordinates: 49°36′59″N 06°08′20″E

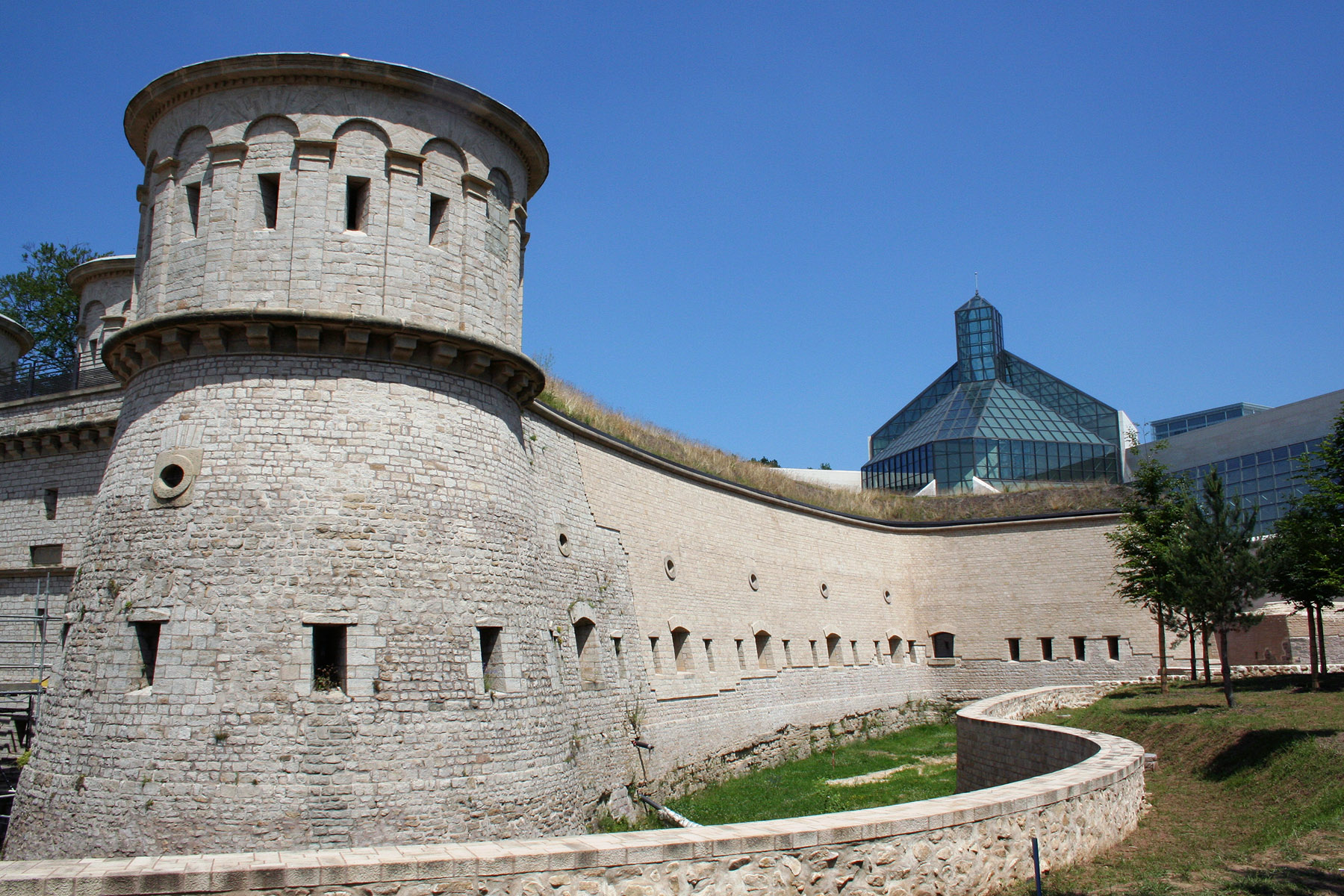
The reconstructed Fort Thüngen houses Musée Dräi Eechelen.

Fort Thüngen is a historic fortification in Luxembourg City, in southern Luxembourg. It is located in Dräi Eechelen Park, in the Kirchberg district, in the north-east of the city. It is also colloquially known as Three Acorns (Luxembourgish: Dräi Eechelen, French: Trois glands, German: Drei Eicheln) in reference to the acorns that sit atop each of the three towers.

The fort was built in 1732-1733 and named after military commander Adam Sigmund von Thüngen. In 1836 and from 1859 to 1860, the fort was enlarged and reinforced. Most of the original fortress was demolished after the 1867 Treaty of London, which demanded the demolition of Luxembourg City's numerous fortifications. The three towers and the foundations of the rest of the fort were all that remained. During the 1990s, the site was reconstructed in its entirety, in parallel with the development of the site for the construction of the Mudam, Luxembourg's museum of modern art. After being fully restored, the building was reopened in 2012 as Musée Dräi Eechelen.
