= Eich Gate =

French fortification built by Vauban in Luxembourg City

Coordinates: 49°36′59″N 6°07′52″E

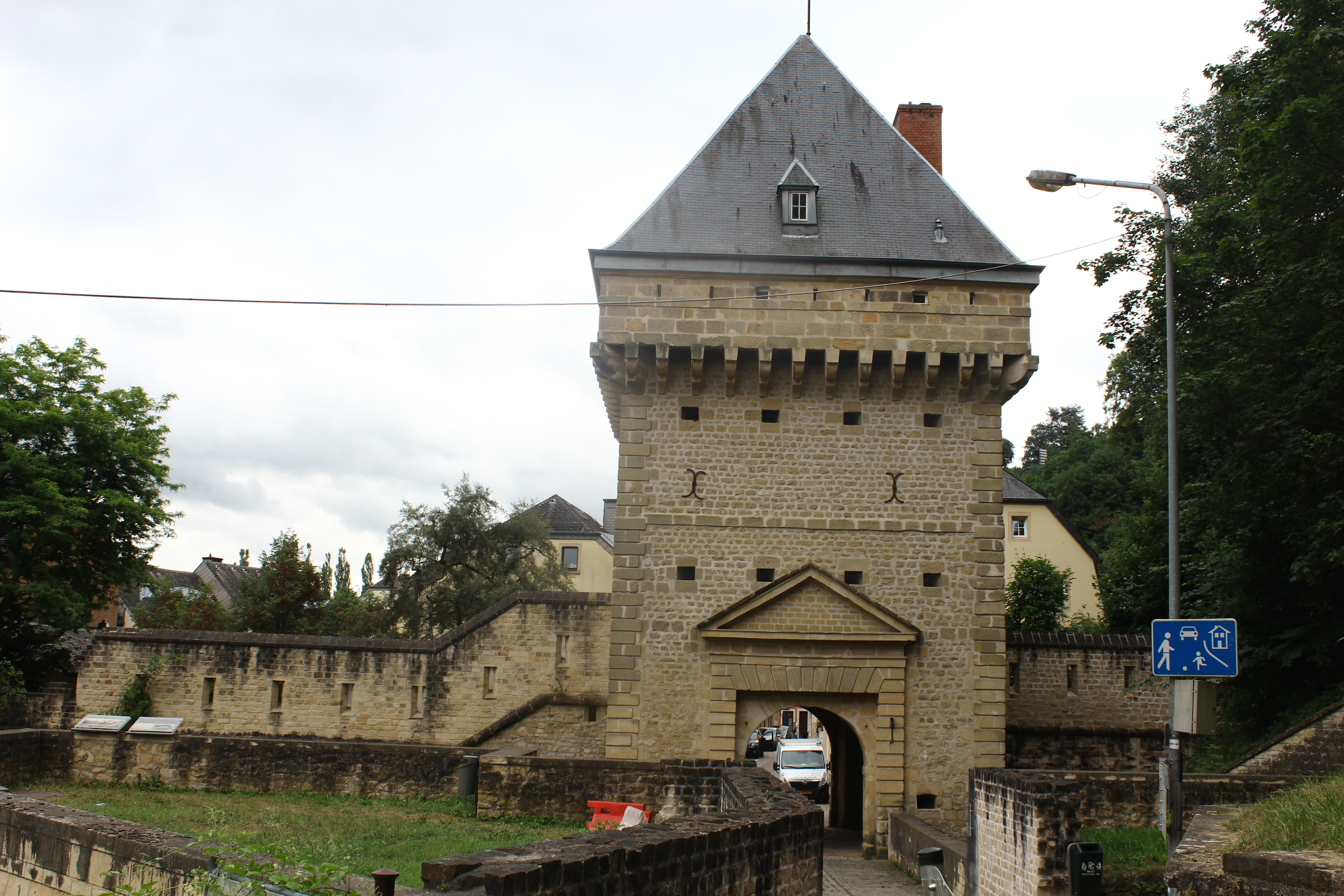
The Eich gate, one of the only remaining gates built by Vauban in Luxembourg City.

Eich Gate is a French fortification located in the Grand-Duchy of Luxembourg. Records of the gate first mention it in 1447. The gatehouse was built by the French engineer Sébastien Le Prestre, otherwise known as Vauban. Today, the gatehouse is a tourist destination.

== Description ==
The tower is a square shape, which is topped with a slate roof. The tower itself was constructed out of large, cut stone blocks. Above the entrance was an acute triangle, and below that was a rectangular piece of protruding masonry. Within the rectangular masonry is an ornate arch. Vauban thought that every entranceway reflected the magnificence of the king and the goodness of the place, so it should be ornate. Since the gatehouse guarded the entrance to the city, it was heavily reinforced. To protect the tower against artillery, the north, east, and west sides, the most vulnerable, were reinforced with 6 ft of stone. The least vulnerable side, the east, had only 4 ft of stone protection. In between the ground and first floor was a hollow “vault” space, which was to be filled with bundles of sticks called fascines and manure. This was used so that if a howitzer fired through the first floor wall, it wouldn’t penetrate into the bottom floor. A parapet surrounds the top of the tower, which was used for defense.

The Eich Gate is on the upper right. The Ravelin added by the Austrians can be seen below the gatehouse.

12 machicollis (small triangles which “hold up” the floor) were on the underside of the parapet on each side. Between the machicollis were holes in which things could be dropped to defend the gatehouse. During peacetime these were closed off by wooden boards. On each side of the tower, there were 8 rifle embrasures, 4 on the first floor, 4 on the second. There were also 7 smaller embrasures on the parapet along the top of the building. The Alzette River ran in front of the gatehouse, which during Vauban’s time was crossed by a wooden drawbridge. Behind the drawbridge was a portcullis, which was lowered via winches at night to prevent an enemy from sneaking in or the garrison deserting. In 1737, the wooden drawbridge was replaced by the Austrians, which constructed a stationary masonry bridge.

The tower was divided into 4 levels, the first level was only for traffic, and had no connection to the upper floors. The first floor was accessed via the wall that runs alongside the gatehouse. This floor constrained all of the living quarters for troops, alongside a kitchen, and fireplace. A spiral staircase led to the second and third floor, which was used for the defense of the gatehouse. The officers who commanded the men stationed here lived in a separate building inside the city. The roof was topped by a fleur-de-lis, the symbol of French royalty. During the Austrian occupation of the city, a Ravelin (a small casemate for forward defense) was built on the opposite side of the Alzette.

== History ==
The Eich Gate was built by Vauban between 1684/85, and is the gate we see today. The gate was built to guard the town of Pfaffenthal, in central Luxembourg City. In 1737, the Austrians replaced the wooden drawbridge with a masonry one. In 1743, the Austrians added a Ravelin on the opposite bank of the Alzette. This was buried at an unknown date, and was only uncovered in 1998. This was added as part of the Austrian’s "Flats of the Tintenberg" fortifications. Today, the gate is a tourist attraction.
