= Nu1 Sagittarii =

Triple star system in the constellation Sagittarius

ν^{1} Sagittarii
- Location of ν^{1} Sagittarii (circled)

Observation data Epoch J2000.0 Equinox J2000.0 (ICRS)
- Constellation: Sagittarius
- Right ascension: 18^{h} 54^{m} 10.17695^{s}
- Declination: −22° 44′ 41.4247″
- Apparent magnitude (V): +4.86

Characteristics
- Spectral type: G2/K1 Ib/II + B9.2p
- U−B color index: +1.34
- B−V color index: +1.43

Astrometry
Radial velocity (R_{v})	−12.08±0.16 km/s
Proper motion (μ)	RA: 3.919±0.137 mas/yr Dec.: −8.092±0.107 mas/yr
Parallax (π)	1.8387±0.1091 mas
Distance	1,800 ± 100 ly (540 ± 30 pc)
Absolute magnitude (M_{V})	−3.91

Details

Aa
Mass	13.88 M_{☉}
Radius	101+40 −15 R_{☉}
Luminosity	3,464+30 −10 L_{☉}
Surface gravity (log g)	0.92±0.10 cgs
Temperature	4,702±50 K
Metallicity [Fe/H]	0.09±0.05 dex

Ab
Mass	3.84 M_{☉}

Other designations
- Ainalrami, ν^{1} Sgr, 32 Sgr, BD−22°4907, HD 174974, HIP 92761, HR 7116, SAO 187426, WDS J18542-2245

Database references
SIMBAD	data

Nu^{1} Sagittarii (ν^{1} Sagittarii, abbreviated Nu^{1} Sgr, ν^{1} Sgr) is a triple star system about 1,100 light-years from Earth. The two resolved components are designated Nu^{1} Sagittarii A (officially named Ainalrami /ɛnəlˈreɪmi/, the traditional name for the system), and B. Component A is itself a spectroscopic binary. The system is 0.11 degree north of the ecliptic.

== Nomenclature ==
ν^{1} Sagittarii (Latinised to Nu^{1} Sagittarii) is the system's Bayer designation.

Nu^{1} and Nu^{2} Sagittarii (together designated Nu Sagittarii) bore the traditional name Ain al Rami, which is from the Arabic عين الرامي ʽain al-rāmī meaning 'eye of the archer'. In 2016, the IAU organized a Working Group on Star Names (WGSN) to catalog and standardize proper names for stars. The WGSN decided to attribute proper names to individual stars rather than entire multiple systems. It approved the name Ainalrami for the component Nu^{1} Sagittarii A on 5 September 2017 and it is now so included in the List of IAU-approved Star Names.

Nu^{1} and Nu^{2} Sagittarii, together with Tau Sagittarii, Psi Sagittarii, Omega Sagittarii, 60 Sagittarii and Zeta Sagittarii were Al Udḥiyy, the Ostrich's Nest.

== Properties ==
Nu^{1} Sagittarii Aa is a spectral type K1 bright giant which has an apparent magnitude of +4.86. It is a microvariable with a frequency of 0.43398 cycles per day and an amplitude of 0.0078 magnitude. In 1982 it was found to have a hotter companion, Nu^{1} Sagittarii Ab, a rapidly rotating B9 type star. The pair orbit with a period of around 370 days. A magnitude +11.2 companion, component B, is orbiting further out at an angular separation of 2.5 arcseconds from the primary.

== Observation ==
On 13 February 2008, it was occulted by Jupiter as viewed from East Asia and the Indian Ocean.
