= Chi Sagittarii =

The Bayer designation Chi Sagittarii (χ Sagittarii) is shared by three star systems in the zodiac constellation of Sagittarius. The brightest of these, χ^{1} Sagittarii and χ^{3} Sagittarii, are separated by 0.56° on the sky. The dimmer star χ^{2} Sagittarii is located between them, 0.10° from χ^{1}, and is too faint to be seen with the naked eye. In 1977, the Wow! signal came from the direction of these stars.

- χ^{1} Sagittarii, 47 Sgr, HR 7362
- χ^{2} Sagittarii, 48 Sgr
- χ^{3} Sagittarii, 49 Sgr, HR 7363

== Name and etymology ==
These three χ star, together with φ Sgr, σ Sgr, ζ Sgr and τ Sgr were Al Naʽām al Ṣādirah (النعم السادرة), the Returning Ostriches. According to the catalogue of stars in the Technical Memorandum 33-507 - A Reduced Star Catalog Containing 537 Named Stars, Al Naʽām al Ṣādirah or Namalsadirah was originally the title for four stars: φ Sgr as Namalsadirah I, τ Sgr as Namalsadirah II, χ^{1} Sgr as Namalsadirah III and χ^{2} Sgr as Namalsadirah IV (except σ Sgr and ζ Sgr). In Chinese, 狗 (Gǒu), meaning Dog, refers to an asterism consisting of χ^{1} Sagittarii and 52 Sagittarii. Consequently, χ^{1} Sagittarii itself is known as 狗二 (Gǒu èr, English: the Second Star of Dog.)
