= Nu Sagittarii =

The Bayer designation Nu Sagittarii (Nu Sgr, ν Sagittarii, ν Sgr) is shared by two star systems, ν^{1} Sagittarii and ν^{2} Sagittarii, in the zodiac constellation Sagittarius. The two stars are separated by 0.23° in the sky.

- ν^{1} Sagittarii
- ν^{2} Sagittarii

Nu Sagittarii has the traditional name Ain al Rami, which is from the Arabic عين الرامي ^{c}ain ar-rāmī meaning eye of the archer. Both of the ν stars, together with τ Sgr, ψ Sgr, ω Sgr, 60 Sgr and ζ Sgr were Al Udḥiyy, the Ostrich's Nest. Nu Sagittarii is often cited as one of the earliest identified double stars. In the Almagest, Ptolemy describes the star as "nebulous and double", referring to the double nature of the star.
