= Phi Sagittarii =

Binary star in the constellation Sagittarius

- Location of φ Sagittarii (circled)

Observation data Epoch J2000 Equinox ICRS
- Constellation: Sagittarius
- Right ascension: 18^{h} 45^{m} 39.38610^{s}
- Declination: −26° 59′ 26.7944″
- Apparent magnitude (V): 3.17

Characteristics
- Evolutionary stage: main sequence
- Spectral type: B8.5 III
- U−B color index: −0.36
- B−V color index: −0.11

Astrometry
Radial velocity (R_{v})	+12.66±0.15 km/s
Proper motion (μ)	RA: +50.61 mas/yr Dec.: +1.22 mas/yr
Parallax (π)	12.5±1.0 mas
Distance	261 ± 23 ly (80±7 pc)
Absolute magnitude (M_{V})	−1.16

Orbit
Period (P)	238.844 ± 0.011 days (0.653919 ± 3.0×10^{−5} years)
Semi-major axis (a)	16.44±0.04 mas (1.32±0.10 AU)
Eccentricity (e)	0.418±0.004
Inclination (i)	106.1±0.1°
Longitude of the node (Ω)	53.8±0.1°
Periastron epoch (T)	58,022.3±0.3 JD
Argument of periastron (ω) (secondary)	111.6±0.2°
Semi-amplitude (K_{1}) (primary)	18.8±0.3 km/s

Details

A
Mass	3.8±0.9 M_{☉}
Radius	5.1±0.4 R_{☉}
Luminosity	475 L_{☉}
Surface gravity (log g)	3.5 cgs
Temperature	12,000±250 K
Rotational velocity (v sin i)	39±1 km/s
Age	150 Myr

B
Mass	1.6±0.4 M_{☉}
Radius	1.67±0.15 R_{☉}
Temperature	7,000 K
Age	150 Myr

Other designations
- Nandou, Namalsadirah I, Awal al Sadira, φ Sgr, Phi Sgr, 27 Sagittarii, CPD−27 5241, FK5 1487, GC 25661, HD 173300, HIP 92041, HR 7039, SAO 268859, PPM 297231

Database references
SIMBAD	data

Phi Sagittarii, also named Nandou, is a binary star in the southern constellation of Sagittarius. With an apparent visual magnitude of 3.17, it is the ninth-brightest star in the constellation and is readily visible to the naked eye. Parallax measurements place it at a distance of roughly 261 light-years (80 parsecs) from the Earth. It is receding with a radial velocity of +21.5 km/s.

== Properties ==
The stellar classification of this star has been rated at B8.5 III. While the luminosity class of III is typical of a giant star, evolved away from the main sequence after it has exhausted the hydrogen at its core, evolutionary models find that it is still in the late main sequence. Around 150 million years old, it has 3.8 times the mass of the Sun, 5.1 times the Sun's radius, and is radiating 475 times the Sun's luminosity from its photosphere. This energy is being radiated at an effective temperature of 12000 K, which produces the blue-white hue typical of B-type stars.

This star has been catalogued as a spectroscopic binary and a companion was apparently detected through lunar occultation. However, the latter was pointed out as spurious. Interferometric observations taken in 2017 finally revealed that Phi Sgr is indeed a binary. The companion is a main sequence star around 67% larger and 60% more massive than the Sun, with a temperature of 7,000 K. It was first resolved with a projected separation of 1.31 AU. An orbital solution was presented in 2026, finding an orbital period of 238.844 days (0.65392 years), a semi-major axis of 1.32 AU an inclination of 106.1°, and a considerable orbital eccentricity of 0.418.

The system is expected to evolve into a symbiotic binary after a long process of evolution. As the primary star evolves and expands into a red giant, the orbit will become circular and its surface will engulf the main-sequence secondary, entering a common envelope phase and shortening the binary's orbit. After the common envelope phase, the system will evolve into a close white dwarf plus main sequence configuration. The secondary will start to evolve into a red giant after several million years, causing the system to enter in its symbiotic phase.

== Name and etymology ==
Phi Sagittarii, Latinized from φ Sagittarii, is the star's Bayer designation. This star, together with γ Sgr, δ Sgr, ε Sgr, ζ Sgr, λ Sgr, σ Sgr and τ Sgr comprise the Teapot asterism.

In Chinese astronomy, 斗 (Dǒu), meaning Dipper, refers to an asterism consisting of φ Sagittarii, λ Sagittarii, μ Sagittarii, σ Sagittarii, τ Sagittarii and ζ Sagittarii. Consequently, the Chinese name for φ Sagittarii itself is 斗宿一 (Dǒu Xiù yī, English: the First Star of Dipper.) This is one of the Twenty-Eight Mansions, also known as Nándǒu (南斗), meaning Southern Dipper. The IAU Working Group on Star Names adopted the name Nandou for φ Sagittarii on 13 August 2026, after this Chinese constellation.

φ Sgr, σ Sgr, ζ Sgr, χ Sgr and τ Sgr were the Arabic Al Naʽām al Ṣādirah (النعم السادرة), the Returning Ostriches. In the catalogue of stars in the Calendarium of Al Achsasi al Mouakket, this star was designated Aoul al Sadirah, which was translated into Latin as Prima τού al Sadirah, meaning first returning ostrich. In the catalogue of stars in the Technical Memorandum 33-507 - A Reduced Star Catalog Containing 537 Named Stars, Al Naʽām al Ṣādirah or Namalsadirah was used as the title for four stars: φ Sgr as Namalsadirah I, τ Sgr as Namalsadirah II, χ^{1} Sgr as Namalsadirah III and χ^{2} Sgr as Namalsadirah IV (except σ Sgr and ζ Sgr).
