= Warida =

Warida or Al Warida is an asterism of the Arabs. In the star catalogue of Al Achsasi al Mouakket, four stars are mentioned as belonging to it: Gamma Sagittarii, Delta Sagittarii, Epsilon Sagittarii and Eta Sagittarii. The name is short for Arabic النعامة الواردة Al Naʽāma al Wārida, meaning "the ostrich going down to the water". This ostrich was thought of as going down to the river (the Milky Way) to drink, and another ostrich (σ, φ, τ, and ζ Sagittarii, al Sadira) was thought of as coming back up.
