= Sigma Sagittarii =

Second brightest star in the constellation Sagittarius

- Location of σ Sagittarii (circled)

Observation data Epoch J2000 Equinox ICRS
- Constellation: Sagittarius
- Right ascension: 18^{h} 55^{m} 15.92650^{s}
- Declination: −26° 17′ 48.2068″
- Apparent magnitude (V): +2.05

Characteristics
- Spectral type: B2.5 V
- U−B color index: −0.761
- B−V color index: −0.204

Astrometry
Radial velocity (R_{v})	−11.2 km/s
Proper motion (μ)	RA: +15.14 mas/yr Dec.: −53.43 mas/yr
Parallax (π)	14.32±0.29 mas
Distance	224.7 ± 9.8 ly (68.9±3.0 pc)
Absolute magnitude (M_{V})	−2.17

Orbit
Period (P)	134.779±0.025 days
Semi-major axis (a)	(18.0±0.2)×10^{−3}" (1.26±0.05 au)
Eccentricity (e)	0.492±0.003
Inclination (i)	19.7±1.9°
Longitude of the node (Ω)	45.9±8.0°
Periastron epoch (T)	48,588.1±2.2 MJD
Argument of periastron (ω) (secondary)	76.4±7.1°

Details

Aa
Mass	6.5±0.2 M_{☉}
Radius	4.1±0.5 R_{☉}
Surface gravity (log g)	4.0 cgs
Temperature	18,500 K
Rotational velocity (v sin i)	165 km/s
Age	31.4±0.4 Myr

Ab
Mass	6.3±0.2 M_{☉}
Radius	3.9±0.5 R_{☉}
Surface gravity (log g)	4.0 cgs
Temperature	18,500 K
Rotational velocity (v sin i)	160 km/s
Age	30 Myr

Other designations
- Nunki, Sadira, σ Sgr, Sigma Sgr, 34 Sagittarii, CD−26 13595, CPD−27 5241, FK5 706, GC 25941, HD 175191, HIP 92855, HR 7121, SAO 187448, PPM 269078, CCDM J18552-2618A, WDS J18553-2618Aa,Ab

Database references
SIMBAD	data

Sigma Sagittarii, Latinized from σ Sagittarii; formally named Nunki /ˈnʌŋki/, is the second-brightest star in the constellation of Sagittarius. It is a binary star system, viewed as a single star of combined apparent magnitude +2.05, about the same brightness as Saiph in Orion. The distance to this system, determined using a dynamical parallax measurement, is 225 light-years (68.9 parsecs).

It is 3.45 degrees south of the ecliptic, so it can be occulted by the Moon and rarely by planets. The last occultation by a planet took place on November 17, 1981, when it was occulted by Venus.

== Properties ==
Sigma Sagittarii has a spectrum matching a stellar classification of B2.5 V, which indicates its components are B-type main-sequence stars. X-ray emission has been detected from this star, which has an estimated X-ray luminosity of 1.2 × 10^{28} erg s^{−1}.

The two component stars have masses of 6.5 and 6.3 solar masses (M_{☉}) and radii of 4.1 and 3.9 solar radii (R_{☉}), respectively. The effective temperature of both components is about 18,500 K, over three times the Sun's effective temperature of 5,772 K. They take 134.779 days to complete an orbit, following a moderately eccentric path with e = 0.492 and an orbital semi-major axis of 1.26 astronomical units (au), implying a periastron of 0.64 au. There is strong evidence that the orbit, which is inclined at 20° relative to Earth, is misaligned with the stellar spin axes. The age of the system is estimated at about 30 million years.

Nunki is the nearest star expected to explode in a core-collapse supernova. 25 million years in the future, the primary star will evolve to a red giant, fill its roche lobe, and start to transfer mass to the secondary star. This will result in the system merging into a single star of over 10 solar masses, a mass sufficient to explode as a supernova.

The binary nature of Sigma Sagittarii was uncovered in 1974 with interferometric observations, which found the components to have a magnitude difference of 0.46. Interferometric data published in 1994 partially resolved the system, finding a separation of 11.5 milliarcseconds under the assumption of equally bright components. Spectroscopic observations in 2007-2008 hinted at the presence of a yet unseen stellar companion with a possible orbital period of 6.8 days, estimated to have a mass of 1.2±0.2 M_{☉} and a temperature of 6,100 K, but follow-up observations in 2016 by the same authors did not confirm this. Interferometric observations published in 2025 again found Nunki to be a close binary of similar components, which were detected at an angular separation of 8.644 milliarcseconds. There is a 10th magnitude optical companion located 5.2 arcminutes away, but this is an unrelated background star.

== Nomenclature ==
σ Sagittarii (Latinised to Sigma Sagittarii) is the star's Bayer designation. In his Uranometria star atlas, Johann Bayer placed this star in the fourth magnitude class, although it is a second-magnitude star by modern measurements.

It bore the traditional name of Nunki, which was an Assyrian or Babylonian name recovered by archaeologists and popularized by R. H. Allen, though it is now thought that this name originally referred to an asterism in the area of Vela. The name Nunki is of Sumerian origin and, in the Sumerian written form NUN^{KI} (‘'Divine Place of the Earth’'), is the name of the ancient holy city Eridu, seat of the great underground freshwater ocean Apzu. In Sumerian, the star Canopus was called MUL.NUN^{KI}, which translates to “Star of the City of Eridu” and can be linked to this star becoming visible after the city’s founding due to the precession of the Earth’s axis.

In 2016, the International Astronomical Union organized a Working Group on Star Names (WGSN) to catalogue and standardize proper names for stars. The WGSN approved the name Nunki for this star on 21 August 2016 and it is now so included in the List of IAU-approved Star Names.

This star, together with:

- Gamma Sagittarii, Delta Sagittarii, Epsilon Sagittarii, Zeta Sagittarii, Lambda Sagittarii, Tau Sagittarii and Phi Sagittarii, comprised the Teapot asterism.
- Phi Sagittarii, Zeta Sagittarii, Chi Sagittarii and Tau Sagittarii were the Arabic Al Naʽām al Ṣādirah (النعم السادرة), the Returning Ostriches.
- Zeta Sagittarii and Pi Sagittarii may have been the Akkadian Gu-shi-rab‑ba, the Yoke of the Sea.

In the catalogue of stars in the Calendarium of Al Achsasi al Mouakket, this star was designated Thanih al Sadirah, which was translated into Latin as Secunda τού al Sadirah, meaning second returning ostrich.

In Chinese, 斗 (Dǒu), meaning Dipper, refers to an asterism consisting of Sigma Sagittarii, Phi Sagittarii, Lambda Sagittarii, Mu Sagittarii, Tau Sagittarii and Zeta Sagittarii. Consequently, the Chinese name for Sigma Sagittarii itself is 斗宿四 (Dǒu Xiù sì, English: the Fourth Star of Dipper.)

== See also ==
- Spica – Second-closest star that will explode in a core-collapse supernova.
