= NGC 6644 =

Bipolar planetary nebula

Nebula
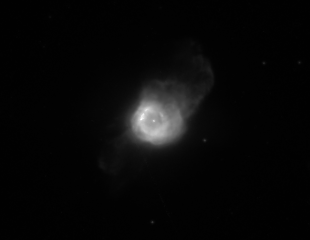
- NGC 6644, as seen by the Hubble Space Telescope

Observation data: J2000 epoch
- Right ascension: 18^{h} 32^{m} 34.73^{s}
- Declination: −25° 07′ 45.7″
- Distance: 20,000 ly
- Apparent dimensions (V): 0.20'

Physical characteristics
- Absolute magnitude (V): 10.7

NGC 6644 is a bipolar planetary nebula located in the constellation Sagittarius. NGC 6644 was discovered by American astronomer Edward Charles Pickering in 1880. With an apparent visual magnitude of 10.7, a telescope with an aperture of at least 150 millimeters must be used to observe it. The nebula is located about 1.1 degrees northeast of the star Lambda Sagittarii. According to the most recent studies (2010), the distance of NGC 6644 is 6.131 ± 1.226 kpc (~20,000 light-years).

== See also ==
- List of planetary nebulae
