= Epsilon Sagittarii =

Binary star in the constellation Sagittarius

ε Sagittarii
- Location of ε Sagittarii (circled)

Observation data Epoch J2000 Equinox ICRS
- Constellation: Sagittarius
- Right ascension: 18^{h} 24^{m} 10.31840^{s}
- Declination: −34° 23′ 04.6193″
- Apparent magnitude (V): +1.85

Characteristics
- Evolutionary stage: Post-mass transfer
- Spectral type: B9IVp
- U−B color index: +0.13
- B−V color index: –0.03

Astrometry
Radial velocity (R_{v})	−15 km/s
Proper motion (μ)	RA: −39.42 mas/yr Dec.: −124.20 mas/yr
Parallax (π)	22.76±0.24 mas
Distance	143 ± 2 ly (43.9 ± 0.5 pc)
Absolute magnitude (M_{V})	−1.41

Details

ε Sgr A
Mass	3.80 M_{☉}
Radius	8.80 (equatorial); 6.01 (polar) R_{☉}
Luminosity	497 L_{☉}
Surface gravity (log g)	3.46 (polar); 2.00 (equatorial) cgs
Temperature	11,720 (polar); 7,433 (equatorial) K
Rotation	1.61 days
Rotational velocity (v sin i)	236 km/s
Age	232 Myr

ε Sgr B
Mass	0.95 M_{☉}
Radius	0.93 (Note: Calculated, using the Stefan-Boltzmann law and the star's effective temperature and luminosity, with respect to the solar nominal effective temperature of 5,772 K: $$\sqrt{\biggl(\frac{5,772}{5,808}\biggr)^4 \cdot 10^{-0.05}} = 0.932\ R_\odot.$$) R_{☉}
Luminosity	0.891 L_{☉}
Temperature	5,808 K

Other designations
- Kaus Australis, ε Sagittarii, ε Sgr, Epsilon Sgr, 20 Sagittarii, CCDM J18242-3423A, FK5 689, GC 25100, HD 169022, HIP 90185, HR 6879, IDS 18175-3427 A, PPM 297655, SAO 210091, WDS J18242-3423A

Database references
SIMBAD	data

Epsilon Sagittarii (Latinised from ε Sagittarii, abbreviated Epsilon Sgr, ε Sgr), formally named Kaus Australis /ˈkɔːs ɔːˈstreɪlɪs/, is a binary star system in the southern zodiac constellation of Sagittarius. The apparent visual magnitude of +1.85 makes it the brightest star in Sagittarius. Based upon parallax measurements, this star is around 143 light-years (44 parsecs) from the Sun.

== Observation ==
Epsilon Sagittarii can best be viewed in the month of August. The star is at least 10 degrees away from the ecliptic, and the Sun passes it overhead around December 25-26th. The star is visible from late January to late November from mid-northern latitudes. From mid-southern latitudes, the star is visible from early January until the middle of December. The star is not visible in areas above 55°N latitude. From latitudes below 55°S, Epsilon Sagittarii is a circumpolar star.

== Stellar system ==
The primary star, ε Sagittarii A, of this binary star system has a stellar classification of B9.5IVp, with the luminosity class of IV suggesting it has a luminosity comparable to a subgiant star for its spectral type. It is suggested that chemical peculiarities in the spectrum may indicate a λ Boötis star. It has about 3.8 times the mass of the Sun and is radiating around 500 times the Sun's luminosity from its photosphere.

Epsilon Sagittarii A is spinning rapidly with a projected rotational velocity of 236 km s^{−1}. This rapid rotation give the star an oblate shape, with its equatorial circumference being 34% larger than its polar circumference. The effective temperature across the star's surface varies as well, from 7,433 K in the equator to 11,720 K in the poles. At its equator, it is rotating at 95% of its critical (breakup) velocity, the highest rate ever measured for a star in the Milky Way. It also possesses a gaseous equatorial decretion disk. Its unusually rapid rotation is incompatible with stellar evolution models, and thus Epsilon Sagittarii is more likely the result of mass transfer of two stars previously in a binary system.

It has a magnetic field with a strength in the range 10.5–130.5 Gauss and it is an X-ray source with a luminosity of about 10^{30} erg s^{−1}. The system displays an excess emission of infrared radiation, which would suggest the presence of a circumstellar disk of dust, but these claims were later found to be doubtful.

=== Companion stars ===
As of 2001, the secondary star, ε Sagittarii B, is located at an angular separation of 2.392 arcseconds from the primary along a position angle of 142.3°. At the distance of this system, this angle is equivalent to a physical separation of about 106 AU. It is likely to be a main sequence star with about 95% of the mass of the Sun.

The system has a higher optical linear polarisation than expected for its distance from the Sun; this has been attributed to light scattered off the disk from the secondary, but a more recent analysis suggests that it is caused by the presence of a gas disk around the primary. Prior to its 1993 identification using an adaptive optics coronagraph, this companion may have been responsible for the spectral anomalies that were attributed to the primary star.

At least two further companions have been listed for Epsilon Sagittarii. There is a 14th-magnitude star (UCAC3 112-415471) at an angular separation of 32.3 arcseconds, but it has a much smaller parallax and so is likely to be a background object. HD 169178 is a 9th-magnitude star separated from Epsilon Sagittarii by 14′; it has a similar parallax and proper motion and is listed in the Washington Double Star Catalog as a companion.

== Nomenclature ==
ε Sagittarii (Latinised to Epsilon Sagittarii) is the star system's Bayer designation.

It bore the traditional name Kaus Australis, which derived from the Arabic قوس qaws 'bow' and Latin austrālis 'southern'. In 2016, the International Astronomical Union organized a Working Group on Star Names (WGSN) to catalog and standardize proper names for stars. The WGSN's first bulletin of July 2016 included a table of the first two batches of names approved by the WGSN; which included Kaus Australis for the star ε Sagittarii A.

In the catalogue of stars in the Calendarium of Al Achsasi al Mouakket, this star was designated Thalath al Waridah, or Thalith al Waridah, meaning 'third of Warida'.

In Chinese, 箕 (Jī), meaning Winnowing Basket, refers to an asterism consisting of Epsilon Sagittarii, Gamma Sagittarii, Delta Sagittarii and Eta Sagittarii. Consequently, the Chinese name for Epsilon Sagittarii itself is 箕宿三 (Jī Sù sān, English: the Third Star of Winnowing Basket.)

This star, together with:

- Gamma Sagittarii, Delta Sagittarii, Zeta Sagittarii, Lambda Sagittarii, Sigma Sagittarii, Tau Sagittarii and Phi Sagittarii, comprise the Teapot asterism.
- Gamma Sagittarii, Delta Sagittarii and Eta Sagittarii were Al Naʽām al Wārid (النعم الوارد), the 'Going Ostriches'.
- Gamma Sagittarii and Delta Sagittarii were Akkadian Sin-nun‑tu, or Si-nu-nu‑tum, 'the Swallow'.

Kaus Australis is listed in the Babylonian compendium MUL.APIN as MA.GUR_{8}, meaning "the Bark".

The Kalapalo people of Mato Grosso state in Brazil called this star and λ Scorpii, through ι Scorpii, θ Scorpii, ν Scorpii, υ Scorpii and ρ Scorpii Taugi kusugu, "Taugi's fishing basket".
