= Tau Sagittarii =

Orange-hued giant star in the constellation Sagittarius

τ Sagittarii
- Location of τ Sagittarii (circled)

Observation data Epoch J2000.0 Equinox ICRS
- Constellation: Sagittarius
- Right ascension: 19^{h} 06^{m} 56.40897^{s}
- Declination: −27° 40′ 13.5189″
- Apparent magnitude (V): +3.326

Characteristics
- Evolutionary stage: red clump
- Spectral type: K1 III
- U−B color index: +1.185
- B−V color index: +1.170

Astrometry
Radial velocity (R_{v})	+45.4 km/s
Proper motion (μ)	RA: −50.61 mas/yr Dec.: −249.80 mas/yr
Parallax (π)	28.3195±0.3134 mas
Distance	115 ± 1 ly (35.3 ± 0.4 pc)
Absolute magnitude (M_{V})	0.48

Details
Mass	1.25 M_{☉}
Radius	15.71 R_{☉}
Luminosity	87.6 L_{☉}
Surface gravity (log g)	2.15 cgs
Temperature	4,459 K
Metallicity [Fe/H]	−0.27 dex
Rotational velocity (v sin i)	1.04 km/s
Age	7.91 Gyr

Other designations
- Namalsadirah 2, Rabi al Sadira, τ Sagittarii, τ Sgr, Tau Sgr, 40 Sagittarii, CPD−27°6617, FK5 1496, GC 26291, HD 177716, HIP 93864, HR 7234, PPM 269078, SAO 187683

Database references
SIMBAD	data

Tau Sagittarii (Tau Sgr, τ Sagittarii, τ Sgr) is a star in the southern zodiac constellation of Sagittarius.

== Description ==
With an apparent visual magnitude of +3.3, this is one of the brighter members of the constellation. The distance of this star from Earth is roughly 122 light-years (37 parsecs), based upon parallax measurements.

This is a spectral type K1 giant star with about 1.25 M_{☉}. The stellar envelope is slightly cooler than the Sun with an effective temperature of 4,459 K, giving the star a light orange color. The interferometry-measured angular diameter of this star, after correcting for limb darkening, is 3.93 ± 0.04 mas, which, at its estimated distance, equates to a physical radius of about 16 times the radius of the Sun.

τ Sagittarii is a suspected double star although no companion has been confirmed yet. A lower metal content (Fe to H ratio is 54% lower than the sun's) and a high peculiar velocity (64 km/s, four times the local average) relative to the Sun suggest the star is a visitor from a different part of the Galaxy.

τ Sagittarii is a red clump giant, a star with a similar mass to the sun which has exhausted its core hydrogen, passed through the red giant branch, and started helium fusion in its core.

== Name and etymology ==
- The star forms part of simple asterisms:
  - γ Sgr, τ Sgr, δ Sgr, ε Sgr, ζ Sgr, λ Sgr, σ Sgr and φ Sgr — the Teapot.
  - φ Sgr, τ Sgr, ζ Sgr, χ Sgr (double) and σ Sgr — the Returning Ostriches; in Arabic Al Naʽām al Ṣādirah often transliterated as Namalsadirah (النعم السادرة).
    - Originally four stars in a numerical order: φ Sgr, τ Sgr, χ^{1} Sgr and χ^{2} Sgr
  - ν Sgr, τ Sgr, ψ Sgr, ω Sgr, 60 Sgr and ζ Sgr, Al Udḥiyy — the Ostrich's Nest.
  - In the entirely separate Chinese tradition — 斗 (Dǒu), meaning Dipper: τ Sgr, φ Sgr, λ Sgr, μ Sgr, σ Sgr and ζ Sgr. The star itself is 斗宿五 (Dǒu Xiù wǔ, English: the Dipper's fifth star).
