= Kuromukuro =

Japanese anime television series

- Promotional image, which features Kennosuke Tokisada Ouma, Yukina Shirahane and Sophie Noël in the foreground, and the Black Relic in the background

クロムクロ
- Genre: Mecha
- Anime television series
- Directed by: Tensai Okamura
- Produced by: Hirotaka Kaneko; Jun Fukuda; Kenji Horikawa; Mika Shimizu; Takayuki Nagatani; Takema Okamura; Toshiyasu Hayashi; Yasushi Ōshima
- Written by: Ryō Higaki
- Music by: Hiroaki Tsutsumi
- Studio: P.A. Works
- Licensed by: Netflix (global streaming rights); NA: Ponycan USA
- Original network: AT-X, Tokyo MX, BS11, Sun TV, KBS, TUT
- Original run: April 7, 2016 – September 29, 2016
- Episodes: 26
- Light novel

Kuromukuro: A Ghost at a Speed of 290,000 Kilometers per Second
- Written by: Ryo Higaki
- Illustrated by: Yuriko Ishii
- Published by: P.A. Books
- Original run: June 1, 2018 – November 2018
- Volumes: 7
- icon

Kuromukuro (クロムクロ) is a Japanese mecha anime television series produced by P.A. Works, directed by Tensai Okamura and written by Ryō Higaki, with character designs by Yuriko Ishii and music by Hiroaki Tsutsumi. The series was produced to celebrate P.A. Works' 15th anniversary. It follows a student of Tateyama International High School named Yukina Shirahane and a young samurai named Kennosuke Tokisada Ouma, who was born in the Sengoku period and reawakened in the present day inside a mysterious artifact called the Cube. When an extraterrestrial force called Efi Dorg invades Earth with a mission to collect all the fragments of an artifact called the Pivot Stone in order to achieve planet domination, Kennosuke pilots a stolen Efi Dorg mecha dubbed the Black Relic, with Yukina biometrically synchronized as the navigator due to an accident. Along with the help of the defense forces of the United Nations Kurobe Laboratory, the two fight back to prevent the mission of Efi Dorg from being accomplished. The series premiered on April 7, 2016, on Japanese TV channel AT-X while Netflix acquired exclusive rights for streaming worldwide.

== Plot ==
450 years prior to the present, an extraterrestrial force called Efi Dorg invades Earth; the people of Sengoku era Japan dub their mecha and robotic drones as oni. The Washiba Clan falls victim to them, but clan heir Yukihime and her samurai retainer Kennosuke Tokisada Ouma fight back with a stolen Efi Dorg mecha, which they dub the "Black Relic" (黒骸, Kuromukuro). They succeed in vanquishing their foes, but when the Black Relic is caught in an enemy explosion, Yukihime disappears.

60 years ago, the Black Relic is unearthed during the construction of the Kurobe Dam. In the present day, the United Nations Kurobe Laboratory is researching it when Efi Dorg returns. Yukina Shirahane, daughter of the United Nations Kurobe Laboratory director, accidentally reactivates the cockpit module of the Black Relic, releasing Kennosuke from cryostasis. Aided by Yukina's family and the United Nations Kurobe Laboratory in adjusting to life in the 21st century, he stands against Efi Dorg's invasion of Earth just as he did in his home era. As the Black Relic is the most effective weapon the United Nations Kurobe Laboratory has against Efi Dorg technology, Kennosuke becomes one of their most valuable assets. Due to an accident, Yukina is biometrically synchronized with the Black Relic, and as it requires a pilot and a navigator, Yukina thus becomes Kennosuke's combat partner.

== Characters ==
=== Main characters ===
Kennosuke Tokisada Ouma (青馬 剣之介 時貞, Ouma Kennosuke Tokisada)
Voiced by: Yōhei Azakami (Japanese); Bryce Papenbrook (English)
Kennosuke is a young man born in the Sengoku period and awoke in the present day from the "Cube", the control unit of the "Black Relic" found in the Kurobe Dam construction site. In order to protect Yukihime, he fought demons using a stolen alien robot he calls the Black Relic, a humanoid mecha controlled by two people, that only he can pilot and Yukina can navigate. He is the same age as Yukina and despite his initial confusion with the modern world, he befriends Yukina's family.
Yukina Shirahane (白羽 由希奈, Shirahane Yukina)
Voiced by: Mao Ichimichi (Japanese); Cherami Leigh (English)
Yukina is a second-year high school student of Tateyama International High School, and her mother is the head of United Nations Kurobe Laboratory. She dreams of going to Mars. Because of the disappearance of her father, she feels insecure about her future and dislikes the idea of having to fight, especially if the enemy looks human. She is identical to Yukihime and later Muetta, causing Kennosuke much confusion.
Muetta (ムエッタ)
Voiced by: Aki Toyosaki (Japanese); Kira Buckland (English)
Muetta is another Efi Dorg pilot who is a clone of Yukihime, grown using her DNA aboard an Efi Dorg ship according to Efi Dorg's attitude to create on-site its own troops by cloning conquered foes. Her geoframe is designated "Medusa" (メドゥーサ, Medūsa) by the UN. She is stabbed by Mirasa and barely survives. She eventually helps Kennosuke save Yukina from Efi Dorg.
Sophie Noël (ソフィー・ノエル, Sofī Noeru)
Voiced by: Reina Ueda (Japanese); Melissa Fahn (English)
Sophie is a French exchange student who is an Iaido-practicing samurai-otaku and a member of France's elite forces, the GIGN. Despite her petite frame, she's a master of judo. Sophie is a prodigy with operating robots and is even a test pilot at the UN Kurobe Laboratory.

=== United Nations Kurobe Laboratory ===
Hiromi Shirahane (白羽 洋海, Shirahane Hiromi)
Voiced by: Kanako Tōjō (Japanese); Anne Yatco (English)
Yukina's mother and the Chief Researcher at the UN Kurobe Laboratory. She was lead designer of the currently under development "GAUS (Gravity Attenuated Upright Shell)", units that are two-seater mecha operated by a pilot and navigator. She's quite the overbearing mother type, but lacking in motherly qualities.
Tom Borden (トム・ボーデン, Tomu Bōden)
Voiced by: Ryohei Kimura (Japanese); Todd Haberkorn (English)
The 31-year old pilot of GAUS 1 and a member of the U.S. Marines. Though he has a rough personality, Tom is the combat leader of the GAUS pilots. During the counterattack against Efi Dorg he becomes the pilot of the Longarm.
Liu Shenmei (劉 神美, Ryū Shenmii)
Voiced by: Hikaru Ueda (Japanese); Reba Buhr (English)
The 27-year old navigator of GAUS 1. A very reserved person, Shenmei speaks little and helps to balance Tom's headstrong nature. She later becomes the pilot of GAUS 3.
Toshiyuki "Sebastian" Mozumi (茂住 敏幸 (セバスチャン), Mozumi Toshiyuki (Sebasuchan))
Voiced by: Taiten Kusunoki (Japanese); Tony Azzolino (English)
The 38-year old navigator of GAUS 2. A captain in the JSDF, Sebastian is Sophie's butler. During Efi Dorg's largest assault, he sacrifices himself in an attempt to kill Mirasa and prevent her from attacking Muetta and Sophie, but despite being able to stop Mirasa, she manages to survive. It is later revealed that he also survived as well.
Minoru Aramata (荒俣 稔, Aramata Minoru)
Voiced by: Kōichi Makishima (Japanese); Michael McConnohie (English)
Chief Engineer at the UN Kurobe Laboratory. He is an expert on solid state physics and geology, and was in charge of excavating the artifact.
Arthur Graham (アーサー・グラハム, Āsā Gurahamu)
Voiced by: Katsuyuki Konishi (Japanese); Jamieson Price (English)
Commander of the defense forces at UN Kurobe Laboratory. A Major in the British Army and former member of SAS, Graham is earnest in his work and not just out for promotions.
Rita Ferreira Mendes (リタ・フェレイラ・メンデス, Rita Fereira Mendesu)
Voiced by: Lynn (Japanese); Christine Marie Cabanos (English)
Operator in the defense control room. Rita wears glasses and has a positive demeanor. After having been possessed by an electronic parasite, she cooperates with other controlled humans in activate the Pivot Stone; she's freed when the UN forces manage to retake the UN Kurobe Laboratory, but since the humans do not have the necessary technology to reverse the parasites' influence she remains in a vegetative state till 2021, when she seems return to herself much to the surprise of her friend Beth.
Elizabeth "Beth" Butler (エリザベス・バトラー (ベス), Erizabesu Batorā (Besu))
Voiced by: Juri Kimura (Japanese); Julie Maddalena (English)
Operator in the defense control room. She's big in height and heart.
Paula Kowalczyk (ポーラ・コヴァルチック, Pōra Kovaruchikku)
Voiced by: Rina Satō (Japanese); Laura Post (English)
A researcher in the development division at the UN Kurobe Laboratory. She has a PhD in material engineering and makes use of technology reverse-engineered from the Black Relic.
Girolamo "Giro" Casiraghi (ジローラモ・カシラギ (ジロー), Jirōramo Kashiragi (Jirō))
Voiced by: Hiromichi Tezuka (Japanese); Keith Silverstein (English)
A researcher in the examination division at the UN Kurobe Laboratory. He has a PhD in electrical engineering and analyzes the Black Relic.
Jules Hausen (ジュール・ハウゼン, Jūru Hauzen)
Voiced by: Yuya Uchida (Japanese); Dave Mallow (English)
An expert on anatomy and biochemistry. He is bizarrely obsessed with his research subjects.

=== Tateyama International High School ===
Marina Unami (宇波 茉莉奈, Unami Marina)
Voiced by: Manami Sugihira (Japanese); Dorothy Fahn (English)
A 23-year old school nurse and student counselor at Yukina's high school. She is dedicated to the well-being of her charges.
Naoki Takekuma (武隈 直樹, Takekuma Naoki)
Voiced by: Hidenobu Kiuchi (Japanese); Kyle McCarley (English)
Yukina's homeroom teacher. Takekuma is a stick in the mud who does not mince words.
Mika Ogino (荻布 美夏, Ogino Mika)
Voiced by: Asami Seto (Japanese); Cristina Vee (English)
Mika is Yukina's classmate and childhood friend. A consistently upbeat person, her hobby is cosplay.
Jundai Kayahara (茅原 純大, Kayahara Jundai)
Voiced by: Yūsuke Kobayashi (Japanese); Griffin Burns (English)
Yukina's classmate who always carrying a camera around. He often tries to get into the heart of action, disregarding his own safety.
José Carlos Takasuka (ホセ・カルロス・高須賀, Hose Karurosu Takasuka)
Voiced by: Shunsuke Takeuchi (Japanese); Grant George (English)
Yukina's classmate who dislikes the chaos brought on by the arrival of Efi Dorg and the Black Relic. He is half Spanish and half Japanese, but he only speaks Japanese.
Ryoto Akagi (赤城 涼斗, Akagi Ryōto)
Voiced by: Kaito Ishikawa (Japanese); Johnny Yong Bosch (English)
A classmate of Yukina with a reputation as a delinquent, who has a crush on Yukina. His father is head of maintenance at the UN Kurobe Laboratory.

=== Shirahane Family ===
Takehito Shirahane (白羽 岳人, Shirahane Takehito)
Voiced by: Tōru Ōkawa (Japanese); Doug Erholtz (English)
Yukina's father. He correctly deduced that the Ogres of legend were in fact extraterrestrial beings, but he mysteriously disappeared eight years ago. Zell revealed that they became friends and vowed to work together to stop Efi Dorg, but tragically he died in a snowstorm before Zell could help him.
Koharu Shirahane (白羽 小春, Shirahane Koharu)
Voiced by: Momo Asakura (Japanese); Cassandra Lee Morris (English)
Yukina's younger sister and a third-year in elementary school. She lives with Yukina at their uncle's temple. Koharu likes watching historical dramas on TV and looks up to Kennosuke.
Yakushi (薬師)
Voiced by: Tetsuo Gotō (Japanese); Josiah Wills (English)
Hiromi's older brother. He's a Buddhist monk and looks after his nieces while his sister is constantly at work.

=== Efi Dorg ===
Efi Dorg (エフィドルグ, Efidorugu) is an extraterrestrial organization which invaded Earth 450 years ago, and in the present day, its Gezon-Reco Company arrives to follow up on the scout force's progress. With the self-proclaimed mission of "civilizing the galaxy", Gezon-Reco Company's members call themselves "border reform officers". When asked by a UN official if Efi Dorg conquered, Fusunani considered it an acceptable description on the basis of reality operating on the principle of survival of the fittest, with the weak serving the strong.

Lefil (レフィル, Refiru)
Voiced by: Atsushi Ono (Japanese); Michael McConnohie (English)
The leader of Efi Dorg's Gezon-Reco Company. He's revealed to be a clone of the same species as Zell. He's stabbed and brainwashed by Zell into stopping the Kururu from activating, but informs that if the Kururu isn't stopped, a new, larger Gezon-Reco Company will arrive.
Mirasa (ミラーサ, Mirāsa)
Voiced by: Yuina Yamada (Japanese); Julie Ann Taylor (English)
An ambitious Efi Dorg soldier who prioritizes personal achievement over the welfare of her comrades and Efi Dorg's combat principles. Her geoframe is designated "Spider" (スパイダー, Supaidā) by the UN. She tries to kill Muetta to get the glory only for herself. During Efi Dorg's largest assault, she tries to finish Muetta, only for Sebastian to sacrifice himself to stop her. She's killed during the counterattack by Muetta.
Yoruba (ヨルバ)
Voiced by: Kishō Taniyama (Japanese); Doug Erholtz (English)
An aggressive pilot of Efi Dorg. His geoframe is designated Bluebird by the UN. He is defeated by Kennosuke in the finale battle with help from Zell and Sophie, and is taken prisoner afterward. Muetta asks for his help in defeating Efi Dorg, but he calls her a traitor and turns her down, and it is unknown what happened to him after that.
Imusa (イムサ)
Voiced by: Tooru Sakurai (Japanese); Keith Silverstein (English)
A bald-headed pilot of Efi Dorg. His geoframe is designated Rockhead by the UN. During the counterattack Lefil combines his geoframe with his, but both are defeated by the teamwork of Kennosuke, Yukina, Sophie, Tom and Muetta and while Lefil manages to escape, he dies in the destruction of the geoframe.
Fusunani (フスナーニ, Fusunāni)
Voiced by: Kōji Yusa (Japanese); Christopher Corey Smith (English)
The second seen Efi Dorg pilot. His geoframe is designated "Longarm" (ロングアーム, Ronguāmu) by the UN. After being defeated by Kennosuke he is taken prisoner by the UN, but this is a ruse for him to escape custody in search of a Pivot Stone underneath the Kurobe Dam facility. Kennosuke realizes that he looks identical to a Washiba Clan samurai captain whom he once met, but when confronted, Fusnani denies any notion of being from Earth. After Fusunani is cornered by UN forces, he tries to kill Yukina to render the Black Relic useless, but he is then killed by Kennosuke. Like Muetta, he too is probably a clone created by the Washiba samurai's DNA to serve in the Efi Dorg invasion force.
Hedo (ヒドゥ, Hidu)
Voiced by: Hideki Nakanishi (Japanese); Grant George (English)
The first seen Efi Dorg pilot. His geoframe is designated "Yellow Crab" (イエロークラブ, Ierōkurabu) by the UN. Kennosuke uses the Black Relic to defeat him once, severing Yellow Crab's right arm, but Hedo returns with a replacement arm for his mecha. After being defeated a second time, Hedo emerges from his mecha to acknowledge the prowess of the Black Relic's operator and to ask why they betrayed Efi Dorg. Receiving no answer due to Kennosuke's shock at his human appearance, Hedo proceeds to commit suicide by detonating Yellow Crab.

=== Other characters ===
Yukihime (雪姫)
Voiced by: Aki Toyosaki (Japanese); Kira Buckland (English)
The final heiress of the Washiba Clan. When Efi Dorg invaded Sengoku era Japan, Yukihime enlisted Kennosuke to operate the Black Relic with her to stand against the invaders. However, the Black Relic was eventually caught in an explosion, during which Yukihime died and Kennosuke lost his memory.
Zelleager "Zell" Myundef Vishrai (ゼルイーガー・ミュンデフ・ビシュライ (ゼル), Zeruigā Myundefu Bishurai (Zeru)) / Demon (鬼, Oni)
Voiced by: Shigenori Sōya (Japanese); Christopher Corey Smith (English)
Zell is an alien from a planet located 220 light-years away from Earth in Chi-one Sagittarii, a binary star system in the zodiac constellation of Sagittarius. His species is red-skinned, horned, and has centuries-long lifespans. Zell's planet was conquered by the Efi Dorg, and he wanted to prevent Earth from facing the same fate. Arriving in Japan 450 years ago, he attempted to stop the Efi Dorg force which massacred the Washiba Clan, but the humans believed he was a demon and attacked him. In the recent past, Yukina's father Takehito Shirahane met him and attempted to assist his cause. Takehito also gave him the name Zell as a shortened form of his full name. In the present day, he has come to the aid of UN forces in order to counter Efi Dorg's invasion.

== Media ==
=== Anime ===
Kuromukuro is directed by Tensai Okamura and produced by P.A. Works, spanning 26 episodes. It began airing on April 7, 2016. The series is written by Ryō Higaki, with character designs by Yuriko Ishii and music by Hiroaki Tsutsumi. For the first 13 episodes, the opening theme is "Deathtopia" (デストピア, Desutopia) by Glay, and the ending theme is "Reali.stic" (リアリ・スティック, Riari Stikku) by Michi. For the remaining 13 episodes, the opening theme is "Chō Onsoku Destiny" (超音速デスティニー, lit. Supersonic Destiny) by Glay, and the ending theme is "Eien Loop" (永遠ループ, lit. Eternal Loop) by Ami Wajima.

At the end of episodes 1 through 25, a short narration given by Yukina (except in episode 18, which Kennosuke narrates instead) about the featured mecha that appear in this series, including geoframes, artifacts, vehicles and infrastructures. General facts about each mecha are also presented for use of terminology.

No.	Title	Original air date
1	"The Sky Raining Demons"; Transliteration: "Oni no Furu Sora" (Japanese: 鬼の降る空)	April 7, 2016
During a career counseling meeting, Yukina Shirahane learns that she is currently failing at Tateyama International High School, although determined to visit Mars someday. After school, Yukina and Mika Ogino go to the United Nations Kurobe Laboratory, a research facility where their parents work. Meanwhile, the Ministry of Defense detects a meteorite heading for Japan that divides between Toyama and Nagano as it enters the atmosphere. Minoru Aramata shows Yukina a large black cube and a gigantic geoframe found while excavating for the Kurobe Dam sixty years ago. Suddenly, one of the meteorite fragments crashes near the United Nations Kurobe Laboratory. A huge rose-colored geoframe called the Headless and small geoframes called Cactuses appear. The research facility dispatches shield-like geoframes called Dwarves to battle the Cactuses, while director Hiromi Shirahane authorizes pilot Tom Borden and navigator Liu Shenmei in the GAUS 1 to fight the Headless. Yukina opens the Cube after touching a glowing red panel, revealing Kennosuke Tokisada Ouma, a naked man who kneels and calls her princess. He relentlessly defeats one of the Cactuses that enters the building, while Tom and Shenmei manage to defeat the Headless outside. Kennosuke is then subdued by six security guards. Yukina says that the GAUS stands for Gravity Attenuated Upright Shell and it was built at the United Nations Kurobe Laboratory. The GAUS is 19.4 meters tall. It is a two-seater unit operated by a pilot and a navigator, and it is equipped with a gatling gun and a revolver knife.
2	"The Black Relic Awakened"; Transliteration: "Kuroki Mukuro wa Mezameta" (Japanese: 黒き骸は目覚めた)	April 14, 2016
In the past, Princess Yukihime inquires about people who live in foreign lands beyond the sea. In the present, a huge geoframe called the Yellow Crab lands on the coast and heads towards the shore accompanied by many Cactuses. Major Arthur Graham detects the landing of more hostile geoframes in other countries worldwide. Hiromi goes with Dr. Jules Hausen to interrogate Kennosuke, but Kennosuke manages to escape and take Yukina, who he soon realizes is not the princess. He calls upon the Cube, which transports them to the underground storage keeping the gigantic geoframe called the Black Relic. The Cube docks with the Black Relic, which Kennosuke activates as the pilot and uses to smash out of the facility with Yukina onboard as the navigator. The defense forces attack the Yellow Crab with little effect, while Hiromi orders the defense forces not to attack the Black Relic. Kennosuke and Yukina attack the Yellow Crab, but they become surrounded by four sword-wielding Headless. After Kennosuke and Yukina defeat the Headless, they prepare to destroy the Yellow Crab, but a tractor beam in the sky takes it up to an alien mothership instead. Yukina says that nothing is known about the Black Relic, other than Kennosuke naming it "Kuromukuro". The Black Relic is 19.5 meters tall (21.9 meters tall including the horns). It is a humanoid relic found during dam construction work sixty years ago. Along with the three meter Cube, it is an artifact currently being researched at the United Nations Kurobe Laboratory.
3	"The Castle Ruins Cannot Turn Back Time"; Transliteration: "Jōseki ni Toki wa Kaerazu" (Japanese: 城跡に時は還らず)	April 21, 2016
Sixty years ago, the Cube and the Black Relic were discovered near the Kurobe Dam, where the United Nations built a large research facility to study them. In the present, Graham and Rita Ferreira Mendes confirm that the Cactuses are unmanned. Kennosuke and Yukina travel outside the currently uninhabited Toyama Castle, but Kennosuke fails to adjust to modern fashion and technology. Despite the Black Relic immobilized and Kennosuke being captured by the United Nations forces, he escapes custody again until Sophie Noël tackles him before two security guards activate a shock collar around his neck. Oshō Yakushi talks to Kennosuke, learning that he was just a soldier assigned to fight against the mythical invaders called Ogres. Kennosuke later uses a diversion by Koharu Shirahane to escape yet again and take her to the mountains. However, a Cactus appears and abducts Koharu. Kennosuke returns to the research facility and calls upon the Cube, taking Yukina onboard as they pursue. Although Kennosuke's sword breaks during the battle, Tom and Shenmei fortunately arrive to destroy the Cactus and rescue Koharu. Kennosuke finally accepts that he is now in the future upon seeing a cliff split in half during a battle in the past. Yukina says that the Cactus is a thorny-looking enemy, randomly named by the United Nations. The Cactus is 3.8 meters tall. It is an unmanned geoframe that the enemy deploys en masse. It boasts of high-frequency blades in its arms for weapons but it has no inherent gravity or ineria control mechanism. It appears all over the place and seems to be abducting humans.
4	"The Foreign Taste Tells All"; Transliteration: "Ikoku no Aji ni Ono ga Kyōgū o Shiru" (Japanese: 異国の味に己が境遇を知る)	April 28, 2016
Kennosuke has dinner with Yukina, Koharu and Yakushi, trying modern rice and curry for the first time. The Ministry of Defense analyzes that six giant geoframes have landed across the world, but only Japan was able to defeat one. The geoframes appear to be searching for something rather than attacking. Kennosuke watches a historical movie about the Battle of Okehazama on television, then chases Yukina's pet ferret Kojo riding on a robotic vacuum cleaner. After taking a bath, he struggles to put on boxer shorts, so he ties on Yukina's favorite towel under his robe instead. Later, Yukina takes Kennosuke to the Tateyama Mall, where he marvels at the strange new world. They encounter two reporters who remember that Yukina's father Takehito Shirahane advocated a bizarre theory before his disappearance about the legend of Ogres in association with aliens. After evading the reporters and returning home, Yukina shows Kennosuke a notebook written by Takehito about the Ogres, including a passage on the extermination of the Washiba Clan by a mysterious unknown power. The notebook also contains a candid blurred image that Kennosuke recognizes as the Ogre that attack him and Yukihime 450 years ago. Yukina says that the Dwarves guard the gates of the United Nations Kurobe Laboratory and they can stand upright without a gravity mechanism. The Dwarf is 3.7 meters tall. It is an all-purpose single-seater developed in the USA, and its official model number is MM3A. While it was created following the progress in robotic science due to analyzing the artifacts, it is not equipped with a gravity control system. The security models can be equipped with either .50 caliber machine guns or anti-tank missiles.
5	"The Man Who Came to the Garden of Learning"; Transliteration: "Manabiya ni Kita Otoko" (Japanese: 学び舎に来た男)	May 5, 2016
Yukina goes to school, only to be horrified when Kennosuke has been enrolled as a student. Forty hours ago, Kennosuke and Yukina were stationed by the United Nations Kurobe Laboratory, where they are the only ones who can operate the Black Relic since it implanted them with nano-machine channels. Kennosuke painted a rough sketch of an Ogre that the United Nations can use for identification. Graham introduced Kennosuke and Yukina to Tom, Shenmei, Sophie and Toshiyuki "Sebastian" Mozumi, otherwise known as the GAUS crew. In the present, Kennosuke struggles with modern school life. After school nurse and student counselor Marina Unami directs Kennosuke to the library, he learns that the era of the samurai has long passed. Sophie then questions Kennosuke and Yukina for their reason for fighting, but she leaves in disappointment when Kennosuke desires revenge and Yukina has uncertainty. While Paula Kowalczyk and Girolamo "Giro" Casiraghi transport the Black Relic to Tateyama, North American Aerospace Defense Command (NORAD) detects another object launched from the alien mothership heading for Toyama. As three hostile geoframes land near the town, the GAUS crew prepare to be mobilized while Kennosuke and Yukina reach the Black Relic in the impending battle. Yukina says that the Headless got its name because it does not have a head, in which the United Nations lacks creativity for naming. The Headless is 19.6 meters tall. It is an unmanned large geoframe that the invaders deploy. It is capable of gravity and inertia control and thus nullifies most ranged attacks, but it has been confirmed that it can be destroyed by using a kinetic energy saturation attack to overload its gravity shield.
6	"Dancing on the Bank of the River Jinzu"; Transliteration: "Jinzū no Kawara ni Mau" (Japanese: 神通の川原に舞う)	May 12, 2016
While inside the Black Relic at the Toyama Kitokito Airport, Kennosuke and Yukina duel against the Yellow Crab, but the two Headlesses attack the Black Relic from behind. Meanwhile, Jundai Kayahara and Ryoto Akagi leave the school to approach the battle site as the citizens are evacuating. The GAUS crew deploy their units and arrive to engage the Headlesses, managing to destroy them. Kennosuke and Yukina struggle to defeat the Yellow Crab due to its high-output gravity shield, but they finally manage to destroy it. During the battle, Jundai and Ryoto commence live streaming from a mobile phone which is viewed worldwide. A pilot encased in armor emerges from the wreckage of the Yellow Crab and removes his helmet, surprisingly having a human appearance. He announces himself as Hedo, a border reform officer for the extraterrestrial organization Efi Dorg. Then, Hedo asks Kennosuke, wielder of the large humanoid geoframe Grongol, why he betrayed Efi Dorg. Lastly, Hedo detonates the Yellow Crab with him inside, causing a devastating explosion. Yukina says that the Yellow Crab shows up again, then questions if it looks like a crab and finally recommends the red snow crab if you are in Toyama. The Yellow Crab is 19.6 meters tall. It is one of the six large geoframes that landed across the globe. This one landed in Toyama City, Japan. Thought to be a command unit in the invaders' army, it boasts a unique form and an extremely high-output gravity shield. The first confirmed manned unit. As such, it can perform nuanced and, unlike the Headless, strategic maneuvers. Its weapons include two high-frequency blades and a flexible blade mounted on its back.
7	"The Daybreak Disappearance"; Transliteration: "Shinonome ni Kiyu" (Japanese: 東雲に消ゆ)	May 19, 2016
Following Hedo's suicidal death in the Yellow Crab, the United Nations Kurobe Laboratory assesses that the geoframes that landed in various parts of the world are confirmed to be related to the Black Relic of 450 years ago. Kennosuke mentions that the Black Relic was stolen by Yukihime, and he still seeks revenge for the destruction of the Washiba Clan. However, Yukina refuses to be further involved in anymore violence. While on the way to school, Kennosuke and Yukina learn from José Carlos Takasuka that Jundai and Ryoto have gone missing. Sophie later presents Yukina with an ultimatum to either die fighting or die trying to escape the fight. Kennosuke has conflicted thoughts about Yukina riding behind him in the Black Relic, since he needs her to exact his revenge. Yukina realizes that Kennosuke has this selfish desire of revenge that would ultimately lead to his death. On the Efi Dorg Spaceship, the Gezon-Reco Company, people dressed in battle armor, discuss their strategy of gathering pieces of the legendary Pivot Stone. They send Earth a demanding message for the return of the Black Relic. After having an argument with Hiromi, Yukina leaves the house the next morning. Yukina says that the GAUS Transport Trailer carried the Black Relic down the Hokuriku Expressway, all the way to Shin-Tateyama Station. The GAUS Transport Trailer is a special trailer made to transport the GAUS over long distances. It has been used before to transport the GAUS's US-made torsos to the United Nations Kurobe Laboratory, but this is the first time it has ever transported a full-sized large geoframe. It has a maximum payload of 450 tons.
8	"The Black Eagle's Castle"; Transliteration: "Kurowashi no Shiro" (Japanese: 黒鷲の城)	May 26, 2016
Paula and Giro discover that the Black Relic can absorb nearby mass in order to repair itself. As Hiromi and Graham decide that it is best not to hand over the Black Relic to Efi Dorg, Hiromi receives a call from Koharu that Yukina is gone. It turns out that Yukina is secretly sulking at Mika's house. Kennosuke, Koharu and Yakushi eat some leftover gyōza, but Yukina later returns home and finds it empty, deciding to leave somewhere. Meanwhile, Jundai and Ryoto return to school unharmed, but they are scolded by Naoki Takekuma for live streaming the battle at the airport. Elizabeth "Beth" Butler informs Graham that a geoframe called the Longarm was discovered in North America and has returned to the Efi Dorg Spaceship with an unknown object. After returning home from school, Kennosuke overhears from Yakushi's phone call that Yukina went to Kurowashi Valley, and he goes after her on horseback. While Yukina is searching for the Washiba Clan's castle, she is attacked by a Cactus. A small blue geoframe called the Liddy stops and destroys the Cactus, while Yukina falls unconscious. With no reply from Earth, Efi Dorg officer Fusunani is dispatched to Earth's surface. Yukina says that the Cube acts as the cockpit for the Black Relic, in which Kennosuke refers to it as a horse when it is transformed. The Cube is one of the artifacts. Scientists have been trying to analyze it for the past sixty years, but it remains an even bigger mystery than the Black Relic. It is actually the cockpit for the Black Relic and a vehicle. It uses a unique identification system and does not function without the presence of both Kennosuke and Yukina.
9	"The Demon Laughs in the Cavern"; Transliteration: "Iwaya ni Oni ga Warau" (Japanese: 岩屋に鬼が嗤う)	June 2, 2016
The Longarm and four Headlesses advance towards the Kurobe Dam. The GAUS crew are on standby, while Hiromi continues to worry about Yukina. Meanwhile, Yukina awakes inside a secret base full of old appliances, chancing upon a bloodstained notebook written by Takehito about the destruction of the Washiba Clan. She faints after seeing the Liddy once again. Jundai and Ryoto later find Yukina at a bus stop shelter, but Kennosuke also arrives at the scene. Instead, Yukina agrees to ride with him in the Black Relic, as long as he does not go off and die. After being retrieved by the defense forces, Kennosuke and Yukina deploy in the Black Relic and attack the Longarm and the four Headlesses. However, they are surrounded and caught in a tractor beam that starts to pull them towards the Efi Dorg Spaceship. The defense forces fire missiles at the hostile geoframes, which enables the Black Relic to break free. The GAUS crew arrive and defeat the Headlesses, while Kennosuke and Yukina fight and defeat the Longarm. Fusunani emerges from the Longarm and surrenders. Yukina says that the Longarm fell in the United States of America in a place called Area 51, and it stole something from them before getting away. The Longarm is 27 meters tall. It is one of Efi Dorg's large geoframes that landed across the globe. This one landed in South Nevada, United States. Codenamed "Longarm" after its long arms. It seems to have taken something after destroying Area 51, but it's unclear what exactly. It's armed with one high-frequency sword and have six high-frequency short swords mounted on its legs.
10	"The Pompous Prisoner"; Transliteration: "Fuson'na Toriko" (Japanese: 不遜な虜)	June 9, 2016
Aramata, Paula and Giro examine Fusunani's sword, while Hiromi and Hausen scan Fusunani's body, finding out that both are similar to those of Kennosuke. Fusunani tells Carrie Dunham and Heath Kingsley, specialists from the extraterrestrial research division, that he is a border reform officer affiliated with Efi Dorg's Gezon-Reco Company. After Takekuma crushes Ryoto's dreams of being a potential GAUS pilot someday, Ryoto goes to the arcade to score high on a first-person shooter. When he leaves, Jundai and Carlos witness Sophie scoring extremely higher. Fusunani says that the aim of the Gezon-Reco Company is to bring prosperity to savage planets. The objects they seek are fragments of the Pivot Stone that was broken when an advance team was wiped out 450 years ago by the Black Relic, whose wielder seemingly betrayed them. Dunham and Kingsley question Kennosuke about what happened 450 years ago, but he mentions that the Ogres destroyed the Washiba Clan's castle and he then fought alongside Yukihime in the Black Relic before her inevitable death. He denies being part of the Efi Dorg's advance team, but Dunham and Kingsley remain suspicious. Meanwhile, Fusunani escapes from the security guards and remotely summons the Longarm. Yukina says that the Geo-Express connects Shin-Tateyama and the Kurobe Dam, in which it apparently took three hours to travel until the line was built. After the artifacts were found, it was considered necessary to have a means of transporting the Black Relic to a harbor where large ships could dock. Enter the Geo-Express. In the end, it was decided that the artifacts would be studied at the United Nations Kurobe Laboratory, but the route still boasts a large transport capacity. There are special freight cars that can transport the GAUS, and Shin-Tateyama Station is constructed in a way that allows the passage of large objects. In all, the route spans 21 kilometers.
11	"The Truth Shrouded in Darkness"; Transliteration: "Yami ni Fushitaru Makoto" (Japanese: 闇に臥したる真)	June 16, 2016
The Longarm makes its way towards the United Nations Kurobe Laboratory and pierces a main power line with its sword. The GAUS crew deploy and intercept the Longarm outside. Meanwhile, Fusunani kidnaps Yukina and follows her to the excavation site, where he recognizes a Pivot Stone fragment. After they head to the deployment bridge near the Black Relic, Kennosuke confronts Fusunani in battle. Kennosuke accuses Fusunani of being Sadakuro Saito of the Washiba Clan, but Fusunani accuses Kennosuke of being a traitor and having his memories altered. As Kennosuke stabs Fusunani in the chest, Fusunani falls to his death, which then causes the Longarm to collapse. Dunham and Kingsley cannot discern whether Kennosuke or Fusunani was telling the truth of their past. After Ryoto realized that he was beaten by Sophie in the arcade, he fails to overtake her score after numerous efforts. In order to prevent Kennosuke from sitting like a statue all day, Yukina invites him to hike with her to the secret base where she saw her father's notebook, but all they find is a giant crater. While eating onigiri together, Kennosuke reaffirms his promise to always protect Yukina. Yukina says that the Black Relic is stored in a hangar, which was built to conduct experiments and quite an ordeal when needed to deploy. The Black Relic Hangar is a large hangar built to enable precise analysis of the Black Relic. Since launching the unit was not on anyone's mind while building it, its handles were fixed in place, but since Efi Dorg's initial assault, they were switched out for movable ones that allow the Black Relic to launch.
12	"A Glimpse of Hell in the Kurobe Summer"; Transliteration: "Kurobe no Natsu ni Jjigoku o Miru" (Japanese: 黒部の夏に地獄を見る)	June 23, 2016
On the Efi Dorg Spaceship, the Gezon-Reco Company retrieves another Pivot Stone fragment from Earth, but they are frustrated at their slow progress of collecting all the fragments, plus they have yet to locate the important Key Stone. At the end of class, Mika notices that Kennosuke is doing better at English literature than Yukina. During a summer training camp, the GAUS crew put Kennosuke, Yukina and Ryoto through a series of rigorous physical training. However, Yukina and Ryoto struggle to keep up the pace, and Ryoto himself is forced to withdraw after injuring his leg. After Kennosuke and Yukina undergo intense educational studies in the classroom, they train in the shooting range, though Kennosuke uses a sword as a substitute. They even simulate mountain hiking while in a swimming pool, but a shocking accident leaves Kennosuke and Yukina to take a break. In the meantime, the United Nations Kurobe Laboratory experiments with gravity control for Tom and Shenmei in the GAUS 1 to walk on water with limited success. By the end of summer training camp, Yukina eventually improves her fitness. Kennosuke is given back his sword and is unshackled from his shock collar. Yukina says that the Mass Driver is used to launch the GAUS units and the Black Relic, in which you cannot help but scream when you are sent flying. The Mass Driver is a graviton-controlling launch pad. It is an experimental device constructed to launch heavy objects using graviton control. The barrel is equipped with devices that generate gravitational fields, and it launches objects by dragging them towards the muzzle. To those in the object, it feels like they are dropping towards the exit.
13	"Beckoned by the Festival Music"; Transliteration: "Matsuribayashi ni Yobarete" (Japanese: 祭囃子に呼ばれて)	June 30, 2016
The Black Relic and the two GAUS units fight to drive a geoframe called the Spider controlled by Efi Dorg officer Mirasa from the urban area. The Spider is stabbed during battle, being forced to retreat and recover. Yukina's class plans for the school's cultural festival and decides on the theme "Teach me about Efi Dorg" since there are three geoframe pilots in the class. The other students build a large replica of the Black Relic through the night, while Kennosuke and Yukina bring food for them on the Cube, which is airlifted back to the research facility by a helicopter of the defense forces. On the day of the cultural festival, Mika encourages Kennosuke and Yukina to try out cosplay, but the two go on to enjoy the various exhibits instead. Efi Dorg officer Muetta attends the cultural festival cosplay competition in her battle armor, which is mistaken for a costume. While a forum for Kennosuke, Yukina and Sophie as geoframe pilots is in progress, Muetta suddenly appears on stage and stabs Kennosuke in the chest with her sword. Kennosuke is stunned to see that Muetta's face looks just like Yukihime. Yukina says that the Spider has tons of legs, which is all that needs to be explained. The Spider is 23 meters tall. It is one of the large-scale Efi Dorg geoframes that descended around the world. Efi Dorg calls its large-scale geoframes "Grongols". In France, it landed in Strasbourg and entered Germany through the Rhine River. The Spider has four legs, but tucks the other two legs into its backs when walking upright. Its codename "Spider" comes from its ability to perform intricate maneuvers on all four legs. It is armed with one oscillating long blade and another oscillating short blade mounted on its left side. Each of its four legs contains hidden blades.
14	"Rasetsu Dance Festival"; Transliteration: "Matsuri ni Odoru Rasetsu" (Japanese: 祭に踊る羅刹)	July 1, 2016
Before Muetta can kill the badly wounded Kennosuke, she is stopped by a masked and cloaked Demon. In the meantime, Takekuma treats the wounds of Kennosuke. Muetta evades the attack by the Demon and calls for her geoframe called the Medusa, which launches from the Efi Dorg Spaceship. Once inside the Medusa, she is immediately attacked by the GAUS crew in their units, but she manages to escape. Back at the United Nations Kurobe Laboratory, Graham briefs Kennosuke and Yukina on the current situation. Kennosuke recovers enough to pilot the Black Relic, with Yukina reluctantly behind as the navigator. Kennosuke and Yukina confront Muetta in the Medusa, who Kennosuke still believes is Yukihime. Then, Mirasa in the Spider arrives to join the fight, but seems to be uncoordinated with Muetta. However, the GAUS crew arrive as well and engage in battle against Mirasa. The Black Relic and the GAUS units fight as a team and damage the Spider, prompting Muetta and Mirasa to retreat back to the Efi Dorg Spaceship. Yukina says that the Medusa got its name because its swords look like hair. The Medusa is 20 meters tall. It is one of Efi Dorg's "Grongols" that descended around the world. In Azerbaijan, it landed in the suburbs of Baku. Its codename "Medusa" comes from the four blades mounted on its head, which move about freely like snakes. It is armed with two oscillating blades, one inside each arm, and eight expanding blades mounted on its head and waist.
15	"The End of Oiwake"; Transliteration: "Oiwake no Hate" (Japanese: 追分の果て)	July 8, 2016
Kennosuke is taken back to the United Nations Kurobe Laboratory for medical treatment following the battle against Muetta and Mirasa. Sophie and Sebastian realize that the residents are evacuating the area due to the recent geoframe attacks. Carlos has to face moving from Tateyama to Madrid. At school, the students show concern to Yukina about Kennosuke's condition. Meanwhile, Kennosuke has a past vision of Yukihime and the Demon conferring about him when he survived. Hausen is impressed to see that Kennosuke has recovered from his near fatal wounds through tissue regeneration. Mika invites Jundai, Carlos and Ryoto to film a cosplay fan video for her. Graham informs the GAUS crew that he will prepare single-seater GAUS units, meaning that Shenmei and Sebastian are no longer navigators. Sophie received a call from her father and will be returning to France. After Sophie pays for Kennosuke's meal, Kennosuke convinces her to go against her father's wishes of returning to France. On the Efi Dorg Spaceship, the Gezon-Reco Company debate their next course of action, but Muetta and Mirasa seek to redeem themselves and secretly dispatch to Earth. Yukina says that the GAUS 2, which is piloted by Sophie and navigated by Sebastian, is being modified to be manned solo. The GAUS 2 (New Model) is an adaptation of the experimental GAUS geoframe from a two-seat to a single-seat model. Increased usage of the geoframe in actual battles called for the original geoframe to be specialized for combat. This included the elimination of experimental parts, simplification of mechanical structures and upgrade of fire control systems. On a test basis, the single-seat model has been equipped with AI (Artificial Intelligence) which has been developed to support the pilot.
16	"The Flowing Water Reunion"; Transliteration: "Saikai wa Mizu ni Nagarete" (Japanese: 再会は水に流れて)	July 22, 2016
Muetta and Mirasa arrive at Kurobe Dam using atmospheric entry suits. Yukina, Mika, Jundai, Carlos and Ryoto travel to search for a location to film Mika's cosplay fan video. Mika has also invited Marina along to lift her spirits after she tenders her resignation due to Muetta's attack at the school's cultural festival. Graham begins trial simulations on single-seater GAUS units to increase their capacity to deal with enemy geoframes, with mixed success for each member of the GAUS crew. With Sophie departing for France soon, Kennosuke has a conversation with her about freedom and loyalty. Muetta and Mirasa gain entry inside the United Nations Kurobe Laboratory and disguise themselves as miners. They capture Kennosuke, who still believes that Muetta is Yukihime, but Muetta denies knowing him. They find the excavation site with the final fragments of the Pivot Stone. Confronted by the defense forces, Kennosuke tries to defend Muetta. However, Sophie says that he is foolish, and she vows to stay at the research facility. As they are about to leave, Mirasa stabs Muetta so that she can take sole credit for the discovery. Muetta jumps from the dam wall into the rushing waters below. Yukina says that the atmospheric entry suits are special suits worn by Efi Dorg to enter the planet, which is pretty gutsy of them. The atmospheric entry suits are spacesuits worn by invading Efi Dorg agents, made of special polymers with nano-machines woven into the fabric. A simple gravity control device enables the agents to walk on water.
17	"Oni Dancing in the Clouds"; Transliteration: "Unchū ni Oni ga Mau" (Japanese: 雲中に鬼が舞う)	July 28, 2016
The Gezon-Reco Company notices that Efi Dorg officer Imusa has descended again to Earth in order to find the three remaining Pivot Stones including the Key Stone. After viewing footage of Mirasa stabbing Muetta at the Kurobe Dam, Kennosuke storms out and Yukina follows him. Hiromi waits for replacement parts to arrive for the GAUS units. Kennosuke, Yukina and the GAUS crew debate whether or not Muetta is really Yukihime. Afterwards, Kennosuke and Yukina deploy the Black Relic to search for Muetta in the river. However, Efi Dorg officer Yoruba arrives in a flying geoframe called the Bluebird to check on his comrades, also shooting down a cargo aircraft carrying the replacement parts. The cargo aircraft crew manage to offload the replacement parts before crash-landing, where Kennosuke and Yukina saves the crew from crashing into the research facility. Yoruba finds Mirasa, who lies that Muetta has already died, but he goes to find Muetta. He attacks the Black Relic in the air, but the Demon attaches a winged geoframe called the Crow to the Black Relic to help Kennosuke and Yukina. Because of Kennosuke's mistrust of Ogres, the Demon departs but promises to assist him if needed. Yukina says that the Bluebird flies at an incredible speed, while the pilot who saves them had a familiar voice. The Bluebird is 35 meters tall and 84 meters wide. It is one of Efi Dorg's "Grongols" that descended around the world. In French Guiana, it landed in Cayenne. It is the only Grongol that has the ability to fly. Its original codename "L'oiseau Bleu" was permanently changed to "Bluebird" as it traversed English-speaking countries. It is armed with an oscillating lance in its body, and an unusual, high-density needle which allows it to fly.
18	"Yukemuri Disappears"; Transliteration: "Yukemuri Ni Kieru" (Japanese: 湯煙に消える)	August 4, 2016
After Hiromi tells Kennosuke and Yukina that the defense forces are searching for Muetta, Hiromi gives Kennosuke and Yukina a three-month salary. While Kennosuke pays for dinner at home, Yukina later invites Mika, who then invites all their classmates, to Toyama Memorial cottage in order to visit "Kenshin's hidden hot springs" for the weekend. However, only the core group of Yukina's friends and family end up going. After everyone enjoys a meal cooked by Kennosuke, they then criticize the cosplay fan video edited by Carlos, which blasts heavy metal filmed in a black and white format. They come up with better ideas for a new film with sports, drama, romance, horror and ghost adventures as the theme. The next day, the wounded Muetta takes refuge at the hot spring, hoping to aid her recovery. After getting lost, Kennosuke and Yukina arrive at the same hot spring. They stumble upon Muetta, and the defense forces take her into custody. Just then, a Cactus appears, captures Yukina and escapes back into orbit. Kennosuke, who is narrating in Yukina's absence, says that the Pivot Stone is what the enemy is after. The Pivot Stone is a new artifact discovered deep inside the United Nations Kurobe Laboratory. Efi Dorg invaded Earth to retrieve the artifact. Interrogation of a captive confirmed that the Pivot Stone was issued 450 years ago, but its function is unknown. It is incredibly dense with a single fragment weighing over 500 tons.
19	"Invitation to a Demon's Feast"; Transliteration: "Oni Ga Izanau Utage" (Japanese: 鬼が誘う宴)	August 11, 2016
The Cactus returns to the Efi Dorg Spaceship carrying Yukina in a bio-conveyance capsule, and the Gezon-Reco Company believe that Yukina is Muetta. At the United Nations Kurobe Laboratory, Hausen concludes that Yukina and Muetta share the same mitochondrial DNA, and Yukina was therefore abducted by mistake. Graham relieves Sophie of her duties. Later on, Sophie sees some writing appear on the ground outside the research facility, asking if she wants to learn the truth about Ogres. Hausen informs Hiromi that only Kennosuke's blood sample will be able to heal Muetta. When Sophie returns to her house, the Demon is waiting for her and introduces himself as Zelleager "Zell" Myundef Vishrai. As he explains that he is neither an Ogre nor an Earthling, he confirms that he is an enemy of Efi Dorg. Kennosuke begs Muetta to navigate the Black Relic to the Efi Dorg Spaceship with him as the pilot, to which she agrees but cannot guarantee his return. As they prepare to leave in the Black Relic, they see a recorded message from Yukihime imploring her ancestors to fight the Ogres and protect the Washiba Clan. Muetta then wonders more about her unknown past. Yukina says that the bio-conveyance capsule looked like a rubber package that carried her into outer space, which she later used as clothing in a pinch. The bio-conveyance capsule is the sac-like capsule used by Efi Dorg that paralyzes its host and wraps its entire body with a belt-like material, isolating it from the outside. When completely sealed, an internal nano-machine is activated to maintain the host in a state of suspended animation. It is used by Efi Dorg when Cactus geoframes abduct humans from Earth.
20	"The Tiger's Maw Leaping into the Fire"; Transliteration: "Tonde Hi ni Iru Tora no Kuchi" (Japanese: 飛んで火に入る虎の口)	August 18, 2016
After escaping captivity, Yukina realizes that she is inside the Efi Dorg Spaceship, but she encounters Mirasa, who believes that Yukina is Muetta. After evading Mirasa, Yukina manages to access Efi Dorg's virtual database and learns about their plans of assembling the Pivot Stone. Yukina is further shocked to discover a head that resembles Yukihime. Meanwhile, Kennosuke and Muetta leave the research facility in the Black Relic, while Graham confines Hiromi for security lapse. At Sophie's house, Zell reveals to Sophie that Efi Dorg aims for planet domination, and he wants to avenge his compatriots slaughtered on his conquered planet. Before Sebastian charges inside, Zell leaves Sophie with a flash drive. Muetta requests retrieval to the Efi Dorg Spaceship and reports to the Grezon-Reco Company, learning that they planted seeds of life on various planets. When Kennosuke is detected onboard, Muetta is accused of being a traitor. Kennosuke and Muetta reunite with Yukina, leaving the Efi Dorg Spaceship in their geoframes, but are pulled away from orbit. Zell in the Crow intercepts and safely carries the Black Relic and the Medusa to Earth. The research facility receives a message that the Efi Dorg Spaceship is descending towards the planet's surface. Yukina says that the Crow is a winged mech that saved her once again, and it does not seem to be her enemy. The Crow is a mysterious flying geoframe thought to have the same capabilities as the Black Relic, as they look strikingly similar from the outside. Like the Bluebird, the Crow has gigantic wings and is thought to be equipped with a gravity propulsion mechanism because of the powerful gravitational waves it emits during flight. Its codename "Crow" comes from its ability to fly and its black exterior.
21	"The Day the Stronghold Fell"; Transliteration: "Gajō no Ochiru hi" (Japanese: 牙城の落ちる日)	August 25, 2016
The Black Relic and the Medusa return to Earth assisted by Zell, but Muetta is consequently arrested. Zell states that Yukihime died 450 years ago and Muetta is a replica based on her genetic information. He further explains that Efi Dorg creates clones of the lifeforms that they conquer and embeds false memories in them to be loyal vanguards. He also tells Yukina that her father Takehito was a close friend. While citizens are evacuating, the Efi Dorg Spaceship launches multiple geoframes, including the Rockhead, the Bluebird and the Spider. Zell attaches the Crow to the Black Relic so Kennosuke and Yukina can confront Yoruba. Tom, Shenmei and Sebastian engage Imusa, Mirasa and the Headlesses on the ground using single-seater GAUS units. As the battle grows fierce and the research facility soon breached by the Headlesses, the Efi Dorg Spaceship drops many Cactuses, which release electronic parasites that take control of some of the staff. Sophie gets her friends to rescue Muetta from an overturned van, while Sebastian sacrifices himself in an attempt to destroy the Spider. Kennosuke and Yukina in the Black Relic pick up Tom in his GAUS 1, and they depart from the overrun research facility. Yukina says that the GAUS 3 fought its first battle, and Shenmei was able to survive due to an escape pod. The GAUS 3 is a GAUS geoframe reconfigured for purely military purposes, designed and constructed by the Los Alamos National Research Center. Its basic components are similar to GAUS 1, but the new version's vital parts are protected by an armored shell and it is equipped with an escape hatch. Responsiveness of inertia controls has been improved to minimize the lag time between GAUS 3 and pilot commands. Since humans cannot manufacture gravity control systems themselves, they must wait for the division and development of parts from the original "Gravity Attenuated Upright Shell" that was excavated at Kurobe Dam.
22	"A Demon Crying in the Snow"; Transliteration: "Oni ga naita setchūka" (Japanese: 鬼が哭いた雪中花)	September 1, 2016
Kennosuke, Yukina, as well as the close-knit students and the remaining staff who evacuated from the research facility, retreat to the high school, which has become the new base of operations. The entire region is completely isolated from the rest of the world because of the barrier created by Efi Dorg. When Kennosuke, Yukina and Muetta stop by Yakushi's home to visit Hiromi and Koharu, Zell appears and explains how he met and befriended Takehito many years ago, shortly before Takehito died from a sudden avalanche. Meanwhile, Efi Dorg manages to excavate the Pivot Stone from Kurobe Dam's underground excavation site, using the mind-controlled staff as slaves. The Pivot Stone draws in surrounding heat, icing the area and provoking a snowstorm over Kurobe Dam. Muetta, having finally accepted the fact that she is a replica with false memories, escapes from the base of operations. Yukina collapses in the snow while searching for Muetta. However, Muetta finds Yukina, taking refuge in a cabin. Before Kennosuke reaches them, Muetta reveals that Efi Dorg plans to use the Pivot Stone to create a wormhole between Earth and its homeland, enabling a correctional fleet to storm the planet and subjugate it. Yukina says that the Rockhead is a spiky, red-colored guy that moves really fast and gives punches that would really hurt. The Rockhead is 23.8 meters tall and 14.8 meters wide. It is one of Efi Dorg's "Grongols" that descended around the world. In Russia, it landed in the New Siberian Islands. Following a tactical nuclear attack, the Headless was destroyed, but the Rockhead did not appear to suffer any external damage. However, it may have suffered internal damage as it stopped moving and was retrieved by the Efi Dorg Spaceship. It is armed with twin rotating and oscillating stakes in its forearms, and specially equipped with the ability to compress water particles in the air and create a blast of vapor which expands and accelerates using a laser propulsion mechanism.
23	"Frogs Singing in the Snow"; Transliteration: "Yuki ni Utau Kaeru" (Japanese: 雪に唄う蛙)	September 8, 2016
In the classroom, Jundai, Carlos and Ryoto argue over the fate of the world. In the base of operations, Zell and the research facility staff consider their limited options concerning the Pivot Stone while the barrier is intact. As Kennosuke, Yukina and Muetta joins the classroom, Sophie and Mika greet Muetta, who then explains about the correctional fleet soon storming through a wormhole. Takekuma enters the classroom and tells a story about two frogs jumping into a fresh pot of milk, one who drowned in it and one who churned it into butter to jump out. Later on, Takekuma has a career counseling meeting with Kennosuke, giving him insight on his future plans. After Muetta tastes modern cuisine for the first time, she receives advice from Marina about exploring her own identity. Carlos writes a movie script suggested during their hot springs adventure, titled "Demon Hell Brigade (Sturm und Drang)". Filming commences in the baseball field after the other students agree to participate in it. During the filming, Kennosuke asks Muetta to fight with him as an equal against Efi Dorg. Meanwhile, the Grezon-Reco Company extracts the completed Pivot Stone and ascends it above the Efi Dorg Spaceship. Yukina says that the Efi Dorg Spaceship is where the border reform officers live, is pretty big and is filled with strange machines. The Efi Dorg Spaceship is 1,140 meters tall and 1,000 meters wide. It is Efi Dorg's standard amphibious spaceship loaded with 90 spacecraft including the commander craft. Anti-gravity propulsion enables travel at near-speed of light. First thought to be a meteorite, the Efi Dorg Spaceship was quickly pulled into the Earth's orbit when it decelerated and changed course. When the ISS was destroyed, the U.S. considered intercepting it with an ICBM, but decided against it for fear of provoking other nuclear powers around the world.
24	"The Bloody Battle of Kurobe Dam"; Transliteration: "Kessen no Kurobe Damu" (Japanese: 血戦の黒部ダム)	September 15, 2016
Muetta decides to fight alongside the humans. While Graham asks Sophie to pilot the GAUS 1, Kennosuke and Yukina promise to protect each other. The Black Relic, the Medusa, the GAUS 1 and the Crow engage the Bluebird and the Spider. Meanwhile, Graham and Hiromi lead a small group of troops to recapture the United Nation Kurobe Laboratory from the Cactuses, managing to find the unconscious mind-controlled staff and reboot the control room. Sophie reunites with Sebastian, revealed to still be alive as he takes control of the GAUS 2. Kennosuke and Yukina defeat Yoruba, while Muetta defeats Mirasa. Lefil, leader of the Grezon-Reco Company, then descends and unites his geoframe with Imusa's Rockhead to create the giant geoframe called the Ogre. However, it is defeated executing Yukina's plan of using simultaneous attacks. Lefil returns to the Efi Dorg Spaceship, but ends up mortally wounded by Zell and revealed to be a clone from Zell's race. Zell uses a parasite to get Lefil to shut down the wormhole. The wounded Lefil reveals to Zell, Kennosuke, Muetta and Hiromi that Efi Dorg will send a larger correctional fleet that would reach Earth in 224 rotational periods. Yukina says that the Ogre is a big one that the enemy boss was on, which was awesome to see when giant robots combine. The Ogre is 48 meters tall and 170 meters wide. It is the first Efi Dorg Gezon-Reco Unit commander craft to be sighted at Kurobe Dam, Japan. It can fly independently and transform from flight mode to combat mode. It can also fuse with a Grongol to share enhanced power, firearm control and scouting capabilities. It has no exterior weapons, but its arms turn into four oscillating flexible blades whose ends can grab objects, like hands.
25	"The Dream the Demons Had"; Transliteration: "Oni no Mita Yume" (Japanese: 鬼の見た夢clone)	September 22, 2016
Lefil says that Efi Dorg controls 85 percent of Zell's planet, which gives Zell hope that there may be a resistance movement. The Efi Dorg invasion force also had received communication that some planets subjugated by them are uniting. Muetta, confirmed to be an artificial creation, learns that all border reform officers are disposed of once their job is done. Graham fears that an arms race may start after the failed invasion, while Hausen and Dunham also fear that the immortal Efi Dorg clones like Kennosuke and Muetta may pose a threat to humanity. Zell tells Kennosuke, Yukina and Muetta about when he came to Earth with others of his race to find allies and fight Efi Dorg, but only found Kennosuke and Yukihime alive. The two were trained to control the captured Black Relic and defeated Efi Dorg, but only Kennosuke and Zell survived the battle. In the new climate of suspicion, Hausen has Muetta fitted with a shock collar and Kennosuke is treated as a threat. Kennosuke resolves to travel to Zell's planet with Zell and Muetta to fight Efi Dorg. After spending time in an amusement park, Kennosuke breaks off his engagement with Yukina, leaving her heartbroken. Yukina says that the Liddy has been living with Zell for a long time, and has been the only companion before Takehito came along. The Liddy is a Cactus (small-scale unmanned geoframes) sent to Earth by Efi Dorg 450 years ago. It was damaged and abandoned, but recovered, repaired and fine-tuned by Zell. Investigation of the Efi Dorg Spaceship confirmed that the red geoframes were for combat, yellow for maintenance and blue for reconnaissance support. It is not equipped with speech, but according to Zell, "you can understand what it is trying to say once you get used to it."
26	"The Samurai Who Doesn't Look Back"; Transliteration: "Samurai wa Furikaerazu" (Japanese: 侍は振り返らず)	September 29, 2016
Kennosuke entrusts Ryoto with Yukina before leaving. As Yukina tells her classmastes that Kennosuke plans to help Zell and Muetta liberate Zell's planet from Efi Dorg, her classmates join her in her mission to follow Kennosuke. Outside the research facility, Mika and Carlos enlist the help of reporters as a distraction for Graham. With both the Medusa and the Black Relic locked inside the research facility, Sebastian guides Yukina, Sophie and Jundai to the Medusa. Yukina and Jundai then uses the Medusa to retrieve the Black Relic for Kennosuke, Muetta and Zell. In the Efi Dorg Spaceship, Zell activates the Pivot Stone and opens the Efi Dorg portal. While in the Ogre, Tom unsuccessfully tries to stop Kennosuke, Muetta and Zell before they depart in the portal. However, Yukina is unable to reach the portal and is left behind. The finished film is seen by some of those who participated in it. Five years later, the Toyama Kitokito Spaceport is open. Yukina, Sophie and Sebastian board a spaceship with a strike force and depart for binary star system Chi-one Sagittarii to assist Kennosuke and Zell in the fight against Efi Dorg.

=== Light novel ===
In 2018, a light novel sequel to the series titled Kuromukuro: A Ghost at a Speed of 290,000 Kilometers per Second (クロムクロ 秒速29万kmの亡霊, Kuromukuro: Byōsoku 29-man km no Bōrei) was digitally released by the publisher P.A. Books on their website. The novel picks up after the ending of the TV series and features the journey of Yukina and Sophie on board the Kurobe spaceship in search of Kennosuke. The author of the series is Ryo Higaki (one of the key writers on the TV series) and the illustrator is Yuriko Ishii (character designer for the TV series). The novel was serialized monthly from June 2018 to its conclusion in the seventh volume in November 2018.
