= Eta Sagittarii =

Star in the constellation Sagittarius

η Sagittarii
- Location of η Sagittarii (circled)

Observation data Epoch J2000 Equinox ICRS
- Constellation: Sagittarius
- Right ascension: 18^{h} 17^{m} 37.63505^{s}
- Declination: −36° 45′ 42.0667″
- Apparent magnitude (V): +3.11/+7.8

Characteristics
- Spectral type: M2 III + G8:IV:
- U−B color index: +1.71
- B−V color index: +1.56
- Variable type: Lb

Astrometry
Radial velocity (R_{v})	+0.5 km/s
Proper motion (μ)	RA: −129.56 mas/yr Dec.: −166.26 mas/yr
Parallax (π)	22.35±0.24 mas
Distance	146 ± 2 ly (44.7 ± 0.5 pc)
Absolute magnitude (M_{V})	−4.90

Details

η Sgr A
Mass	2.1±0.7 M_{☉}
Radius	57.8 R_{☉}
Luminosity	525±6 L_{☉}
Surface gravity (log g)	1.13±0.05 cgs
Temperature	3,638±125 K

B
Temperature	5,143 K

Other designations
- Heryibwia, η Sgr, CD−36°12423, CPD−36°8128, FK5 683, GC 24944, HD 167618, HIP 89642, HR 6832, SAO 209957, PPM 297508, CCDM J18176-3646AB, WDS J18176-3646AB, β Tel, IDS 18109-3647 AB

Database references
SIMBAD	A
- B

Eta Sagittarii, also named Heryibwia /hɛriːɪbwiːɑː/, is a binary star system in the southern zodiac constellation of Sagittarius. Based upon parallax measurements, it is located at a distance of 146 light-years (45 parsecs) from Earth. In India, where part of the constellation of Sagittarius represents an Elephant, this star forms the creature's tail.

== Properties ==
The primary component, η Sagittarii A, is a red giant star with a stellar classification of M2 III. It is an evolved star that is currently at a stage called the asymptotic giant branch, having exhausted both the hydrogen and the helium at its core. This star is classified as an oxygen-rich irregular variable, as it undergoes small magnitude fluctuations between +3.08 and 3.12. The measured angular diameter of this star is 11.9±2.1 mas. At the estimated distance of Eta Sagittarii, this yields a physical size of about 57 times the radius of the Sun.

The companion, η Sagittarii B, was first noted by American astronomer S. W. Burnham in 1879. The two stars share a common proper motion and hence are probably gravitationally bound to each other. The secondary is likely an F-type main sequence star with an apparent magnitude of +7.77. It located at an angular separation of 3.6 arcseconds from the primary, along a position angle of 108°. This star is at a projected distance of 165 Astronomical Units from the red giant primary and the pair take a minimum of 1,270 years to complete an orbit.

Within the context of the Milky Way galaxy, this system is a member of the faint old disk group. Because of proper motion, this star will move into constellation Corona Australis around 6300 CE. Eta Sagittarii has two optical companions that are not physically associated with the system. The first is a 10th magnitude star at an angular separation of 93 arcseconds with a position angle of 303°. There is a fainter, 13th magnitude star at an angular separation of 33 arcseconds along a position angle of 276°.

== Name and etymology ==
Eta Sagittarii (Latinized from η Sagittarii, abbreviated Eta Sgr, η Sgr) is the star's Bayer designation.

Wia, the Boat, was an ancient Egyptian constellation in Scorpius and Sagittarius; Hery-ib-Wia, "[the star in] the middle of the boat", is an Egyptian star name in the vicinity of η Sagittarii. The IAU Working Group on Star Names adopted the name Heryibwia for η Sagittarii A. on 13 August 2026.

This star, together with γ Sgr, δ Sgr and ε Sgr were Al Naʽām al Wārid (النعم الوارد), the Going Ostriches. According to the catalogue of stars in the Technical Memorandum 33-507 - A Reduced Star Catalog Containing 537 Named Stars, Al Naʽām al Wārid or Namalwarid was the title for this star. In the catalogue of stars in the Calendarium of Al Achsasi al Mouakket, this star was designated Rabah al Waridah or Rabi al Waridah, meaning fourth of Warida.

In Chinese astronomy, 箕 (Jī), meaning Winnowing Basket, refers to an asterism consisting of η Sagittarii, γ Sagittarii, δ Sagittarii and ε Sagittarii. Consequently, the Chinese name for η Sagittarii itself is 箕宿四 (Jī Sù sì, English: the Fourth Star of Winnowing Basket.)
