= Psi Sagittarii =

Triple star system in the constellation Sagittarius

- Location of ψ Sagittarii (circled in red)

Observation data Epoch J2000.0 Equinox J2000.0 (ICRS)
- Constellation: Sagittarius
- Right ascension: 19^{h} 15^{m} 32.42658^{s}
- Declination: −25° 15′ 24.0569″
- Apparent magnitude (V): +4.86

Characteristics
- Spectral type: K2 III + A9 III + A3 V
- B−V color index: 0.569±0.006

Astrometry
Radial velocity (R_{v})	−11.43±1.47 km/s
Proper motion (μ)	RA: +45.50 mas/yr Dec.: −31.08 mas/yr
Parallax (π)	10.93±0.31 mas
Distance	298 ± 8 ly (91 ± 3 pc)
Absolute magnitude (M_{V})	0.06

Orbit
Period (P)	7,319 d
Eccentricity (e)	0.51
Periastron epoch (T)	2442418.795 JD
Argument of periastron (ω) (secondary)	2.6°
Semi-amplitude (K_{1}) (primary)	10.0 km/s
Semi-amplitude (K_{2}) (secondary)	13.8 km/s

Details

A
Mass	2.10 M_{☉}
Luminosity	84 L_{☉}

Ba/Bb
Mass	1.70/2.70 M_{☉}

Other designations
- ψ Sgr, 42 Sgr, CPD−25°6737, HD 179950, HIP 94643, HR 7292, SAO 187882, WDS J19155-2515

Database references
SIMBAD	data

Psi Sagittarii, which is Latinized from ψ Sagittarii, is a triple star system in the zodiac constellation of Sagittarius. The star system is located at a distance of 298 light years from the Earth based on parallax, but is drifting closer with a heliocentric radial velocity of −12 km/s. The system is faintly visible to the naked eye has a combined apparent visual magnitude of +4.86.

The inner pair of this triple star system, components Ba and Bb, have an orbital period of 10.78 days and an eccentricity of 0.47. The pair consist of an A-type giant and a less evolved A-type main-sequence star with stellar classifications of A9 III + A3 V, respectively. These in turn share an orbit with the primary, component A, having a period of 20 years and an eccentricity of 0.51. The last is an orange-hued K-type giant with a class of K2 III.

== Name and etymology ==
According to R. H. Allen's Star Names, this star, together with τ Sgr, ν Sgr, ω Sgr, 60 Sgr and ζ Sgr formed the Arabic asterisms Al Udḥiyy, the Ostrich's Nest, and Al Kiladah, the Necklace. The catalogue of stars in the Technical Memorandum 33-507 - A Reduced Star Catalog Containing 537 Named Stars listed this star with the name Al Kiladah. Based on a different identification, the IAU Working Group on Star Names assigned the name Alqiladah to ο Sagittarii in 2026.
