= Delta Sagittarii =

Double binary star in the constellation Sagittarius

- Location of δ Sagittarii (circled)

Observation data Epoch J2000.0 Equinox ICRS
- Constellation: Sagittarius
- Right ascension: 18^{h} 20^{m} 59.64354^{s}
- Declination: −29° 49′ 41.1659″
- Apparent magnitude (V): +2.70

Characteristics
- Spectral type: K3 III
- U−B color index: +1.55
- B−V color index: +1.38

Astrometry
Radial velocity (R_{v})	–19.9 km/s
Proper motion (μ)	RA: +32.54 mas/yr Dec.: −25.57 mas/yr
Parallax (π)	9.38±0.18 mas
Distance	348 ± 7 ly (107 ± 2 pc)
Absolute magnitude (M_{V})	−1.99

Details

δ Sgr A
Mass	3.21 M_{☉}
Radius	76.83 (Note: Calculated, using the Stefan-Boltzmann law and the star's effective temperature and luminosity, with respect to the solar nominal effective temperature of 5,772 K: $$\sqrt{\biggl(\frac{5,772}{4,203}\biggr)^4 \cdot 10^{3.22}} = 76.83\ R_\odot.$$) R_{☉}
Luminosity	1,660 L_{☉}
Surface gravity (log g)	0.30 cgs
Temperature	4,203±69 K
Metallicity [Fe/H]	−0.32 dex
Rotational velocity (v sin i)	3.6 km/s
Age	260 Myr

Other designations
- Kaus Media, Kaus Meridionalis, Media, δ Sgr, CPD−30°5513, FK5 687, GC 25024, GJ 710.1, GJ 9626, HD 168454, HIP 89931, HR 6859, SAO 186681, PPM 268275, CCDM J18210-2950A, WDS J18210-2950A

Database references
SIMBAD	Delta Sagittarii

Delta Sagittarii (δ Sagittarii, abbreviated Delta Sgr, δ Sgr), formally named Kaus Media /ˌkɔːs ˈmiːdiə/, is a star in the southern zodiac constellation of Sagittarius. The apparent visual magnitude of this star is +2.70, making it easily visible to the naked eye. Parallax measurements place the distance at roughly 348 light-years (107 parsecs) from the Sun.

== Properties ==
Eggleton and Tokovinin (2008) list Delta Sagittarii as a binary star system consisting of an evolved K-type giant star with a stellar classification of K3 III, and a white dwarf companion. The giant has an estimated mass three times that of the Sun, and is most likely fusing helium to carbon in its core. It has an estimated 3.21 times the mass of the Sun and is about 260 million years old.

Delta Sagittarii has three dim visual companions:

- a 14th magnitude star at a separation of 26 arcseconds,
- a 15th magnitude star at a separation of 40 arcseconds, and
- a 13th magnitude star at a separation of 58 arcseconds from the primary.

== Nomenclature ==
δ Sagittarii (Latinised to Delta Sagittarii) is the star's Bayer designation.

It bore the traditional names Kaus Media, Kaus Meridionalis, and Media, which derive from the Arabic: قوس qaws ('bow') and Latin: media ('middle'). In 2016, the International Astronomical Union organized a Working Group on Star Names (WGSN) to catalog and standardize proper names for stars. The WGSN's first bulletin of July 2016 included a table of the first two batches of names approved by the WGSN; which included Kaus Media for this star.

In the catalogue of stars in the Calendarium of Al Achsasi al Mouakket, this star was designated Thani al Waridah, meaning 'second of Warida'.

In Chinese astronomy, 箕 Jī ('Winnowing Basket') refers to an asterism consisting of Delta Sagittarii, Gamma^{2} Sagittarii, Epsilon Sagittarii and Eta Sagittarii. Consequently, the Chinese name for Delta Sagittarii itself is 箕宿二 Jī Sù èr ('the Second Star of Winnowing Basket').

This star, together with Gamma Sagittarii, Epsilon Sagittarii, Zeta Sagittarii, Lambda Sagittarii, Sigma Sagittarii, Tau Sagittarii and Phi Sagittarii, comprises the Teapot asterism.

In Hindu astrology, this star is also called Purvashada Nakshatra.
