= Mu Sagittarii =

Multiple star system in the constellation Sagittarius

μ Sagittarii
- Location of μ Sgr (circled)

Observation data Epoch J2000.0 Equinox ICRS
- Constellation: Sagittarius
- A
- Right ascension: 18^{h} 13^{m} 45.8^{s}
- Declination: −21° 03′ 32″
- Apparent magnitude (V): +3.85

Characteristics

μ Sgr A
- Evolutionary stage: Blue supergiant (Aa)
- Spectral type: B8Iap + B1.5V
- U−B color index: −0.52
- B−V color index: +0.22
- Variable type: Algol + α Cyg

μ Sgr B
- Evolutionary stage: main sequence
- Spectral type: B9III
- U−B color index: −0.11
- B−V color index: −0.04

μ Sgr D
- Evolutionary stage: main sequence
- Spectral type: B2IV
- U−B color index: −0.57
- B−V color index: +0.11

μ Sgr E
- Evolutionary stage: main sequence
- Spectral type: B2.5V
- U−B color index: −0.67
- B−V color index: +0.04

Astrometry
Absolute magnitude (M_{V})	A: −7.1; B: −1.2; D: −3.3; E: −2.1

D
Parallax (π)	0.6455±0.0629 mas
Distance	4,892.18±17.64 ly (1,499.95±5.41 pc)

E
Parallax (π)	0.6437±0.038 mas
Distance	4,959.5±99.15 ly (1,520.59±30.4 pc)

Details

μ Sgr Aa
Mass	23 M_{☉}
Radius	115 R_{☉}
Luminosity	180,000 L_{☉}
Surface gravity (log g)	1.75 cgs
Temperature	12,200 K

μ Sgr Ab
Mass	9.8 - 15 M_{☉}
Radius	12.2 R_{☉}
Surface gravity (log g)	4.0 cgs
Temperature	23,000 K
Age	10 Myr

μ Sgr B
Mass	3.963+0.176 −0.149 M_{☉}
Radius	4.39+0.91 −0.21 R_{☉}
Luminosity	3,281+500 −300 L_{☉}
Surface gravity (log g)	3.72±0.80 cgs
Temperature	13,641+935 −201 K
Metallicity [Fe/H]	−0.72+0.39 −0.10 dex

μ Sgr D
Mass	5.940+0.269 −0.228 M_{☉}
Radius	4.95+0.30 −0.45 R_{☉}
Luminosity	1,764+398 −270 L_{☉}
Surface gravity (log g)	3.82+0.07 −0.05 cgs
Temperature	16,487+272 −200 K
Metallicity [Fe/H]	0.55+0.19 −0.17 dex

μ Sgr E
Mass	6.47±0.21 M_{☉}
Radius	6.36+0.36 −0.31 R_{☉}
Luminosity	2,668+337 −298 L_{☉}
Surface gravity (log g)	3.55±0.03 cgs
Temperature	16,700+200 −300 K
Metallicity [Fe/H]	−0.37+0.10 −0.11 dex

Other designations
- μ Sgr, 13 Sgr, CCDM J18138-2104, WDS J18138-2104, IDS 18078-2105
- μ Sgr ABC: Polis, BD−21°4908, FK5 682, GC 24856, HD 166937, HIP 89341, HR 6812, SAO 186497, PPM 268080
- μ Sgr D: BD−21°4907, HD 314059
- μ Sgr E: BD−21°4909, HD 314057, 2MASS J18134906-2103528

Database references
SIMBAD	μ Sgr A
- μ Sgr B
- μ Sgr C
- μ Sgr D
- μ Sgr E

Mu Sagittarii (μ Sagittarii, abbreviated Mu Sgr, μ Sgr) is a multiple star system in the constellation of Sagittarius. The brightest component, a blue supergiant designated Mu Sagittarii Aa, is formally named Polis /ˈpɒlɪs/. The system is 5,000 light-years from the Sun and is part of the Sgr OB1 stellar association.

== System ==
The components of the Mu Sagittarii system are designated 'A' through 'E', in order of their distance from the brightest, which is Mu Sagittarii A. 'A' is itself a spectroscopic binary with components designated Mu Sagittarii Aa and Ab. Of the five visible stars, component C is considered an optical double, not physically close to the other stars. Component D has also been listed as a purely optical double by some authors, but others consider it to be part of a trapezium system of four gravitationally bound stars (plus an unseen companion).

Component	Apparent Magnitude	Separation from Mu Sagittarii A	Minimum distance from Mu Sagittarii A
A	+3.88	-	-
B	+8.04	16.9 arcseconds	42 200 AU or 0.67 ly
C	+10.99	25.8 arcseconds	64 500 AU or 1.02 ly
D	+9.63	48.5 arcseconds	121 200 AU or 1.92 ly
E	+9.25	50.0 arcseconds	125 000 AU or 1.98 ly

== Nomenclature ==
μ Sagittarii (Latinised to Mu Sagittarii) is the system's Bayer designation. The designations of the five constituents as Mu Sagittarii A, B, C, D and E, and those of A's components - Mu Sagittarii Aa and Ab - derive from the convention used by the Washington Multiplicity Catalog (WMC) for multiple star systems, and adopted by the International Astronomical Union (IAU).

The system occurs in the lunar station that was given the name πολις polis in a Coptic manuscript list of lunar stations, all of which Crum concluded were of Greek origin, in this case from polis "city", which is a literal translation of the Arabic lunar station name Albaldah. R. H. Allen's Star Names instead translated Polis as "a foal". The Rhoads (1971) catalog of named stars listed μ Sagittarii as Alnam, from the Arabic al-Naʿām "the ostriches".

In 2016, the IAU organized a Working Group on Star Names (WGSN) to catalog and standardize proper names for stars. The WGSN decided to attribute proper names to individual stars rather than entire multiple systems. It approved the name Polis for the component Mu Sagittarii Aa on 5 September 2017 and it is now so included in the List of IAU-approved Star Names.

In Chinese, 斗 (Dǒu), meaning Dipper, refers to an asterism consisting of Mu Sagittarii, Phi Sagittarii, Lambda Sagittarii, Sigma Sagittarii, Tau Sagittarii and Zeta Sagittarii. Consequently, the Chinese name for Mu Sagittarii itself is 斗宿三 (Dǒu Sù sān, English: the Third Star of Dipper.)

== Properties ==
=== Variability ===
Mu Sagittarii A varies in brightness and is classified as a variable star. The two spectroscopic components eclipse each other with an orbital period of 181 days, causing a 0.08 magnitude drop in brightness (from +3.84 to +3.96). In addition, it shows more irregular variations typical of an Alpha Cygni variable, irregularly pulsating hot supergiant stars.

=== Physical ===
Mu Sagittarii A appears as a type-B giant star with a total luminosity of 180,000 times that of the Sun and a radius of 115 times the Sun's. This means that Mu Sagittarii Aa's diameter is greater than that of the orbit of Mercury, or a little more than one astronomical unit (the average distance from Earth to the Sun). Its mass is 23 times the solar mass while it has a surface temperature of 11,100 K. Mu Sagittarii Aa is a type B8 blue supergiant and the companion (Mu Sagitarii Ab) is a type B2 giant. Its high mass means it has sufficient mass to end its life in a core-collapse supernova explosion.

The remaining components are very weakly bound to the Polis system, and although Mu Sagittarii is visible to the naked eye, the properties of the secondary components are highly uncertain.

The apparent magnitude for component B has been measured at between +8.04 and 10.481, leading to uncertainties about its physical properties, distance, and membership of the system. The Washington Double Star Catalog gives a magnitude of 10.48 and the Catalog of Components of Double and Multiple Stars a magnitude of 11.5.

Component D has an early B spectral type, near B3. The full MK spectral type has been measured as B2 IV, and the assumption of a subgiant luminosity suggests that it is more distant than the other stars of the system. The spectral type has also been estimated photometrically as B2 V, and a main sequence luminosity matches the distance of the other stars. Components D and E are located about 5,100 light-years from Earth based on their Gaia Data Release 3 parallaxes.
