= Lambda Sagittarii =

Orange-hued giant star in the constellation Sagittarius

λ Sagittarii
- Location of λ Sagittarii (circled)

Observation data Epoch J2000 Equinox ICRS
- Constellation: Sagittarius
- Right ascension: 18^{h} 27^{m} 58.24072^{s}
- Declination: −25° 25′ 18.1146″
- Apparent magnitude (V): +2.813

Characteristics
- Spectral type: K1IIIb
- U−B color index: +0.903
- B−V color index: +1.045

Astrometry
Radial velocity (R_{v})	−43.5 km/s
Proper motion (μ)	RA: −44.76 mas/yr Dec.: −185.66 mas/yr
Parallax (π)	41.72±0.16 mas
Distance	78.2 ± 0.3 ly (23.97 ± 0.09 pc)
Absolute magnitude (M_{V})	0.76±0.03

Details
Mass	1.79±0.20 M_{☉}
Radius	11.234±0.181 R_{☉}
Luminosity	58.79±2.61 L_{☉}
Surface gravity (log g)	2.66±0.10 cgs
Temperature	4,768±36 K
Metallicity [Fe/H]	−0.11±0.03 dex
Rotational velocity (v sin i)	3.81 km/s

Other designations
- Kaus Borealis, λ Sgr, 22 Sagittarii, CPD−25 6523, FK5 692, GC 25180, HD 169916, HIP 90496, HR 6913, SAO 186841, PPM 268438

Database references
SIMBAD	data

Lambda Sagittarii (Latinized from λ Sagittarii), formally named Kaus Borealis /ˈkɔːs bɒriˈælɪs/, is a star in the southern constellation of Sagittarius. The star marks the top of the Archer's bow.

== Properties ==
With an apparent visual magnitude of +2.81, this is one of the brighter members of the constellation and, according to the Bortle Dark-Sky Scale, it is readily visible to the naked eye. Based upon parallax measurements, it is 78.2 light-years (24.0 parsecs) from the Sun.

Being 2.1 degrees south of the ecliptic, Lambda Sgr is sometimes occulted by the Moon and, rarely, by a planet. The last planet to pass in front of it was Venus, on 19 November 1984. The previous occasion was 5 December 1865, when it was occulted by Mercury.

Kaus Borealis is a giant star with a stellar classification of K1 IIIb. It has a mass 1.8 times that of the Sun and a physical size of about 11.2 times the Sun's radius. This expanded outer envelope is radiating energy at an effective temperature of 4,768 K, causing it to glow with the cool orange hue of a K-type star. It appears to be rotating at a leisurely rate, with a projected rotational velocity of 3.81 km s^{−1}.

== Observation ==
On 17 December 2021, it had a close conjunction (geocentric separation <1') with Mercury.

== Nomenclature ==
λ Sagittarii (Latinised to Lambda Sagittarii) is the star's Bayer designation.

It bore the traditional name Kaus Borealis, which derives from the Arabic قوس qaws 'bow' and Latin boreālis 'northern'. In 2016, the International Astronomical Union organized a Working Group on Star Names (WGSN) to catalog and standardize proper names for stars. The WGSN's first bulletin of July 2016 included a table of the first two batches of names approved by the WGSN; which included Kaus Borealis for this star.

This star, with Gamma Sagittarii, Delta Sagittarii, Epsilon Sagittarii, Zeta Sagittarii, Sigma Sagittarii, Tau Sagittarii and Phi Sagittarii comprises the Teapot asterism.

In the catalogue of stars in the Calendarium of Al Achsasi al Mouakket, this star was designated Rai al Naaim, which was translated into Latin as Pastor Struthionum, meaning keeper of the ostriches.

This star is Al Tizini's Rāʽi al Naʽāïm (ألراع ٱلنعم), the Keeper of the Naʽams (Ostrich), meaning the "keeper" the two asterisms al-Naʽām al-Wārid ( النعام الوارد ), "The Going Ostriches" and al-Naʽām al-Ṣādir (النعم الصادر), "The Returning Ostriches".

In Chinese, 斗 (Dǒu), meaning Dipper, refers to an asterism consisting of Lambda Sagittarii, Phi Sagittarii, Mu Sagittarii, Sigma Sagittarii, Tau Sagittarii and Zeta Sagittarii. Consequently, Lambda Sagittarii itself is 斗宿二 (Dǒu Sù èr, English: the Second Star of Dipper.)
