= Dipper (Chinese constellation) =

One of the Twenty-eight mansions of the Chinese constellations

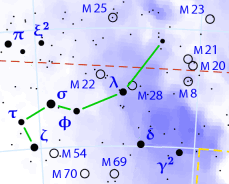
South Dipper map

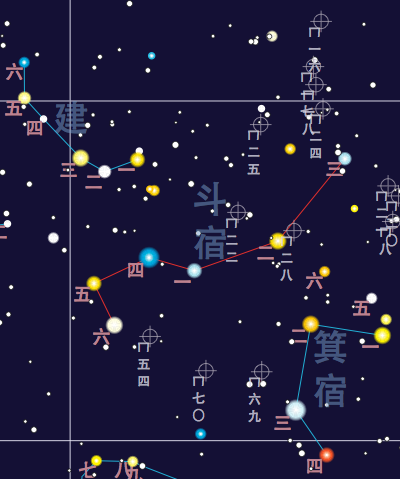
Dǒu Xiù map

The Dipper mansion (斗宿, pinyin: Dǒu Xiù) is one of the Twenty-eight mansions of the Chinese constellations. It is one of the northern mansions of the Black Tortoise. In Taoism, it is known as the "Six Stars of the Southern Dipper" (南斗六星, Nándǒu liù xīng), in contrast to the Big Dipper north to this mansion.

== Asterisms ==
English name	Chinese name	European constellation	Number of stars	Representing
Dipper	斗	Sagittarius	6	Shaped like the Big Dipper, also refers temple in the sky or the snake-shaped basalt
Establishment	建	Sagittarius	6	Sun, moon and star are related by the city, also refers to the flag
Market Officer	天弁	Aquila/Scutum	9	Officials of the market
River Turtle	鱉	Telescopium/Corona Australis	11	The river turtles
Celestial Cock	天雞	Sagittarius	2	Chicken in the sky, the God's chicken
Celestial Keyhole	天籥	Ophiuchus/Sagittarius	8	Locks open and close by the ecliptic
Dog Territory	狗國	Sagittarius	4	The territory of the Dog; or the realm of the mythical dog-warrior Panhu
Celestial Spring	天淵	Sagittarius	3	Pond in the sky
Dog	狗	Sagittarius	2	Guardian dog at the gate
Peasant	農丈人	Sagittarius	1	Director of palm farming

== Stars ==
- ζ Sgr
- τ Sgr
- σ Sgr
- φ Sgr
- λ Sgr
- μ Sgr
