= W Sagittarii =

Star in the constellation Sagittarius

- Location of W Sgr (circled)

Observation data Epoch J2000 Equinox ICRS
- Constellation: Sagittarius
- Right ascension: 18^{h} 05^{m} 01.22643^{s}
- Declination: −29° 34′ 48.3222″
- Apparent magnitude (V): 4.29 - 5.14

Characteristics

Aa1
- Spectral type: F4 - G2Ib
- U−B color index: +0.52
- B−V color index: +0.78
- Variable type: δ Cep

Aa2
- Spectral type: A5V - F5V

Ab
- Spectral type: A0 V

Astrometry
Radial velocity (R_{v})	−28.04 km/s
Proper motion (μ)	RA: +4.372 mas/yr Dec.: −5.588 mas/yr
Parallax (π)	2.365±0.1765 mas
Distance	1,400 ± 100 ly (420 ± 30 pc)
Absolute magnitude (M_{V})	−3.76

Orbit
Primary	Aa1
Secondary	Aa2
Period (P)	4.33±0.01 yr
Semi-major axis (a)	12.9 ± 0.3" (5.67 ± 0.13 AU)
Eccentricity (e)	0.41 ± 0.02
Inclination (i)	7.0 ± 0.8°
Longitude of the node (Ω)	68.4 ± 4.0°
Periastron epoch (T)	2004.16 ± 0.01
Argument of periastron (ω) (secondary)	328.0 ± 1.3°

Orbit
Primary	Aa
Secondary	Ab
Period (P)	172.9 yr
Semi-major axis (a)	63 AU

Details

Aa
Mass	5.8 M_{☉}
Radius	61.0 R_{☉}
Luminosity	2,690 L_{☉}
Surface gravity (log g)	1.50 - 2.15 cgs
Temperature	5,380 - 6,474 K
Metallicity [Fe/H]	+0.02 dex

Aa2
Mass	1.4 - 2.0 M_{☉}

Ab
Mass	2.2 M_{☉}

Other designations
- Dhanuśarāgra, γ^{1} Sgr, W Sgr, CD−29 14447, HD 164975, HIP 88567, HR 6742, SAO 186237, ADS 11029, CCDM J18050-2935A

Database references
SIMBAD	data

W Sagittarii, also named Dhanuśarāgra /dʌnuːʃɑːrɑːɡrɑː/, is a multiple star system star in the constellation Sagittarius, and a Cepheid variable star.

W Sagittarii is an optical line-of-sight companion nearly a degree from the much brighter γ^{2} Sgr (Alnasl) which marks the nozzle or spout of the teapot asterism.

== Nomenclature ==
W Sagittarii (abbreviated W Sgr) is this star's variable star designation; it also has the Bayer designation Gamma^{1} Sagittarii (γ^{1} Sagittarii, γ^{1} Sgr).

Dhanuśarāgra (धनुशराग्र), the Arrow, is an Indian star name used since the 14th century for the pair γ^{1} and γ^{2} Sgr, the latter having the Arabic name Alnasl. The IAU Working Group on Star Names adopted the name Dhanuśarāgra for γ^{1} Sgr Aa1 on 13 August 2026.

== System ==
W Sgr is listed as component A of a multiple star system catalogued as ADS 11029 and WDS J18050-2935. Components B and C are at 33" and 46" respectively and both are 13th magnitude. They are purely optical companions, not physically associated with W Sgr.

Component A, W Sgr, is itself a triple star system, with the components referred to as W Sgr Aa1, Aa2, and Ab. These have also been referred to as components Aa, Ab, and B respectively. The outer companion Ab has been resolved at a separation of 0.14" and is over 5 magnitudes fainter than the primary supergiant. The inner components can only be identified spectroscopically by their radial velocity variations. The primary is a 6 M_{☉} yellow supergiant, while the secondary is an early F main sequence star with a mass less than 1.4 M_{☉}.

== Variability ==
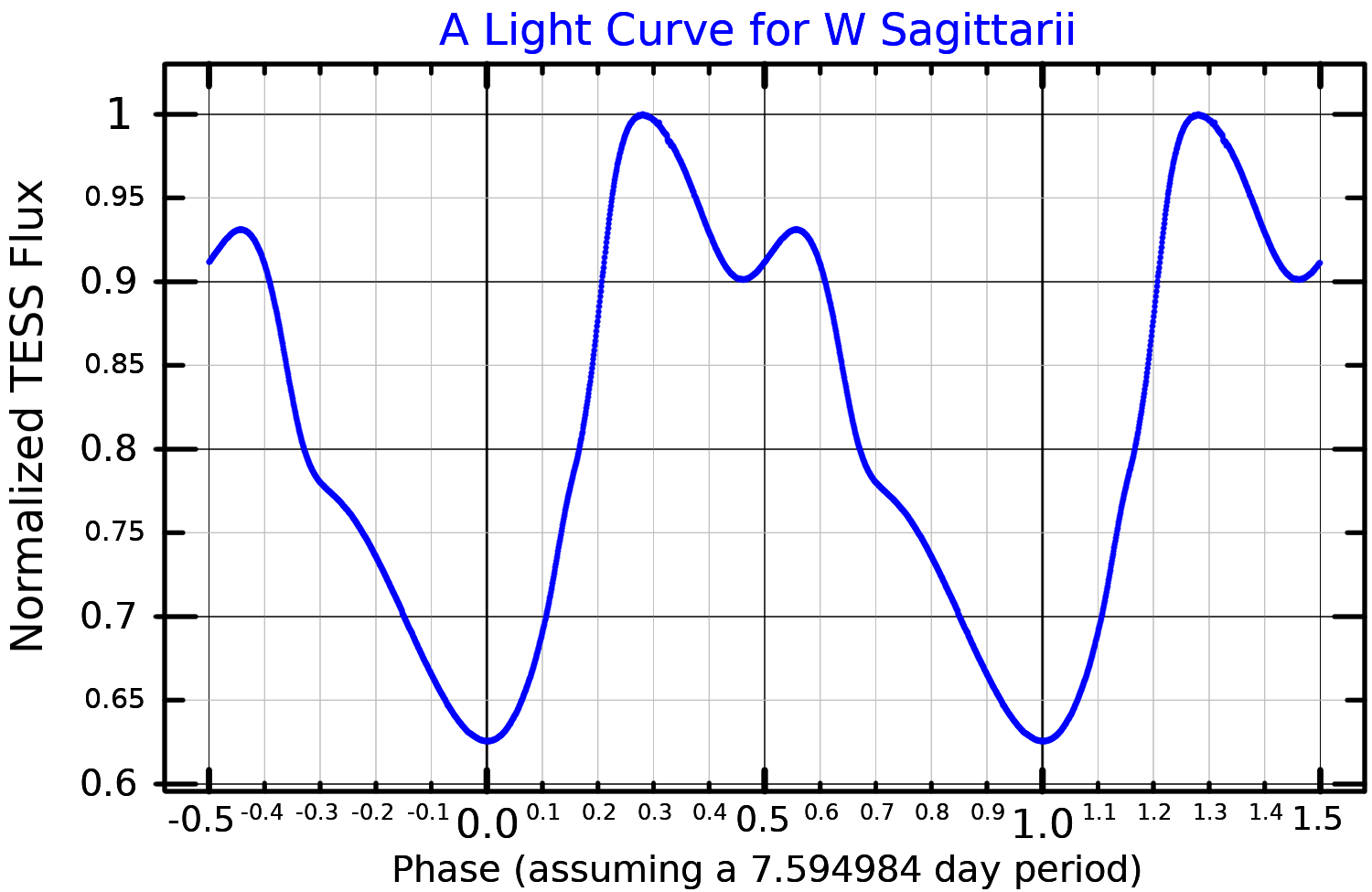
A light curve for W Sagittarii, plotted from TESS data

In early June of 1866, Johann Friedrich Julius Schmidt discovered that the star is a variable star. The supergiant component W Sgr Aa1 pulsates regularly between magnitudes 4.3 and 5.1 every 7.59 days. During the pulsations, that temperature and spectral type also vary. It is classified as a Classical Cepheid (δ Cephei) variable.
