= Edward Knobel =

British astronomer (1841–1930)

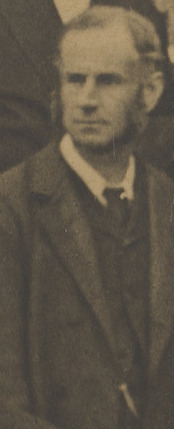
Edward Knobel at the 1887 IAU meeting

Edward Ball Knobel (21 October 1841 – 25 July 1930) was an English businessman and amateur astronomer. He was born in London, England.

He started to study law but his love of geology made him change to the Government School of Mines (now part of Imperial College London) in 1861. In 1862, he changed his career again, starting to work for Bass & Co. at Burton upon Trent as an analytical chemist in the brewery department. He rose to become a manager and Head Brewer. He then became a manager of a Courtauld's silk factory at Bocking in 1875. His final position was with the Ilford Photographic Company.

In 1872, he purchased an 8.5 inch reflecting telescope to further his interest in astronomy. His work on a publication about the chronology of star catalogues in 1875 let him to study the work of early Arab astronomers and learn some Arabic and Persian. He then prepared a new edition of the star catalogue in the Almagest using all available sources in Greek, Arabic and Latin. After a long collaboration with C. H. F. Peters, a final collated version was published in 1915. In 1917 he published a translation of Ulugh Beg's star catalogue. He was President of both the British Astronomical Association and the Royal Astronomical Society (1892–1893 and 1900–1901).

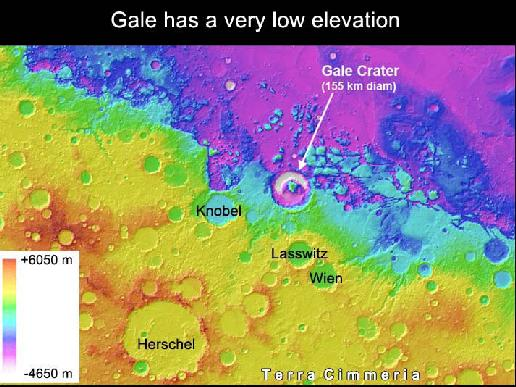
The Knobel Crater is located next to the Gale (crater)

A crater on Mars was named in his honour.

== Family ==
One of Knobel's daughters, Emily Maud Knobel, was a Fellow of the Zoological Society and an expert on parrots, particularly their care in captivity.
