= Nu2 Sagittarii =

Star in the constellation Sagittarius

Nu^{2} Sagittarii
- Location of ν^{2} Sagittarii (circled)

Observation data Epoch J2000.0 Equinox J2000.0 (ICRS)
- Constellation: Sagittarius
- Right ascension: 18^{h} 55^{m} 07.14098^{s}
- Declination: −22° 40′ 16.8185″
- Apparent magnitude (V): +4.98

Characteristics
- Spectral type: K1 Ib–II
- B−V color index: +1.32

Astrometry
Radial velocity (R_{v})	−109.6 km/s
Proper motion (μ)	RA: −109.04 mas/yr Dec.: −35.25 mas/yr
Parallax (π)	11.91±0.52 mas
Distance	270 ± 10 ly (84 ± 4 pc)
Absolute magnitude (M_{V})	+0.38

Details

ν^{2} Sgr A
Mass	1.44 M_{☉}
Radius	85 R_{☉}
Luminosity	120 L_{☉}
Surface gravity (log g)	1.03 cgs
Temperature	4,244±57 K
Metallicity [Fe/H]	−0.13 dex
Age	4.52 Gyr

Other designations
- Pabilsang, ν^{2} Sgr, 35 Sgr, BD−22°4915, HD 175190, HIP 92845, HR 7120, SAO 187445

Database references
SIMBAD	data

Nu^{2} Sagittarii (ν^{2} Sagittarii), also named Pabilsang /pɑːbɪlsɑːŋ/, is a binary star system in the zodiac constellation of Sagittarius. It is faintly visible to the naked eye, having an apparent visual magnitude of +4.98; it is 0.16 degree north of the ecliptic. The annual parallax shift of 11.91 mas as seen from Earth, indicates this system is roughly 270 light years from the Sun. Nu^{2} Sagittarii has a high peculiar velocity of 86.0+11.6
−14.4 km/s and is most likely a runaway star system.

The spectrum of the primary component displays a stellar classification of K1 Ib–II, indicating this is a K-type star with a mixed luminosity class of an evolved bright giant/supergiant star. It is a mild barium star, showing an enhanced abundance of s-process elements in its outer atmosphere. This material was most likely acquired during a previous mass transfer from its now white dwarf companion. The primary has an estimated 1.4 times the mass of the Sun and has expanded to 85 times the Sun's radius.

Pabilsaĝ was the original Sumerian name of the constellation Sagittarius; a god depicted as a centaur-like hybrid creature with a scorpion tail and wings. The IAU Working Group on Star Names adopted the name Pabilsang for Nu^{2} Sagittarii A on 13 August 2026.
