= Zeta Sagittarii =

Triple star system in the constellation Sagittarius

ζ Sagittarii
- Location of ζ Sagittarii (circled)

Observation data Epoch J2000.0 Equinox ICRS
- Constellation: Sagittarius
- Right ascension: 19^{h} 02^{m} 36.73024^{s}
- Declination: −29° 52′ 48.2279″
- Apparent magnitude (V): +2.59 (3.27 (A) / 3.48 (B))

Characteristics
- Spectral type: A2.5 Va
- U−B color index: +0.05
- B−V color index: +0.08

Astrometry
Radial velocity (R_{v})	+22 km/s
Proper motion (μ)	RA: +10.79 mas/yr Dec.: +21.11 mas/yr
Parallax (π)	36.98±0.87 mas
Distance	88 ± 2 ly (27.0 ± 0.6 pc)
Absolute magnitude (M_{V})	1.11 (A)/1.32 (B)

Orbit
Primary	Aa
Name	Ab
Period (P)	1 month
Semi-major axis (a)	0.3 au

Orbit
Primary	A
Name	B
Period (P)	21.03 ± 0.10 years
Semi-major axis (a)	0.493 ± 0.002" (13.2 au)
Eccentricity (e)	0.209 ± 0.002
Inclination (i)	110.8 ± 0.5°
Longitude of the node (Ω)	74.8 ± 1.0°
Periastron epoch (T)	B 2026.83 ± 0.20
Argument of periastron (ω) (secondary)	4.0 ± 3.5°

Details

Aa
Mass	1.83 M_{☉}
Radius	1.9 R_{☉}
Luminosity	14.9 (Note: Calculated, using the temperature and radius figures available by the Stefan-Boltzmann law:$R=\sqrt{(5772/T)^4 * L}$, where T is the temperature, R is the radius and L is the luminosity. 5772 is the solar nominal effective temperature, in Kelvins. GeoGebra is used to do calculation.) L_{☉}
Surface gravity (log g)	3.90 cgs
Temperature	8,230 K
Rotational velocity (v sin i)	77 km/s
Age	700 Myr

Ab
Mass	1.81 M_{☉}
Radius	1.9 R_{☉}
Luminosity	14.7 L_{☉}
Temperature	8,200 K
Age	700 Myr

B
Mass	2.03 M_{☉}
Radius	2.3 R_{☉}
Luminosity	24 L_{☉}
Temperature	8,460 K
Age	700 Myr

Other designations
- Ascella, ζ Sagittarii, ζ Sgr, Zeta Sgr, 38 Sagittarii, CCDM J19026-2953AB, CPD−30 5798, GC 26161, HD 176687, HIP 93506, HR 7194, IDS 18562-3001 AB, PPM 269230, SAO 187600, WDS J19026-2953AB

Database references
SIMBAD	data

Zeta Sagittarii (ζ Sagittarii, abbreviated Zeta Sgr, ζ Sgr) is a triple star system and the third-brightest star in the constellation of Sagittarius after Kaus Australis and Nunki. Based upon parallax measurements, it is about 88 light-years (27 parsecs) from the Sun.

The three components are designated Zeta Sagittarii Aa (officially named Ascella /əˈsɛlə/, the traditional name for the entire system), Ab and B. The Washington Double Star Catalog cites a component separated 72.3" from the system, but it is a background star unrelated to the pair.

== Nomenclature ==
ζ Sagittarii (Latinised to Zeta Sagittarii) is the system's Bayer designation. The designations of the three components as ζ Sagittarii Aa, Ab and B derive from the convention used by the Washington Multiplicity Catalog (WMC) for multiple star systems, and adopted by the International Astronomical Union (IAU).

It bore the traditional name Ascella, from a Late Latin word meaning armpit. In the catalogue of stars in the Calendarium of Al Achsasi al Mouakket, this star was designated Thalath al Sadirah, which was translated into Latin as Tertia τού al Sadirah, meaning third returning ostrich. In 2016, the IAU organized a Working Group on Star Names (WGSN) to catalogue and standardize proper names for stars. The WGSN decided to attribute proper names to individual stars rather than entire multiple systems. It approved the name Ascella for the component Zeta Sagittarii A on 12 September 2016 and it is now so included in the List of IAU-approved Star Names.

This star, together with Gamma2 Sagittarii, Delta Sagittarii, Epsilon Sagittarii, Lambda Sagittarii, Sigma Sagittarii, Tau Sagittarii and Phi Sagittarii comprise the Teapot asterism.

In Chinese, 斗 (Dǒu), meaning Dipper, refers to an asterism consisting of Zeta Sagittarii, Phi Sagittarii, Lambda Sagittarii, Mu Sagittarii, Sigma Sagittarii and Tau Sagittarii. Consequently, the Chinese name for Zeta Sagittarii itself is 斗宿一 (Dǒu Xiù yī, English: the First Star of Dipper).

== Properties ==
Zeta Sagittarii has a combined apparent visual magnitude of +2.59 and a combined spectral type A2Va. It is moving away from the Solar System with a radial velocity of 22 km s^{−1}, and some one million years ago, came within 11 pc (36 ly) of the Sun.

Zeta Sagittarii Aa and Ab form an inner pair with an orbital period estimated to be roughly one month and a separation 0.3 au. They are similar-sized A-type stars, having 1.8 times the mass and 1.9 times the radius of the Sun. When these stars evolve and become red giants, around 500 million years in the future, they are expected to evolve into a common envelope phase, either merging and becoming a single white dwarf or a close binary system of two WDs.

The outer component, named Zeta Sagittarii B, forms a visual binary with the inner pair. It is separated by 13 au and has an orbital period of 21 years. It is the largest and most massive star in the system, 2.3 times larger and two times more massive than the Sun. It is expected to end its life as a 0.7 M_{☉} white dwarf, around 700 million years in the future.

Based upon data obtained by the Hipparcos mission, Zeta Sagittarii was predicted to be the brightest star in the night sky around 1.2 million years ago, peaking with an apparent magnitude of −2.74. However a 2023 analysis discarded this hypothesis, as the closest distance to the Sun has been recalculated to 36 light-years, much further away than the previously estimated 10 light-years.
