= Chi1 Sagittarii =

Star in the constellation Sagittarius

Chi^{1} Sagittarii
- Location of χ^{1} Sagittari (circled)

Observation data Epoch J2000.0 Equinox J2000.0 (ICRS)
- Constellation: Sagittarius
- Right ascension: 19^{h} 25^{m} 16.49013^{s}
- Declination: −24° 30′ 30.8599″
- Apparent magnitude (V): +5.03 (5.46 + 5.96)

Characteristics
- Evolutionary stage: main sequence
- Spectral type: A3/5 IV/V (A2IV + A5IV)
- B−V color index: +0.23

Astrometry
Radial velocity (R_{v})	−43.4±1.6 km/s
Proper motion (μ)	RA: +61.63 mas/yr Dec.: −50.66 mas/yr
Parallax (π)	13.25±0.07 mas
Distance	246 ± 1 ly (75.5 ± 0.4 pc)
Absolute magnitude (M_{V})	+0.59

Orbit
Period (P)	5.6985±0.0015 yr
Semi-major axis (a)	0.0664±0.0003″
Eccentricity (e)	0.7099±0.0033
Inclination (i)	93.02±0.50°
Longitude of the node (Ω)	80.15±0.55°
Periastron epoch (T)	B 2023.9455±0.0010
Argument of periastron (ω) (secondary)	354.19±0.75°

Details

Chi^{1} Sgr A
Mass	2.09±0.02 M_{☉}

Chi^{1} Sgr B
Mass	1.78±0.01 M_{☉}

Other designations
- Chi^{1} Sgr, 47 Sgr, CPD−24°6721, HD 182369, HIP 95477, HR 7362, SAO 188101, WDS J19253-2431

Database references
SIMBAD	data

Chi^{1} Sagittarii (χ^{1} Sagittarii) is a binary star system in the zodiac constellation of Sagittarius. The pair have a combined apparent visual magnitude of +5.03, which is bright enough to be seen with the naked eye. Based upon a parallax of 13.25 mas, it is located around 246 light years away. It is advancing through space in the general direction of the Earth with a radial velocity of −43.4 km/s.

This is a visual binary with an orbital period of 5.6985 years, an eccentricity of 0.710, and an angular semimajor axis of 66.4 mas. The magnitude 5.46 primary, Chi^{1} Sagittarii A, has a mass 2.09 times that of the Sun, while the secondary, Chi^{1} Sagittarii B, has a mass 1.78 times solar and a magnitude of 5.96. Spectral types of A2IV and A5IV have been published for the primary and secondary component. A spectrum of A3/5 IV/V has been published, but Helmut Abt published spectral type of kA5hF0VmF0, typical of Am stars. This notation indicates it has the calcium K-lines of an A5 star, and the hydrogen and metal lines of an F0 star.
