= 60 Sagittarii =

Possible binary star system in the constellation Sagittarius

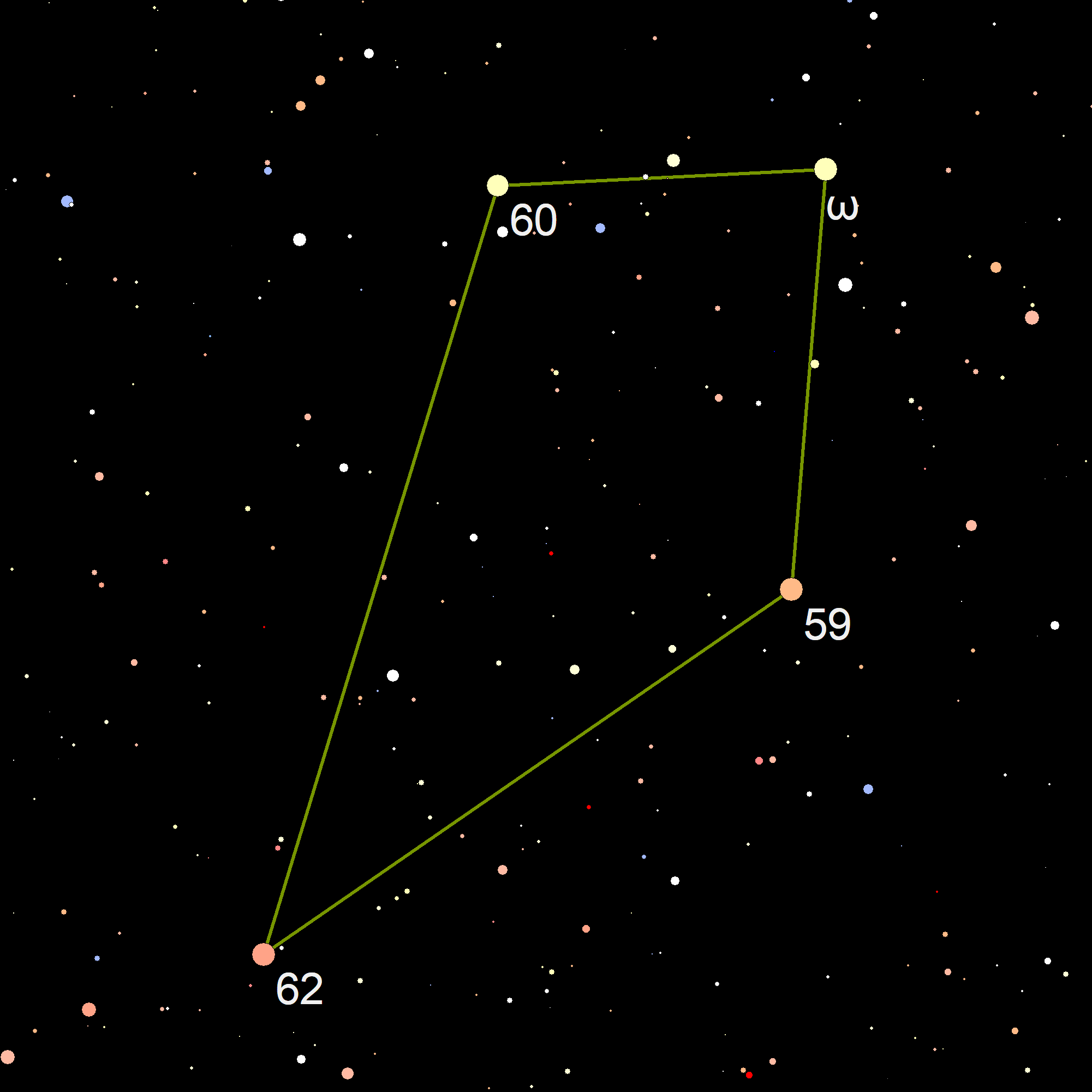
- The four stars of the Terebellum

Observation data Epoch J2000.0 Equinox J2000.0 (ICRS)
- Constellation: Sagittarius
- Right ascension: 19^{h} 58^{m} 57.20292^{s}
- Declination: −26° 11′ 44.7585″
- Apparent magnitude (V): 4.84

Characteristics
- Evolutionary stage: horizontal branch
- Spectral type: G6 III
- U−B color index: +0.55
- B−V color index: +0.882±0.038
- R−I color index: +0.47

Astrometry
Radial velocity (R_{v})	−51.1±2.4 km/s
Proper motion (μ)	RA: +35.31 mas/yr Dec.: +25.69 mas/yr
Parallax (π)	8.6025±0.1732 mas
Distance	379 ± 8 ly (116 ± 2 pc)
Absolute magnitude (M_{V})	−0.07

Details
Radius	17.42+0.68 −0.80 R_{☉}
Luminosity	170.3±4.0 L_{☉}
Surface gravity (log g)	2.78 cgs
Temperature	4,997+119 −96 K
Metallicity [Fe/H]	−0.38 dex

Other designations
- A Sgr, 60 Sgr, CD−26°14682, CPD−26°6895, GC 27658, HD 189005, HIP 98353, HR 7618, SAO 188778, PPM 270516

Database references
SIMBAD	data

60 Sagittarii is a suspected binary star system in the southern constellation of Sagittarius. It has the Bayer designation A Sagittarii, while 60 Sagittarii is the Flamsteed designation. This naked-eye object forms the northwest corner of the asterism called the Terebellum and, with an apparent magnitude of approximately 4.84, it is the dimmest of the four stars in the Terebellum. It is located 379 light-years from the Sun, based on parallax, but is moving closer with a radial velocity of −51 km/s.

The visible component is an aging G-type giant star with a stellar classification of G6 III, having exhausted the supply of hydrogen at its core and expanded to 17 the Sun's radius. In the Bright Star Catalogue it was listed with a class of G6 III Ba0.2, suggesting it is a mild barium star and thus might have a white dwarf companion. It is a red clump giant, indicating it is on the horizontal branch and is generating energy through the fusion of helium at its core. The star is radiating 170 times the luminosity of the Sun from its enlarged photosphere at an effective temperature of 4,997 K.
