= Gamma Sagittarii =

The Bayer designation γ Sagittarii (Gamma Sagittarii) is shared by two stars in the constellation Sagittarius:

- γ^{1} Sagittarii (Dhanusaragra), a Cepheid variable better-known as W Sagittarii
- γ^{2} Sagittarii (Alnasl), an orange giant

star	V mag.	Bayer (1603)	Flamsteed (1725)	Bevis (c.1750)	BSC^{5} (1991)	Tirion (1992)	Kostjuk (2002)	Sinnott (2006)
W Sgr	4.66	γ	γ^{1}	―	γ^{1} (W)	W	W	W
10 Sgr	2.99	γ	γ^{2}	γ	γ^{2}	γ	γ	γ

- "-": none

The two stars are separated by slightly under one degree.
