= Al Achsasi al Mouakket =

Egyptian astronomer

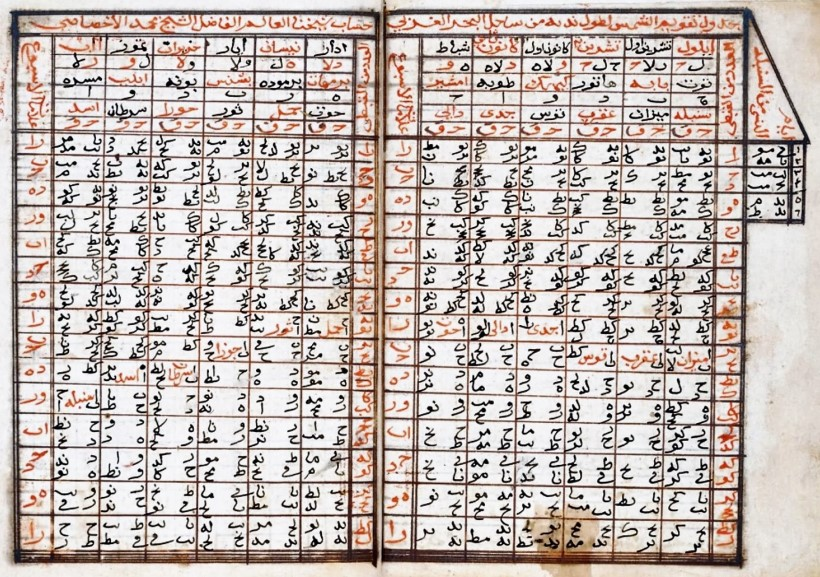
A page from al Achsasi's al-Durrah al-muḍīyah fī al-ʻamāl al-shamsīyah

Muḥammad al Achsasi al Mouakket (Arabic: محمد الاخصاصي الموقت) was a 17th-century Egyptian astronomer whose calendarium and catalogue of stars, al-Durrah al-muḍīyah fī al-ʻamāl al-shamsīyah ("Pearls of brilliance upon the solar operations"), was written in Cairo in about 1650. Al-Achsasi was a shaykh, a learned elder, of the Grand Mosque of the university of Cairo, where his name al-Muwaqqit reflected his position in regulating the times and hours at the mosque. Akhsasi connects him in origin to a village in the Faiyum, southwest of Cairo.

No copies of al-Achsasi's book were known to Western astronomers or historians of science until 1895, when the incomplete manuscript was obtained by the amateur English astronomer Edward Ball Knobel; thus al-Achsasi did not appear in the standard French and English bibliographies and library catalogues of the 19th century. Knobel announced his discovery of the work in the journal of the Royal Astronomical Society that year.

The extant manuscript is part of the archive collection of the Royal Astronomical Society. (RAS Add MS 14).

== Sources ==
- Knobel, Edward Ball (1895). "Al Achsasi Al Mouakket, on a catalogue of stars in the Calendarium of Mohammad Al Achsasi Al Mouakket". Monthly Notices of the Royal Astronomical Society. 55 (8): 429–438. Bibcode:1895MNRAS..55..429K. doi:10.1093/mnras/55.8.429.
