= List of stars in Sagittarius =

This is the list of notable stars in the constellation Sagittarius, sorted by decreasing brightness.

Name	B	F	G.	Var	HD	HIP	RA	Dec	vis. mag.	abs. mag.	Dist. (ly)	Sp. class	Notes
ε Sgr	ε	20	61		169022	90185	18^{h} 24^{m} 10.31840^{s}	−34° 23′ 0.46193″	1.85	−1.41	143±2	B9IVp	Kaus Australis, Thalith al Warida
σ Sgr	σ	34	112		175191	92855	18^{h} 55^{m} 15.92650^{s}	−26° 17′ 48.2068″	2.05	−2.14	224.7±9.8	B2.5V	Nunki, Thani al Sadira
ζ Sgr	ζ	38	130		176687	93506	19^{h} 02^{m} 36.72^{s}	−29° 52′ 48.4″	2.60	0.42	89	A3IV	Ascella, Thalith al Sadira
δ Sgr	δ	19	54		168454	89931	18^{h} 20^{m} 59.62^{s}	−29° 49′ 40.9″	2.72	−2.14	306	K3III	Kaus Media (Kaus Medius, Kaus Meridionalis, Thani al Warida)
λ Sgr	λ	22	67		169916	90496	18^{h} 27^{m} 58.27^{s}	−25° 25′ 16.5″	2.82	0.95	77	K1IIIb	Kaus Borealis
π Sgr	π	41	147		178524	94141	19^{h} 09^{m} 45.83^{s}	−21° 01′ 24.7″	2.88	−2.77	440	F2II/III	Al Baldah, Nir al Beldat, Lucida Oppidi
γ^{2} Sgr	γ^{2}	10	28		165135	88635	18^{h} 05^{m} 48.52^{s}	−30° 25′ 25.1″	2.98	0.63	96	K0III	Alnasl, Nash, Nushaba, Awal al Warida
η Sgr	η		46		167618	89642	18^{h} 17^{m} 37.73^{s}	−36° 45′ 40.6″	3.10	−0.20	149	M2III	Heryibwia, Rabi al Warida, Beta Telescopii, irregular variable
φ Sgr	φ	27	95		173300	92041	18^{h} 45^{m} 39.35^{s}	−26° 59′ 26.8″	3.17	−1.08	231	B8.5III	Nandou, Awal al Sadira
τ Sgr	τ	40	139		177716	93864	19^{h} 06^{m} 56.44^{s}	−27° 40′ 11.3″	3.32	0.48	120	K1/K2III	Rabi al Sadira, Hecatebolus
ξ^{2} Sgr	ξ^{2}	37	120		175775	93085	18^{h} 57^{m} 43.78^{s}	−21° 06′ 23.8″	3.52	−1.77	372	G8/K0II/III	Jian
ο Sgr	ο	39	136		177241	93683	19^{h} 04^{m} 40.93^{s}	−21° 44′ 28.9″	3.76	0.61	139	K0III	Alqiladah
μ Sgr	μ	13	41		166937	89341	18^{h} 13^{m} 45.81^{s}	−21° 03′ 31.8″	3.84		5000	B2III:	Polis; quintuple star; Algol variable
ρ^{1} Sgr	ρ^{1}	44	174		181577	95168	19^{h} 21^{m} 40.38^{s}	−17° 50′ 50.1″	3.92	1.06	122	F0III/IV	Kenemu, δ Sct variable
β^{1} Sgr	β^{1}		168		181454	95241	19^{h} 22^{m} 38.29^{s}	−44° 27′ 32.1″	3.96	−1.36	378	B9V	Arkab Prior
α Sgr	α		177		181869	95347	19^{h} 23^{m} 53.15^{s}	−40° 36′ 56.3″	3.96	0.38	170	B8V	Rukbat, Alrami
ι Sgr	ι		241		188114	98032	19^{h} 55^{m} 15.68^{s}	−41° 52′ 06.3″	4.12	0.30	189	K0III	
β^{2} Sgr	β^{2}		172		181623	95294	19^{h} 23^{m} 13.06^{s}	−44° 47′ 58.7″	4.27	1.13	139	F2III	Arkab Posterior
θ^{1} Sgr	θ^{1}		256		189103	98412	19^{h} 59^{m} 44.17^{s}	−35° 16′ 34.5″	4.37	−2.02	617	B2.5IV	
62 Sgr	c	62	265	V3872	189763	98688	20^{h} 02^{m} 39.46^{s}	−27° 42′ 35.6″	4.43	−1.26	448	M4III	Gouguo, V3872 Sgr; part of the Terebellum; irregular variable
υ Sgr	υ	46	176		181615	95176	19^{h} 21^{m} 43.62^{s}	−15° 57′ 18.0″	4.52	−4.03	1672	B2Vpe+A2IaS	the prototypical hydrogen-deficient binary; Be star
X Sgr		3	2	X	161592	87072	17^{h} 47^{m} 33.63^{s}	−27° 49′ 50.7″	4.53	−3.06	1076	F7II	Cepheid variable
59 Sgr	b^{1}	59	250		188603	98162	19^{h} 56^{m} 56.82^{s}	−27° 10′ 11.5″	4.54	−3.30	1207	K3III	part of the Terebellum
HD 165634			31		165634	88839	18^{h} 08^{m} 04.96^{s}	−28° 27′ 25.3″	4.55	−0.59	348	K0IIICNpvar	
52 Sgr	h^{2}	52	207		184707	96465	19^{h} 36^{m} 42.39^{s}	−24° 53′ 00.8″	4.59	0.77	189	B8/B9V	
γ^{1} Sgr	γ^{1}		26	W	164975	88567	18^{h} 05^{m} 01.22^{s}	−29° 34′ 48.3″	4.66	−4.36	2076	G0Ib/II	Dhanusaragra, Nash; W Sgr; Cepheid variable
HD 167818			51		167818	89678	18^{h} 18^{m} 03.19^{s}	−27° 02′ 33.5″	4.66	−2.00	700	K3III	
ω Sgr	ω	58	248		188376	98066	19^{h} 55^{m} 50.23^{s}	−26° 17′ 58.9″	4.70	2.82	78	G3/G5III	part of the Terebellum; also named "Terebellum"
4 Sgr		4	15		163955	88116	17^{h} 59^{m} 47.56^{s}	−23° 48′ 57.6″	4.74	−0.89	436	B9V	Tianyue
HD 189831			268		189831	98761	20^{h} 03^{m} 33.41^{s}	−37° 56′ 25.8″	4.77	−0.70	405	K4III	
21 Sgr		21	65		169420	90289	18^{h} 25^{m} 21.04^{s}	−20° 32′ 29.8″	4.81	−1.50	597	A1/A2V	
60 Sgr	A	60	255		189005	98353	19^{h} 58^{m} 57.18^{s}	−26° 11′ 45.0″	4.84	−0.25	340	G8II/III	part of the Terebellum
HD 172910			91		172910	91918	18^{h} 44^{m} 19.36^{s}	−35° 38′ 30.9″	4.86	−0.84	451	B2V	Nóngzhàngrén (農丈人)
ν^{1} Sgr	ν^{1}	32	111		174974	92761	18^{h} 54^{m} 10.18^{s}	−22° 44′ 41.4″	4.86	−3.91	1852	K1II	Ainalrami, Ain al Rami
ψ Sgr	ψ	42	155		179950	94643	19^{h} 15^{m} 32.40^{s}	−25° 15′ 23.8″	4.86	−0.16	330	K0/K1III+..	
56 Sgr	f	56	229		186648	97290	19^{h} 46^{m} 21.82^{s}	−19° 45′ 39.2″	4.87	0.88	205	K0III	
43 Sgr	d	43	160		180540	94820	19^{h} 17^{m} 38.09^{s}	−18° 57′ 10.4″	4.88	−1.20	535	K0III	
1 Sgr		11	40		166464	89153	18^{h} 11^{m} 43.33^{s}	−23° 42′ 04.2″	4.96	0.59	244	K0III	
HD 190056			270		190056	98842	20^{h} 04^{m} 19.56^{s}	−32° 03′ 22.6″	4.99	0.00	324	K1III/IV	
14 G. Sgr			14		163755	88060	17^{h} 59^{m} 05.28^{s}	−30° 15′ 10.8″	5.00	−2.29	934	K5/M0III	
ν^{2} Sgr	ν^{2}	35	113		175190	92845	18^{h} 55^{m} 07.07^{s}	−22° 40′ 16.5″	5.00	0.41	270	K1Ib/II	Pabilsang, Ain al Rami
61 Sgr	g	61	253		188899	98258	19^{h} 57^{m} 57.02^{s}	−15° 29′ 28.5″	5.01	0.25	292	A2V	
ξ^{1} Sgr	ξ^{1}	36	119		175687	93057	18^{h} 57^{m} 20.48^{s}	−20° 39′ 22.8″	5.02	−5.92	5015	B9.5Ib	
χ^{1} Sgr	χ^{1}	47	181		182369	95477	19^{h} 25^{m} 16.45^{s}	−24° 30′ 30.4″	5.02	0.87	221	A4IV/V	Namalsadirah III
55 Sgr	e^{2}	55	225		186005	96950	19^{h} 42^{m} 31.09^{s}	−16° 07′ 26.3″	5.06	1.42	175	F3IV/V	On 12 January 2006 it was occulted by Venus, but Venus was not visible.
76 G. Sgr			76		170680	90806	18^{h} 31^{m} 26.30^{s}	−18° 24′ 09.5″	5.12	1.04	213	B9/B9.5V	
29 Sgr		29	104		174116	92390	18^{h} 49^{m} 40.11^{s}	−20° 19′ 29.1″	5.22	−1.59	749	K2III	
77 G. Sgr			77		171034	91014	18^{h} 33^{m} 57.76^{s}	−33° 00′ 59.5″	5.28	−3.90	2233	B2III/IV	Alwasl
15 Sgr		15	43		167264	89439	18^{h} 15^{m} 12.91^{s}	−20° 43′ 41.8″	5.29			B0/1Ia/ab	
54 Sgr	e^{1}	54	221		185644	96808	19^{h} 40^{m} 43.34^{s}	−16° 17′ 35.3″	5.30	0.92	245	K1III	
θ^{2} Sgr	θ^{2}		256		189118	98421	19^{h} 59^{m} 51.28^{s}	−34° 41′ 51.5″	5.30	1.89	157	A4/A5IV	
V3961 Sgr			235	V3961	187474	97749	19^{h} 51^{m} 50.59^{s}	−39° 52′ 27.6″	5.32	0.24	339	A0p	α² CVn variable
HR 7703			279		191408	99461	20^{h} 11^{m} 11.61^{s}	−36° 05′ 50.6″	5.32	6.41	20	K2V	nearby binary star
V4050 Sgr			59	V4050	168733	90074	18^{h} 22^{m} 53.08^{s}	−36° 40′ 10.2″	5.33	−1.06	619	B7Ib/II	α² CVn variable
7 Sgr		7	20		164584	88380	18^{h} 02^{m} 51.10^{s}	−24° 16′ 56.7″	5.37	−2.28	1105	F2/F3II/III	
75 G. Sgr			75		170479	90763	18^{h} 31^{m} 04.85^{s}	−32° 59′ 20.4″	5.37	0.22	350	A5V	
28 Sgr		28	99		173460	92111	18^{h} 46^{m} 20.59^{s}	−22° 23′ 31.9″	5.37	−2.60	1278	K5III	
χ^{3} Sgr	χ^{3}	49	182		182416	95503	19^{h} 25^{m} 29.67^{s}	−23° 57′ 44.7″	5.45	−0.50	505	K3III	
193 G. Sgr			193		183275	95865	19^{h} 29^{m} 52.17^{s}	−26° 59′ 07.8″	5.46	1.00	254	K1/K2III	
212 G. Sgr			212		184985	96536	19^{h} 37^{m} 34.48^{s}	−14° 18′ 05.2″	5.46	3.01	101	F7V	
14 Sgr		14	42		167036	89369	18^{h} 14^{m} 15.91^{s}	−21° 42′ 47.2″	5.49	−0.46	505	K2III	
24 Sgr		24	78		171115	91004	18^{h} 33^{m} 53.49^{s}	−24° 01′ 56.2″	5.49	−4.62	3432	K3III	
134 G. Sgr			134		177074	93667	19^{h} 04^{m} 25.06^{s}	−31° 02′ 49.3″	5.49	−0.63	546	A0V	
226 G. Sgr			226		186185	97063	19^{h} 43^{m} 33.45^{s}	−15° 28′ 10.8″	5.49	2.67	120	F5V	
126 G. Sgr			126		176162	93225	18^{h} 59^{m} 23.80^{s}	−12° 50′ 25.7″	5.51	−0.48	514	B4V	
153 G. Sgr			153		179497	94437	19^{h} 13^{m} 15.52^{s}	−12° 16′ 57.0″	5.51	−0.68	565	K3III	
228 G. Sgr			228		186500	97260	19^{h} 46^{m} 01.22^{s}	−31° 54′ 30.7″	5.51	−0.61	545	B8III	
32 G. Sgr			32		165687	88816	18^{h} 07^{m} 48.40^{s}	−17° 09′ 15.5″	5.52	1.10	249	K0III	
60 G. Sgr			60		168838	90124	18^{h} 23^{m} 28.82^{s}	−36° 14′ 16.8″	5.52	0.57	319	K0III	
37 G. Sgr			37		166023	89020	18^{h} 10^{m} 05.81^{s}	−30° 43′ 43.0″	5.53	0.31	360	K1III + (F)	
114 G. Sgr			114		175317	92882	18^{h} 55^{m} 31.02^{s}	−16° 22′ 34.3″	5.56	3.03	104	F5/F6IV/V	
V4024 Sgr			144	V4024	178175	93996	19^{h} 08^{m} 16.70^{s}	−19° 17′ 25.0″	5.56	−2.80	1531	B2V	γ Cas variable; Be star
50 Sgr		50	185		182629	95564	19^{h} 26^{m} 19.13^{s}	−21° 46′ 36.1″	5.57	−0.59	556	K1/K2III	
18 Sgr		18	63		169233	90260	18^{h} 25^{m} 01.51^{s}	−30° 45′ 23.0″	5.58	−0.93	653	K0III	
162 G. Sgr			162		180885	94986	19^{h} 19^{m} 39.99^{s}	−35° 25′ 17.1″	5.59	−3.17	1842	B4III	
165 G. Sgr			165		181240	95077	19^{h} 20^{m} 38.16^{s}	−22° 24′ 09.4″	5.59	1.81	186	A6:m...	
κ^{1} Sgr	κ^{1}		292		193571	100469	20^{h} 22^{m} 27.48^{s}	−42° 02′ 57.7″	5.60	1.23	244	A0V	
74 G. Sgr			74		170433	90687	18^{h} 30^{m} 11.84^{s}	−18° 43′ 42.9″	5.63	0.86	293	K0III	
131 G. Sgr			131		176704	93498	19^{h} 02^{m} 27.69^{s}	−24° 50′ 47.0″	5.63	0.99	276	K2III	
51 Sgr	h^{1}	51	204	V5548	184552	96406	19^{h} 36^{m} 01.65^{s}	−24° 43′ 08.5″	5.64	0.89	290	A1m...	V5548 Sgr; δ Sct variable
κ^{2} Sgr	κ^{2}		294		193807	100591	20^{h} 23^{m} 53.19^{s}	−42° 25′ 22.5″	5.64	0.36	370	A3V	
262 G. Sgr			262		189245	98470	20^{h} 00^{m} 20.16^{s}	−33° 42′ 09.9″	5.65	4.05	68	F7V	
186 G. Sgr			186		182681	95619	19^{h} 26^{m} 56.47^{s}	−29° 44′ 35.2″	5.66	1.46	225	B8/B9V	
209 G. Sgr			209		184835	96496	19^{h} 37^{m} 03.33^{s}	−18° 13′ 51.7″	5.66	0.00	442	K0III	
33 Sgr		33	110		174947	92747	18^{h} 54^{m} 00.09^{s}	−21° 21′ 35.3″	5.68	−2.95	1734	G8/K0II	
63 Sgr		63	266		189741	98633	20^{h} 01^{m} 58.58^{s}	−13° 38′ 14.1″	5.69	0.80	309	A1IV	
189 G. Sgr			189		183007	95823	19^{h} 29^{m} 23.77^{s}	−43° 26′ 41.7″	5.70	1.91	187	Am	
187 G. Sgr			187		182645	95557	19^{h} 26^{m} 11.03^{s}	−15° 03′ 11.7″	5.71	−1.40	862	B7IV	
21 G. Sgr			21		164402	88298	18^{h} 01^{m} 54.38^{s}	−22° 46′ 49.0″	5.72			B0Iab...	
184 G. Sgr			184		182477	95485	19^{h} 25^{m} 21.56^{s}	−13° 53′ 50.2″	5.72	−1.01	723	K2III	
12 G. Sgr	(ο)		12		163652	88038	17^{h} 58^{m} 55.68^{s}	−36° 51′ 30.3″	5.74	0.49	365	G8III	
10 G. Sgr			10		163318	87836	17^{h} 56^{m} 41.82^{s}	−28° 03′ 55.3″	5.76	2.25	164	A7III/IV	
Y Sgr			57	Y	168608	89968	18^{h} 21^{m} 22.99^{s}	−18° 51′ 35.9″	5.76	−2.23	1294	F8II	
84 G. Sgr			84		171961	91405	18^{h} 38^{m} 30.72^{s}	−23° 30′ 17.4″	5.78	0.01	465	B8III	
152 G. Sgr			152		179323	94434	19^{h} 13^{m} 13.67^{s}	−25° 54′ 24.3″	5.79	−3.27	2117	K2III	
259 G. Sgr			259		189198	98512	20^{h} 00^{m} 48.32^{s}	−45° 06′ 46.6″	5.80	0.59	359	A8III	
50 G. Sgr			50		167720	89609	18^{h} 17^{m} 11.63^{s}	−17° 22′ 25.9″	5.81	−1.72	1045	K2III	
94 G. Sgr			94		173117	91974	18^{h} 44^{m} 49.60^{s}	−25° 00′ 39.1″	5.82	−1.11	793	B8III	
ρ^{2} Sgr	ρ^{2}	45	175		181645	95188	19^{h} 21^{m} 50.83^{s}	−18° 18′ 29.4″	5.84	0.63	359	K0III	
HD 172051			86		172051	91438	18^{h} 38^{m} 53.45^{s}	−21° 03′ 05.4″	5.85	5.28	42	G5V	
296 G. Sgr			296		194215	100738	20^{h} 25^{m} 26.82^{s}	−28° 39′ 47.8″	5.86	−0.24	541	G8II/III	
57 Sgr		57	238		187739	97783	19^{h} 52^{m} 12.01^{s}	−19° 02′ 41.5″	5.88	0.98	312	K0III	
9 Sgr		9	24		164794	88469	18^{h} 03^{m} 52.44^{s}	−24° 21′ 38.6″	5.89	−5.01	4939	O3.5V((f+))+ O5–5.5V((f))	
V4089 Sgr			201	V4089	184035	96234	19^{h} 34^{m} 08.48^{s}	−40° 02′ 04.7″	5.89	0.26	435	A5IV-III	Algol variable
HD 169830			66		169830	90485	18^{h} 27^{m} 49.48^{s}	−29° 49′ 00.8″	5.90	3.10	118	F8V	has two planets (b & c)
116 G. Sgr			116		175360	92931	18^{h} 56^{m} 00.67^{s}	−23° 10′ 25.4″	5.91	−1.27	891	B6III	
180 G. Sgr			180		182286	95456	19^{h} 25^{m} 04.05^{s}	−29° 18′ 33.2″	5.91	1.32	270	K3III	
83 G. Sgr			83		171856	91347	18^{h} 37^{m} 54.43^{s}	−21° 23′ 51.2″	5.93	1.01	314	A5IV	
138 G. Sgr			138		177517	93763	19^{h} 05^{m} 41.18^{s}	−15° 39′ 37.4″	5.93	−1.20	869	B8IIIsp...	
29 G. Sgr			29		165185	88694	18^{h} 06^{m} 23.64^{s}	−36° 01′ 11.3″	5.94	4.74	57	G3V	
260 G. Sgr			260		189195	98461	20^{h} 00^{m} 15.92^{s}	−37° 42′ 06.2″	5.95	1.02	316	G8/K0III	
16 Sgr		16	44		167263	89440	18^{h} 15^{m} 12.97^{s}	−20° 23′ 16.7″	5.96			B0.5Ib/II	
132 G. Sgr			132		176884	93537	19^{h} 03^{m} 03.80^{s}	−19° 14′ 44.4″	5.96	−2.33	1482	K0II/III	
218 G. Sgr			218		185467	96760	19^{h} 40^{m} 07.15^{s}	−23° 25′ 44.6″	5.97	0.45	415	K0III	
25 G. Sgr			25		164870	88550	18^{h} 04^{m} 50.39^{s}	−35° 54′ 04.9″	5.98	0.79	355	K2III	
13 G. Sgr			13		163685	88012	17^{h} 58^{m} 39.05^{s}	−28° 45′ 32.7″	5.99	−2.06	1331	B3II/III	
141 G. Sgr			141		177817	93855	19^{h} 06^{m} 52.12^{s}	−16° 13′ 45.2″	6.00	−1.19	893	B7V	
264 G. Sgr			264		189561	98575	20^{h} 01^{m} 23.84^{s}	−22° 44′ 14.2″	6.01	1.10	313	K0III	
RS Sgr			47	RS	167647	89637	18^{h} 17^{m} 36.25^{s}	−34° 06′ 26.0″	6.03	−1.13	881	B3/B4IV/V	47 G. Sgr
179 G. Sgr			179		182180	95408	19^{h} 24^{m} 30.17^{s}	−27° 51′ 57.3″	6.03	−2.00	1315	B2Vnn	
233 G. Sgr			233		187098	97515	19^{h} 49^{m} 11.53^{s}	−28° 47′ 19.4″	6.04	2.75	149	F3V	
V4387 Sgr			45	V4387	167356	89470	18^{h} 15^{m} 30.76^{s}	−18° 39′ 41.7″	6.05	−4.35	3928	Ap Si	α² CVn variable
140 G. Sgr			140		177846	93925	19^{h} 07^{m} 30.84^{s}	−28° 38′ 12.4″	6.05	−1.19	916	K3III	
295 G. Sgr			295		194184	100764	20^{h} 25^{m} 48.01^{s}	−40° 47′ 45.5″	6.08	0.91	352	K3III	
121 G. Sgr			121		175794	93134	18^{h} 58^{m} 21.31^{s}	−31° 02′ 09.1″	6.09	0.46	436	K3III	
163 G. Sgr			163		180928	94929	19^{h} 19^{m} 00.15^{s}	−15° 32′ 09.2″	6.09	0.09	517	K4III	
148 G. Sgr			148		178555	94144	19^{h} 09^{m} 48.13^{s}	−19° 48′ 12.4″	6.11	0.71	392	K1III	
197 G. Sgr			197		183545	95965	19^{h} 30^{m} 54.04^{s}	−21° 18′ 43.9″	6.11	−1.78	1235	A2V	
232 G. Sgr			232		186984	97423	19^{h} 48^{m} 03.01^{s}	−13° 42′ 12.8″	6.11	2.13	204	A6:IIIm...	
258 G. Sgr			258		189140	98485	20^{h} 00^{m} 26.47^{s}	−43° 02′ 36.0″	6.11	−1.53	1101	M0III	
108 G. Sgr			108		174631	92643	18^{h} 52^{m} 37.05^{s}	−29° 22′ 46.4″	6.12	0.22	493	K1III	
38 G. Sgr			38		166197	89086	18^{h} 10^{m} 55.35^{s}	−33° 48′ 00.2″	6.13			B2II/III	
178 G. Sgr			178		181925	95396	19^{h} 24^{m} 21.45^{s}	−43° 43′ 19.4″	6.13	−0.12	579	M1/M2III	
V4333 Sgr			208	V4333	184705	96440	19^{h} 36^{m} 26.06^{s}	−18° 51′ 10.4″	6.13	1.80	240	F0V	δ Sct variable
62 G. Sgr			62		169236	90290	18^{h} 25^{m} 21.70^{s}	−35° 59′ 31.3″	6.14	0.39	461	K0III	
123 G. Sgr			123		175892	93140	18^{h} 58^{m} 24.83^{s}	−22° 31′ 46.3″	6.14	1.67	255	A1V	
224 G. Sgr			224		186042	97067	19^{h} 43^{m} 37.62^{s}	−37° 32′ 19.4″	6.14	−0.95	853	B8IV/V	
58 G. Sgr			58		168646	90012	18^{h} 22^{m} 00.13^{s}	−28° 25′ 47.8″	6.15	0.33	475	A3III	
3 G. Sgr			3		161664	87099	17^{h} 47^{m} 45.60^{s}	−22° 28′ 40.0″	6.18	−2.54	1811	G3/G5Ib	
63 Oph		(63)	8		162978	87706	17^{h} 54^{m} 54.04^{s}	−24° 53′ 13.5″	6.18			O7/O8III	
49 G. Sgr			49		167666	89622	18^{h} 17^{m} 24.08^{s}	−28° 39′ 07.3″	6.18	0.75	397	A5V	
70 Sgr			56	V4028	168574	89980	18^{h} 21^{m} 31.36^{s}	−24° 54′ 55.0″	6.19	−1.57	1164	M3III	V4028 Sgr
71 G. Sgr			71		169990	90494	18^{h} 27^{m} 56.48^{s}	−17° 48′ 01.3″	6.19	−0.01	567	B8III/IV	
280 G. Sgr			280		191584	99570	20^{h} 12^{m} 23.86^{s}	−42° 46′ 47.3″	6.20	1.08	344	K2III	
16 G. Sgr			16		164028	88125	18^{h} 00^{m} 00.08^{s}	−20° 20′ 22.2″	6.22	−0.88	858	K0III	
HD 165516			30		165516	88760	18^{h} 07^{m} 11.35^{s}	−21° 26′ 38.2″	6.22	−4.35	4234	O+...	
26 Sgr		26	88		172546	91689	18^{h} 41^{m} 51.61^{s}	−23° 50′ 00.1″	6.22	2.20	208	A3m...	
V4200 Sgr			242	V4200	188088	97944	19^{h} 54^{m} 17.82^{s}	−23° 56′ 24.3″	6.22	5.46	46	K3/K4V	BY Draconis variable
297 G. Sgr			297		194433	100852	20^{h} 26^{m} 53.14^{s}	−37° 24′ 09.5″	6.24	3.25	129	K1IV	
128 G. Sgr			128		176537	93423	19^{h} 01^{m} 37.74^{s}	−22° 41′ 43.3″	6.25	−2.10	1523	K3III	
V5652 Sgr			157	V5652	179949	94645	19^{h} 15^{m} 33.15^{s}	−24° 10′ 44.8″	6.25	4.09	88	F8V	Gumala; has a planet (b)
V4199 Sgr			173	V4199	181558	95159	19^{h} 21^{m} 37.11^{s}	−19° 14′ 03.9″	6.25	−0.34	679	B5III	
6 Sgr		6	18		164358	88258	18^{h} 01^{m} 23.12^{s}	−17° 09′ 24.7″	6.27	−2.50	1852	K2III	
206 G. Sgr			206		184574	96365	19^{h} 35^{m} 33.46^{s}	−12° 15′ 11.0″	6.27	1.14	346	K0III	
254 G. Sgr			254		188981	98351	19^{h} 58^{m} 56.37^{s}	−30° 32′ 17.7″	6.27	2.18	214	K1III	
69 G. Sgr			69		169938	90510	18^{h} 28^{m} 06.17^{s}	−26° 45′ 25.8″	6.28	1.69	269	A3/A4V	
109 G. Sgr			109		174630	92635	18^{h} 52^{m} 28.32^{s}	−26° 39′ 02.2″	6.28	0.91	386	G8/K0III	
V4198 Sgr			142		177863	93887	19^{h} 07^{m} 08.33^{s}	−18° 44′ 17.3″	6.28	−0.45	724	B8V	
150 G. Sgr			150		178840	94272	19^{h} 11^{m} 18.80^{s}	−29° 30′ 08.1″	6.28	0.34	502	B8/B9V	
30 Sgr		30	105		174309	92480	18^{h} 50^{m} 50.50^{s}	−22° 09′ 43.6″	6.61	1.91	245	F2IV	
17 G. Sgr			17		164245	88294	18^{h} 01^{m} 48.30^{s}	−36° 22′ 40.1″	6.30	−0.42	721	B7/B8II/III	
64 G. Sgr			64		169398	90336	18^{h} 25^{m} 54.61^{s}	−33° 56′ 44.5″	6.30	−1.05	962	B7III	
143 G. Sgr			143		178075	93993	19^{h} 08^{m} 14.56^{s}	−24° 39′ 26.5″	6.30	−0.27	672	B9.5V	
282 G. Sgr			282		192433	99878	20^{h} 15^{m} 50.59^{s}	−30° 00′ 19.1″	6.30	−1.43	1148	K4III	
V4434 Sgr			283	V4434	192472	99920	20^{h} 16^{m} 23.61^{s}	−36° 27′ 12.7″	6.30	−0.78	851	M4III	
V3894 Sgr			4	V3894	161756	87163	17^{h} 48^{m} 27.84^{s}	−26° 58′ 29.8″	6.31	−1.40	1136	B3Vn	
68 G. Sgr			68		169851	90478	18^{h} 27^{m} 43.76^{s}	−26° 38′ 05.1″	6.31	1.87	252	A7V	
90 G. Sgr			90		172875	91901	18^{h} 44^{m} 07.93^{s}	−36° 43′ 05.6″	6.31	1.11	357	K0III	
129 G. Sgr			129		176593	93418	19^{h} 01^{m} 33.52^{s}	−15° 16′ 57.4″	6.31	0.14	559	K0III	
263 G. Sgr			263		189388	98579	20^{h} 01^{m} 26.76^{s}	−40° 48′ 51.3″	6.31	1.64	280	A2/A3V	
V3879 Sgr			89	V3879	172816	91781	18^{h} 42^{m} 55.11^{s}	−19° 17′ 02.9″	6.32	−1.55	1221	M4III	
39 G. Sgr			39		166393	89114	18^{h} 11^{m} 14.79^{s}	−19° 50′ 30.8″	6.33	1.09	365	A2V	
167 G. Sgr			167		181401	95211	19^{h} 22^{m} 09.57^{s}	−42° 00′ 57.4″	6.33	1.36	321	K1III	
53 Sgr		53	217		185404	96729	19^{h} 39^{m} 49.46^{s}	−23° 25′ 39.4″	6.33	0.85	406	A0V	
V4405 Sgr			98	V4405	173425	92079	18^{h} 46^{m} 01.15^{s}	−19° 36′ 22.9″	6.34	−0.43	738	M2/M3III	
96 G. Sgr			96		173282	92016	18^{h} 45^{m} 18.64^{s}	−21° 00′ 05.6″	6.35	2.58	185	F5/F6V	
127 G. Sgr			127		176246	93315	19^{h} 00^{m} 24.78^{s}	−24° 56′ 32.2″	6.35	−0.62	809	K0III	
48 G. Sgr			48		167665	89620	18^{h} 17^{m} 23.66^{s}	−28° 17′ 19.0″	6.36	4.00	97	F8V	
80 G. Sgr			80		171416	91172	18^{h} 35^{m} 59.64^{s}	−29° 41′ 56.7″	6.36	−1.20	1058	K1III	
125 G. Sgr			125		176123	93234	18^{h} 59^{m} 26.78^{s}	−18° 33′ 59.0″	6.37	−0.66	830	G5/G6II	
133 G. Sgr			133		176903	93543	19^{h} 03^{m} 06.99^{s}	−19° 06′ 10.9″	6.37	1.82	265	F5V	
36 G. Sgr			36		165978	89010	18^{h} 09^{m} 59.96^{s}	−32° 43′ 09.4″	6.39	1.15	365	K0III	
151 G. Sgr			151		179201	94372	19^{h} 12^{m} 28.02^{s}	−21° 39′ 30.0″	6.39	0.66	457	K0III	
34 G. Sgr			34		165784	88876	18^{h} 08^{m} 38.59^{s}	−21° 26′ 58.4″	6.42	−3.41	3019	A2/A3Iab	
269 G. Sgr			269		190009	98785	20^{h} 03^{m} 44.33^{s}	−22° 35′ 44.3″	6.44	2.64	188	F7V	
115 G. Sgr			115		175390	92972	18^{h} 56^{m} 27.23^{s}	−31° 41′ 20.4″	6.45	−0.30	731	K2III	
103 G. Sgr			103		173928	92301	18^{h} 48^{m} 45.41^{s}	−18° 36′ 04.2″	6.46	−0.48	795	A1V + K1III	
290 G. Sgr			290		193302	100332	20^{h} 20^{m} 51.87^{s}	−35° 40′ 25.4″	6.46	0.79	444	K3III	
234 G. Sgr			234		187150	97484	19^{h} 48^{m} 50.17^{s}	−12° 19′ 09.7″	6.47	−2.04	1638	K5III	
V505 Sgr			240	V505	187949	97849	19^{h} 53^{m} 06.39^{s}	−14° 36′ 11.1″	6.47	1.14	380	A1V	
244 G. Sgr			244		188158	98012	19^{h} 55^{m} 05.11^{s}	−33° 02′ 46.5″	6.47	−1.46	1259	K2/K3III	
9 G. Sgr			9		163245	87782	17^{h} 55^{m} 54.96^{s}	−18° 48′ 07.6″	6.48	1.25	363	A1V	
166 G. Sgr			166		181321	95149	19^{h} 21^{m} 29.70^{s}	−34° 58′ 59.6″	6.48	4.88	68	G1/G2V	
196 G. Sgr			196		183577	96095	19^{h} 32^{m} 14.11^{s}	−44° 32′ 47.3″	6.48	3.37	137	F6V	
V4190 Sgr			79	V4190	171369	91132	18^{h} 35^{m} 21.31^{s}	−20° 50′ 25.6″	6.49	1.64	304	F0IV/V	δ Sct variable
25 Sgr		25			171237	91066	18^{h} 34^{m} 32.76^{s}	−24° 13′ 20.6″	6.53	−3.45	3228	F2II	
65 Sgr		65	274		190454	98953	20^{h} 05^{m} 26.33^{s}	−12° 39′ 54.2″	6.53	1.07	402	A0V	
RY Sgr			156	RY	180093	94730	19^{h} 16^{m} 32.76^{s}	−33° 31′ 20.3″	6.58	−5.64	9056	Cp	156 G. Sgr
HD 163296					163296	87819	17^{h} 56^{m} 21.29^{s}	−21° 57′ 21.87″	6.85		329	A3VaekA1mA1	protoplanetary disk
17 Sgr		17			167570	89567	18^{h} 16^{m} 35.37^{s}	−20° 32′ 40.1″	6.89	0.55	605	A7:	
HD 187085					187085	97546	19^{h} 49^{m} 33.97^{s}	−37° 46′ 50.0″	7.22	3.95	147	G0V	has a planet (b)
χ^{2} Sgr	χ^{2}	48			182391	95486	19^{h} 25^{m} 22.34^{s}	−24° 24′ 43.5″	7.27	−0.53	1185	B7IV	Namalsadirah IV
HD 181342					181342	95124	19^{h} 21^{m} 04.23^{s}	−23° 37′ 10.5″	7.55	2.24	377	K0III	has a planet (b)
HD 180902					180902	94951	19^{h} 19^{m} 17.71^{s}	−23° 33′ 29.359″	7.78	2.48	374	K0III/IV	has a planet (b)
HD 190647					190647	99115	20^{h} 07^{m} 19.67^{s}	−35° 32′ 19.1″	7.78	4.11	177	G5V	has a planet (b)
HD 181720					181720	95262	19^{h} 22^{m} 52.99^{s}	−32° 55′ 08.6″	7.86	4.12	182	G1V	has a planet (b)
HD 169142					169142		18^{h} 24^{m} 29.8^{s}	−29° 46′ 50″	8.16		473	A7V	has a planet (b)
HD 171238					171238	91085	18^{h} 34^{m} 43.67^{s}	−28° 04′ 20.3″	8.66	5.44	144	K0V	has a planet (b)
HD 165155					165155	88650	18^{h} 05^{m} 57.0^{s}	−29° 55′ 02″	9.36		212	G8V	has a planet (b)
HD 164604					164604	88414	18^{h} 03^{m} 06.93^{s}	−28° 33′ 38.3″	10.04	7.14	124	K2V	has a planet (b)
Ross 154						92403	18^{h} 49^{m} 49.36^{s}	−23° 50′ 10.4″	10.44	13.08	9.68	M3.5V	V1216 Sgr; 9th nearest star; flare star
WASP-123							19^{h} 17^{m} 55.0^{s}	−32° 51′ 36″	11.1			G5	has a transiting planet (b)
Sakurai's Object				V4334			17^{h} 52^{m} 32.7^{s}	−17° 41′ 08″	11.6			F2Ia C~	
WASP-110							20^{h} 23^{m} 30.0^{s}	−44° 03′ 30″	12.3		1044	G9	has a transiting planet (b)
WASP-67							19^{h} 42^{m} 59.0^{s}	−19° 56′ 58″	12.5		734	K0V	has a transiting planet (b)
OGLE-TR-10				V5125			17^{h} 51^{m} 28.25^{s}	−29° 52′ 34.9″	14.93		5000	G or K	has a transiting planet (b)
OGLE-TR-56				V5157			17^{h} 56^{m} 35.31^{s}	−29° 32′ 21.2″	16.56		5000	G	has a transiting planet (b)
SWEEPS; J175853.92−291120.6							17^{h} 58^{m} 53.92^{s}	−29° 11′ 20.6″	18.80		~6500	F5V	has a planet SWEEPS-04
OGLE-2005-BLG-169L							18^{h} 06^{m} 05^{s}	−30° 43′ 57″	19.4		8800	M?	has a planet (b)
OGLE-2003-BLG-235							18^{h} 05^{m} 16^{s}	−28° 53′ 42″	19.7		17000	K	has a planet (b)
SWEEPS; J175902.67−291153.5							17^{h} 59^{m} 02.67^{s}	−29° 11′ 53.5″	19.83		~6500		has a planet (SWEEPS-11)
MOA-2007-BLG-400L							18^{h} 09^{m} 42^{s}	−29° 13′ 27″	22		20000	M3V?	has a planet (b)
SWEEPS; J175902.00-291323.7							17^{h} 59^{m} 02.00^{s}	−29° 13′ 23.7″	26.23		~6500		has a possible shortest period planet (SWEEPS-10)
MOA-2007-BLG-192L							18^{h} 08^{m} 04^{s}	−27° 09′ 00″			7040	M	has a planet (b)
Pistol Star				V4647			17^{h} 46^{m} 15.3^{s}	−28° 50′ 04″	>28		25000	LBV	hypergiant; member of the Quintuplet star cluster
V6392 Sgr				V6392			18^{h} 21^{m} 59.36^{s}	−28° 23′ 25.1″			18,700		Mira Variable
V4998 Sgr				V4998			17^{h} 46^{m} 05.62^{s}	28° 51′ 31″			26000	LBV	luminous blue variable; member of the Quintuplet star cluster
LBV 1806-20							18^{h} 08^{m} 40.31^{s}	−20° 24′ 41.1″	n/a	n/a	28,375.6	(LBV) O9-B2	luminous blue variable; member of the 1806-20 cluster
WR 102ea							17^{h} 46^{m} 15.12^{s}	−28° 49′ 36.9″	8.8	n/a	26,000	WN9h	Wolf–Rayet star; member of the Quintuplet star cluster
S2							17^{h} 45^{m} 40.0442^{s}	−29° 00′ 27.975″	n/a	n/a	25,896.8	B0-2V	orbits the supermassive black hole Sgr A*
KW Sgr				KW	316496	87433	17^{h} 52^{m} 00.72695^{s}	−28° 01′ 20.5557″	11.0	-7.7	7,890	M1.5 Iab	hypergiant; one of the largest known stars. B magnitude = 11.
Table legend: Name = Proper name; B = Bayer designation; F or/and G. = Flamsteed designation or Gould designation; Var = Variable-star designation; HD = Henry Draper Catalogue designation number; HIP = Hipparcos Catalogue designation number; RA = Right ascension for the Epoch/Equinox J2000.0; Dec = Declination for the Epoch/Equinox J2000.0; vis. mag. = visual magnitude (m or m_{v}), also known as apparent magnitude; abs. mag. = absolute magnitude (M_{v}); Dist. (ly) = Distance in light-years from Earth; Sp. class = Spectral class of the star in the stellar classification system; Notes = Common name(s) or alternate name(s); comments; notable properties [for example: multiple star status, range of variability if it is a variable star, exoplanets, etc.]

== See also ==
- List of stars by constellation
