= Sagittarius in Chinese astronomy =

The modern constellation Sagittarius lies across two of the quadrants, symbolized by the Azure Dragon of the East (東方青龍, Dōng Fāng Qīng Lóng) and Black Tortoise of the North (北方玄武, Běi Fāng Xuán Wǔ), that divide the sky in traditional Chinese uranography.

The name of the western constellation in modern Chinese is 人馬座 (rén mǎ zuò), which means "the horse-man constellation".

== Stars ==
The map of Chinese constellation in constellation Sagittarius area consists of :

Four Symbols	Mansion (Chinese name)	Romanization	Translation	Asterisms (Chinese name)	Romanization	Translation	Western star name	Proper Name	Chinese star name	Romanization	Translation
Azure Dragon of the East (東方青龍)
Azure Dragon of the East (東方青龍)	箕	Jī	Winnowing Basket	箕	Jī	Winnowing Basket					
Azure Dragon of the East (東方青龍)	箕	Jī	Winnowing Basket	箕	Jī	Winnowing Basket	γ Sgr	Dhanusaragra (for γ¹ Sgr), Alnasl (for γ² Sgr)			
Azure Dragon of the East (東方青龍)	箕	Jī	Winnowing Basket	箕	Jī	Winnowing Basket	γ Sgr	Dhanusaragra (for γ¹ Sgr), Alnasl (for γ² Sgr)	箕宿一	Jīsùyī	1st star
Azure Dragon of the East (東方青龍)	箕	Jī	Winnowing Basket	箕	Jī	Winnowing Basket	γ Sgr	Dhanusaragra (for γ¹ Sgr), Alnasl (for γ² Sgr)	箕宿距星	Jīsùjùxīng	Separated star
Azure Dragon of the East (東方青龍)	箕	Jī	Winnowing Basket	箕	Jī	Winnowing Basket	γ Sgr	Dhanusaragra (for γ¹ Sgr), Alnasl (for γ² Sgr)	箕宿西北星	Jīsùxīběixīng	Northwestern star
Azure Dragon of the East (東方青龍)	箕	Jī	Winnowing Basket	箕	Jī	Winnowing Basket	δ Sgr	Kaus Media			
Azure Dragon of the East (東方青龍)	箕	Jī	Winnowing Basket	箕	Jī	Winnowing Basket	δ Sgr	Kaus Media	箕宿二	Jīsùèr	2nd star
Azure Dragon of the East (東方青龍)	箕	Jī	Winnowing Basket	箕	Jī	Winnowing Basket	δ Sgr	Kaus Media	箕宿东北星	Jīsùdōngběixīng	Northeastern star
Azure Dragon of the East (東方青龍)	箕	Jī	Winnowing Basket	箕	Jī	Winnowing Basket	ε Sgr	Kaus Australis			
Azure Dragon of the East (東方青龍)	箕	Jī	Winnowing Basket	箕	Jī	Winnowing Basket	ε Sgr	Kaus Australis	箕宿三	Jīsùsān	3rd star
Azure Dragon of the East (東方青龍)	箕	Jī	Winnowing Basket	箕	Jī	Winnowing Basket	ε Sgr	Kaus Australis	箕宿东南星	Jīsùdōngnánxīng	Southeastern star
Azure Dragon of the East (東方青龍)	箕	Jī	Winnowing Basket	箕	Jī	Winnowing Basket	η Sgr	Heryibwia	箕宿四	Jīsùsì	4th star
Black Tortoise of the North (北方玄武)	箕	Jī	Winnowing Basket	箕	Jī	Winnowing Basket					
Black Tortoise of the North (北方玄武)	斗	Dǒu	Dipper	斗	Dǒu	Dipper					
Black Tortoise of the North (北方玄武)	斗	Dǒu	Dipper	斗	Dǒu	Dipper	φ Sgr	Nandou			
Black Tortoise of the North (北方玄武)	斗	Dǒu	Dipper	斗	Dǒu	Dipper	φ Sgr	Nandou	斗宿一	Dǒusùyī	1st star
Black Tortoise of the North (北方玄武)	斗	Dǒu	Dipper	斗	Dǒu	Dipper	φ Sgr	Nandou	斗宿距星	Dǒusùjùxīng	Separated star
Black Tortoise of the North (北方玄武)	斗	Dǒu	Dipper	斗	Dǒu	Dipper	φ Sgr	Nandou	斗宿魁第一星	Dǒusùkuídìyīxīng	1st chief star
Black Tortoise of the North (北方玄武)	斗	Dǒu	Dipper	斗	Dǒu	Dipper	φ Sgr	Nandou	南斗一	Nándǒuyī	1st southern dipper
Black Tortoise of the North (北方玄武)	斗	Dǒu	Dipper	斗	Dǒu	Dipper	φ Sgr	Nandou	天府	Tiānfǔ	
Black Tortoise of the North (北方玄武)	斗	Dǒu	Dipper	斗	Dǒu	Dipper	φ Sgr	Nandou	司令鎮國上將	Sīlìngzhēnguóshàng	High officer in charge of controlling in country town
Black Tortoise of the North (北方玄武)	斗	Dǒu	Dipper	斗	Dǒu	Dipper	φ Sgr	Nandou	令星	Lìngxīng	Honored star
Black Tortoise of the North (北方玄武)	斗	Dǒu	Dipper	斗	Dǒu	Dipper	φ Sgr	Nandou	禄库	Lùkù	Storehouse of good fortune
Black Tortoise of the North (北方玄武)	斗	Dǒu	Dipper	斗	Dǒu	Dipper	λ Sgr	Kaus Borealis			
Black Tortoise of the North (北方玄武)	斗	Dǒu	Dipper	斗	Dǒu	Dipper	λ Sgr	Kaus Borealis	斗宿二	Dǒusùèr	2nd star
Black Tortoise of the North (北方玄武)	斗	Dǒu	Dipper	斗	Dǒu	Dipper	λ Sgr	Kaus Borealis	斗宿魁第二星	Dǒusùkuídìèrxīng	2nd chief star
Black Tortoise of the North (北方玄武)	斗	Dǒu	Dipper	斗	Dǒu	Dipper	λ Sgr	Kaus Borealis	南斗二	Nándǒuèr	2nd southern dipper
Black Tortoise of the North (北方玄武)	斗	Dǒu	Dipper	斗	Dǒu	Dipper	λ Sgr	Kaus Borealis	天梁	Tiānliáng	
Black Tortoise of the North (北方玄武)	斗	Dǒu	Dipper	斗	Dǒu	Dipper	μ Sgr	Polis (for component Aa)			
Black Tortoise of the North (北方玄武)	斗	Dǒu	Dipper	斗	Dǒu	Dipper	μ Sgr	Polis (for component Aa)	斗宿三	Dǒusùsān	3rd star
Black Tortoise of the North (北方玄武)	斗	Dǒu	Dipper	斗	Dǒu	Dipper	μ Sgr	Polis (for component Aa)	斗宿魁第三星	Dǒusùkuídìsānxīng	3rd chief star
Black Tortoise of the North (北方玄武)	斗	Dǒu	Dipper	斗	Dǒu	Dipper	μ Sgr	Polis (for component Aa)	南斗三	Nándǒusān	3rd southern dipper
Black Tortoise of the North (北方玄武)	斗	Dǒu	Dipper	斗	Dǒu	Dipper	μ Sgr	Polis (for component Aa)	天机	Tiānjī	
Black Tortoise of the North (北方玄武)	斗	Dǒu	Dipper	斗	Dǒu	Dipper	μ Sgr	Polis (for component Aa)	善宿	Shànsù	Good lodge
Black Tortoise of the North (北方玄武)	斗	Dǒu	Dipper	斗	Dǒu	Dipper	σ Sgr	Nunki			
Black Tortoise of the North (北方玄武)	斗	Dǒu	Dipper	斗	Dǒu	Dipper	σ Sgr	Nunki	斗宿四	Dǒusùsì	4th star
Black Tortoise of the North (北方玄武)	斗	Dǒu	Dipper	斗	Dǒu	Dipper	σ Sgr	Nunki	斗宿魁第四星	Dǒusùkuídìsìxīng	4th chief star
Black Tortoise of the North (北方玄武)	斗	Dǒu	Dipper	斗	Dǒu	Dipper	σ Sgr	Nunki	南斗四	Nándǒusì	4th southern dipper
Black Tortoise of the North (北方玄武)	斗	Dǒu	Dipper	斗	Dǒu	Dipper	σ Sgr	Nunki	天同	Tiāntóng	
Black Tortoise of the North (北方玄武)	斗	Dǒu	Dipper	斗	Dǒu	Dipper	σ Sgr	Nunki	天庙	Tiānmiào	Celestial temple
Black Tortoise of the North (北方玄武)	斗	Dǒu	Dipper	斗	Dǒu	Dipper	τ Sgr				
Black Tortoise of the North (北方玄武)	斗	Dǒu	Dipper	斗	Dǒu	Dipper	τ Sgr		斗宿五	Dǒusùwu	5th star
Black Tortoise of the North (北方玄武)	斗	Dǒu	Dipper	斗	Dǒu	Dipper	τ Sgr		斗宿魁第五星	Dǒusùkuídìwuxīng	5th chief star
Black Tortoise of the North (北方玄武)	斗	Dǒu	Dipper	斗	Dǒu	Dipper	τ Sgr		南斗五	Nándǒuwu	5th southern dipper
Black Tortoise of the North (北方玄武)	斗	Dǒu	Dipper	斗	Dǒu	Dipper	ζ Sgr	Ascella (for component Aa)			
Black Tortoise of the North (北方玄武)	斗	Dǒu	Dipper	斗	Dǒu	Dipper	ζ Sgr	Ascella (for component Aa)	斗宿六	Dǒusùliù	6th star
Black Tortoise of the North (北方玄武)	斗	Dǒu	Dipper	斗	Dǒu	Dipper	ζ Sgr	Ascella (for component Aa)	斗宿魁第六星	Dǒusùkuídìliùxīng	6th chief star
Black Tortoise of the North (北方玄武)	斗	Dǒu	Dipper	斗	Dǒu	Dipper	ζ Sgr	Ascella (for component Aa)	南斗六	Nándǒuliù	6th southern dipper
Black Tortoise of the North (北方玄武)	斗	Dǒu	Dipper	斗	Dǒu	Dipper	ζ Sgr	Ascella (for component Aa)	七殺星	Qīshāxīng	Star of seven murder
Black Tortoise of the North (北方玄武)	斗	Dǒu	Dipper	斗	Dǒu	Dipper	6 Sgr		斗宿增一	Dǒusùzēngyī	1st additional star
Black Tortoise of the North (北方玄武)	斗	Dǒu	Dipper	斗	Dǒu	Dipper	15 Sgr		斗宿增二	Dǒusùzēngèr	2nd additional star
Black Tortoise of the North (北方玄武)	斗	Dǒu	Dipper	斗	Dǒu	Dipper	21 Sgr		斗宿增三	Dǒusùzēngsān	3rd additional star
Black Tortoise of the North (北方玄武)	斗	Dǒu	Dipper	斗	Dǒu	Dipper	26 Sgr		斗宿增四	Dǒusùzēngísì	4th additional star
Black Tortoise of the North (北方玄武)	斗	Dǒu	Dipper	斗	Dǒu	Dipper	26 Sgr		斗宿增四	Dǒusùzēngísì	4th additional star
Black Tortoise of the North (北方玄武)	斗	Dǒu	Dipper	建	Jiàn	Establishment					
Black Tortoise of the North (北方玄武)	斗	Dǒu	Dipper	建	Jiàn	Establishment	ξ^{2} Sgr	Jian			
Black Tortoise of the North (北方玄武)	斗	Dǒu	Dipper	建	Jiàn	Establishment	ξ^{2} Sgr	Jian	建一	Jiànyī	1st star
Black Tortoise of the North (北方玄武)	斗	Dǒu	Dipper	建	Jiàn	Establishment	ξ^{2} Sgr	Jian	建西第一星	Jiànxīdìyīxīng	1st western star
Black Tortoise of the North (北方玄武)	斗	Dǒu	Dipper	建	Jiàn	Establishment	ξ^{2} Sgr	Jian	西建西星	Xījiànxīxīng	Star in the west of western establishment
Black Tortoise of the North (北方玄武)	斗	Dǒu	Dipper	建	Jiàn	Establishment	ο Sgr	Alqiladah			
Black Tortoise of the North (北方玄武)	斗	Dǒu	Dipper	建	Jiàn	Establishment	ο Sgr	Alqiladah	建二	Jiànèr	2nd star
Black Tortoise of the North (北方玄武)	斗	Dǒu	Dipper	建	Jiàn	Establishment	ο Sgr	Alqiladah	建西第二星	Jiànxīdìèrxīng	2nd western star
Black Tortoise of the North (北方玄武)	斗	Dǒu	Dipper	建	Jiàn	Establishment	ο Sgr	Alqiladah	西建中星	Xījiànzhōngxīng	Star in the central of western establishment
Black Tortoise of the North (北方玄武)	斗	Dǒu	Dipper	建	Jiàn	Establishment	π Sgr	Albaldah (for component A)			
Black Tortoise of the North (北方玄武)	斗	Dǒu	Dipper	建	Jiàn	Establishment	π Sgr	Albaldah (for component A)	建三	Jiànsān	3rd star
Black Tortoise of the North (北方玄武)	斗	Dǒu	Dipper	建	Jiàn	Establishment	π Sgr	Albaldah (for component A)	建西第二星	Jiànxīdìèrxīng	2nd western star
Black Tortoise of the North (北方玄武)	斗	Dǒu	Dipper	建	Jiàn	Establishment	π Sgr	Albaldah (for component A)	西建东星	Xījiàndōngxīng	Star in the east of western establishment
Black Tortoise of the North (北方玄武)	斗	Dǒu	Dipper	建	Jiàn	Establishment	43 Sgr		建四	Jiànsì	4th star
Black Tortoise of the North (北方玄武)	斗	Dǒu	Dipper	建	Jiàn	Establishment	ρ^{1} Sgr	Kenemu			
Black Tortoise of the North (北方玄武)	斗	Dǒu	Dipper	建	Jiàn	Establishment	ρ^{1} Sgr	Kenemu	建五	Jiànwǔ	5th star
Black Tortoise of the North (北方玄武)	斗	Dǒu	Dipper	建	Jiàn	Establishment	ρ^{1} Sgr	Kenemu	建东第二星	Jiàndōngdìèrxīng	2nd eastern star
Black Tortoise of the North (北方玄武)	斗	Dǒu	Dipper	建	Jiàn	Establishment	ρ^{1} Sgr	Kenemu	东建中星	Dōngjiànzhōngxīng	Star in the east of eastern establishment
Black Tortoise of the North (北方玄武)	斗	Dǒu	Dipper	建	Jiàn	Establishment	υ Sgr		建六	Jiànliù	6th star
Black Tortoise of the North (北方玄武)	斗	Dǒu	Dipper	建	Jiàn	Establishment	29 Sgr		建增一	Jiànzēngyī	1st additional star
Black Tortoise of the North (北方玄武)	斗	Dǒu	Dipper	建	Jiàn	Establishment	ξ^{1} Sgr		建增二	Jiànzēngèr	2nd additional star
Black Tortoise of the North (北方玄武)	斗	Dǒu	Dipper	建	Jiàn	Establishment	33 Sgr		建增三	Jiànzēngsān	3rd additional star
Black Tortoise of the North (北方玄武)	斗	Dǒu	Dipper	建	Jiàn	Establishment	31 Sgr		建增四	Jiànzēngsì	4th additional star
Black Tortoise of the North (北方玄武)	斗	Dǒu	Dipper	建	Jiàn	Establishment	30 Sgr		建增五	Jiànzēngwǔ	5th additional star
Black Tortoise of the North (北方玄武)	斗	Dǒu	Dipper	建	Jiàn	Establishment	ν^{1} Sgr	Ainalrami (for component A)	建增六	Jiànzēngliù	6th additional star
Black Tortoise of the North (北方玄武)	斗	Dǒu	Dipper	建	Jiàn	Establishment	ν^{2} Sgr	Pabilsang	建增七	Jiànzēngqī	7th additional star
Black Tortoise of the North (北方玄武)	斗	Dǒu	Dipper	建	Jiàn	Establishment	ρ^{2} Sgr		建增八	Jiànzēngbā	8th additional star
Black Tortoise of the North (北方玄武)	斗	Dǒu	Dipper	建	Jiàn	Establishment	HD 180562		建增九	Jiànzēngjiǔ	9th additional star
Black Tortoise of the North (北方玄武)	斗	Dǒu	Dipper	建	Jiàn	Establishment	HD 180699		建增十	Jiànzēngshí	10th additional star
Black Tortoise of the North (北方玄武)	斗	Dǒu	Dipper	天雞	Tiānjī	Celestial Cock					
Black Tortoise of the North (北方玄武)	斗	Dǒu	Dipper	天雞	Tiānjī	Celestial Cock	55 Sgr		天雞一	Tiānjīyī	1st star
Black Tortoise of the North (北方玄武)	斗	Dǒu	Dipper	天雞	Tiānjī	Celestial Cock	56 Sgr		天雞二	Tiānjīèr	2nd star
Black Tortoise of the North (北方玄武)	斗	Dǒu	Dipper	天雞	Tiānjī	Celestial Cock	54 Sgr		天雞增一	Tiānjīzēngyī	1st additional star
Black Tortoise of the North (北方玄武)	斗	Dǒu	Dipper	天雞	Tiānjī	Celestial Cock	57 Sgr		天雞增二	Tiānjīzēngèr	2nd additional star
Black Tortoise of the North (北方玄武)	斗	Dǒu	Dipper	天雞	Tiānjī	Celestial Cock	61 Sgr		天雞增三	Tiānjīzēngsān	3rd additional star
Black Tortoise of the North (北方玄武)	斗	Dǒu	Dipper	天籥	Tiānyuè	Celestial Keyhole					
Black Tortoise of the North (北方玄武)	斗	Dǒu	Dipper	天籥	Tiānyuè	Celestial Keyhole	63 Oph		天籥一	Tiānyuèyī	1st star
Black Tortoise of the North (北方玄武)	斗	Dǒu	Dipper	天籥	Tiānyuè	Celestial Keyhole	HD 161664		天籥二	Tiānyuèèr	2nd star
Black Tortoise of the North (北方玄武)	斗	Dǒu	Dipper	天籥	Tiānyuè	Celestial Keyhole	3 Sgr				
Black Tortoise of the North (北方玄武)	斗	Dǒu	Dipper	天籥	Tiānyuè	Celestial Keyhole	3 Sgr		天龠八	Tiānyuèbā	8th star
Black Tortoise of the North (北方玄武)	斗	Dǒu	Dipper	天籥	Tiānyuè	Celestial Keyhole	3 Sgr		天鑰八	Tiānyàobā	8th key
Black Tortoise of the North (北方玄武)	斗	Dǒu	Dipper	天籥	Tiānyuè	Celestial Keyhole	4 Sgr	Tianyue	天龠增二	Tiānyuèzēngèr	2nd additional star
Black Tortoise of the North (北方玄武)	斗	Dǒu	Dipper	天籥	Tiānyuè	Celestial Keyhole	5 Sgr		天龠增三	Tiānyuèzēngsān	3rd additional star
Black Tortoise of the North (北方玄武)	斗	Dǒu	Dipper	天籥	Tiānyuè	Celestial Keyhole	7 Sgr		天龠增四	Tiānyuèzēngsì	4th additional star
Black Tortoise of the North (北方玄武)	斗	Dǒu	Dipper	狗國	Gǒuguó	Dog Territory					
Black Tortoise of the North (北方玄武)	斗	Dǒu	Dipper	狗國	Gǒuguó	Dog Territory	ω Sgr	Terebellum	狗國一	Gǒuguóyī	1st star
Black Tortoise of the North (北方玄武)	斗	Dǒu	Dipper	狗國	Gǒuguó	Dog Territory	60 Sgr		狗國二	Gǒuguóèr	2nd star
Black Tortoise of the North (北方玄武)	斗	Dǒu	Dipper	狗國	Gǒuguó	Dog Territory	62 Sgr	Gouguo	狗國三	Gǒuguósān	3rd star
Black Tortoise of the North (北方玄武)	斗	Dǒu	Dipper	狗國	Gǒuguó	Dog Territory	59 Sgr		狗國四	Gǒuguósì	4th star
Black Tortoise of the North (北方玄武)	斗	Dǒu	Dipper	狗國	Gǒuguó	Dog Territory	HD 190056		狗國增一	Gǒuguózēngyī	1st additional star
Black Tortoise of the North (北方玄武)	斗	Dǒu	Dipper	狗國	Gǒuguó	Dog Territory	θ^{2} Sgr		狗國二	Gǒuguóèr	2nd star
Black Tortoise of the North (北方玄武)	斗	Dǒu	Dipper	狗國	Gǒuguó	Dog Territory	HD 191408		狗國增三	Gǒuguózēngsān	3rd additional star
Black Tortoise of the North (北方玄武)	斗	Dǒu	Dipper	天淵	Tiānyuān	Celestial Spring					
Black Tortoise of the North (北方玄武)	斗	Dǒu	Dipper	天淵	Tiānyuān	Celestial Spring	β^{2} Sgr	Arkab Posterior (for component A)	天淵一	Tiānyuānyī	1st star
Black Tortoise of the North (北方玄武)	斗	Dǒu	Dipper	天淵	Tiānyuān	Celestial Spring	β^{1} Sgr	Arkab Prior (for component A)	天淵二	Tiānyuānèr	2nd star
Black Tortoise of the North (北方玄武)	斗	Dǒu	Dipper	天淵	Tiānyuān	Celestial Spring	α Sgr	Rukbat	天淵三	Tiānyuānsān	3rd star
Black Tortoise of the North (北方玄武)	斗	Dǒu	Dipper	天淵	Tiānyuān	Celestial Spring	ι Sgr		天淵增一	Tiānyuānzēngyī	1st additional star
Black Tortoise of the North (北方玄武)	斗	Dǒu	Dipper	天淵	Tiānyuān	Celestial Spring	θ^{1} Sgr		天淵增二	Tiānyuānzēngèr	2nd additional star
Black Tortoise of the North (北方玄武)	斗	Dǒu	Dipper	天淵	Tiānyuān	Celestial Spring	HD 189831		天淵增三	Tiānyuānzēngsān	3rd additional star
Black Tortoise of the North (北方玄武)	斗	Dǒu	Dipper	狗	Gǒu	Dog					
Black Tortoise of the North (北方玄武)	斗	Dǒu	Dipper	狗	Gǒu	Dog	52 Sgr		狗一	Gǒuyī	1st star
Black Tortoise of the North (北方玄武)	斗	Dǒu	Dipper	狗	Gǒu	Dog	χ^{1} Sgr		狗二	Gǒuèr	2nd star
Black Tortoise of the North (北方玄武)	斗	Dǒu	Dipper	狗	Gǒu	Dog	51 Sgr		狗增一	Gǒuzēngyī	1st additional star
Black Tortoise of the North (北方玄武)	斗	Dǒu	Dipper	狗	Gǒu	Dog	53 Sgr		狗增二	Gǒuzēngèr	2nd additional star
Black Tortoise of the North (北方玄武)	斗	Dǒu	Dipper	狗	Gǒu	Dog	50 Sgr		狗增三	Gǒuzēngsān	3rd additional star
Black Tortoise of the North (北方玄武)	斗	Dǒu	Dipper	狗	Gǒu	Dog	χ^{3} Sgr		狗增四	Gǒuzēngsì	4th additional star
Black Tortoise of the North (北方玄武)	斗	Dǒu	Dipper	狗	Gǒu	Dog	48 Sgr		狗增五	Gǒuzēngwǔ	5th additional star
Black Tortoise of the North (北方玄武)	斗	Dǒu	Dipper	狗	Gǒu	Dog	ψ Sgr		狗增六	Gǒuzēngliù	6th additional star
Black Tortoise of the North (北方玄武)	斗	Dǒu	Dipper	農丈人	Nóngzhàngrén	Peasant	HD 172910		農丈人	Nóngzhàngrén	(One star of)

== See also ==
- Chinese astronomy
- Traditional Chinese star names
- Chinese constellations
