= Peasant (disambiguation) =

Peasants are a traditional class of farmers.

Peasant(s) or The Peasant(s) may also refer to:

== Literature ==
- The Peasants, a Polish novel written between 1904 and 1909 by Władysław Reymont

== Film ==
- The Peasants (1973 film), a 1973 Polish film based on Reymont's novel
- Peasants (film), a 1978 South Korean film
- The Peasants (2023 film), a 2023 Polish film based on Reymont's novel and produced using painted animation

== Music ==
- Peasant, an album by American band Thou
- Peasant (album), avant-garde folk album by Richard Dawson

== Other uses ==
- HD 172910, a star known in Chinese astronomy as the Peasant
