= H Sagittarii =

The Bayer designation h Sagittarii refer to two different stars in the constellation Sagittarius:

- h^{1} Sagittarii (51 Sagittarii, V5548 Sagittarii, HD 184552, HIP 96406)
- h^{2} Sagittarii (52 Sagittarii, HD 184707, HIP 96465, HR 7440)
