= HD 167818 =

Star in the constellation Sagittarius

- Location of HD 167818 (circled)

Observation data Epoch J2000 Equinox ICRS
- Constellation: Sagittarius
- Right ascension: 18^{h} 18^{m} 03.19136^{s}
- Declination: −27° 02′ 33.5149″
- Apparent magnitude (V): 4.66

Characteristics
- Spectral type: K3II
- U−B color index: +1.80
- B−V color index: +1.66

Astrometry
Radial velocity (R_{v})	-16.90 km/s
Proper motion (μ)	RA: +5.28 mas/yr Dec.: -3.57 mas/yr
Parallax (π)	4.28±0.33 mas
Distance	760 ± 60 ly (230 ± 20 pc)
Absolute magnitude (M_{V})	-2.17

Details
Mass	6.3 M_{☉}
Luminosity	1,810 L_{☉}
Surface gravity (log g)	2.00 cgs
Temperature	4,030 K
Metallicity [Fe/H]	-0.20 dex
Rotational velocity (v sin i)	2.9 km/s

Other designations
- CD-27°12684, GC 24961, GSC 06852-05204, HIP 89678, HR 6842, HD 167818, SAO 186612

Database references
SIMBAD	data

HD 167818 is a class K3II (orange bright giant) star in the constellation Sagittarius. Its apparent magnitude is 4.66 and it is approximately 760 light years away based on parallax.
