= 17 Sagittarii =

Binary star system in the constellation Sagittarius

Observation data Epoch J2000.0 Equinox ICRS
- Constellation: Sagittarius
- Right ascension: 18^{h} 16^{m} 35.36860^{s}
- Declination: −20° 32′ 40.1303″
- Apparent magnitude (V): 6.89 (7.24 + 8.89)

Characteristics
- Spectral type: G8/K0 III + A4:
- B−V color index: 1.027±0.015

Astrometry
Radial velocity (R_{v})	−13.88±0.51 km/s
Proper motion (μ)	RA: 10.978 mas/yr Dec.: −14.342 mas/yr
Parallax (π)	4.8289±0.0505 mas
Distance	675 ± 7 ly (207 ± 2 pc)
Absolute magnitude (M_{V})	0.68

Details
Luminosity	73.21 L_{☉}
Temperature	4700 K

Other designations
- 17 Sgr, BD−20°5068, HD 167570, HIP 89567, SAO 186575, WDS 18166-2033

Database references
SIMBAD	data

17 Sagittarii is a binary star system in the zodiac constellation of Sagittarius, located 675 light years from the Sun. With a combined apparent visual magnitude of 6.89 it is below the normal limit of visibility to the naked eye. The system is moving closer to the Earth with a heliocentric radial velocity of −14 km/s. J. Allen Hynek (1938) found an initial spectral type of G5 + A5 for the pair. It was first resolved by Harold A. McAlister (1978), who found an angular separation of 0.260″±0.002″ along a position angle of 133.0°±1.2°

The magnitude 7.24 primary component is an evolved giant star with a stellar classification of G8/K0 III, indicating it has exhausted the hydrogen at its core and expanded off the main sequence. It is radiating 73 times the Sun's luminosity from its enlarged photosphere at an effective temperature of 4,700 K. The companion is a hot A-type star of uncertain luminosity class, with a visual magnitude of 8.89.
