= HD 187474 =

Star in the constellation Sagittarius

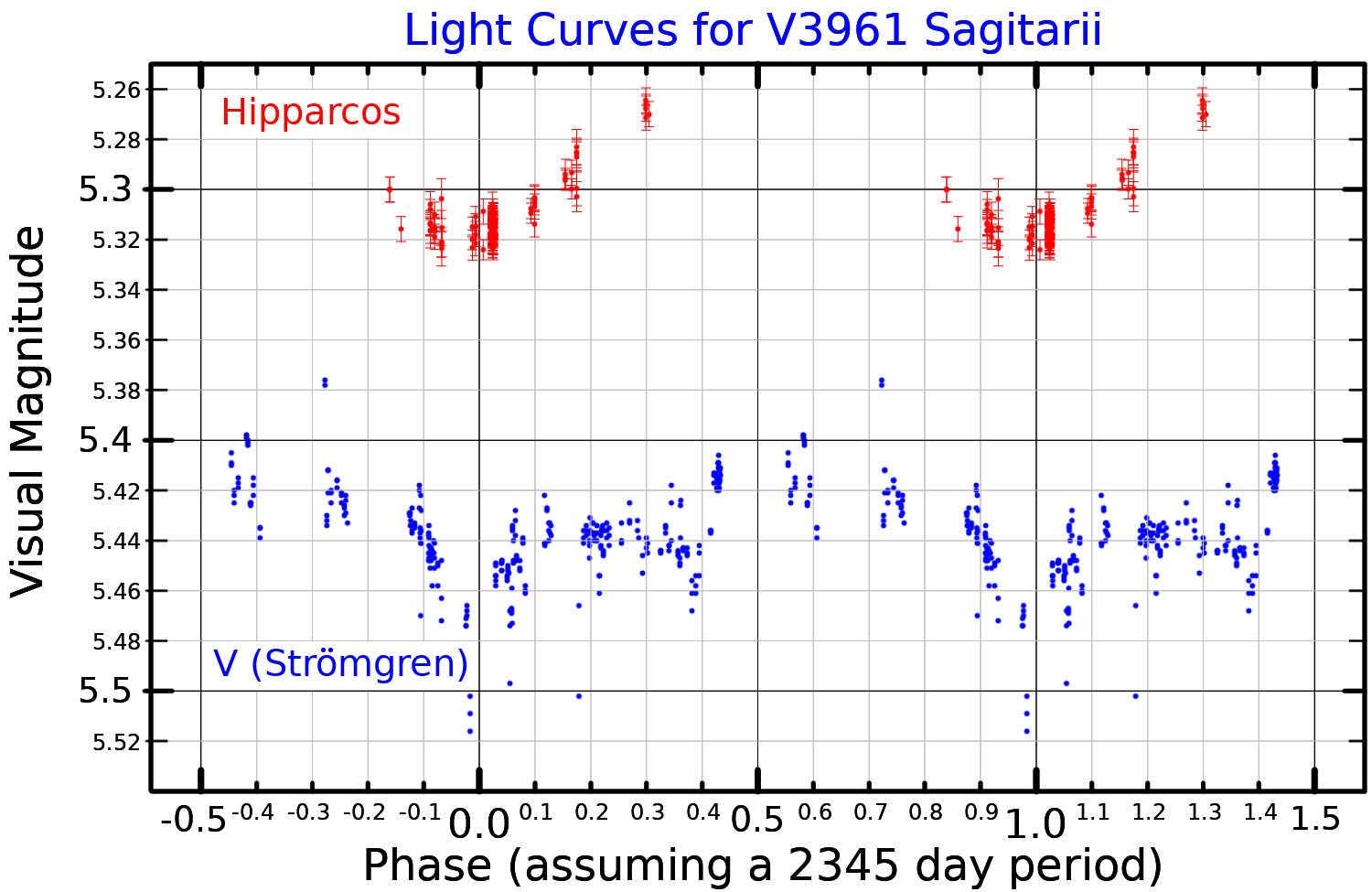
- Visual band light curves for V3961 Sagittarii. The red points show the Hipparcos data, and the blue points show data from Mikulášek et al.

Observation data Epoch J2000 Equinox ICRS
- Constellation: Sagittatius
- Right ascension: 19^{h} 51^{m} 50.61067^{s}
- Declination: −39° 52′ 27.7383″
- Apparent magnitude (V): 5.28 – 5.34

Characteristics
- Evolutionary stage: main sequence
- Spectral type: A0 EuCrSr
- Variable type: α^{2} CVn

Astrometry
Proper motion (μ)	RA: 17.944±0.460 mas/yr Dec.: −11.878±0.278 mas/yr
Parallax (π)	10.3412±0.3119 mas
Distance	315 ± 10 ly (97 ± 3 pc)
Absolute magnitude (M_{V})	+0.51

Orbit
Period (P)	690 d
Eccentricity (e)	0.45

Details
Mass	2.7 M_{☉}
Radius	3.7 R_{☉}
Luminosity	75 L_{☉}
Surface gravity (log g)	3.80 cgs
Temperature	10,350 K
Rotational velocity (v sin i)	5 km/s
Age	318 Myr

Other designations
- V3961 Sgr, HIP 97749, HR 7552, SAO 229903

Database references
SIMBAD	data

HD 187474, also known as HR 7552 and V3961 Sagittarii, is a star about 315 light years from the Earth, in the constellation Sagittarius. It is a 5th magnitude star, so it will be faintly visible to the naked eye of an observer far from city lights. It is a variable star, whose brightness varies slightly from magnitude 5.28 to 5.34. HD 187474 is classified as an Alpha2 Canum Venaticorum variable star, but it has a rotation period of 2,345 days - more than an order of magnitude longer than is typical for that class. HD 187474 is an Ap star.

In 1958, Horace Babcock announced that HD 187474 has a magnetic field, the strength of which he estimated to be 1867 gauss. He found the star to be remarkable, because it was the only A-type star he had found that seemed to have a magnetic field which did not vary in time. However this perceived consistency turned out to be the result of Babcock's observations covering only a small portion of the star's unexpectedly long variability period.

HD 187474 is a single-lined spectroscopic binary. This was discovered by Sylvia Burd at Palomar Observatory, and the result was communicated to S. Leeman by Babcock. Leeman published the finding in 1964, along with orbital elements derived by Burd. The initial estimate of the orbital period was 700 days.

The variability of HD 187474 was apparently discovered by Babcock sometime prior to 1976, the year when it was given the variable star designation V3961 Sagittarii, but the result was never published by him.

Several groups have tried to determine the strength and geometry of HD 187474's magnetic field. In 1987 Pierre Didelon derived a surface field strength of 5.0±0.4 kilogauss, from observations of Zeeman splitting of spectral lines. In the year 2000, John Landstreet and Gautier Mathys found that the variation of the measured magnetic field as the star rotated was far from sinusoidal. They obtained an acceptable fit to the data with a model of the field which contained colinear dipole, quadrupole and octupole terms. Two years later, Stefano Bagnulo et al. modeled the field as a dipole inclined 80° with respect to the rotation axis plus a nonlinear quadrupole term. The next year, V. R. Khalack et al. modeled the field as a set of virtual magnetic charges, with the constraint that the total magnetic charge must be zero. In 2005, Yu. V. Glagolevskij modeled the field as a dipole displaced from the star's center, and inclined relative to the rotation axis by 24°.
