= 18 Sagittarii =

Star in the constellation Sagittarius

Observation data Epoch J2000.0 Equinox ICRS
- Constellation: Sagittarius
- Right ascension: 18^{h} 25^{m} 01.42727^{s}
- Declination: −30° 45′ 23.6167″
- Apparent magnitude (V): 5.58

Characteristics
- Evolutionary stage: red giant branch
- Spectral type: K0 III
- B−V color index: 1.138

Astrometry
Radial velocity (R_{v})	−18.7±2.9 km/s
Proper motion (μ)	RA: −134.805 mas/yr Dec.: −71.730 mas/yr
Parallax (π)	5.7300±0.1342 mas
Distance	570 ± 10 ly (175 ± 4 pc)
Absolute magnitude (M_{V})	−0.93

Details
Radius	29 R_{☉}
Luminosity	309 L_{☉}
Surface gravity (log g)	1.50 cgs
Temperature	4,341 K
Metallicity [Fe/H]	−0.79 dex
Rotational velocity (v sin i)	1.0 km/s

Other designations
- 18 Sgr, CD−30°15661, HD 169233, HIP 90260, HR 6888, SAO 210116

Database references
SIMBAD	data

18 Sagittarii is a single star in zodiac constellation of Sagittarius, located around 570 light years away from the Sun based on parallax. It is visible to the naked eye as a faint, orange-hued star with an apparent visual magnitude of 5.58. This object is moving closer to the Earth with a heliocentric radial velocity of −19 km/s.

This is an aging giant star with a stellar classification of K0 III, which indicates it has exhausted the hydrogen at its core and evolved away from the main sequence. It has expanded to about 29 times the Sun's radius and is radiating 309 times the Sun's luminosity from its enlarged photosphere at an effective temperature of 4,341 K. There is a much lower abundance of iron in the spectrum compared to the Sun.
