= Y Sagittarii =

Variable star in the constellation of Sagittarius

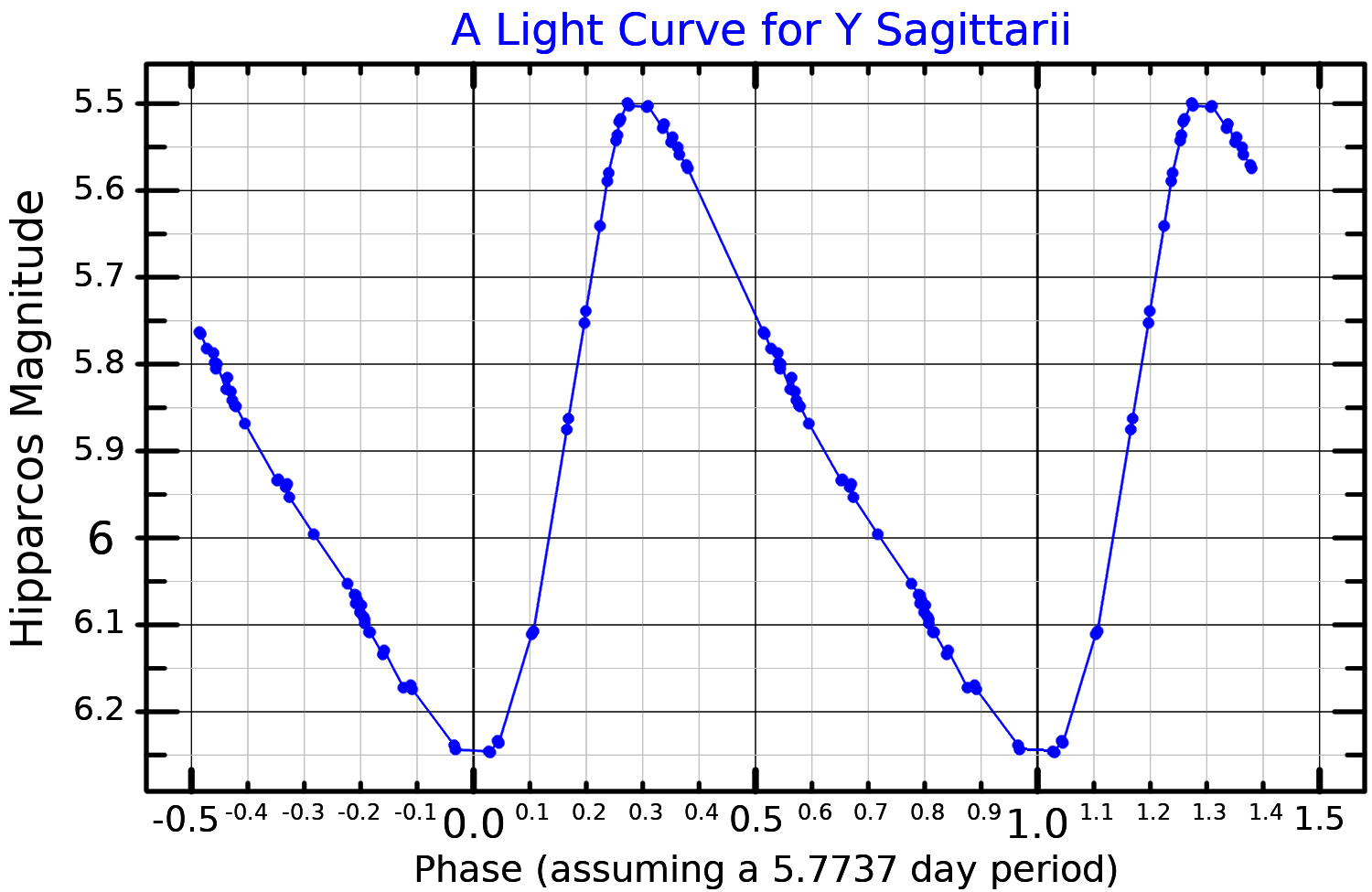
- A light curve for Y Sagittarii, plotted from Hipparcos data

Observation data Epoch J2000 Equinox ICRS
- Constellation: Sagittarius
- Right ascension: 18^{h} 21^{m} 22.98643^{s}
- Declination: −18° 51′ 36.0018″
- Apparent magnitude (V): 5.25 to 6.24

Characteristics
- Spectral type: F8 II
- B−V color index: 0.67±0.02
- Variable type: Cepheid variable

Astrometry
Radial velocity (R_{v})	−1.4±2.3 km/s
Proper motion (μ)	RA: −3.12 mas/yr Dec.: −7.12 mas/yr
Parallax (π)	2.13±0.29 mas
Distance	approx. 1,500 ly (approx. 470 pc)
Absolute magnitude (M_{V})	−2.06

Details
Surface gravity (log g)	1.80 cgs
Temperature	5,967±26 K
Age	330 Myr

Other designations
- 57 G. Sgr, Y Sgr, BD−18° 4926, HD 168608, HIP 89968, HR 6863

Database references
SIMBAD	data

Y Sagittarii is a variable star in the constellation of Sagittarius. It is a Cepheid variable with an apparent magnitude of about six. It is faintly visible to the naked eye of an observer with dark skies, far from city lights. The measure of its parallax by Hubble Space Telescope puts Y Sagittarii to 1,293 light-years away from the Solar System.

In 1879, the star was listed as number 57 in Benjamin Apthorp Gould's Uranometria Argentina. Edwin Forrest Sawyer discovered that it is a short period variable star in 1886, when it was still referred to by its Gould number. It appeared with its variable star designation, Y Sagittarii, in Annie Jump Cannon's 1907 work Second catalogue of variable stars. The brightness ranges in Y Sagittarii's apparent magnitude varies from +5.25 and +6.24 in a period of 5.7736 days. The spectral type of this star is F8II, while the effective temperature is 5370 K. It has a radius 50 times larger than the Sun, while its projected rotational velocity of 16 km / s and it has an estimated mass six times that of the Sun. The star's metal content is similar to Sun, with an index of metallicity [Fe / H] = +0.05. For other metals tested, it shows some overabundance of copper, zinc, yttrium and sodium; the level of the elements is almost double that of the Sun ([Na / H] = +0.27).

There is evidence that Y Sagittarii may be a spectroscopic binary. It has been suggested that the orbital period for the system is on the order of 10,000 to 12,000 days. However, subsequent studies assume eccentricity zero for orbit, and they have failed to find a convincing orbital solution. Instead, it appears to be a distant visual companion.
