= RS Sagittarii =

Eclipsing binary star system in the constellation Sagittarius

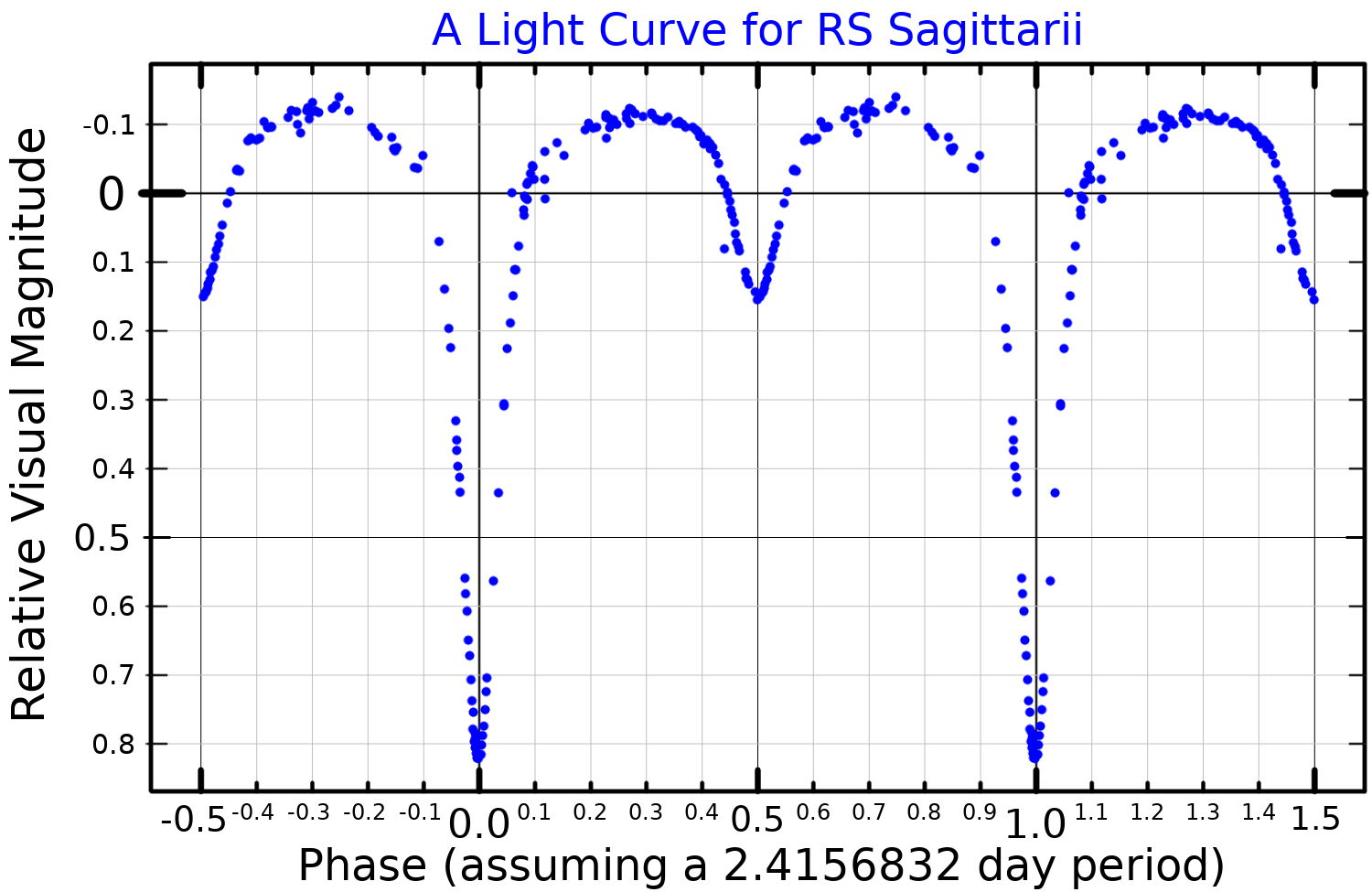
- A visual band light curve for RS Sagittarii, adapted from Shobbrook (2005)

Observation data Epoch J2000 Equinox ICRS
- Constellation: Sagittarius
- A
- Right ascension: 18^{h} 17^{m} 36.246^{s}
- Declination: −34° 06′ 26.16″
- Apparent magnitude (V): max: 6.01 min_{1}: 6.97 min_{2}: 6.28
- B
- Right ascension: 18^{h} 17^{m} 39.372^{s}
- Declination: −34° 06′ 22.8346″
- Apparent magnitude (V): 9.469±0.049
- C
- Right ascension: 18^{h} 17^{m} 41.174^{s}
- Declination: −34° 05′ 14.68″
- Apparent magnitude (V): 8.69±0.02

Characteristics
- Evolutionary stage: Main sequence(Aa) + giant star(Ab)
- Spectral type: B3V (Aa); A0III (Ab); A1V (B); B9V (C)
- B−V color index: −0.096±0.012
- Variable type: Semidetached Algol

Astrometry

A
| Radial velocity (R_{v}) | 10.1±4.3 km/s |
| Proper motion (μ) | RA: −2.946 mas/yr Dec.: −10.190 mas/yr |
| Parallax (π) | 2.2918±0.0977 mas |
| Distance | 1,360±49 ly (418±15 pc) |
| Absolute magnitude (M_{V}) | −4.02 + −1.09 |

B
| Radial velocity (R_{v}) | −1.36±4.87 km/s |
| Proper motion (μ) | RA: −3.931±0.055 mas/yr Dec.: −10.122±0.041 mas/yr |
| Parallax (π) | 2.2281±0.0508 mas |
| Distance | 1,460 ± 30 ly (450 ± 10 pc) |

C
| Proper motion (μ) | RA: −3.144±0.030 mas/yr Dec.: −10.862±0.023 mas/yr |
| Parallax (π) | 2.3625±0.0289 mas |
| Distance | 1,380 ± 20 ly (423 ± 5 pc) |

Orbit
| Period (P) | 2.4156835 days |
| Semi-major axis (a) | 17.32±0.02 R_{☉} |
| Eccentricity (e) | 0.0 |
| Inclination (i) | 82.829±0.074° |
| Periastron epoch (T) | 2,452,503.587±0.003 HJD |
| Semi-amplitude (K_{1}) (primary) | 88.34±0.13 km/s |
| Semi-amplitude (K_{2}) (secondary) | 271.53±0.13 km/s |

Details

Aa
| Mass | 8.846±0.015 M_{☉} |
| Radius | 5.524±0.022 R_{☉} |
| Luminosity | 3,700+90 −80 L_{☉} |
| Surface gravity (log g) | 3.900±0.005 cgs |
| Temperature | 19,000±100 K |
| Metallicity [Fe/H] | 0.0 dex |
| Rotational velocity (v sin i) | 115±5 km/s |

Ab
| Mass | 2.875±0.012 M_{☉} |
| Radius | 4.929±0.014 R_{☉} |
| Luminosity | 195+14 −13 L_{☉} |
| Surface gravity (log g) | 3.450±0.003 cgs |
| Temperature | 9,680±124 K |
| Metallicity [Fe/H] | 0.0 dex |
| Rotational velocity (v sin i) | 90±5 km/s |

B
| Mass | 2.368+0.015 −0.016 M_{☉} |
| Radius | 2.158+0.034 −0.033 R_{☉} |
| Luminosity | 36.7+0.01 −0.02 L_{☉} |
| Surface gravity (log g) | 4.107±0.006 cgs |
| Temperature | 10,067±5 K |
| Metallicity [Fe/H] | −0.286±0.004 dex |
| Age | 232+50 −40 Myr |

C
| Mass | 2.784+0.123 −0.122 M_{☉} |
| Radius | 2.795+0.004 −0.005 R_{☉} |
| Luminosity | 81.6+0.01 −0.02 L_{☉} |
| Surface gravity (log g) | 3.855±0.001 cgs |
| Temperature | 10,664±4 K |
| Metallicity [Fe/H] | −1.418±0.001 dex |
| Age | 271+90 −80 Myr |

Other designations
- RS Sgr, CD−34°12673, GC 24947, HD 167647, HIP 89637, HR 6833, SAO 209959, WDS J18176-3406A

Database references
| SIMBAD | data |

RS Sagittarii is an eclipsing binary star system in the southern constellation of Sagittarius, abbreviated RS Sgr. It is a double-lined spectroscopic binary with an orbital period of 2.416 days, indicating that the components are too close to each other to be individually resolved. The system has a combined apparent visual magnitude of 6.01, which is bright enough to be faintly visible to the naked eye. During the primary eclipse the brightness drops to magnitude 6.97, while the secondary eclipse is of magnitude 6.28. The distance to this system is 418 parsecs (1,360 light-years).

== History of observations ==
The variability of this system was initially suspected by B. A. Gould in 1879, then confirmed by A. W. Roberts in 1895. Roberts determined this to be an Algol-type variable with a period of 2.416 days. In his 1915 study of eclipsing binaries, H. Shapley listed a low orbital eccentricity of 0.091 for this binary system. He considered both eclipses to be partial, but only after correcting for limb darkening. R. S. Dugan and F. W. Wright in 1939 discovered evidence that suggested the period is varying.

R. L. Baglow in 1948 found an essentially circular orbit with a primary component of spectral class B5. By 1986, O. E. Ferrer and J. Sahade were able to extract spectral information about the secondary component, finding the system consists of ordinary main sequence stars of classes B5V and A2V. Hydrogen alpha emission lines suggested that the stars are interacting.

== Physical characteristics ==
RS Sagittarii has a very tight orbit; both stars are separated by 17.32 solar radii (0.0805 au; 12,050,000 km) and take roughly 2 days and 10 hours to complete an orbit around the center of mass. The system appears to be semidetached.

The secondary component is currently evolving away from the main sequence and expanding in size. It currently fills its roche lobe, having a teardrop shape. The roche lobe filling results in mass transfer to the primary star, which has an accretion disk and a hot spot at the impact location. Emission lines of hydrogen alpha is a consequence of the mass transfer.

The primary component of the system is the larger and more massive of the pair, having 8.846 times the mass of the Sun (M_{☉}) and 5.523 times the Sun's radius (R_{☉}), compared to 2.875 M_{☉} and 5.524 R_{☉} for the secondary member. The primary is radiating 3,700 times the Sun's luminosity from its photosphere at an effective temperature of 19,000 K. The cooler secondary is 9,680 K and radiates 195 times the luminosity of the Sun.

RS Sgr shares a common proper motion with the 9th-magnitude stars TYC-7400-1102-1 and HD 167669, and they would form a quadruple system. Any orbits would take hundreds of thousands of years. TYC-7400-1102-1 is an A1 main-sequence star with a mass around twice that of the Sun, while HD 167669 is a slightly brighter B9 main sequence star with a mass about three times the Sun's. HD 167669 itself has a close optical companion, but it appears to be much more distant. Together with RS Sgr, these stars have the Washington Double Star Catalog designation WDS J18176-3406.
