= V4024 Sagittarii =

Star in the constellation Sagittarius

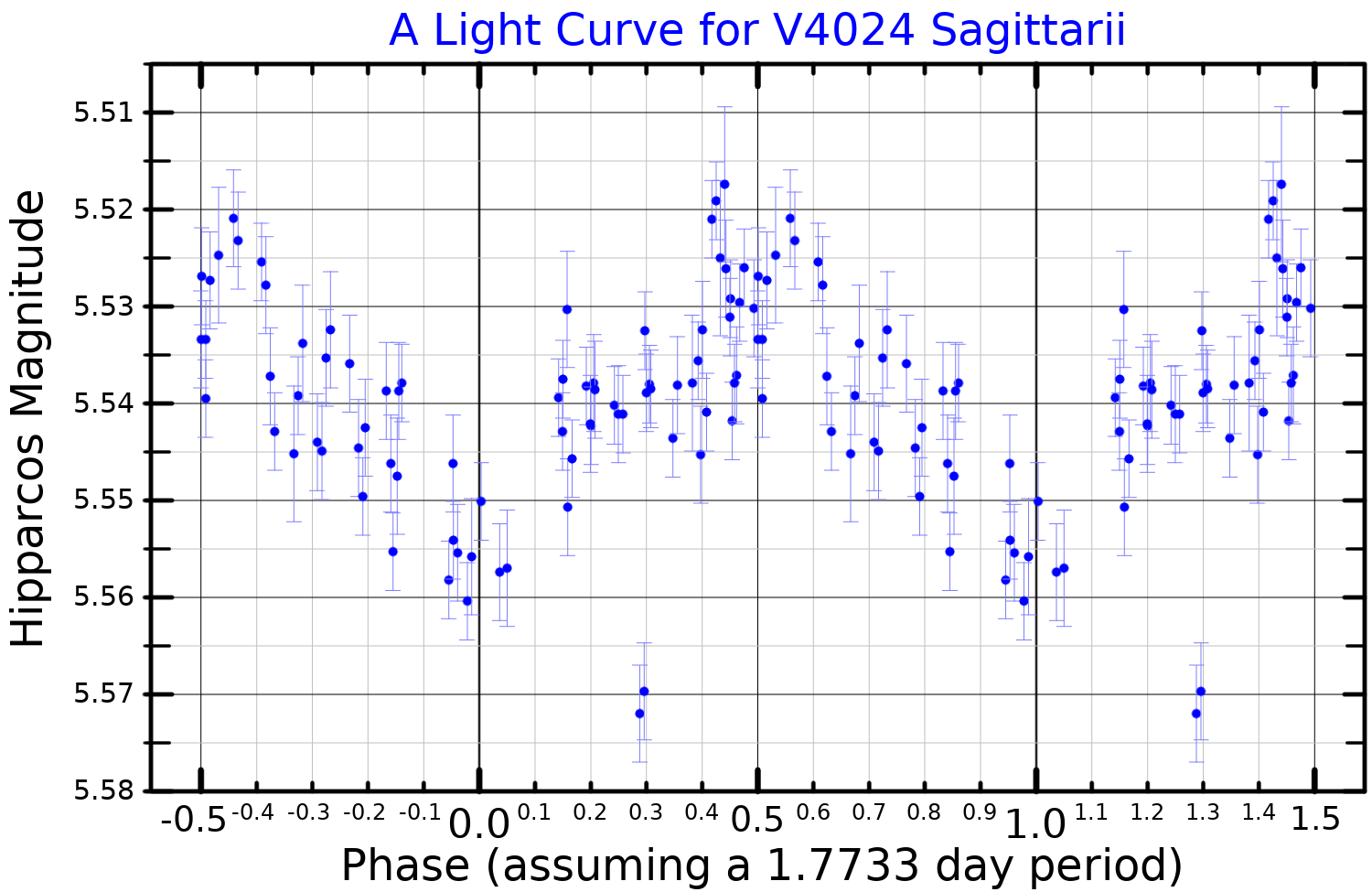
- A light curve for V4024 Sagittarii, plotted from Hipparcos data

Observation data Epoch J2000 Equinox ICRS
- Constellation: Sagittarius
- Right ascension: 19^{h} 08^{m} 16.70187^{s}
- Declination: −19° 17′ 25.0380″
- Apparent magnitude (V): 5.34 - 5.60

Characteristics
- Spectral type: B2Ve
- B−V color index: −0.06
- Variable type: γ Cas

Astrometry
Radial velocity (R_{v})	−20.3±2.9 km/s
Proper motion (μ)	RA: +6.240 mas/yr Dec.: −1.126 mas/yr
Parallax (π)	2.3734±0.1406 mas
Distance	1,370 ± 80 ly (420 ± 20 pc)
Absolute magnitude (M_{V})	−2.39

Details
Mass	8.8±0.6 M_{☉}
Radius	4.5 R_{☉}
Luminosity (bolometric)	7,551+1,119 −974 L_{☉}
Surface gravity (log g)	3.24±0.49 cgs
Temperature	18,100±500 K
Rotational velocity (v sin i)	105±10 km/s
Age	25.1±1.3 Myr

Other designations
- V4024 Sgr, BD−19°5312, HD 178175, HIP 93996, HR 7249, SAO 162229

Database references
SIMBAD	data

V4024 Sagittarii is a single variable star in the southern constellation of Sagittarius. It has a blue-white hue and is dimly visible to the naked eye with an apparent visual magnitude that fluctuates from about 5.3 to 5.6. The star is located at a distance of approximately 1,700 light years based on stellar parallax, but is drifting closer with a radial velocity of −20 km/s. The position of this star near the ecliptic means it is subject to lunar occultations.

This object is a massive Be star with a stellar classification of B2Ve. The 'e' suffix indicates the spectrum of the star displays emission lines, which are created by materials ejected from the equatorial region of this rapidly rotating star. While conducting a photometric study of cepheid variable stars during 1961 and 1962, Johanna Helena Walraven et al. used the star, then known as HD 178175, as a standard star and discovered that its brightness varies. It was given its variable star designation, V4024 Sagittarri, in 1978. It is classified as an eruptive Gamma Cassiopeiae variable and has been measured ranging in brightness from visual magnitude 5.34 down to 5.60. The star is an estimated 5 million years old with 8.8 times the mass of the Sun and about 4.5 times the Sun's radius. It is spinning with a projected rotational velocity of 105 m/s. V4024 Sagittarii is radiating 7,551 times the luminosity of the Sun from its photosphere at an effective temperature of 18,100 K. Koen and Eyer examined the Hipparcos data for this star, and found that its brightness varied with a period of 1.7733 days.
