= HD 167665 =

Star in the constellation Sagittarius

- Location of HD 167665 (circled in red)

Observation data Epoch J2000.0 Equinox ICRS
- Constellation: Sagittarius
- Right ascension: 18^{h} 17^{m} 23.759^{s}
- Declination: −28° 17′ 20.22″
- Apparent magnitude (V): 6.39

Characteristics

Main sequence
- Spectral type: F9V Fe−0.8 CH−0.4
- U−B color index: +0.00
- B−V color index: +0.52

Brown dwarf
- Spectral type: T4

Astrometry
Radial velocity (R_{v})	+8.41±0.23 km/s
Proper motion (μ)	RA: +133.261±0.094 mas/yr Dec.: −151.806±0.065 mas/yr
Parallax (π)	32.3999±0.0903 mas
Distance	100.7 ± 0.3 ly (30.86 ± 0.09 pc)
Absolute magnitude (M_{V})	+3.94

Orbit
Period (P)	12.134±0.014 yr
Semi-major axis (a)	5.604±0.050 AU
Eccentricity (e)	0.339±0.002
Inclination (i)	58.85°+0.74° −0.68°°
Longitude of the node (Ω)	217.84±0.46°
Periastron epoch (T)	2,448,065.856+16.941 −16.172
Argument of periastron (ω) (secondary)	43.94+0.45 −0.40°
Semi-amplitude (K_{1}) (primary)	0.611+0.003 −0.004 km/s

Details

A
Mass	1.11+0.03 −0.02 M_{☉}
Radius	1.32±0.02 R_{☉}
Luminosity	2.45 L_{☉}
Surface gravity (log g)	4.06±0.11 cgs
Temperature	6,050±74 K
Metallicity [Fe/H]	−0.14±0.05 dex
Rotational velocity (v sin i)	8 km/s
Age	6.20±1.13 Gyr

B
Mass	60.3±0.8 M_{Jup}
Radius	0.91+0.15 −0.11 R_{Jup}
Luminosity	(1.267±0.005)×10^{−5} L_{☉}
Surface gravity (log g)	5.26+0.12 −0.13 cgs
Temperature	1,127+75 −79 K

Other designations
- CD−28°14408, HD 167665, HIP 89620, HR 6836, SAO 186593

Database references
SIMBAD	data

HD 167665 is a yellow-white-hued star with a brown dwarf companion in the southern constellation of Sagittarius. With an apparent visual magnitude of 6.39, it is near the lower brightness limit for stars that are visible to the naked eye. Based upon an annual parallax shift of 32.4 mas as seen from Earth, it is located 101 light-years from the Sun. The star is moving away from the Sun with a radial velocity of +8 km/s.

This star has a stellar classification of F9V Fe−0.8 CH−0.4, which indicates this is an F-type main-sequence star with a spectrum that displays mild underabundances of iron and the CH molecule compared to normal stars of this temperature. It is a solar-type star with about the same mass as the Sun, but has a radius 32% greater. The star is older than the Sun with an estimated age of 6.7 billion years, and it is spinning with a projected rotational velocity of 8 km/s. HD 167665 is radiating 2.45 times the Sun's luminosity from its photosphere at an effective temperature of 6,080 K.

== Brown dwarf ==
Based upon regular variations in radial velocity observed between 1996 and 2006, an orbiting companion was announced by the California and Carnegie Planet Search program in 2007. This perturbing object, designated HD 167665 b, has an orbital period of twelve years with an eccentricity of 0.342. The semimajor axis of this orbit is 5.62 AU and the object has a mass of at least 50.3±0.4 M_{J}. Since the inclination of the orbit was initially unknown, the exact mass could not be determined, with a 79% chance that the mass of the object constrains it to be a brown dwarf with a mass less than 82 M_{J}.

In 2022, astrometric observations confirmed this object to be a brown dwarf, with a true mass of 52.708+5.112
−4.403 M_{J}. Its nearly edge-on inclination relative to Earth suggests a non-zero probability that it transits its star. The brown dwarf was directly imaged in 2024, with a refinement of the orbital elements. The derived orbital inclination of 59° rules out the possibility that it transits the star. The mass was determined to be 60.3±0.8 M_{J}.
