= HD 189245 =

Star in the constellation Sagittarius

Observation data Epoch J2000.0 Equinox J2000.0
- Constellation: Sagittarius
- Right ascension: 20^{h} 00^{m} 20.249^{s}
- Declination: −33° 42′ 12.42″
- Apparent magnitude (V): 5.66

Characteristics
- Evolutionary stage: main sequence
- Spectral type: F8.5 V Fe−0.6 CH−0.5
- U−B color index: −0.04
- B−V color index: +0.498

Astrometry
Radial velocity (R_{v})	−13.2 km/s
Proper motion (μ)	RA: +128.794 mas/yr Dec.: −289.360 mas/yr
Parallax (π)	45.1537±0.0551 mas
Distance	72.23 ± 0.09 ly (22.15 ± 0.03 pc)
Absolute magnitude (M_{V})	+4.01

Details
Mass	1.3 M_{☉}
Radius	1.2 R_{☉}
Luminosity	2.2 L_{☉}
Surface gravity (log g)	4.31 cgs
Temperature	6,333 K
Metallicity [Fe/H]	−0.09 dex
Rotational velocity (v sin i)	72.6 km/s
Age	100 or 500 Myr

Other designations
- 262 G. Sgr, CD−34°14082, GJ 773.4, GJ 9679, HD 189245, HIP 98470, HR 7631, SAO 211724

Database references
SIMBAD	data

HD 189245 is the Henry Draper catalogue designation for a solitary star in the southern constellation of Sagittarius. It has an apparent visual magnitude of 5.66, which means it is faintly visible to the naked eye. Parallax measurements from the Hipparcos satellite indicate a distance of 72 light years from the Sun. It is drifting closer with a heliocentric radial velocity of −13 km/s.

The stellar classification of this star is F8.5 V Fe−0.6 CH−0.5, indicating that it is an F-type main sequence star with a spectrum that shows deficiencies in iron (Fe) and methylidyne (CH) in its outer atmosphere. It is a variable star with an active chromosphere and is a source of X-ray emission. HD 189245 is spinning rapidly with a projected rotational velocity of 72.6 km/s. Gyrochronology indicates this is a young star with an estimated age of 500 million years. However, the amount of X-ray emission suggests an even younger star that is roughly 100 million years old.

The velocity components of HD 189245 indicate that it is a likely member of the AB Doradus moving group of stars, which share a common motion through space. This group has an age of around 50 million years and is centered at a point 98 ly (30 pc) from the Sun.
