= 14 Sagittarii =

Star in the constellation Sagittarius

Observation data Epoch J2000 Equinox ICRS
- Constellation: Sagittarius
- Right ascension: 18^{h} 14^{m} 15.89989^{s}
- Declination: −21° 42′ 47.3919″
- Apparent magnitude (V): 5.491

Characteristics
- Spectral type: K2 III
- B−V color index: 1.528±0.001

Astrometry
Radial velocity (R_{v})	−58.9±2.8 km/s
Proper motion (μ)	RA: −16.27 mas/yr Dec.: −23.49 mas/yr
Parallax (π)	7.20±0.41 mas
Distance	450 ± 30 ly (139 ± 8 pc)
Absolute magnitude (M_{V})	−0.21

Details
Luminosity	317.37 L_{☉}
Surface gravity (log g)	1.7 cgs
Temperature	3,940 K
Metallicity [Fe/H]	−0.26 dex

Other designations
- 14 Sgr, NSV 10393, BD−21° 4916, HD 167036, HIP 89369, HR 6816, SAO 186509

Database references
SIMBAD	data

14 Sagittarii is a single, orange-hued star in the southern zodiac constellation of Sagittarius. It is faintly visible to the naked eye under good seeing conditions, having an apparent visual magnitude of 5.49. Based upon an annual parallax shift of 7.20±0.41 mas, it is located some 450 light years away. The star is moving closer to the Sun with a heliocentric radial velocity of around −59 km/s. It should achieve perihelion in about two million years, approaching as close as 136.1 ly (41.72 pc).

This is an evolved giant star with a stellar classification of K2 III, having exhausted the supply of hydrogen at its core and moved off the main sequence. It is a suspected variable star, possibly of the micro-variable variety, having an amplitude of less than 0.03 in magnitude. 14 Sagittarii is radiating about 317 times the Sun's luminosity from its photosphere at an effective temperature of around 3,940 K.
