= Theta2 Sagittarii =

Star in the constellation Sagittarius

Theta^{2} Sagittarii
- Location of θ^{2} Sagittarii (circled)

Observation data Epoch J2000.0 Equinox J2000.0 (ICRS)
- Constellation: Sagittarius
- Right ascension: 19^{h} 59^{m} 51.35684^{s}
- Declination: −34° 41′ 52.0797″
- Apparent magnitude (V): +5.30

Characteristics
- Spectral type: A4/A5 IV
- U−B color index: +0.06
- B−V color index: +0.17

Astrometry
Radial velocity (R_{v})	−17.60 km/s
Proper motion (μ)	RA: +108.23 mas/yr Dec.: −69.51 mas/yr
Parallax (π)	20.62±0.28 mas
Distance	158 ± 2 ly (48.5 ± 0.7 pc)
Absolute magnitude (M_{V})	+1.87

Details
Mass	1.93 M_{☉}
Luminosity	14 L_{☉}
Surface gravity (log g)	4.07±0.14 cgs
Temperature	8,113±276 K
Rotational velocity (v sin i)	45.2±0.5 km/s
Age	809 Myr

Other designations
- θ^{2} Sgr, CPD−35°8701, HD 189118, HIP 98421, HR 7624, SAO 211717, WDS J19599-3442

Database references
SIMBAD	data

Theta^{2} Sagittarii, Latinized from θ^{2} Sagittarii, is a solitary star in the zodiac constellation of Sagittarius. It is faintly visible to the naked eye with an apparent visual magnitude of +5.30. The star is progressing in the general direction of the Sun with a radial velocity of −17.60 km/s. Based upon an annual parallax shift of 20.62 mas as seen from Earth, it is located around 158 light years from the Sun. The star is drifting closer with a radial velocity of −17.6 km/s.

The spectrum of Theta^{2} Sagittarii matches a stellar classification of A4/A5 IV, indicating that, at the estimated age of 809 million years, this is an evolving A-type subgiant star. It is a suspected Am star and may display photometric variability, at least during a 1992 observation period. The star has an estimated 1.93 times the mass of the Sun and is radiating 14 times the Sun's luminosity from its photosphere at an effective temperature of 8,113 K. It is spinning with a projected rotational velocity of 45.2 km/s.

Theta^{2} Sagittarii has a pair of visual companions. Component B is a magnitude 11.3 star at an angular separation of 32.8 arc seconds along a position angle of 165°, as of 2000. Component C lies at an angular separation of 1.5 arc seconds along a position angle of 104° from component B, as of 1965. Neither is physically associated with Theta^{2} Sagittarii itself.
