= 6 Sagittarii =

Star in the constellation Sagittarius

Observation data Epoch J2000 Equinox ICRS
- Constellation: Sagittarius
- Right ascension: 18^{h} 01^{m} 23.12190^{s}
- Declination: −17° 09′ 24.7302″
- Apparent magnitude (V): 6.27

Characteristics
- Spectral type: K2 III
- B−V color index: 1.763±0.010

Astrometry
Radial velocity (R_{v})	−22.0±4.3 km/s
Proper motion (μ)	RA: −0.86 mas/yr Dec.: −7.15 mas/yr
Parallax (π)	1.24±0.44 mas
Distance	approx. 2,600 ly (approx. 800 pc)

Details
Mass	10.6±1.9 M_{☉}
Luminosity	6,816.79 L_{☉}
Temperature	3,778 K
Age	25.1±3.8 Myr

Other designations
- 6 Sgr, BD−17° 4987, FK5 1470, HD 164358, HIP 88258, HR 6715, SAO 160998

Database references
SIMBAD	data

6 Sagittarii is a massive, orange-hued star in the southern zodiac constellation of Sagittarius. With an apparent visual magnitude of 6.27, it is just below the nominal brightness limit for visibility with the typical naked eye under ideal viewing conditions. The distance can be estimated from the annual parallax shift of 1.24±0.44 mas as roughly 2,600 light years away. It is moving closer to the Sun with a heliocentric radial velocity of −22 km/s. 6 Sagittarii has a peculiar velocity of 31.8+9.9
−14.1 km/s, which may indicate it is a runaway star.

This is an evolved giant star with a stellar classification of K2 III. It is only 25 million years old and has around ten times the mass of the Sun. The star is radiating about 6,817 times the Sun's luminosity from its photosphere at an effective temperature of 3,778 K. It appears to be a source of extended infrared excess, but this emission may be due to intervening cirrus.
