= 21 Sagittarii =

Binary star system in the constellation Sagittarius

- Location of 21 Sagittarii (circled)

Observation data Epoch J2000 Equinox ICRS
- Constellation: Sagittarius
- Right ascension: 18^{h} 25^{m} 21.04075^{s}
- Declination: −20° 32′ 30.0385″
- Apparent magnitude (V): 4.81 (5.03 + 7.43)

Characteristics
- Spectral type: K2II + A5:
- U−B color index: +0.93
- B−V color index: +1.30

Astrometry
Radial velocity (R_{v})	−11.80 km/s
Proper motion (μ)	RA: +8.46 mas/yr Dec.: −28.07 mas/yr
Parallax (π)	7.95±0.72 mas
Distance	410 ± 40 ly (130 ± 10 pc)
Absolute magnitude (M_{V})	−0.67

Details

21 Sgr A
Mass	7.9 M_{☉}
Luminosity	320 L_{☉}
Temperature	4,234 K
Rotational velocity (v sin i)	4.4 km/s

Other designations
- 21 Sgr, BD−20°5134, GC 25132, HD 169420, HIP 90289, HR 6896, SAO 186794, CCDM J18254-2033AB, WDS J18254-2033AB, GSC 06274-01663

Database references
SIMBAD	data

21 Sagittarii is a binary star system in the southern zodiac constellation of Sagittarius. It is visible to the naked eye as a faint point of light with a combined apparent visual magnitude of 4.81. The system is located approximately 410 light years away from the Sun based on parallax. It is moving closer to the Earth with a heliocentric radial velocity of −11.80 km/s.

As of 2008, the pair had an angular separation of 1.7″ along a position angle of 280°. The brighter member of the pair, designated component A, is a K-type bright giant with a stellar classification of K2II and visual magnitude 5.03. It has eight times the mass of the Sun and is radiating 320 times the Sun's luminosity from its photosphere at an effective temperature of 4,234 K Its companion, component B, is magnitude 7.43 with type reported as A5:, where the ':' indicates some uncertainty about the classification.

== In Fiction ==
The BBC science docu-drama "First Contact: An Alien Encounter" first shown in 2022 imagined how the world would react if it made contact with aliens. In the drama, an extra terrestrial artefact was said to originated from 21 Sagittarii.
