= HD 190056 =

Star in the constellation Sagittarius

Observation data Epoch J2000 Equinox ICRS
- Constellation: Sagittarius
- Right ascension: 20^{h} 04^{m} 19.59387^{s}
- Declination: −32° 03′ 22.6729″
- Apparent magnitude (V): 4.99

Characteristics
- Spectral type: K1III
- U−B color index: +1.18
- B−V color index: +1.21
- Variable type: suspected

Astrometry
Radial velocity (R_{v})	-11.80 km/s
Proper motion (μ)	RA: +45.07 mas/yr Dec.: -11.74 mas/yr
Parallax (π)	11.22±0.25 mas
Distance	291 ± 6 ly (89 ± 2 pc)
Absolute magnitude (M_{V})	0.24

Details
Mass	1.48 M_{☉}
Radius	19 R_{☉}
Luminosity	121 L_{☉}
Surface gravity (log g)	2.05 cgs
Temperature	4,467 K
Metallicity [Fe/H]	-0.53 dex
Rotational velocity (v sin i)	< 1.0 km/s

Other designations
- CD-32°15682, CCDM J20043-3203A, FK5 3606, GC 27811, HIP 98842, HR 7659, HD 190056, NSV 12746, SAO 211782, WDS J20043-3203A

Database references
SIMBAD	data

HD 190056 is a class K1III (orange giant) star in the constellation Sagittarius. Its apparent magnitude is 4.99 and it is approximately 291 light years away based on parallax.

It is a suspected variable, and the primary has one companion, B, with magnitude 12.7 and separation 54.4".
