= Iota Sagittarii =

Astrometric binary star in the constellation Sagittarius

ι Sagittarii
- Location of ι Sagittarii (circled)

Observation data Epoch J2000 Equinox ICRS
- Constellation: Sagittarius
- Right ascension: 19^{h} 55^{m} 15.69691^{s}
- Declination: −41° 52′ 05.8388″
- Apparent magnitude (V): +4.118

Characteristics
- Spectral type: K0 II-III
- U−B color index: +0.911
- B−V color index: +1.084

Astrometry
Radial velocity (R_{v})	+35.8 km/s
Proper motion (μ)	RA: +22.61 mas/yr Dec.: +51.40 mas/yr
Parallax (π)	17.94±0.21 mas
Distance	182 ± 2 ly (55.7 ± 0.7 pc)
Absolute magnitude (M_{V})	+0.39

Details
Mass	1.40 M_{☉}
Radius	15 R_{☉}
Luminosity	87 L_{☉}
Surface gravity (log g)	1.89 cgs
Temperature	4,594±41 K
Metallicity [Fe/H]	−0.26 dex
Age	4.74 Gyr

Other designations
- ι Sgr, CPD−42°8944, FK5 1520, HD 188114, HIP 98032, HR 7581, SAO 229927

Database references
SIMBAD	data

Iota Sagittarii (Iota Sgr, ι Sagittarii, ι Sgr) is a star in the zodiac constellation of Sagittarius. With an apparent visual magnitude of +4.118, it is bright enough to be viewed with the naked eye. Based upon an annual parallax shift of 17.94 mas as seen from Earth, this star is located 182 light-years from the Sun. It is moving away from the Earth with a radial velocity of +35.8 km/s.

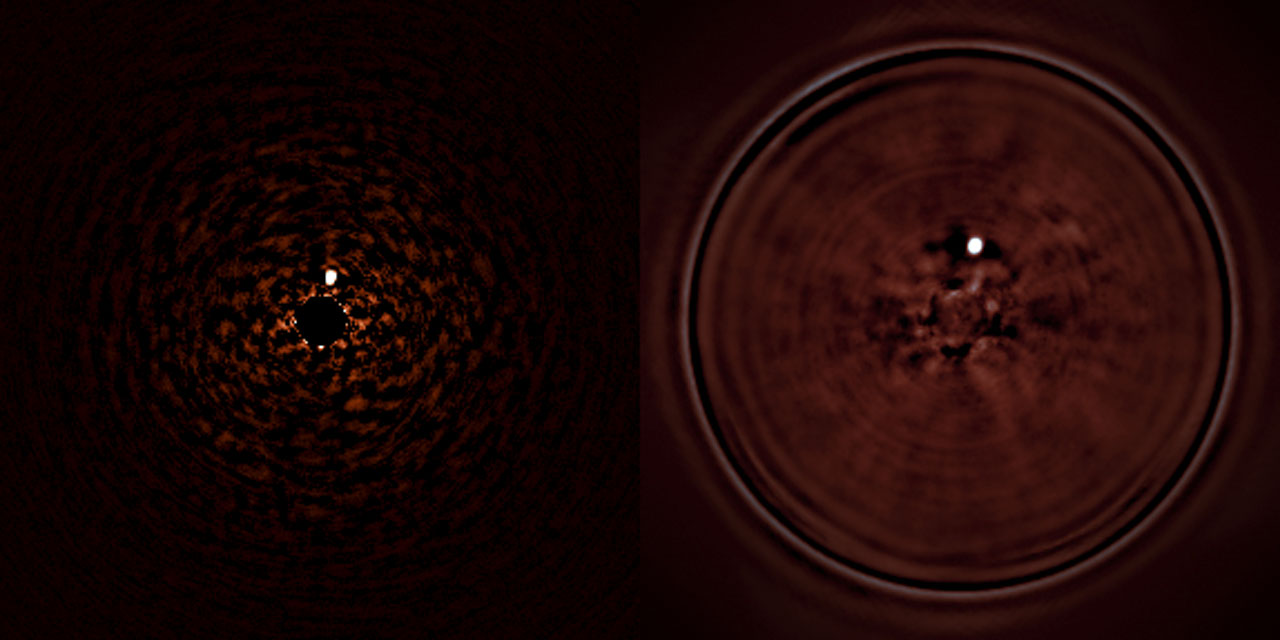
Two images of the companion star to Iota Sagittarii observed by SPHERE. The light of the primary star is blocked by a coronagraph.

This is an astrometric binary, based upon proper motion data collected during the Hipparcos mission. The primary component shows the spectrum of an evolved K-type giant or bright giant star with a stellar classification of K0 II-III. The measured angular diameter, after correction for limb darkening, is 2.32±0.02 mas. At an estimated distance of this star, this yields a physical size of about 15 times the radius of the Sun. It has 1.4 times the mass of the Sun and is radiating 87 times the Sun's luminosity from its enlarged photosphere at an effective temperature of about 4,594 K.

The companion star was directly observed for the first time in 2014 with the SPHERE instrument on the Very Large Telescope. It is separated from the primary star by 0.24″ and is more than 4,000 times fainter than it. This is an M-type red dwarf star with an estimated mass of 0.36 M_{☉}.
