= HD 189831 =

Star in the constellation Sagittarius

- Location of HD 189831 (circled in red)

Observation data Epoch J2000 Equinox ICRS
- Constellation: Sagittarius
- Right ascension: 20^{h} 03^{m} 33.45912^{s}
- Declination: −37° 56′ 26.5236″
- Apparent magnitude (V): 4.77

Characteristics
- Spectral type: K5III
- U−B color index: +1.68
- B−V color index: +1.41

Astrometry
Radial velocity (R_{v})	−38.30 km/s
Proper motion (μ)	RA: +64.47 mas/yr Dec.: −86.43 mas/yr
Parallax (π)	8.90±0.29 mas
Distance	370 ± 10 ly (112 ± 4 pc)
Absolute magnitude (M_{V})	−0.48

Details
Luminosity	316 L_{☉}
Temperature	4,099 K
Rotational velocity (v sin i)	< 1.0 km/s

Other designations
- CD−38°13828, FK5 3602, GC 27779, GSC 07947-03890, HIP 98761, HR 7652, HD 189831, SAO 211767

Database references
SIMBAD	data

HD 189831 is a class K5III (orange giant) star in the constellation Sagittarius. Its apparent magnitude is 4.77 and it is approximately 366 light years away based on parallax.
