= Theta1 Sagittarii =

Binary star system in the constellation Sagittarius

Theta^{1} Sagittarii
- Location of θ^{1} Sagittarii (circled)

Observation data Epoch J2000 Equinox J2000
- Constellation: Sagittarius
- Right ascension: 19^{h} 59^{m} 44.17834^{s}
- Declination: −35° 16′ 34.7049″
- Apparent magnitude (V): 4.37

Characteristics
- Spectral type: B3 IVp
- U−B color index: −0.67
- B−V color index: −0.15

Astrometry
Proper motion (μ)	RA: +5.60 mas/yr Dec.: −25.81 mas/yr
Parallax (π)	6.29±0.21 mas
Distance	520 ± 20 ly (159 ± 5 pc)
Absolute magnitude (M_{V})	−1.63

Orbit
Period (P)	2.1051 d
Eccentricity (e)	0.00
Periastron epoch (T)	2411140.645 JD
Argument of periastron (ω) (secondary)	0.00°
Semi-amplitude (K_{1}) (primary)	15.9 km/s

Details

θ^{1} Sgr A
Mass	6.6±0.1 M_{☉}
Radius	5.6 R_{☉}
Luminosity (bolometric)	2,271 L_{☉}
Temperature	17,900 K
Rotational velocity (v sin i)	73 km/s
Age	32.8±5.0 Myr

Other designations
- θ^{1} Sgr, CD−35°13831, HD 189103, HIP 98412, HR 7623, SAO 211716, WDS J19597-3517

Database references
SIMBAD	data

Theta^{1} Sagittarii (θ^{1} Sagittarii) is a close binary star system in the zodiac constellation of Sagittarius. It is visible to the naked eye with an apparent visual magnitude of 4.37. Based upon an annual parallax shift of 6.29 mas as seen from Earth, this star is located around 520 light years from the Sun. At that distance, the visual magnitude is diminished by an extinction factor of 0.24 due to interstellar dust.

This is a single-lined spectroscopic binary with an orbital period of just 2.1 days in a circular orbit. The visible member, component A, is a B-type peculiar subgiant star with a stellar classification of B3 IVp. It is around 33 million years old and is spinning with a projected rotational velocity of 73 km/s. The primary has 6.6 times the mass of the Sun and about 5.6 times the Sun's radius. It is radiating 2,271 times the solar luminosity from its photosphere at an effective temperature of 17,900 K.
