= 63 Ophiuchi =

Star in the constellation Sagittarius

Observation data Epoch J2000.0 Equinox ICRS
- Constellation: Sagittarius
- Right ascension: 17^{h} 54^{m} 54.04315^{s}
- Declination: −24° 53′ 13.5444″
- Apparent magnitude (V): 6.20

Characteristics
- Spectral type: O8II((f))
- U−B color index: –0.89
- B−V color index: +0.04

Astrometry
Radial velocity (R_{v})	–11 km/s
Proper motion (μ)	RA: +0.704 mas/yr Dec.: –2.194 mas/yr
Parallax (π)	0.9071±0.0882 mas
Distance	3,600 ± 300 ly (1,100 ± 100 pc)
Absolute magnitude (M_{V})	−5.14±0.22

Details
Mass	17±4 M_{☉} 29 M_{☉}
Radius	12.0±1.2 R_{☉}
Luminosity	11,500+820 −770 L_{☉}
Surface gravity (log g)	3.51±0.03 cgs
Temperature	35,000±300 K
Rotational velocity (v sin i)	48±5 km/s
Age	3.7 Myr

Other designations
- 63 Oph, CD−24°13615, HD 162978, HIP 87706, HR 6672, SAO 185928

Database references
SIMBAD	data

63 Ophiuchi is an O-type giant star in the constellation Sagittarius, despite its name. During a 2009 survey for companions of massive stars, it was observed using speckle interferometry but no companion was found. The small parallax measurement of 0.91±0.09 mas suggest that this extremely luminous star may be located about 3,600 light-years away. An estimate of the distance based on the strength of the Ca II line yields a more modest value of 2,605 ly (799 pc). The star lies only 0.3° north of the galactic plane.

In 1983, astronomers from the Sternberg Astronomical Institute in Moscow, Russia identified a faint, shell-shaped nebula surrounding the star that was being excited by the star's energy. Named Sharpless 22, this ring-shaped nebula has a double-shell structure with an inner envelope spanning 45–50′ (9–18 pc), surrounded by a diffuse envelope some 65–80′ (14–29 pc) across. At an estimated mass loss rate of (6–8) × 10^{−6} M_{☉}/yr, it would take the star about (1–5) × 10^{5} years to produce such a nebula from the outflow of its stellar wind.

In 2025 the star was found to have a weak magnetic field, which is unusual for giant stars. It is considered an example of an transitional object between main sequence strongly magnetic stars and magnetic supergiants like Alnitak.
