= Chi3 Sagittarii =

Star in the constellation Sagittarius

Chi^{3} Sagittarii
- Location of χ^{3} Sagittari (circled)

Observation data Epoch J2000.0 Equinox J2000.0 (ICRS)
- Constellation: Sagittarius
- Right ascension: 19^{h} 25^{m} 29.65949^{s}
- Declination: −23° 57′ 44.8390″
- Apparent magnitude (V): +5.448

Characteristics
- Spectral type: K3 III
- U−B color index: +1.662
- B−V color index: +1.443
- Variable type: suspected

Astrometry
Radial velocity (R_{v})	+39.6 km/s
Proper motion (μ)	RA: −18.66 mas/yr Dec.: −12.73 mas/yr
Parallax (π)	6.53±0.42 mas
Distance	500 ± 30 ly (153 ± 10 pc)
Absolute magnitude (M_{V})	−0.46

Details
Radius	37 R_{☉}
Luminosity	301 L_{☉}
Surface gravity (log g)	1.860 cgs
Temperature	4,040 K
Metallicity [Fe/H]	−0.10 dex

Other designations
- Chi^{3} Sgr, 49 Sgr, NSV 11992, CPD−24°6723, HD 182416, HIP 95503, HR 7363, SAO 188105

Database references
SIMBAD	data

Chi^{3} Sagittarii (χ^{3} Sagittarii) is a solitary, orange-hued star in the zodiac constellation of Sagittarius. It is faintly visible to the naked eye with an apparent visual magnitude of +5.45. Based upon an annual parallax shift of 6.53 mas as seen from Earth, it is located roughly 500 light years from the Sun. It is receding from the Earth with a radial velocity of 39.6 km/s.

This is an evolved, K-type giant star with a stellar classification of K3 III. It is a suspected optical variable star with a magnitude range of 5.42 to 5.46. At infrared wavelengths, it shows large amplitude variation with a period of 505 days. The star has expanded to about 37 times the Sun's radius and is radiating 301 times the solar luminosity from its photosphere at an effective temperature of 4,040 K.
