= 56 Sagittarii =

Star in the constellation Sagittarius

- Location of 56 Sagittarii (circled in red)

Observation data Epoch J2000 Equinox ICRS
- Constellation: Sagittarius
- Right ascension: 19^{h} 46^{m} 21.73912^{s}
- Declination: −19° 45′ 40.0132″
- Apparent magnitude (V): 4.87

Characteristics
- Evolutionary stage: horizontal branch
- Spectral type: K0+III
- U−B color index: +0.96
- B−V color index: +1.06

Astrometry
Radial velocity (R_{v})	+22.07 km/s
Proper motion (μ)	RA: −129.40 mas/yr Dec.: −90.55 mas/yr
Parallax (π)	15.71±0.23 mas
Distance	208 ± 3 ly (63.7 ± 0.9 pc)
Absolute magnitude (M_{V})	0.85

Details
Mass	1.77 M_{☉}
Radius	11 R_{☉}
Luminosity	58.97 L_{☉}
Surface gravity (log g)	2.58 cgs
Temperature	4,750 K
Metallicity [Fe/H]	−0.07 dex
Rotational velocity (v sin i)	1.9 km/s

Other designations
- f Sgr, 56 Sgr, BD−20°5698, GC 27349, HD 186648, HIP 97290, HR 7515, SAO 162964, GSC 06320-02845

Database references
SIMBAD	data

56 Sagittarii is a single star in the southern constellation of Sagittarius. It has the Bayer designation f Sagittarii, while 56 Sagittarii is the Flamsteed designation. This object is visible to the naked eye as a faint, orange-hued point of light with an apparent visual magnitude of 4.87. It is located approximately 208 light years away from the Sun based on parallax, and is drifting further away with a radial velocity of +22 km/s.

This is an aging giant star with a stellar classification of K0+III, having exhausted the supply of hydrogen at its core and expanded to 11 times the Sun's radius. It is a red clump giant, which means it is on the horizontal branch and is generating energy through helium fusion at its core. The star has 1.8 times the mass of the Sun and is radiating 59 times the Sun's luminosity from its enlarged photosphere at an effective temperature of 4,750 K.
