= Xi1 Sagittarii =

Star in the constellation Sagittarius

Xi^{1} Sagittarii
- Location of ξ^{1} Sagittarii (circled)

Observation data Epoch J2000.0 Equinox J2000.0 (ICRS)
- Constellation: Sagittarius
- Right ascension: 18^{h} 57^{m} 20.47670^{s}
- Declination: −20° 39′ 22.8539″
- Apparent magnitude (V): +5.06

Characteristics
- Spectral type: B9/A0 Ib
- U−B color index: −0.14
- B−V color index: +0.12

Astrometry
| Proper motion (μ) | RA: −1.46 mas/yr Dec.: −5.75 mas/yr |
| Parallax (π) | 1.58±0.26 mas |
| Distance | approx. 2,100 ly (approx. 600 pc) |
| Absolute magnitude (M_{V}) | −3.92 |

Details
| Mass | 7.8±0.1 M_{☉} |
| Radius | 15 R_{☉} |
| Luminosity | 2,753 L_{☉} |
| Surface gravity (log g) | 2.3 cgs |
| Temperature | 9,400 K |
| Metallicity [Fe/H] | −0.20 dex |
| Rotational velocity (v sin i) | 10 km/s |
| Age | 39.8±4.9 Myr |

Other designations
- ξ^{1} Sgr, 36 Sgr, BD−20°5339, HD 175687, HIP 93057, HR 7145, SAO 187498

Database references
| SIMBAD | data |

Xi^{1} Sagittarii (ξ^{1} Sagittarii) is a solitary, blue-white hued star in the zodiac constellation of Sagittarius. It is visible to the naked eye with an apparent visual magnitude of +5.06. Based upon a small annual parallax shift of 1.58 mas as seen from Earth, this system is located roughly 2,100 light years from the Sun.

This is a massive supergiant star with a stellar classification of B9/A0 Ib. With an estimated 7.8 times the mass of the Sun and an age of about 40 million years it has depleted the hydrogen at its core, causing it to expand to about 15 times the Sun's radius. It is radiating 2,753 times the Sun's luminosity from its photosphere at an effective temperature of about 9,400 K.
