= Rho2 Sagittarii =

Star in the constellation Sagittarius

Rho^{2} Sagittarii
- Location of ρ^{2} Sagittarii (circled)

Observation data Epoch J2000.0 Equinox J2000.0 (ICRS)
- Constellation: Sagittarius
- Right ascension: 19^{h} 21^{m} 50.89574^{s}
- Declination: −18° 18′ 30.1996″
- Apparent magnitude (V): +5.87

Characteristics
- Spectral type: K0 III
- B−V color index: +1.06

Astrometry
Radial velocity (R_{v})	−12.7±2.9 km/s
Proper motion (μ)	RA: +102.72 mas/yr Dec.: −93.20 mas/yr
Parallax (π)	9.82±0.40 mas
Distance	330 ± 10 ly (102 ± 4 pc)
Absolute magnitude (M_{V})	+0.80

Details
Luminosity	60.4 L_{☉}
Temperature	4,721 K

Other designations
- ρ^{2} Sgr, 45 Sgr, BD−18°5325, HD 181645, HIP 95188, HR 7344, SAO 162521

Database references
SIMBAD	data

Rho^{2} Sagittarii (ρ^{2} Sagittarii) is a star in the zodiac constellation of Sagittarius. With an apparent visual magnitude of +5.87, it is near the lower limit of stars that can be seen with the naked eye. Based upon an annual parallax shift of 9.82 mas as seen from Earth, it is located around 330 light years from the Sun.

This is an evolved K-type giant star with a stellar classification of K0 III. As a result of a 1997 lunar occultation, a companion star was discovered at an angular separation of 21 mas. It appears to be an A-type main sequence star with a class of around A5. This companion was not detected during prior occultations by the Moon.
