= HR 7703 =

Binary star system in the constellation of Sagittarius

- Location of HR 7703 (circled in red)

Observation data Epoch J2000 Equinox ICRS
- Constellation: Sagittarius
- A
- Right ascension: 20^{h} 11^{m} 11.93877^{s}
- Declination: −36° 06′ 04.3517″
- Apparent magnitude (V): 5.31
- B
- Right ascension: 20^{h} 11^{m} 12.80289^{s}
- Declination: −36° 06′ 32.1661″
- Apparent magnitude (V): 11.50

Characteristics
- Spectral type: K2.5 V + M4 V
- U−B color index: +0.43
- B−V color index: +0.85

Astrometry

A
Radial velocity (R_{v})	−129.27±0.12 km/s
Proper motion (μ)	RA: +456.99 mas/yr Dec.: −1574.64 mas/yr
Parallax (π)	166.3272±0.1065 mas
Distance	19.61 ± 0.01 ly (6.012 ± 0.004 pc)
Absolute magnitude (M_{V})	+6.53

B
Absolute magnitude (M_{V})	+12.7

Orbit
Period (P)	591+118 −84 yr
Semi-major axis (a)	11.6+1.6 −1.3" (69.7 AU (Note: Semi-major axis in AU = $\frac{semimajor\ axis\ in\ seconds}{parallax}\ {{=}}\ \frac{11.6}{0.1663272}$ = 69.7 AU; as the eccentricity is 0.75, the distance fluctuates between 25% and 175% of that, roughly from 17 AU to 122 AU.))
Eccentricity (e)	0.75±0.10
Inclination (i)	86.79+0.60 −0.86°
Longitude of the node (Ω)	294.4+1.8 −2.6°
Periastron epoch (T)	2213+111 −63
Argument of periastron (ω) (secondary)	66.2+13.0 −6.7°

Details

HR 7703 A
Mass	0.75±0.03 M_{☉}
Radius	0.697±0.005 R_{☉}
Luminosity	0.26 L_{☉}
Surface gravity (log g)	4.49±0.05 cgs
Temperature	4,854±83 K
Metallicity [Fe/H]	−0.63±0.06 dex
Rotation	45 days
Rotational velocity (v sin i)	1.8±0.2 km/s
Age	9.0±0.9 Gyr

HR 7703 B
Mass	0.207+0.046 −0.042 M_{☉}
Radius	0.28 R_{☉}
Luminosity	0.0009 L_{☉}

Other designations
- 279 G. Sgr, CD−36°13940, GJ 783, HD 191408, HIP 99461, HR 7703, SAO 211885, WDS J20112-3606, PLX 4782, IRAS 20079-3614, HJ 5173
- A: LFT 1529, LHS 486, LTT 7988
- B: LFT 1530, LHS 487, LTT 7989

Database references
SIMBAD	The system
- A
- B

HR 7703 (Gliese 783, 279 G. Sagittarii) is a binary star system in the constellation of Sagittarius. The brighter component has an apparent visual magnitude of 5.31, which means it is visible from suburban skies at night. The two stars are separated by an angle of 7.10″, which corresponds to an estimated semimajor axis of 56.30 AU for their orbit.

Based upon an annual parallax shift of 0.16625 arc seconds as measured by the Hipparcos satellite, this system is 19.62 light-years (6.015 parsecs) from Earth. It is approaching the Solar System at a velocity of approximately 129 kilometers per second. At this rate, it will make its closest approach in 41,100 years when it comes to within 6.7 light-years (2.05 parsecs) of the Sun.

The primary component is a K-type star with three-quarters the mass of the Sun. It is approximately 9 billion years old, and rotates once every 45 days. The secondary component is a smaller red dwarf with only one-fourth of the Sun's mass. The system has been listed as a suspected variable star.

This star system has been examined for an excess of radiation in the infrared. The presence of an infrared excess can be taken as an indication of a debris disk orbiting the star. However, no such excess was discovered around HR 7703. Radial velocity data collected over a period of 12 years was examined for signs of periodicity caused by a planet orbiting at a distance of 3–6 AU, but none was detected. A slight linear trend in the radial velocities of the primary is probably due to the companion star.

== See also ==
- List of nearest K-type stars
