= 4 Sagittarii =

Astrometric binary star in the constellation Sagittarius

- Location of 4 Sagittarii (circled)

Observation data Epoch J2000 Equinox ICRS
- Constellation: Sagittarius
- Right ascension: 17^{h} 59^{m} 47.55646^{s}
- Declination: −23° 48′ 58.0130″
- Apparent magnitude (V): 4.74

Characteristics
- Spectral type: B9V
- U−B color index: −0.03
- B−V color index: -0.05

Astrometry
Radial velocity (R_{v})	64.33±1.32 km/s
Proper motion (μ)	RA: −0.900 mas/yr Dec.: −51.149 mas/yr
Parallax (π)	7.9879±0.3689 mas
Distance	410 ± 20 ly (125 ± 6 pc)
Absolute magnitude (M_{V})	−0.77

Details
Mass	3.23 M_{☉}
Radius	5.53 (Note: Calculated, using the Stefan-Boltzmann law and the star's effective temperature and luminosity, with respect to the solar nominal effective temperature of 5,772 K: $$\sqrt{\biggl(\frac{5,772}{9,661}\biggr)^4 \cdot 240} = 5.53\ R_\odot.$$) R_{☉}
Luminosity	240 L_{☉}
Temperature	9,661 K
Rotational velocity (v sin i)	149 km/s

Other designations
- Tianyue, 4 Sgr, CD−23°13731, FK5 3430, GC 24483, HD 163955, HIP 88116, HR 6700, SAO 186061, GSC 06841-01403

Database references
SIMBAD	data

4 Sagittarii, also named Tianyue, is a suspected astrometric binary star system in the zodiac constellation of Sagittarius, located approximately 410 light-years away based on parallax. It is visible to the naked eye as a faint, blue-white hued star with an apparent visual magnitude of 4.74. The system is moving away from the Earth with a heliocentric radial velocity of +64 km/s.

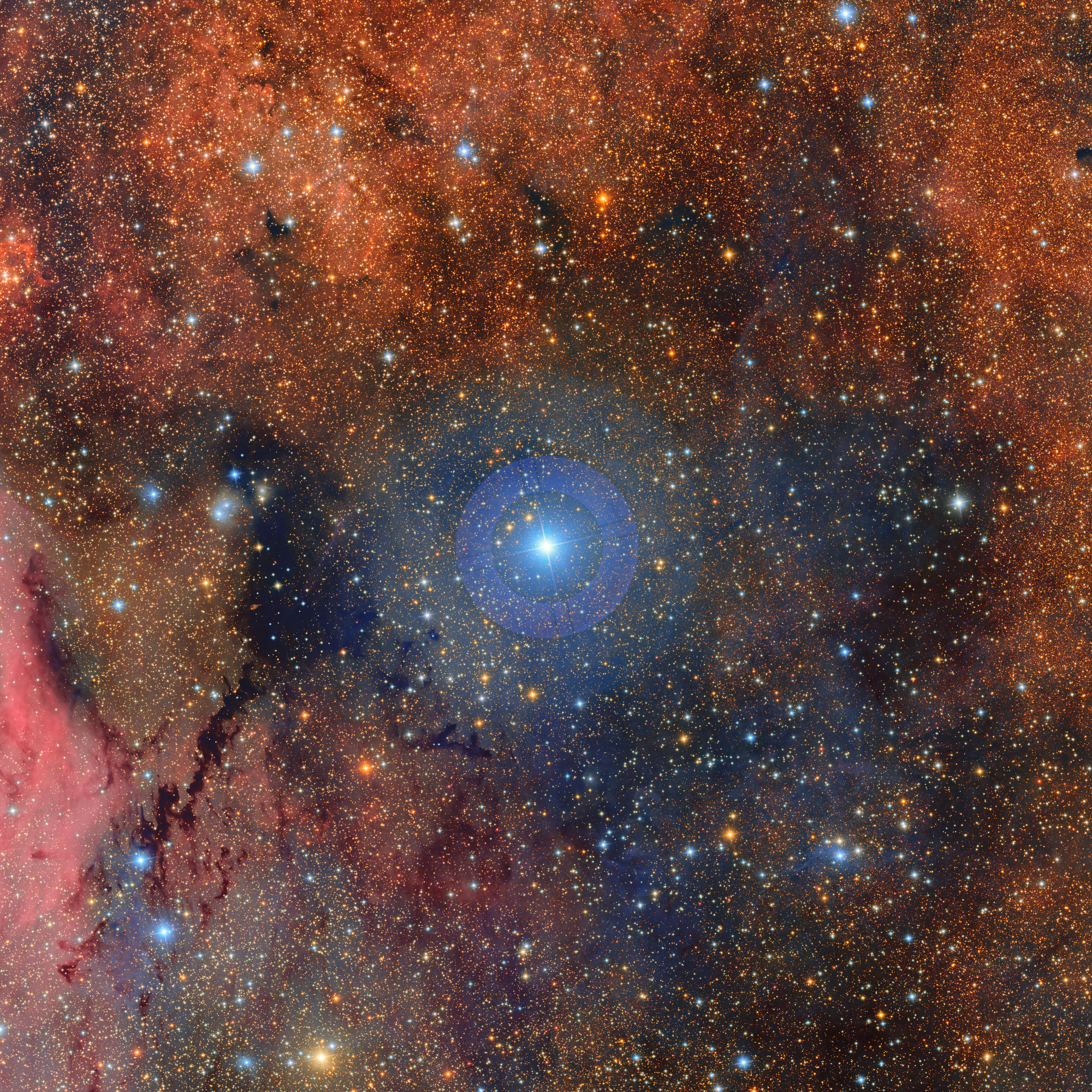
4 Sagittarii (center) imaged by the Vera C. Rubin Observatory

The visible component is a B-type main-sequence star with a stellar classification of B9 V. It has a high rate of spin, displaying a projected rotational velocity of 149 km/s. This is giving it an oblate shape with an equatorial bulge that is an estimated 14% larger than the polar radius. 4 Sagittarii has 3.23 times the mass of the Sun and is radiating 240 times the Sun's luminosity from its photosphere at an effective temperature of 9,661 K.

In Chinese astronomy, this star is part of the constellation Tiān Yuè (天籥, Celestial Keyhole). The IAU Working Group on Star Names adopted the name Tianyue for this star on 13 August 2026, after this Chinese constellation.
