= 52 Sagittarii =

Binary star system in the constellation Sagittarius

- Location of 52 Sagittarii (circled)

Observation data Epoch J2000 Equinox ICRS
- Constellation: Sagittarius
- Right ascension: 19^{h} 36^{m} 42.43288^{s}
- Declination: −24° 53′ 01.0288″
- Apparent magnitude (V): 4.59 + 9.2

Characteristics
- Evolutionary stage: main sequence
- Spectral type: B8/9V + K2–4V
- U−B color index: −0.15
- B−V color index: −0.06

Astrometry
Radial velocity (R_{v})	−19.00 km/s
Proper motion (μ)	RA: +68.30 mas/yr Dec.: −21.51 mas/yr
Parallax (π)	17.20±0.23 mas
Distance	190 ± 3 ly (58.1 ± 0.8 pc)
Absolute magnitude (M_{V})	0.77

Details

52 Sgr A
Mass	3.0±0.1 M_{☉}
Radius	2.1 R_{☉}
Luminosity	60.5+1.9 −1.8 L_{☉}
Surface gravity (log g)	4.19 cgs
Temperature	10,592+74 −72 K
Metallicity [Fe/H]	0.00 dex
Rotational velocity (v sin i)	48 km/s
Age	57.3±11.7 Myr

Other designations
- h^{2} Sgr, 52 Sgr, NSV 12191, CD−25°14184, GC 27089, HD 184707, HIP 96465, HR 7440, SAO 188337, CCDM J19367-2453AB, WDS J19367-2453AB, GSC 06893-02132

Database references
SIMBAD	data

52 Sagittarii is a binary star system in the southern constellation of Sagittarius. It has the Bayer designation h^{2} Sagittarii, while 52 Sagittarii is the Flamsteed designation. This system is visible to the naked eye as a faint, blue-white hued point of light with an apparent visual magnitude of 4.59. It is located approximately 190 light years away based on parallax, but is drifting closer with a radial velocity of −19 km/s.

The primary component is a B-type main-sequence star with a stellar classification of B8/9V. Garrison and Gray (1994) assigned it a class of kB8 hB9 HeA0 Va (Sr Fe II), displaying the calcium K line of a B8 class star, the hydrogen lines of a B9 star, and the helium lines of an A0 star, along with overabundances of strontium and iron. It is around 57 million years old with three times the mass of the Sun and about 2.1 times the Sun's radius. It is radiating 60.5 times the luminosity of the Sun from its photosphere at an effective temperature of 10,592 K. The star is spinning with a projected rotational velocity of 48 km/s.

52 Sagittarii has one companion at an angular separation of 2.4″. This object is magnitude 9.2 with a spectral class in the K2V-K4V range, and is believed to be the source of X-ray emissions from the system.
