= HD 172910 =

Class B2.5V star in the constellation Sagittarius

- Location of HD 172910 (circled)

Observation data Epoch J2000 Equinox ICRS
- Constellation: Sagittarius
- Right ascension: 18^{h} 44^{m} 19.35901^{s}
- Declination: −35° 38′ 31.1546″
- Apparent magnitude (V): 4.87

Characteristics
- Spectral type: B2.5V
- U−B color index: -0.72
- B−V color index: -0.18

Astrometry
Radial velocity (R_{v})	+3.90 km/s
Proper motion (μ)	RA: -0.68 mas/yr Dec.: -27.24 mas/yr
Parallax (π)	6.99±0.23 mas
Distance	470 ± 20 ly (143 ± 5 pc)
Absolute magnitude (M_{V})	-0.91

Details
Mass	7.2 M_{☉}
Luminosity	602 L_{☉}
Temperature	15,000 K
Metallicity [Fe/H]	+0.01 dex
Rotational velocity (v sin i)	65 km/s

Other designations
- CD-35°12876, CCDM J18443-3539A, FK5 3490, GC 25613, GSC 07419-03077, HIP 91918, HR 7029, HD 172910, SAO 210509, WDS J18443-3539A

Database references
SIMBAD	data

HD 172910 is a class B2.5V (blue main-sequence) star in the constellation Sagittarius. Its apparent magnitude is 4.87 and it is approximately 467 light years away based on parallax.

It has one companion, B, with magnitude 12.6 and separation 10.0".

In Chinese astronomy, HD 172910 is called 農丈人 (Pinyin: Nóngzhàngrén, lit. 'Peasant'), because this star is marking itself and stand alone in Peasant asterism, Dipper mansion (see : Chinese constellation).
