= Lunar station =

Segment of the Moon's orbit

Often called lunar mansion, (Note: The use of the English word “mansion”, though customary, is an overly literal translation of the Latin mansio, which means simply a stopover, a way station, even roadside lodging, but without any grandiose connotation.) a lunar station or lunar house is a segment of the ecliptic through which the Moon passes in its orbit around the Earth. The concept was used by several ancient cultures as part of their calendrical system.

== Stations in different cultures ==
In general, though not always, In different traditions, the sky is divided into 27 or 28 lunar mansions, corresponding approximately to the Moon’s 27.3-day sidereal orbit. (A sidereal month lasts about 27 1/3 days.) The Moon's position is charted with respect to those fixed segments. Lunar stations track the Moon’s position against the background of stars or along the zodiac; in some traditions, their positions can also be related to the annual cycle of the Sun and the seasons.

Various cultures developed systems of lunar stations, including the Jyotisha nakshatras of India, the Arabic manāzil al-qamar, and the Twenty-Eight Mansions of Chinese astronomy. Ancient Egyptian decans were a separate system of 36 stellar groups, and the 36 decans of Egyptian astronomy. Modern Western astrology generally does not use lunar mansions, although they were used in some historical Western and Arabic astrological traditions; in a 28-mansion system, each 30-degree zodiac sign contains parts of two or three mansions. The Chinese system groups the 28 lunar mansions into four groups associated with the four directions, seasons, and their corresponding celestial animals.

The concept of lunar stations is thought to originate in Babylonian astronomy. Tester (1987) explains that they appear in Hellenistic astrology in the 2nd-century list of fixed stars in the Katarchai by Maximus (Note: This Maximus is the poet and astrologer; not to be confounded with Maximus of Tyre.), the Arabic lists by Alchandri and Ibn Abī l-Rijāl, and a similar Coptic list with Greek names.

Tester believes that though they were known in the Vedic period of India, all lists "seem to betray" transmission through Greek sources. Though pointing out that the Babylonians had well established lunar groupings by the 6th century BC, he also notes that the 28 station "scheme was derived via Egyptian magic by the linking of the lists of lucky and unlucky days of the lunar month with the hemerologies and with the zodiac."

=== Somali 'god' ===
In traditional Somali astronomy and weather-lore, the lunar calendar was divided into 28 "stations of the moon" known as god, which were used to track weather and seasonal changes across the Somali Peninsula. According to Galaal, the Somali peninsula itself was traditionally divided into seven distinct weather districts, each with regional variations in the names and interpretation of these stations.

=== Chinese 宿 xiù ===
The 28 Lunar Mansions, or more precisely lodgings (Chinese: 二十八宿; pinyin: èrshí bā xiù) are the Chinese and East Asian form of the lunar stations. They can be considered as the equivalent to the Western zodiac, although the 28 stations reflect the movement of the Moon through a sidereal month rather than the Sun in a tropical year; (cf. Solar term). In their final form, they embodied the astral forms of the Four Symbols: two real and two legendary animals important in traditional Chinese culture, such as feng shui.

=== Indian nakshatra ===
The nakshatras (or more precisely nákṣatra, lit. "stars") are the Indian form of lunar stations. They usually number 27 but sometimes 28 and their names are related to the most prominent constellations in each sector. In modern practice they start from a point on the ecliptic precisely opposite the star Spica (Sanskrit: Chitrā) and develop eastwards but the oldest traditional method was to use the Vernal Equinox point as the starting point of Ashvini Nakshatra. In classical Hindu mythology, the creation of the nakshatras is attributed to Daksha. The nakshatras were wives of Chandra, the moon god. The nakshatras of traditional Hindu astronomy are based on a list of 28 asterisms found in the Atharvaveda (AVŚ 19.7) and also in the Shatapatha Brahmana. The first astronomical text that lists them is the Vedanga Jyotisha. The stations are important parts of Indian astrology.

List of 27 Nakshatras in Hindu Astrology
| No. | Name (Sanskrit) | Deity | Ruling Planet |
|---|---|---|---|
| 1 | Ashvini | Ashvins (twin horsemen gods) | Ketu |
| 2 | Bharani | Yama (god of death) | Venus |
| 3 | Krittika | Agni (fire god) | Sun |
| 4 | Rohini | Brahma | Moon |
| 5 | Mrigashira | Soma (Chandra/Moon god) | Mars |
| 6 | Ardra | Rudra (storm god) | Rahu |
| 7 | Punarvasu | Aditi (mother of gods) | Jupiter |
| 8 | Pushya | Brihaspati (guru of gods) | Saturn |
| 9 | Ashlesha | Naga (serpent deities) | Mercury |
| 10 | Magha | Pitrs (ancestors) | Ketu |
| 11 | Purva Phalguni | Bhaga (god of delight) | Venus |
| 12 | Uttara Phalguni | Aryaman (noble companion) | Sun |
| 13 | Hasta | Savitar (solar deity) | Moon |
| 14 | Chitra | Tvashtar (celestial architect) | Mars |
| 15 | Swati | Vayu (wind god) | Rahu |
| 16 | Vishakha | Indra and Agni | Jupiter |
| 17 | Anuradha | Mitra (god of friendship) | Saturn |
| 18 | Jyeshtha | Indra (king of gods) | Mercury |
| 19 | Mula | Nirriti (goddess of destruction) | Ketu |
| 20 | Purva Ashadha | Apah (water deities) | Venus |
| 21 | Uttara Ashadha | Vishvadevas (universal gods) | Sun |
| 22 | Shravana | Vishnu (preserver god) | Moon |
| 23 | Dhanishta | Eight Vasus | Mars |
| 24 | Shatabhisha | Varuna (god of cosmic waters) | Rahu |
| 25 | Purva Bhadrapada | Aja Ekapada (one-footed goat) | Jupiter |
| 26 | Uttara Bhadrapada | Ahir Budhnya (serpent of the deep) | Saturn |
| 27 | Revati | Pushan (protector of travelers) | Mercury |

=== Arabic manzil ===
In the traditional Arabic astrological system, the new moon was seen to move through 28 distinct manāzil (singular: manzil "house") during the normal solar year, each manzil lasting, therefore, for about 13 days. One or more manazil were then grouped into a nawaa (plural anwaa) which were tied to a given weather pattern. In other words, the yearly pattern was divided in the following manner: A year was divided into anwaa, each of which was made up of one more manazil, which were associated with a dominant star or constellation. These stars and constellations were sometimes, but not always, connected in some way to constellations in the Zodiac. Moreover, as the anwaa repeat on a regular, solar cycle, they can be correlated to fixed points on the Gregorian calendar.

The following table is a list of the 28 manāzil.

| Manzil | Meaning | Stars | Western constellation(s) | Begins on |
|---|---|---|---|---|
| ash-Sharatan (الشرطان) | The Two Signs | α Ari, β Ari (Sheratan) | Aries | 17 May |
| al-Butayn (البطين) | The Little Belly of the Lamb | 41 Ari, 39 Ari, 35 Ari (Note: Alternate identification: δ Ari (Botein), ε Ari, ρ Ari) | Aries | 31 May |
| ath-Thuraya (الثريا) | The Little Abundant One | Pleiades | Taurus | 13 June |
| ad-Dabaran (الدبران) | The Follower of Thuraya | Aldebaran | Taurus | 26 June |
| al-Haq’a (الهقعة) | The Hair Whorl | λ Ori, φ^{1} Ori, φ^{2} Ori | Orion | 9 July |
| al-Han’a (الهنعة) | The Neck Mark | γ Gem (Alhena), ξ Gem | Gemini | 22 July |
| adh-Dhira’a al-Mabsuta (الذراعة المبسوطة) | The Extended Forearm | Castor and Pollux | Gemini | 4 August |
| an-Nathra (النثرة) | The Tip of the Nose | M44, γ Cnc, δ Cnc | Cancer | 17 August |
| at-Tarf (الطرف) | The Eyes | λ Leo (Alterf), κ Cnc (Note: Probable original identification: ε Leo, ο Leo) | Leo | 30 August |
| al-Jabha (الجبهة) | The Forehead | Regulus, η Leo, γ Leo (Algieba), ζ Leo | Leo | 12 September |
| az-Zubra (الزبرة) | The Mane | δ Leo, θ Leo | Leo | 25 September |
| as-Sarfa (الصرفة) | The Weather Change | Denebola | Leo | 8 October |
| al-‘Awa’ (العواء) | The Howling Dogs | β Vir, η Vir, γ Vir, δ Vir, ε Vir | Virgo | 21 October |
| as-Simak al-A’zal (السماك الأعزل) | The Unarmed Sky-Raiser | Spica | Virgo | 3 November |
| al-Ghafr (الغفر) | The Concealment | ι Vir, κ Vir, λ Vir | Virgo | 16 November |
| az-Zubana (الزبانى) | The Two Claws of the Scorpion | β Lib, α Lib | Libra | 29 November |
| al-Iklil (الإكليل) | The Crown of the Scorpion | β Sco, δ Sco, π Sco | Scorpius | 12 December |
| al-Qalb (القلب) | The Heart of the Scorpion | Antares | Scorpius | 25 December |
| ash-Shawla (الشولة) | The Raised Tail | λ Sco (Shaula), υ Sco | Scorpius | 3 January |
| an-Na’a’im (النعائم) | The Ostriches | γ Sgr, η Sgr, ε Sgr, δ Sgr, λ Sgr, φ Sgr, ζ Sgr, τ Sgr, σ Sgr | Sagittarius | 16 January |
| al-Balda (البلدة) | The Wasteland | an empty region near π Sgr (Albaldah) | Sagittarius | 29 January |
| Sa’d adh-Dhabih (سعد الذابح) | The Auspice of the Slaughterer | α Cap, β Cap (Dabih) | Capricornus | 11 February |
| Sa’d Bul’ (سعد بلع) | The Voracious Auspice | ε Aqr (Albali), μ Aqr | Aquarius | 26 February |
| Sa’d as-Su’ud (سعد السعود) | The Auspice of Auspices | β Aqr (Sadalsuud), ξ Aqr | Aquarius | 11 March |
| Sa’d al-Akhbiya (سعد الأخبية) | The Auspice of Woolen Tents | γ Aqr (Sadachbia), π Aqr, ζ Aqr, η Aqr | Aquarius | 24 March |
| al-Fargh al-Awal (الفرغ الأول) | The First Spout | α Peg, β Peg | Pegasus | 6 April |
| al-Fargh ath-Thani (الفرغ الثاني) | The Second Spout | α And, γ Peg | Andromeda and Pegasus | 19 April |
| al-Hut (الحوت) | The Great Fish | β And, M31, ν And, μ And, υ Psc, φ Psc, χ Psc, ψ^{1} Psc, η And, ζ And, ε And, δ And, π And | Andromeda and Pisces | 2 May |

The dates above are approximate; notice that there are 2 days missing from a solar year in the table above.

==== More information ====
Lunar station - [Manazilu ʾl-Qamar منازل القمر] according to Islamic astronomical system (Arabic sources)
| Station | Period (approx. by Arabic sources) | Starting degree of Sidereal Zodiac sign | Constellation | ʿAmal عمل (lit. "doer"/ "doer of the deed") (The Angel ruling the Manazil and ḥurūf) | Lunar station [Manazilu ʾl-Qamar منازل القمر] | Arabic alphabet [ḥurūf حروف] - Abjadī Order | | | |
| Station | Period (approx. by Arabic sources) | Starting degree of Sidereal Zodiac sign | Constellation | ʿAmal عمل (lit. "doer"/ "doer of the deed") (The Angel ruling the Manazil and ḥurūf) | Lunar station [Manazilu ʾl-Qamar منازل القمر] | Transliteration | Letter Name | Letter Value (Abjad numerals) | Letter (Isolated Form) |
| 1st | 5 April | 0° 0' | Aries Arabic: بُرْجُ ﭐلْحَمَل, romanized: burjuʾl-Ḥamal | ʾIsrāfīl إِسْرَافِيل | ʾAsh-Sharaṭayn / ʾAn-Naṭḥ ﭐلْشَّرَطَيْن \ ﭐلْنّطح | ā / ’ (also ʾ ) | alif | 1 | أ |
| 2nd | 18 April | 12° 51' | Aries Arabic: بُرْجُ ﭐلْحَمَل, romanized: burjuʾl-Ḥamal | Jibrāʾīl جِبْرَائِيل | ʾAl-Buṭayn ﭐلْبُطَيْن | b | bāʾ | 2 | ب |
| 3rd | 1 May | 25° 43' | Aries Arabic: بُرْجُ ﭐلْحَمَل, romanized: burjuʾl-Ḥamal | Kalkāʾīl* كلكائيل | ʾAth-Thurayyā ﭐلْثُّرَيَّا | j (also ǧ, g) | jīm | 3 | ج |
| 4th | 14 May | 8° 34' | Taurus Arabic: بُرْجُ ﭐلْثُّور, romanized: burjuʾl-th-Thūr | Dardāʾīl* دردَائِيل | ʾAd-Dabarān ﭐلْدَّبَرَان | d | dāl | 4 | د |
| 5th | 27 May | 21° 26' | Taurus Arabic: بُرْجُ ﭐلْثُّور, romanized: burjuʾl-th-Thūr | Dūryāʾīl* دوريَائِيل | ʾAl-Haqʿah ﭐلْهَقْعَة | h | hāʾ | 5 | ه |
| 6th | 9 June | 4° 17' | Gemini Arabic: بُرْجُ ﭐلْجَوْزَاء, romanized: burju ʾl-Jawzā | Fatmāʾīl* فتمَائِيل | ʾAl-Hanʿah ﭐلْهَنْعَة | w / ū | wāw | 6 | و |
| 7th | 22 June | 17° 9' | Gemini Arabic: بُرْجُ ﭐلْجَوْزَاء, romanized: burju ʾl-Jawzā | Sharfāʾīl* شرفَائِيل | ʾAdh-Dhirāʿ ﭐلْذِّرَاعْ | z | zayn / zāy | 7 | ز |
| 8th | 5 July | 0° 0' | Cancer Arabic: بُرْجُ ﭐلْسَّرْطَان, romanized: burju ʾs-Sartan | Tankafīl* تنكفيل | ʾAn-Nathrah ﭐلْنَّثْرَة | ḥ | ḥāʾ | 8 | ح |
| 9th | 18 July | 12° 51' | Cancer Arabic: بُرْجُ ﭐلْسَّرْطَان, romanized: burju ʾs-Sartan | Hīsmāʾīl* هيسمائيل | ʾAṭ-Ṭarf / ʾAṭ-Ṭarfah ﭐلْطَّرْف \ ﭐلْطَّرْفَة | ṭ | ṭāʾ | 9 | ط |
| 10th | 31 July | 25° 43' | Cancer Arabic: بُرْجُ ﭐلْسَّرْطَان, romanized: burju ʾs-Sartan | Kīṭāʾīl* كيطَائِيل | ʾAl-Jab'hah ﭐلْجَبْهَة | y , ī / ā , ỳ | yāʾ / alif maqṣūrah | 10 | ي \ ى |
| 11th | 14 Aug | 8° 34' | Leo Arabic: بُرْجُ ﭐلْأَسَد, romanized: burju ʾl-Asad بُرْجُ ﭐلْأَسَد | Ḥarūzāʾīl* حروزَائِيل | ʾAz-Zubrah / ʾAl-Kharātān ﭐلْزُّبْرَة \ ﭐلْخرَاتَان | k | kāf | 20 | ك |
| 12th | 27 Aug | 21° 26' | Leo Arabic: بُرْجُ ﭐلْأَسَد, romanized: burju ʾl-Asad بُرْجُ ﭐلْأَسَد | Ṭāṭāʾīl* طَاطَائِيل | ʾAṣ-Ṣarfah ﭐلْصَّرْفَة | l | lām | 30 | ل |
| 13th | 9 September | 4° 17' | Virgo Arabic: بُرْجُ العَذْراء, romanized: burju aleadhra' | Rūmāʾīl* رومَائِيل | ʾAl-ʿAwwāʾ ﭐلْعَوَّاء | m | mīm | 40 | م |
| 14th | 22 September | 17° 9' | Virgo Arabic: بُرْجُ العَذْراء, romanized: burju aleadhra' | Ḥūlāʾīl* حولَائِيل | ʾAs-Simāk / ʾAs-Simāku ʾl-Aʿzil ﭐلْسِّمَاك \ ﭐلْسِّمَاكُ ﭐلأَعْزِل | n | nūn | 50 | ن |
| 15th | 5 October | 0° 0' | Libra Arabic: بُرْجُ ﭐلْمِيزَان, romanized: burju ʾl-Mīzān | Hamrākīl* همرَاكيل | ʾAl-Ghafr ﭐلْغَفْر | s | sīn | 60 | س |
| 16th | 18 October | 12° 51' | Libra Arabic: بُرْجُ ﭐلْمِيزَان, romanized: burju ʾl-Mīzān | Lūmāʾīl* لومَائِيل | ʾAz-Zubānā ﭐلْزُّبَانَى | ‘ (also ʿ ) | ayn | 70 | ع |
| 17th | 31 October | 25° 43' | Libra Arabic: بُرْجُ ﭐلْمِيزَان, romanized: burju ʾl-Mīzān | Sarhamākīl* سرهمَاكيل | ʾAl-Iklīl / ʾAl-Iklīlu ʾl-Jab'hah ﭐلْإِكْلِيل \ ﭐلْإِكْلِيلُ ﭐلْجَبْهَة | f | fā | 80 | ف |
| 18th | 13 November | 8° 34' | Scorpio Arabic: بُرْجُ ﭐلْعَقْرَب, romanized: burju ʾl-ʿAqrab | ʾAhjamāʾīl* / ʾUhjamāʾīl* اهجمَائِيل | ʾAl-Qalb ﭐلْقَلْب | ṣ | ṣād | 90 | ص |
| 19th | 26 November | 21° 26' | Scorpio Arabic: بُرْجُ ﭐلْعَقْرَب, romanized: burju ʾl-ʿAqrab | ʿAṭrāʾīl* / ʿUṭrāʾīl* عطرَائِيل | ʾAsh-Shawlah ﭐلْشَّوْلَة | q | qāf | 100 | ق |
| 20th | 9 December | 4° 17' | Sagittarius Burju ʾl-Qaws Arabic: بُرْجُ ﭐلْقَوْس, romanized: burju ʿl-Qaws | ʾAmwākīl* / ʾUmwākīl* امواكيل | ʾAn-Naʿāʾam ﭐلْنَّعَائَم | r | rāʾ | 200 | ر |
| 21st | 22 December | 17° 9' | Sagittarius Burju ʾl-Qaws Arabic: بُرْجُ ﭐلْقَوْس, romanized: burju ʿl-Qaws | Hamrāʾīl* همرَائِيل | ʾAl-Baldah ﭐلْبَلْدَة | sh (also š) | shīn | 300 | ش |
| 22nd | 4 January | 0° 0' | Capricorn Arabic: بُرْجُ ﭐلْجِدِّي, romanized: burju ʾl-Jiddỳ | ʿAzrāʾīl عَزْرَائِيل | Saʿdu ʾdh-Dhābiḥ / ʾAdh-Dhābiḥ سَعْدُ ﭐلْذَّابِح \ ﭐلْذَّابِح | t | tāʾ | 400 | ت |
| 23rd | 17 January | 12° 51' | Capricorn Arabic: بُرْجُ ﭐلْجِدِّي, romanized: burju ʾl-Jiddỳ | Mīkāʾīl مِيكَائِيل | Saʿdu ʾl-Bulʿa / ʾAl-Bulʿa سَعْدُ ﭐلْبُلْعَ \ ﭐلْبُلْعَ | th (also ṯ) | thāʾ | 500 | ث |
| 24th | 30 January | 25° 43' | Capricorn Arabic: بُرْجُ ﭐلْجِدِّي, romanized: burju ʾl-Jiddỳ | Mahkāʾīl* مهكَائِيل | Saʿdu ʾs-Suʿud / ʾAs-Suʿud سَعْدُ ﭐلْسُّعُود \ ﭐلْسُّعُود | kh (also ḫ, ḵ) | khāʾ | 600 | خ |
| 25th | 12 February | 8° 34' | Aquarius Arabic: بُرْجُ ﭐلْدَّلُو, romanized: burju ʾd-Dalū | ʾAhrāfīl* / ʾUhrāfīl* اهرَافِيل | Saʿdu ʾl-ʾAkhbiyyah / ʾAl-ʾAkhbiyyah سَعْدُ ﭐلْأَخْبِيَّه \ ﭐلْأَخْبِيَّه | dh (also ḏ) | dhāl | 700 | ذ |
| 26th | 25 February | 21° 26' | Aquarius Arabic: بُرْجُ ﭐلْدَّلُو, romanized: burju ʾd-Dalū | ʿAṭkāʾīl* / ʿUṭkāʾīl* عطكَائِيل | Farghu ʾd-Dalū ʾl-Muqdim / ʾAl-Muqdim فَرْغُ ﭐلْدَّلُو ﭐلْمُقْدِم \ ﭐلْمُقْدِم | ḍ | ḍād | 800 | ض |
| 27th | 10 March | 4° 17' | Pisces Arabic: بُرْجُ ﭐلْحُوت, romanized: burju ʾl-Ḥūt | Tūrāʾīl* تورَائِيل | Farghu ʾd-Dalū ʾl-Muʾkhar / ʾAl-Muʾkhar فَرْغُ ﭐلْدَّلُو ﭐلْمُؤْخَر \ ﭐلْمُؤْخَر | ẓ | ẓāʾ | 900 | ظ |
| 28th | 23 March | 17° 9' | Pisces Arabic: بُرْجُ ﭐلْحُوت, romanized: burju ʾl-Ḥūt | Lūkhāʾīl* لوخَائِيل | ʾAr-Rashāʾ / Buṭnu ʾl-Ḥūt ﭐلْرَّشَاء \ بَطْنُ ﭐلْحُوت | gh (also ġ, ḡ) | ghayn | 1000 | غ |

Also, the following letters has no alphabetical value in numerology of the Abjad system known as "Ilm ul-ʾAdad".

Arabic alphabet [ḥurūf حروف] - Abjadī Order
| Transliteration | Letter Name | Letter Name in Arabic script | Letter Value (Abjad numerals) | Letter (Isolated Form) |
| ’ (also ʾ / ʔ) | hamzah | همزة | 0 | ء |
| ah or at / ^{ah} / aẗ | tāʼ marbūṭah | تاء مربوطة | 0 | ة |

Notes of the table above in accordance to strict traditional Arab Islamic astronomy and theology:

(1) the Arabic alphabet resonates the alphabetical value in numerology of the Abjad system known as "Ilm ul-ʾAdad".

(2) the ʿAmal (Islamic view of angels, equivalent to rank of the "Watcher" or "Guardian Angel") is the Angel that rules the corresponding Arabic alphabet (rhythm of the alphabet in numerology of the Abjad system), manazilu-l-qamar (lunar houses) and constellations (i.e. zodiac signs). Generally speaking, the four Archangels in Islam ace Jibrāʼīl, Mīkāʼīl, ʼIsrāfīl and Malaku-l-Maut (ʿAzrāʼīl).

(3) the alphabetical orders follows the sequence of the original abjadī order (أَبْجَدِي), used for lettering, derives from the order of the Phoenician alphabet, and is therefore similar to the order of other Phoenician-derived alphabets, such as the Hebrew alphabet. In this order, letters are also used as numbers, Abjad numerals, and possess the same alphanumeric code/cipher as Hebrew gematria and Greek isopsephy.

(4) those angel name with an "asterisk" needs source citation upon Arabic transliteration but the given is the closest pronunciation based upon uttering the consonants.

A few of the numerical values are different in the alternative Abjad order. For four Persian letters these values are used:

| Transliteration | Letter Name | Letter Name in Persian | Letter Value | Letter (Isolation Form) |
|---|---|---|---|---|
| p | pe [Voiceless bilabial stop p] | په | 2 | پ |
| č / ch | če / che [Voiceless palato-alveolar affricate t͡ʃ] | چه | 3 | چ |
| ž / zh | že / zhe [Voiced palato-alveolar sibilant ʒ] | ژه | 7 | ژ |
| g | gāf [Voiced velar stop ɡ] | گاف | 20 | گ |

== See also ==
- Astrotheology
