= Kappa Aquarii =

Star in the constellation Aquarius

κ Aquarii
- Location of κ Aquarii (circled)

Observation data Epoch J2000 Equinox J2000
- Constellation: Aquarius
- Right ascension: 22^{h} 37^{m} 45.381^{s}
- Declination: −04° 13′ 41.00″
- Apparent magnitude (V): 5.030±0.009

Characteristics
- Spectral type: K1.5 IIIb CN0.5
- U−B color index: +1.16
- B−V color index: +1.142

Astrometry
Radial velocity (R_{v})	+7.31±0.16 km/s
Proper motion (μ)	RA: −69.411 mas/yr Dec.: −119.631 mas/yr
Parallax (π)	14.7149±0.0995 mas
Distance	222 ± 1 ly (68.0 ± 0.5 pc)
Absolute magnitude (M_{V})	+0.96

Details
Mass	2.554±0.128 M_{☉}
Radius	13 R_{☉}
Luminosity	60 L_{☉}
Surface gravity (log g)	2.63±0.08 cgs
Temperature	4,581±5 K
Metallicity [Fe/H]	+0.14±0.04 dex
Rotational velocity (v sin i)	3.8 km/s

Other designations
- Situla, 63 Aquarii, BD−04 5716, FK5 1595, GC 31581, HD 214376, HIP 111710, HR 8610, SAO 146210, PPM 206585, WDS J22378-0414A

Database references
SIMBAD	data

Kappa Aquarii is a candidate binary star in the equatorial constellation of Aquarius. Its identifier is a Bayer designation that is Latinized from κ Aquarii, and abbreviated Kappa Aqr or κ Aqr, respectively. This system is visible to the naked eye, but it is faint at an apparent visual magnitude of 5.03. Based upon parallax measurements, it is around 214 light-years (66 parsecs) from the Sun. The system is drifting further away from the Sun with a radial velocity of +7.3 km/s.

The two components are designated Kappa Aquarii A and B. The former is named Situla, pronounced /ˈsɪtjuːlə/, the traditional name for the system.

== Nomenclature ==
κ Aquarii (Latinised to Kappa Aquarii) is the system's Bayer designation. The designations of the two components as Kappa Aquarii A and B derive from the convention used by the Washington Multiplicity Catalog (WMC) for multiple star systems, and adopted by the International Astronomical Union (IAU).

It bore the traditional name Situla, a Latin word meaning "bucket" or "water jar". In 2016, the International Astronomical Union organized a Working Group on Star Names (WGSN) to catalogue and standardize proper names for stars. The WGSN decided to attribute proper names to individual stars rather than entire multiple systems. It approved the name Situla for the component Kappa Aquarii A on 12 September 2016 and it is now so included in the List of IAU-approved Star Names.

In Chinese, 虛梁 (Xū Liáng), meaning Temple, refers to an asterism consisting of Kappa Aquarii, 44 Aquarii, 51 Aquarii and HD 216718. Consequently, the Chinese name for Kappa Aquarii itself is 虛梁三 (Xū Liáng sān, English: the Third Star of Temple). From this Chinese name, the name Heu Leang has appeared, meaning "the empty bridge".

== Properties ==
Kappa Aquarii is most probably a wide binary star system. The brighter component is a giant star with a stellar classification of K1.5 IIIb CN0.5. It has exhausted the supply of hydrogen at its core and has expanded to 13 times the radius of the Sun. It is radiating 60 times the Sun's luminosity from its photosphere at an effective temperature of 4,581 K, giving it the orange-hued glow of a K-type star.

The fainter companion star is located at an angular separation of 98.3 arcseconds and has an apparent magnitude of 8.8.

== In culture ==
Endymion, an 1818 poem by John Keats, describes the star in its form as a water urn thus:

Crystalline brother of the belt of heaven,
Aquarius! to whom King Jove has given
Two liquid pulse streams 'stead of feather'd wings,
Two fan-like fountains, — thine illuminings.

USS Situla (AK-140) was a United States Navy Crater-class cargo ship named after the star.
