= HD 206610 b =

Gas giant exoplanet in Aquarius constellation

HD 206610 b / Naron
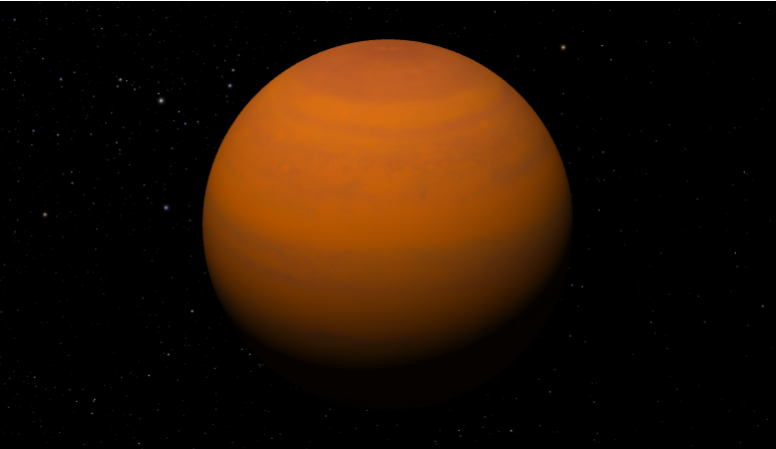

Discovery
- Discovered by: Johnson et al.
- Discovery site: Keck Observatory
- Discovery date: 2010
- Detection method: Doppler spectroscopy

Orbital characteristics
- Semi-major axis: 1.74±0.33 AU
- Eccentricity: 0.100±0.042
- Orbital period (sidereal): 673.2±3.3 d
- Time of perihelion: 2454724±34 JD
- Argument of perihelion: 334±16 º
- Semi-amplitude: 35.4±1.0 m/s
- Star: HD 206610

Physical characteristics
- Mass: ≥2.036±0.065 M_{J}

HD 206610 b is an extrasolar planet orbiting the K-type star Bosona (HD 206610) approximately 633 light years away in the constellation Aquarius.

The planet HD 206610 b is named Naron. The name was selected in the NameExoWorlds campaigns by Bosnia and Herzegovina during the 100th anniversary of the IAU. Naron is one of the names given to the Neretva river in Herzegovina originating with the Celts who called it Nera Etwa which means the Flowing Divinity. The host star HD 206610 is called Bosona. Bosona is the name given to the territory of Bosnia in the 10th century.

== Planetary system ==
HD 206610 is a planetary system which has one known planet, HD 206610 b or Naron, discovered in 2010 using the radial velocity method.

== See also ==
- HD 4313 b
- HD 136418 b
- HD 180902 b
- HD 181342 b
- HD 212771 b
