= M73 =

M73 or M-73 may refer to:

- M73 machine gun, an American belt-fed machine gun
- M-73 (Michigan highway), a state highway in Michigan
- M73 motorway, a motorway in Scotland
- BMW M73, a 1993 V12 piston engine
- Messier 73, a random grouping of stars in the constellation Aquarius
