= Belel =

Belel may refer to:

- Belel, Cameroon
- Belel, Nigeria
- HD 181342, a red giant star
