= HD 181342 b =

Exoplanet orbiting the star HD 181342 in the constellation Saggitarius

HD 181342 b / Dopere
Discovery
- Discovered by: Johnson et al.
- Discovery site: Keck Observatory
- Discovery date: 2010
- Detection method: Doppler spectroscopy

Orbital characteristics
- Semi-major axis: 1.592±0.091 AU
- Eccentricity: 0.022±0.051
- Orbital period (sidereal): 564.1±4.1 d
- Time of perihelion: 2461090±220 JD
- Argument of perihelion: 290±110 º
- Semi-amplitude: 44.1±3.3 m/s
- Star: HD 181342

Physical characteristics
- Mass: ≥2.54±0.19 M_{J}

HD 181342 b is an extrasolar planet orbiting the K-type star HD 181342 approximately 394 light years away in the constellation Sagittarius.

The planet HD 181342 b is named Dopere. The name was selected in the NameExoWorlds campaign by Senegal, during the 100th anniversary of the IAU. Dopere is an expansive historical area in the north of Senegal where Belel (name of HD 181342) was located.

== See also ==
- HD 4313 b
- HD 206610 b
- HD 180902 b
- HD 136418 b
- HD 212771 b
