= HD 4313 b =

Extrasolar planet in the constellation Pisces

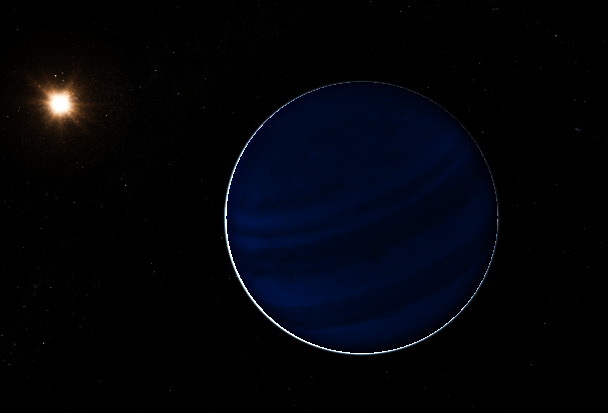
- An artist's impression of HD 4313 b orbiting its parent star.

Discovery
- Discovered by: Johnson et al.
- Discovery site: Keck Observatory
- Discovery date: 2010-03-17
- Detection method: Doppler spectroscopy

Orbital characteristics
- Semi-major axis: 1.157±0.097 AU
- Eccentricity: 0.147±0.047
- Orbital period (sidereal): 356.21±0.88 d
- Time of perihelion: 2454816±12 JD
- Argument of perihelion: 102±13 º
- Semi-amplitude: 40.3±1.7 m/s
- Star: HD 4313

Physical characteristics
- Mean radius: ~1.2 R_{J}
- Mass: ≥1.927±0.090 M_{J}
- Surface gravity: 69.25 m/s^{2}
- Temperature: 479.9 K (206.8 °C; 404.1 °F)

HD 4313 b is an extrasolar planet orbiting the K-type star HD 4313 approximately 447 light years away in the constellation Pisces. This planet was discovered using the Doppler spectroscopy (radial velocity) method.

== Discovery ==
HD 4313 was discovered by a group of scientist at the Keck Observatory on March 17, 2010 using the Doppler spectroscopy method, which is detecting a planet by the star's change in wobbling.

== Properties ==
=== Orbit ===
HD 4313 has an orbital period similar to Earth, with an orbit of approximately, 356 days. Its orbit distance is similar, about 1 AU away from its host star. According to the latest data, this planet has a somewhat eccentric orbit.

=== Physical characteristics ===
HD 4313 has a mass only 92.7% greater than that of Jupiter, but its radius and inclination is unknown, so the true mass and radius can't be studied. A best estimate of the radius is 1.2 times that of Jupiter.

== See also ==
- HD 181342 b
- HD 206610 b
- HD 180902 b
- HD 136418 b
- HD 212771 b
