= HD 180902 b =

Extrasolar planet orbiting the star HD 180902

Discovery
- Discovered by: Johnson et al.
- Discovery site: Keck Observatory
- Discovery date: 2010
- Detection method: Doppler spectroscopy

Orbital characteristics
- Semi-major axis: 1.40±0.11 AU
- Eccentricity: 0.107±0.022
- Orbital period (sidereal): 510.9±1.5 d
- Time of perihelion: 2455055±17 JD
- Argument of perihelion: 181±12 º
- Semi-amplitude: 34.25±0.84 m/s
- Star: HD 180902

Physical characteristics
- Mean radius: 1.221 R_{J}
- Mass: ≥1.685±0.041 M_{J}

HD 180902 b is an extrasolar planet orbiting the K-type star HD 180902 approximately 342 light years away in the constellation Sagittarius.

== Discovery ==
HD 180902 b, along with other planets, was discovered in 2010 by scientists at the Keck Observatory. These planets were discovered via doppler spectroscopy, which is detecting exoplanets using the star's wobble.

== Properties ==
Orbit

HD 180902 b takes 510 days to orbit its parent star, which is longer than Earth's orbital period, which is 365 days. It orbits at a distance similar to Earth from the sun. HD 180902 orbits with mild eccentricity.

=== Characteristics ===
HD 180902 b has a minimum mass of 1.685 times the mass of Jupiter, but since its inclination is not known, the true mass of the planet cannot be detected. According to a theoretical search by the observatory, it may have a radius that is 22.1% larger than Jupiter.

Size comparison
Jupiter	HD 180902 b
Jupiter	Exoplanet

== See also ==
- HD 4313 b
- HD 181342 b
- HD 206610 b
- HD 136418 b
- HD 212771 b
