= HD 136418 b =

Exoplanet in its star's habitable zone

HD 136418 b / Awasis
Discovery
- Discovered by: Johnson et al.
- Discovery date: 2010 March 17
- Detection method: Doppler spectroscopy

Orbital characteristics
- Semi-major axis: 1.32 ± 0.3 AU (197,000,000 ± 45,000,000 km)
- Eccentricity: 0.255 ± 0.041
- Orbital period (sidereal): 464.3 ± 3.2 d
- Star: HD 136418

HD 136418 b, also known by its proper name Awasis, is an extrasolar planet orbiting the G-type star HD 136418 approximately 320 light years away in the constellation Boötes It has a notable orbit, staying within the known habitable zone. It also has a star with a very similar temperature to the Sun.

It was named "Awasis" by representatives of Canada in the 2019 NameExoWorlds contest held by the IAU, named after the Cree word for "child". In the same competition, The planet's parent star HD 136418 was named "Nikawiy" after the Cree word for "mother".

== See also ==
- HD 4313 b
- HD 181342 b
- HD 206610 b
- HD 180902 b
- HD 212771 b
