= 51 Aquarii =

Binary star system in the constellation Aquarius

Observation data Epoch J2000 Equinox J2000
- Constellation: Aquarius
- Right ascension: 22^{h} 24^{m} 06.88433^{s}
- Declination: −04° 50′ 13.2692″
- Apparent magnitude (V): 5.78 (6.45 + 6.63)

Characteristics
- Evolutionary stage: main sequence
- Spectral type: A0 V + A0
- U−B color index: −0.11
- B−V color index: −0.04

Astrometry
Radial velocity (R_{v})	+6 km/s
Proper motion (μ)	RA: +26.90 mas/yr Dec.: −7.35 mas/yr
Parallax (π)	8.04±0.63 mas
Distance	410 ± 30 ly (124 ± 10 pc)
Absolute magnitude (M_{V})	+0.33

Orbit
Period (P)	145.07±1.85 yr
Semi-major axis (a)	0.402±0.003″
Eccentricity (e)	0.702±0.003
Inclination (i)	161.4±0.7°
Longitude of the node (Ω)	113.5±3.0°
Periastron epoch (T)	1987.66±0.05
Argument of periastron (ω) (secondary)	296.9±3.0°

Details

51 Aqr A
Mass	2.80±0.10 M_{☉}
Luminosity	88.2+14.8 −14.2 L_{☉}
Temperature	10,328±71 K
Rotational velocity (v sin i)	91 km/s

Other designations
- 51 Aqr, BD−05°5780, HD 212404, HIP 110578, HR 8533, SAO 146067, WDS J22241-0450

Database references
SIMBAD	data

51 Aquarii is a binary star system located around 410 light years away from the Sun in the equatorial constellation of Aquarius. 51 Aquarii is its Flamsteed designation. It is visible to the naked eye as a dim, yellow-white hued star with a combined apparent visual magnitude of 5.78. The system is moving further from the Earth with a heliocentric radial velocity of +6 km/s.

The dual nature of this system was discovered by S. W. Burnham in 1873 with a 6 inches (15 cm) Alvan Clark refractor. The pair orbit each other with a period of 145 years and a large eccentricity of 0.7. The magnitude 6.45 primary, designated component A, is an A-type main sequence star with a stellar classification of A0 V. It has a high rate of rotation with a projected rotational velocity of 91 km/s. The secondary component has a matching class of A0 with a visual magnitude of 6.63. It has an effective temperature of 10,238 K.
