= HD 206610 =

Star in the Aquarius constellation

HD 206610 / Bosona
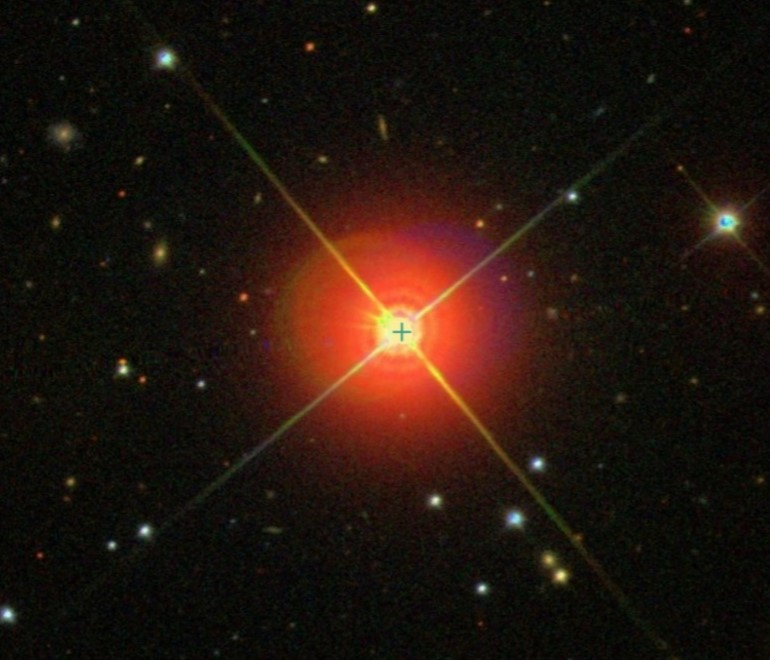
- SDSS image of HD 206610

Observation data Epoch J2000 Equinox J2000
- Constellation: Aquarius
- Right ascension: 21^{h} 43^{m} 24.900^{s}
- Declination: −07° 24′ 29.71″
- Apparent magnitude (V): 8.34

Characteristics
- Evolutionary stage: subgiant
- Spectral type: K0III
- B−V color index: 1.009±0.019

Astrometry
Radial velocity (R_{v})	−18.62±0.12 km/s
Proper motion (μ)	RA: 2.184±0.027 mas/yr Dec.: 1.781±0.024 mas/yr
Parallax (π)	6.7637±0.0270 mas
Distance	482 ± 2 ly (147.8 ± 0.6 pc)
Absolute magnitude (M_{V})	1.99

Details
Mass	1.51±0.05 M_{☉}
Radius	6.0±0.2 R_{☉}
Luminosity	18±1 L_{☉}
Surface gravity (log g)	3.22±0.02 cgs
Temperature	4,819±9 K
Metallicity [Fe/H]	0.09±0.05 dex
Rotational velocity (v sin i)	1.77±0.40 km/s
Age	3.0±0.3 Gyr

Other designations
- BD−08°5719, HD 206610, HIP 107251, SAO 145619, TIC 333314269, TYC 5221-00210-1, 2MASS J21432490-0724296, WISE J214324.89-072429.7, Gaia DR2 2667434008056899712

Database references
SIMBAD	data

HD 206610, also known as Bosona, is a star with an orbiting exoplanet in the constellation of Aquarius. Based on parallax measurements, it is located at a distance of approximately 482 light years from the Sun. The absolute magnitude of this star is 1.99, but at that distance it is too faint to view with the naked eye, having an apparent visual magnitude of 8.34. The system is drifting closer with a radial velocity of −18.6 km/s.

This is an aging K-type subgiant star with a stellar classification of K0III. Having exhausted the supply of hydrogen at its core, the star is cooling and expanding along the red giant branch. At the age of about three billion years, it has 1.5 times the Sun's mass and has grown to six times the radius of the Sun. It has a similar iron abundance to the Sun and is spinning with a projected rotational velocity of 1.77 km/s. The star is radiating 18 times the luminosity of the Sun from its enlarged photosphere at an effective temperature of 4,819 K.

The star HD 206610 and its exoplanet HD 206610 b are named Bosona and Naron respectively. The names were selected in the NameExoWorlds campaigns by Bosnia and Herzegovina during the 100th anniversary of the IAU. Bosona is the historic name for Bosnia, Horion Bosona, described in De Administrando Imperio by Porphyrogenitus in 10th century, and its namesake the river Bosna's ancient name Bosona (Bosina, Basina, Basante). Naron is one of the names given to the Neretva river in Herzegovina originating with the Romans (Naro, Narona, Narenta, Nerenta), while in local tradition the name is said to go back even earlier with the Celts who called it Nera Etwa, which means the Flowing Divinity.

== Planetary system ==
HD 206610 has one known exoplanet, HD 206610 b named Naron, discovered in 2010 using the radial velocity method.

The HD 206610 planetary system
Companion (in order from star)	Mass	Semimajor axis (AU)	Orbital period (days)	Eccentricity	Inclination	Radius
b / Naron	≥2.036±0.065 M_{J}	1.74±0.33	673.2±3.3	0.100±0.042	—	—
