= Messier 73 =

Asterism of four stars in the constellation Aquarius

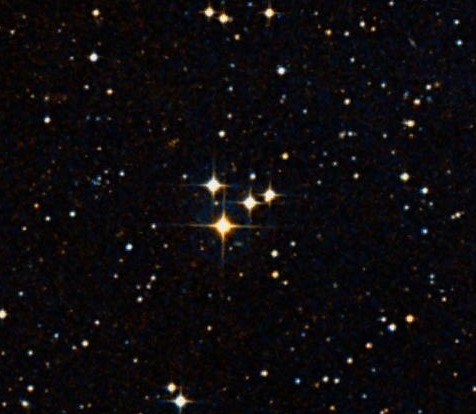
- Asterism Messier 73 in Aquarius

Observation data (J2000 epoch)
- Right ascension: 20^{h} 58^{m} 54^{s}
- Declination: −12° 38′
- Distance: Mean distance star approx. 1685 ly (approx. 516.6 pc)
- Apparent magnitude (V): 9.0
- Apparent dimensions (V): 2.8′

Physical characteristics
- Radius: ly
- Estimated age: million yrs
- Other designations: M 73, NGC 6994, Cr 426

Associations
- Constellation: Aquarius

Messier 73 (M73, also known as NGC 6994) is an asterism of four stars in the constellation Aquarius which was long thought to be a small open cluster. It lies several arcminutes east of globular cluster M72. According to Gaia EDR3, the stars are 1030±9, 1249±10, 2170±22, and 2290±24 light-years from the Sun, with the second being a binary star.

== History ==
M73 was discovered by Charles Messier in 1780 (Note: on October 4) who originally described the object as a cluster of four stars with some nebulosity. Much later observations by John Herschel could not find any nebulosity. Moreover, Herschel noted that the designation of M73 as a cluster was questionable. Nonetheless, Herschel included M73 in his General Catalogue of clusters, nebulae, and galaxies, and John Dreyer included M73 when he compiled the New General Catalogue.

== Relation between the stars ==
M73 was once treated as a potential sparsely populated open cluster, which consists of stars that are physically associated in space as well as on the sky. The question of whether the stars were an asterism or an open cluster was a matter of debate in the early 2000s.

In 2000, L. P. Bassino, S. Waldhausen, and R. E. Martinez published an analysis of the colors and luminosities of the stars in and around M73. They concluded that the four bright central stars and some other nearby stars followed the color-luminosity relation that is also followed by stars in open clusters (as seen in a Hertzsprung–Russell diagram). Their conclusion was that M73 was an old open cluster that was 9 ′ wide. However, G. Carraro, published results in 2000 based on a similar analysis and concluded that the stars did not follow any color-luminosity relation. Carraro's conclusion was that M73 was an asterism. Adding to the controversy, E. Bica and collaborators concluded that the chance alignment of the four bright stars seen in the center of M73 as well as one other nearby star was highly unlikely, so M73 was probably a sparse open cluster. The controversy was resolved in 2002, when M. Odenkirchen and C. Soubiran published an analysis of the high resolution spectra of the six brightest stars within 6 ′ of the centre point. They demonstrated that the distances from the Earth to the six stars were very different from each other, and the stars were moving in different directions. Therefore, they concluded that the stars were only an asterism.

Although M73 was determined to be only a chance alignment of stars, further analysis of asterisms is still important for the identification of sparsely populated open clusters. A full study of very many such clusters would demonstrate how, how often, and to what degree open clusters are ripped apart by the gravitational forces in the Milky Way and reveal more of the sources of these forces.

== Location ==
M73 is in Aquarius, just to the east (left) of M72.

== See also ==
- List of Messier objects
- Messier 40 - a double star included in the Messier catalogue that was also mistakenly identified as having nebulosity
