= HD 212771 =

Star located in the constellation Aquarius

HD 212771 / Lionrock
Observation data Epoch J2000 Equinox ICRS
- Constellation: Aquarius
- Right ascension: 22^{h} 27^{m} 03.072^{s}
- Declination: −17° 15′ 49.16″
- Apparent magnitude (V): 7.6±0.01

Characteristics
- Evolutionary stage: red giant branch
- Spectral type: G8 IV
- U−B color index: +0.54
- B−V color index: +0.88

Astrometry
Radial velocity (R_{v})	14.9±0.03 km/s
Proper motion (μ)	RA: −85.892 mas/yr Dec.: −104.042 mas/yr
Parallax (π)	8.9648±0.0314 mas
Distance	364 ± 1 ly (111.5 ± 0.4 pc)
Absolute magnitude (M_{V})	2.04

Details
Mass	1.42±0.07 M_{☉}
Radius	4.44±0.13 R_{☉}
Luminosity	11.67±0.57 L_{☉}
Surface gravity (log g)	3.263±0.010 cgs
Temperature	5,065±75 K
Metallicity [Fe/H]	−0.09±0.01 dex
Age	2.90±0.47 Gyr

Other designations
- BD−17°6526, HD 212771, HIP 110813, SAO 165086

Database references
SIMBAD	data
Exoplanet Archive	data

HD 212771, also named Lionrock, is a solitary star in the equatorial-southern zodiac constellation of Aquarius. It has an apparent magnitude of 7.60, making it readily visible with binoculars but not the naked eye. Parallax measurements place the object at a distance of 364 light-years, and is currently receding with a radial velocity of 15 km/s.

HD 212771 has a stellar classification of G8 IV, indicating that it is a subgiant evolving towards the red giant branch after being an F-type main-sequence star for 1.7 billion years. However, a close analysis of its asteroseismology and properties indicate that it has already reached the red giant branch. It has 142% the mass of the Sun and 4.4 times its radius. It radiates at 11.67 solar luminosities from its slightly enlarged photosphere at an effective temperature of 5,065 K, giving it a yellow-hue. Unlike most planetary hosts, HD 212771 is slightly metal deficient, and spins with a projected rotational velocity of about 2 km/s.

== Planetary system ==
In 2010, a group of astronomers at the Keck Observatory surveyed several subgiant stars for extrasolar planets via Doppler spectroscopy They happened to find a massive Jupiter-like planet orbiting HD 212771.

HD 212771 is named Lionrock. The name was selected in the NameExoWorlds campaign by Hong Kong, during the 100th anniversary of the IAU. It is named after the Lion Rock. The planet is named Victoriapeak, after the Victoria Peak.

The HD 212771 planetary system
Companion (in order from star)	Mass	Semimajor axis (AU)	Orbital period (days)	Eccentricity	Inclination (°)	Radius
b / Victoriapeak	≥2.39±0.27 M_{J}	1.19±0.13	381±1	0.076±0.051	—	—
