= HD 180902 =

Star in the constellation Sagittarius

Observation data Epoch J2000.0 Equinox ICRS
- Constellation: Sagittarius
- Right ascension: 19^{h} 19^{m} 17.708^{s}
- Declination: −23° 33′ 29.36″
- Apparent magnitude (V): 7.785

Characteristics
- Evolutionary stage: red giant branch
- Spectral type: K0 III/IV
- B−V color index: +0.94

Astrometry
Radial velocity (R_{v})	−2.781±0.140 km/s
Proper motion (μ)	RA: 37.832 mas/yr Dec.: −20.334 mas/yr
Parallax (π)	9.5339±0.0521 mas
Distance	342 ± 2 ly (104.9 ± 0.6 pc)
Absolute magnitude (M_{V})	2.5±0.3

Orbit
Primary	HD 180902 A
Name	HD 180902 B
Period (P)	5880±440 d
Semi-major axis (a)	7.15±0.69 AU
Eccentricity (e)	0.335±0.025
Periastron epoch (T)	2441100±1200 JD
Argument of periastron (ω) (secondary)	73.3±1.6°
Semi-amplitude (K_{1}) (primary)	898±28 km/s

Details

HD 180902 A
Mass	1.698±0.085 M_{☉}
Radius	4.247±0.212 R_{☉}
Luminosity	9.4±0.5 L_{☉}
Temperature	5,030±44 K
Metallicity [Fe/H]	0.04±0.03 dex
Age	2.8±0.7 Gyr

HD 180902 B
Mass	44.53^{+12.91}_{−5.88} M_{Jup}

Other designations
- CD−23°15276, HD 180902, HIP 94951, SAO 187961, PPM 269620

Database references
SIMBAD	data

HD 180902 is a star with two or more orbiting companions in the southern constellation of Sagittarius. This system is located at a distance of approximately 342 light years from the Sun based on parallax measurements, but is drifting closer with a radial velocity of −2.8 km/s. It has an absolute magnitude of 2.5, but at that distance the apparent visual magnitude of the system is 7.8, which is too faint to be seen with the naked eye.

The spectrum of the primary, component A, presents as an evolving subgiant star with a stellar classification of K0 III/IV. It is an estimated 2.8 billion years old with 1.7 times the mass of the Sun. The star has expanded to 4.2 times the radius of the Sun and is radiating 9.4 times the Sun's luminosity from an enlarged photosphere at an effective temperature of 5,030 K.

== Companions ==
HD 180902 b was discovered using the Doppler spectroscopy method with observations taken at the W. M. Keck Observatory. The radial velocities showed a long term linear trend in the data indicating an additional companion of unknown nature with a longer orbital period. This was subsequently shown to be due to an orbiting brown dwarf or low mass stellar companion, designated component B.

There is a second unconfirmed planet, HD 180902 c, with a mass at least twice that of Neptune and an orbital period of 15 days.

The HD 180902 planetary system
Companion (in order from star)	Mass	Semimajor axis (AU)	Orbital period (days)	Eccentricity	Inclination (°)	Radius
b	≥1.685±0.041 M_{J}	1.40±0.11	510.9±1.5	0.107±0.022	—	—
c (unconfirmed)	≥0.099±0.014 M_{J}	0.139±0.011	15.9058±0.0055	0.28±0.13	—	—
