= Al-Dhira' =

Arabic asterism in Canis Minor and Gemini

Gemini constellation map showing Castor, Pollux, Procyon and Beta Canis Minoris (Gomeisa)

Al-Dhirāʿ (Arabic: الذراع, lit. 'the forearm') is an Arabic name that was traditionally used for multiple groups of stars. Its dual form is Al-Dhirāʿān (الذراعان, lit. 'the two forearms'). Different spellings appear in older sources; for example, Geoffrey Chaucer used "Aldryan".

Two of these asterisms, collectively al-dhirāʿān, represented the forelegs of a lion, which was centered on Leo but much larger. Of these, al-dhirāʿ al-mabsūṭa (الذراع املبسوطة, lit. 'the extended forearm') was the pair of stars α and β Geminorum (Castor and Pollux), while al-dhirāʿ al-maqbūḍa (الذراع املقبوضة, lit. 'the clenched forearm') was α and β Canis Minoris (Procyon and Gomeisa). These asterisms marked the seventh lunar station, and are the source of the modern names Mebsuta and Mekbuda for the stars ε and ζ Geminorum.

A third asterism called al-dhirāʿ was formed by the stars γ, η, and τ Persei. This represented the forearm of al-Thurayyā, the Pleiades, whose arm reached out to her henna-dyed hand (al-kaff al-khaḍīb) in Cassiopeia (see Caph).

The Arabic term dhirāʿ can also refer to a unit of measurement, in the context of angular distance equivalent to the width of a thumb held up at arm's length, or about 2° 20′. R. H. Allen's 1899 book Star Names gave this unit, which he referred to as a cubit or ell, as an alternative meaning of the asterism name.

The fictional planet of Alderaan in Star Wars appears to have borrowed the name.
