= HD 4313 =

Star in the constellation of Pisces

Observation data Epoch J2000.0 Equinox J2000.0
- Constellation: Pisces
- Right ascension: 00^{h} 45^{m} 40.3578^{s}
- Declination: +07° 50′ 42.075″
- Apparent magnitude (V): 7.83

Characteristics
- Evolutionary stage: subgiant
- Spectral type: G5
- B−V color index: +0.963±0.017

Astrometry
Radial velocity (R_{v})	+14.48±0.23 km/s
Proper motion (μ)	RA: −6.281 mas/yr Dec.: +6.566 mas/yr
Parallax (π)	7.3090±0.0879 mas
Distance	446 ± 5 ly (137 ± 2 pc)
Absolute magnitude (M_{V})	2.17

Details
Mass	1.61^{+0.13}_{−0.12} M_{☉}
Radius	5.15^{+0.18}_{−0.17} R_{☉}
Luminosity	15.81 L_{☉}
Surface gravity (log g)	3.24 cgs
Temperature	4,966±40 K
Metallicity [Fe/H]	0.05±0.10 dex
Rotational velocity (v sin i)	1.91±0.25 km/s
Age	2.03^{+0.64}_{−0.45} Gyr

Other designations
- BD+07°104, HD 4313, HIP 3574, 2MASS J00454035+0750421, Gaia DR2 2557541493057378048

Database references
SIMBAD	data

HD 4313 is a star with an orbiting exoplanetary companion in the constellation of Pisces. It has an apparent visual magnitude of 7.83, which is too faint to be reading visible to the unaided eye. The system is located at a distance of 446 light years based on parallax, and is drifting further away with a radial velocity of 14.5 km/s. This is a single star, which means it has no binary partners, at least in a range of projected separations from 6.85 to 191.78 AU. It hosts an extrasolar planet.

This is an aging G-type star with a mass of nearly twice the Sun, although different methods give mass estimates which differ as much as 0.5 M_{☉}. It is a swollen star with 5.14 times the radius of the Sun, and has a cool effective temperature of 4,966±40 k. It is a G-type subgiant star which has exhausted the hydrogen at its core, and is cooling and expanding to become a red giant. It is around two billion years in age and is spinning with a projected rotational velocity of 1.9 km/s.

== Planetary system ==
HD 4313 has a superjovian exoplanet orbiting it. This exoplanet was discovered in 2010. It is orbiting the star at a distance of 1.16 AU with an orbital period of 356 days and an eccentricity (ovalness) of 0.15. As the orbital inclination is unknown, only a lower bound on the mass can be determined. The exoplanet has at least 1.2 times the mass of Jupiter.

The HD 4313 planetary system
Companion (in order from star)	Mass	Semimajor axis (AU)	Orbital period (days)	Eccentricity	Inclination (°)	Radius
b	≥ 1.927±0.090 M_{J}	1.157±0.097	356.21±0.88	0.147±0.047	—	1.2 R_{J}
