= 25 Aquarii =

Single, K-type star in the constellation Aquarius

- Location of 25 Aquarii (circled)

Observation data Epoch J2000 Equinox ICRS
- Constellation: Aquarius
- Right ascension: 21^{h} 39^{m} 33.26719^{s}
- Declination: +02° 14′ 36.8193″
- Apparent magnitude (V): +5.09

Characteristics
- Evolutionary stage: red clump
- Spectral type: K0 III
- U−B color index: +0.90
- B−V color index: +1.032

Astrometry
Radial velocity (R_{v})	−34.63±0.11 km/s
Proper motion (μ)	RA: −30.179 mas/yr Dec.: −83.636 mas/yr
Parallax (π)	13.2155±0.0892 mas
Distance	247 ± 2 ly (75.7 ± 0.5 pc)
Absolute magnitude (M_{V})	+0.768

Details
Mass	3.0 M_{☉}
Radius	11 R_{☉}
Luminosity	54 L_{☉}
Surface gravity (log g)	2.67 cgs
Temperature	4,721 K
Metallicity [Fe/H]	−0.17 dex
Rotational velocity (v sin i)	2.5 km/s
Age	377 Myr

Other designations
- d Aquarii, 25 Aqr, 6 Pegasi, BD+01 4517, FK5 3729, HD 206067, HIP 106944, HR 8277, SAO 126965

Database references
SIMBAD	data

25 Aquarii (abbreviated 25 Aqr) is a single star in the equatorial constellation of Aquarius. 25 Aquarii is the modern Flamsteed designation; in the past it held the designation 6 Pegasi. It also bears the Bayer designation of d Aquarii. It is located near the border with the modern constellation Pegasus. Although faint at an apparent visual magnitude of +5.09, it is bright enough to be viewed from suburban skies. Based upon an annual parallax shift of 0.0132 arcseconds, it is located at a distance of around 247 light-years (76 parsecs) from Earth. The visual magnitude of the star is diminished by 0.09 from extinction caused by intervening gas and dust.

The spectrum of this star matches a stellar classification of K0 III, with the luminosity class of III indicating that this is a giant star that has evolved away from the main sequence after exhausting the supply of hydrogen at its core. It belongs to a population known as clump giants and hence is generating energy through the nuclear fusion of helium at the core. The outer envelope has expanded to 11 times the radius of the Sun and it is radiating 54 times the Sun's luminosity. This energy is being emitted from the stellar atmosphere at an effective temperature of 4,721 K, causing it to glow with the orange hue of a K-type star.
