= HD 216718 =

Binary star system in the constellation Aquarius

Observation data Epoch J2000 Equinox J2000
- Constellation: Aquarius
- Right ascension: 22^{h} 55^{m} 10.96166^{s}
- Declination: −04° 59′ 16.4546″
- Apparent magnitude (V): 5.72 (6.03 + 7.75)

Characteristics
- Spectral type: K0III-IV
- U−B color index: +0.60
- B−V color index: +0.88

Astrometry
Radial velocity (R_{v})	−7.06±0.13 km/s
Proper motion (μ)	RA: +29.88 mas/yr Dec.: −10.78 mas/yr
Parallax (π)	11.99±0.65 mas
Distance	270 ± 10 ly (83 ± 5 pc)
Absolute magnitude (M_{V})	+1.12

Orbit
Period (P)	96.48 yr
Semi-major axis (a)	0.4810″
Eccentricity (e)	0.6430

Details
Surface gravity (log g)	3.16 cgs
Temperature	5,080 K
Metallicity [Fe/H]	0.04 dex
Rotational velocity (v sin i)	0.0 km/s

Other designations
- BU 718, BD−05°5885, HD 216718, HIP 113184, HR 8716, SAO 146388

Database references
SIMBAD	data

HD 216718 is a binary star system in the equatorial constellation of Aquarius.
