= USS Situla =

Cargo ship of the United States Navy

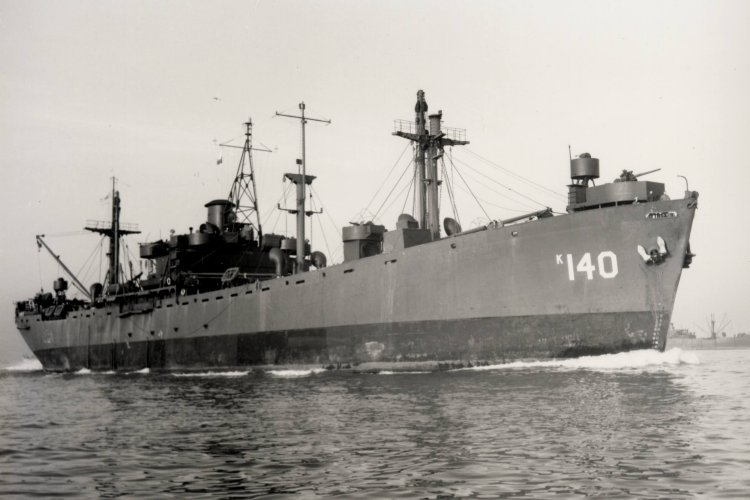
- USS Situla, San Francisco Bay, 1945

History

United States
- Name: John Whiteaker; Situla
- Namesake: John Whiteaker; Situla
- Ordered: as a type (EC2-S-C1) hull, MCE hull 1590, SS John Whiteaker
- Builder: Oregon Shipbuilding Corporation, Portland, Oregon
- Laid down: 9 January 1943
- Launched: 7 February 1943
- Sponsored by: Miss Anne Whiteaker
- Acquired: 2 December 1943
- Commissioned: 14 January 1944
- Decommissioned: 23 April 1946
- Refit: Converted for Naval service at Hunter's Point Navy Yard, San Francisco, CA. and fitted out at Terminal Island, San Pedro, CA.
- Stricken: 22 January 1948
- Identification: Hull symbol:AK-140
- Fate: Scrapped 28 September 1961

General characteristics
- Class & type: Crater-class cargo ship
- Displacement: 4,023 long tons (4,088 t) (standard); 14,550 long tons (14,780 t) (full load)
- Length: 441 ft 6 in (134.57 m)
- Beam: 56 ft 11 in (17.35 m)
- Draft: 28 ft 4 in (8.64 m)
- Installed power: 2 × Babcock & Wilcox header-type boilers, 220psi 450°; 2,500 shp (1,900 kW)
- Propulsion: 1 × Iron Fireman triple-expansion reciprocating steam engine; 1 × shaft
- Speed: 12.5 kn (23.2 km/h; 14.4 mph)
- Complement: 281 officers and enlisted
- Armament: 1 × 5 in (127 mm)/38 caliber dual-purpose (DP) gun; 1 × 3 in (76 mm)/50 caliber DP gun; 2 × 40 mm (1.57 in) Bofors anti-aircraft (AA) gun mounts; 6 × 20 mm (0.79 in) Oerlikon cannon AA gun mounts

USS Situla (AK-140) was a Crater-class cargo ship in the service of the United States Navy in World War II. It was the only ship of the Navy to have borne this name. It is named after the star Situla.

== Built in Portland, Oregon ==
Situla (AK-140), formerly liberty ship SS John Whiteaker (MC hull 1590), was laid down on 9 January 1943 by the Oregon Shipbuilding Corporation, Portland, Oregon; launched on 7 February 1943; sponsored by Miss Anne Whiteaker; and commissioned on 14 January 1944.

== World War II ==
Situla was accepted from the War Shipping Administration on a bare-boat basis on 2 December 1943; converted to a cargo ship at the San Francisco Navy Yard; fitted out at San Pedro, California; held her shakedown cruise from San Diego on 31 January 1944; and then returned to San Diego on 11 February for further routing. On 17 February, she sailed for Kahului, Hawaii; discharged her cargo; and moved over to Pearl Harbor on 29 February.

=== South Pacific ===
The cargo ship sailed for the Marshall Islands on 21 March and operated from Majuro until 11 May. She returned to Pearl Harbor from 22 May to 19 June and then sailed for Eniwetok, via Kwajalein, to deliver cargo. From 26 September to 21 November, Situla plied between Eniwetok, Kwajalein, Saipan, and Guam. Following yard availability at Pearl Harbor from 21 November to 10 December 1944, the AK returned to her island resupply duty until sailing for Portland, Oregon, on 5 April 1945 for drydocking and overhaul.

On 30 May, Situla stood out of Portland with a load of army cargo for Guam. She was diverted to Saipan and loaded Army Air Force belly tanks destined for Ie Shima, Okinawa Gunto. The ship arrived at Ie Shima on 10 August and was anchored there when the war ended. She remained there until 7 October when she sailed for Yokohama, Japan, arriving on 12 October. On the 30 October, Situla sailed for San Francisco, via Saipan, with all available passenger space filled by Army and Navy discharges.

== Post-war decommissioning ==
Situla remained on the west coast from 29 November 1945 until 23 April 1946 when she was ordered back to Pearl Harbor for photographic services and layup. She was decommissioned at the Naval Shipyard there on 23 April 1946. The cargo ship returned to San Francisco on 28 November 1947 for disposal. She was stripped and turned over to the Maritime Commission at Suisun Bay on 30 December 1947. Situla was struck from the Navy list on 22 January 1948. She was sold for scrapping, 14 March 1961 (PC-X-599) for $62,139.89 to Union Minerals & Alloys Corp and dismantled by Learner Corp. Oakland, CA., completed 28 September 1961.

Her crew members were eligible for the following medals:

- American Campaign Medal
- Asiatic-Pacific Campaign Medal
- World War II Victory Medal
