= Theta Aquarii =

Star in the constellation Aquarius

θ Aquarii
- Location of θ Aquarii (circled)

Observation data Epoch J2000 Equinox J2000
- Constellation: Aquarius
- Right ascension: 22^{h} 16^{m} 50.037^{s}
- Declination: −07° 46′ 59.84″
- Apparent magnitude (V): 4.175

Characteristics
- Evolutionary stage: red giant branch
- Spectral type: G8 III–IV
- U−B color index: +0.818
- B−V color index: +0.983

Astrometry
Radial velocity (R_{v})	−13.77±0.17 km/s
Proper motion (μ)	RA: +118.929 mas/yr Dec.: −21.928 mas/yr
Parallax (π)	17.0893±0.1471 mas
Distance	191 ± 2 ly (58.5 ± 0.5 pc)
Absolute magnitude (M_{V})	+0.23

Details
Mass	2.39 to 2.78 M_{☉}
Radius	12 R_{☉}
Luminosity	72 to 83 L_{☉}
Surface gravity (log g)	2.8 cgs
Temperature	4,864 K
Metallicity [Fe/H]	+0.01 to +0.09 dex
Rotational velocity (v sin i)	1.6 km/s
Age	437 Myr

Other designations
- Ancha, θ Aquarii, Tet Aqr, θ Aqr, 43 Aquarii, BD−08 5845, FK5 840, HD 211391, HIP 110003, HR 8499, SAO 145991

Database references
SIMBAD	data

Theta Aquarii is a star in the equatorial constellation of Aquarius. Its identifier is a Bayer designation that is Latinized from θ Aquarii, and abbreviated Tet Aqr or θ Aqr, respectively. It has the official name Ancha, which is pronounced /ˈæŋkə/. Visible to the naked eye at an apparent visual magnitude of 4.175, it is located at a distance of around 191 light-years (59 parsecs) from the Sun. The star is drifting closer to the Sun with a radial velocity of −14 km/s. Since it is near the ecliptic it can be occulted by the Moon, or very rarely by planets.

== Nomenclature ==
θ Aquarii (Latinised to Theta Aquarii) is the star's Bayer designation.

It bore the traditional name Ancha; Medieval Latin for "the haunch". In 2016, the International Astronomical Union organized a Working Group on Star Names (WGSN) to catalogue and standardize proper names for stars. The WGSN approved the name Ancha for this star on 12 September 2016, and it is now so included in the List of IAU-approved Star Names.

In Chinese, 泣 (Qì), meaning Weeping, refers to an asterism consisting of Theta Aquarii and Rho Aquarii. Consequently, the Chinese name for Theta Aquarii itself is 泣二 (Qì èr, English: the Second Star of Weeping). Possibly, the name Lei, meaning "tears (weeping)" in Chinese, derives from the Chinese name for this star.

== Properties ==
Ancha belongs to the spectral class G8 with a luminosity class of III–IV suggesting that, at an age of 437 million years, this star is part way between the subgiant and giant stages of its evolution. Estimates of the star's mass range from 2.39 to 2.78 times the Sun's mass, with a radius of about 12 times that of the Sun. It is radiating from 72 to 83 times as much luminosity as the Sun from its enlarged outer envelope at an effective temperature of 4,864 K. At this heat, the star glows with the yellow hue of a G-type star.
