= 44 Aquarii =

Star in the constellation Aquarius

Observation data Epoch J2000 Equinox ICRS
- Constellation: Aquarius
- Right ascension: 22^{h} 17^{m} 06.49946^{s}
- Declination: −05° 23′ 13.8000″
- Apparent magnitude (V): 5.75

Characteristics
- Evolutionary stage: horizontal branch
- Spectral type: G6 III
- U−B color index: +0.51
- B−V color index: +0.88
- Variable type: suspected

Astrometry
Radial velocity (R_{v})	+7.4 km/s
Proper motion (μ)	RA: −6.05 mas/yr Dec.: +18.67 mas/yr
Parallax (π)	9.7114±0.0934 mas
Distance	336 ± 3 ly (103.0 ± 1.0 pc)
Absolute magnitude (M_{V})	+0.51

Details
Mass	2.53 M_{☉}
Radius	9.14+0.38 −0.34 R_{☉}
Luminosity	53.169±0.628 L_{☉}
Surface gravity (log g)	2.70 cgs
Temperature	5,025 K
Metallicity [Fe/H]	−0.31 dex
Rotational velocity (v sin i)	1.8±0.8 km/s
Age	537 Myr

Other designations
- 44 Aqr, NSV 14100, BD−06°5960, FK5 3782, HD 211434, HIP 110023, HR 8504, SAO 145993

Database references
SIMBAD	data

44 Aquarii is a single star located 336 light years away from the Sun in the equatorial constellation of Aquarius. 44 Aquarii is its Flamsteed designation. It is visible to the naked eye as a dim, yellow-hued star with an apparent visual magnitude of 5.75. This body is moving away from the Earth with a heliocentric radial velocity of +7.4 km/s.

A stellar classification of G6 III indicates this is an evolved giant star, most likely (98% chance) on the horizontal branch, having exhausted the hydrogen at its core and expanded. It is a suspected variable star of unknown type. 44 Aquarii is 537 million years old with about 2.53 times the mass of the Sun and 9 times the Sun's radius. The star is radiating 62 times the Sun's luminosity from its photosphere at an effective temperature of 5,025 K. At this heat, the star has the golden-hued glow of a G-type star.
