= Rho Arietis =

The Bayer designation Rho Arietis (ρ Arietis, abbreviated to ρ Ari) is shared by three stars in the constellation of Aries:

- ρ¹ Arietis (44 Arietis), an A-type main sequence star.
- ρ² Arietis (45 Arietis), an M-type giant star.
- ρ³ Arietis (46 Arietis), an F-type main sequence star.

In some instances, ρ³ Arietis is called simply ρ Arietis.
