= Zeta Aquarii =

Triple star system in constellation of Aquarius

ζ Aquarii
- Location of ζ Aquarii (circled)

Observation data Epoch J2000 Equinox ICRS
- Constellation: Aquarius
- ζ Aqr A
- Right ascension: 22^{h} 28^{m} 49.888^{s}
- Declination: −00° 01′ 11.87″
- Apparent magnitude (V): 4.42
- ζ Aqr B
- Right ascension: 22^{h} 28^{m} 49.886^{s}
- Declination: −00° 01′ 13.96″
- Apparent magnitude (V): 4.51

Characteristics
- Spectral type: F3 V + F6 IV
- U−B color index: −0.01
- B−V color index: +0.40

Astrometry

ζ Aqr A
Radial velocity (R_{v})	+24.9 km/s
Proper motion (μ)	RA: +180.832 mas/yr Dec.: +33.072 mas/yr
Parallax (π)	34.5070±0.4712 mas
Distance	95 ± 1 ly (29.0 ± 0.4 pc)
Absolute magnitude (M_{V})	1.15

ζ Aqr B
Radial velocity (R_{v})	+28.9 km/s
Proper motion (μ)	RA: +224.295 mas/yr Dec.: +25.396 mas/yr
Parallax (π)	34.4525±0.3109 mas
Distance	94.7 ± 0.9 ly (29.0 ± 0.3 pc)

Orbit
Primary	ζ Aqr Aa
Name	ζ Aqr Ab
Period (P)	25.95±0.048 yr
Semi-major axis (a)	0.385″
Eccentricity (e)	0.872±0.006
Inclination (i)	11.8±6.7°
Longitude of the node (Ω)	293.7±74°
Periastron epoch (T)	B 2006.52±0.13
Argument of periastron (ω) (secondary)	100.9±73°

Orbit
Primary	ζ Aqr A
Name	ζ Aqr B
Period (P)	540±15 yr
Semi-major axis (a)	3.496±0.046" (101.3 AU (Note: Semi-major axis in AU = $\frac{semimajor\ axis\ in\ seconds}{parallax\ in\ seconds}\ {{=}}\ \frac{3.496}{.0345070}$ = 101.3 AU; as the eccentricity is 0.42, the distance fluctuates between 58% and 142% of that, roughly from 58.9 AU to 144 AU.))
Eccentricity (e)	0.419±0.011
Inclination (i)	142.0±0.4°
Longitude of the node (Ω)	131.3±0.8°
Periastron epoch (T)	B 1981.50±0.58
Argument of periastron (ω) (secondary)	269.3±1.7°

Details

ζ Aqr Aa
Mass	1.4 M_{☉}
Metallicity [Fe/H]	−0.13 dex
Rotational velocity (v sin i)	62 km/s
Age	3 Gyr

ζ Aqr Ab
Mass	0.6 M_{☉}

ζ Aqr B
Mass	1.4 M_{☉}
Rotational velocity (v sin i)	56 km/s

Other designations
- ζ Aquarii, ζ Aqr, Zet Aqr, 55 Aquarii, BD−00°4365, HIP 110960, ADS 15971
- ζ Aqr A: ζ^{2} Aquarii, Zeta^{2} Aquarii, HD 213052, HR 8559, SAO 146108
- ζ Aqr B: ζ^{1} Aquarii, Zeta^{1} Aquarii, HD 213051, HR 8558, SAO 146107

Database references
SIMBAD	ζ Aqr
- ζ Aqr A
- ζ Aqr B

Zeta Aquarii is a triple star system, the central star of the "water jar" asterism in the equatorial constellation of Aquarius. Its identifier is a Bayer designation that is Latinized from ζ Aquarii, and abbreviated Zet Aqr or ζ Aqr, respectively. The combined apparent visual magnitude of this system is 3.65, which is readily visible to the naked eye. Parallax measurements yield a distance estimate of around 95 light-years (29 parsecs) from Earth.

== Etymology ==
In the catalogue of stars in the Calendarium of Al Achsasi Al Mouakket, this star was designated Achr al Achbiya (آخر ألأخبية - ākhir al-akhbiya), which was translated into Latin as Postrema Tabernaculorum, meaning the end of luck of the homes (tents). This star, along with γ Aqr (Sadachbia), π Aqr and η Aqr (Fenmu), were al-Akḣbiya (الأخبية), the Tents.

In Chinese, 墳墓 (Fén Mù), meaning Tomb, refers to an asterism consisting of ζ Aquarii, γ Aquarii, η Aquarii and π Aquarii. Consequently, the Chinese name for ζ Aquarii itself is 墳墓一 (Fén Mù yī, English: the First Star of Tomb.)

== Properties ==
=== Orbits ===
The two stars have an orbital period of about 587 years. The semimajor axis is 3.8 arcseconds and they have an orbital eccentricity of 0.40. The orbital plane is inclined by 138.2° to the plane of the sky.

=== Spectral class and stellar mass ===
The brighter component, ζ Aquarii A (also called ζ^{2} Aquarii), is a yellow-white-hued F-type main sequence star with an apparent magnitude of +4.42 and a stellar classification of F3 V. Its companion, ζ Aquarii B (also called ζ^{1} Aquarii), is a yellow-white-hued F-type subgiant with an apparent magnitude of +4.51 and a class of F6 IV. Their similar brightness makes the pair easy to measure and resolve.

Zeta Aquarii A is known to be an astrometric binary system, as it undergoes regular perturbations from its orbit. It has a 26-year orbital period and a semimajor axis of 0.11″. The secondary's mass is 0.6 M_{☉}.

== Observational history ==
The binary was measured by William Herschel in 1779; however, Christian Mayer listed an earlier observation in his first double-star catalog in 1784, so it is not known who first identified Zeta Aquarii as a binary star system.

Photographic measurements available since the early 20th century were more precise than earlier micrometer estimates, and they revealed regular orbital deviations in the Zeta Aquarii system. Kaj Aage Gunnar Strand in 1942 was the first to note this pattern and identify Zeta Aquarii as a triple star system. Several other astronomers later published revised models of the system's orbits.

At first, Strand and the other astronomers assumed that the third star (which had still not been observed directly) was in orbit around Zeta Aquarii B. The first claimed direct images of this third star were in 1979, by Ebersberger and Weigelt (who claimed that it revolved around Zeta Aquarii A instead), and then in 1982 by McCarthy et al., who again attributed it to Zeta Aquarii B. In a 1984 paper, Wulff-Dieter Heintz dismissed both claims as bogus and proposed a new orbital model, demonstrating that the third star revolved around Zeta Aquarii A. (According to Andrei Tokovinin, the imaging technology available at the time would not have been capable of producing an image of the third star.) This third star, now known as Zeta Aquarii Ab, was not directly imaged until 2009, by the Southern Astrophysical Research Telescope. Initially, the third star was attributed to Zeta Aquarii B, but later observations (such as Hartkopf et al. in 2012) "securely" identified it with Zeta Aquarii A instead.

Zeta Aquarii is currently a northern hemisphere object. In 2004 it was directly above the celestial equator, and before that it was located south of it.
