= Gamma Aquarii =

Star in the constellation Aquarius

- Location of γ Aquarii (circled)

Observation data Epoch J2000 Equinox ICRS
- Constellation: Aquarius
- Right ascension: 22^{h} 21^{m} 39.37542^{s}
- Declination: −01° 23′ 14.4031″
- Apparent magnitude (V): 3.849

Characteristics
- Spectral type: A0 V
- U−B color index: −0.092
- B−V color index: −0.060

Astrometry
Radial velocity (R_{v})	−15.7±0.9 km/s
Proper motion (μ)	RA: +129.53 mas/yr Dec.: +7.77 mas/yr
Parallax (π)	19.92±1.04 mas
Distance	164 ± 9 ly (50 ± 3 pc)
Absolute magnitude (M_{V})	+0.10

Details

Aa
Mass	2.72±0.04 M_{☉}
Radius	2.7 R_{☉}
Surface gravity (log g)	3.99±0.14 cgs
Temperature	10,637±362 K
Metallicity [Fe/H]	+0.30 dex
Rotational velocity (v sin i)	80 km/s
Age	280±20 Myr

Ab
Mass	0.56 M_{☉}
Radius	0.5 R_{☉}
Temperature	3,900 K

Other designations
- Sadalachbia, Sadachbia, Gamma Aqr, γ Aqr, 48 Aquarii, BD−02°5741, FK5 842, HD 212061, HIP 110395, HR 8518, SAO 146044, ADS 15864, WDS J22217-0123A

Database references
SIMBAD	data

Gamma Aquarii, or γ Aquarii, is a binary star system in the constellation of Aquarius. It has an apparent visual magnitude of 3.849, making it one of the brighter members of the constellation. Based upon parallax measurements, this star is located at a distance of 164 light-years (50 parsecs). It is drifting closer to Earth with a radial velocity of −16 km/s. It is a candidate member of the Hyades Supercluster.

The two components are designated Gamma Aquarii Aa, formally called Sadachbia /səˈdækbiə/, and Ab.

== Nomenclature ==
γ Aquarii, Latinised to Gamma Aquarii, is the system's Bayer designation. WDS J22217-0123 A is its designation in the Washington Double Star Catalog.

It bore the traditional name Sadachbia, from an Arabic expression سعد الأخبية (sa‘d al-’axbiyah), meaning "luck of the homes (tents)". In the catalogue of stars in the Calendarium of Al Achsasi Al Mouakket, this star was designated Aoul al Achbiya (أول ألأجبية - awwil al ahbiyah), which was translated into Latin as Prima Tabernaculorum, meaning the first of luck of the homes (tents). In 2016, the International Astronomical Union organized a Working Group on Star Names (WGSN) to catalogue and standardize proper names for stars. The WGSN approved the name Sadachbia for the component WDS J22217-0123 Aa on 21 August 2016, and it is now so included in the List of IAU-approved Star Names.

This star, along with Pi Aquarii, Zeta Aquarii and Eta Aquarii, were al Aḣbiyah الأخبية "the Tent".

In Hindi it has been called Satabhishaj or Shatabhisha (a hundred physicians), but this name originally referred to λ Aquarii and its association with this star is likely an error. Equivalent names are Sadhayam in Tamil and Chathayam (written as ചതയം) in Malayalam.

In Chinese, 墳墓 (Fén Mù), meaning Tomb, refers to an asterism consisting of Gamma Aquarii, Zeta Aquarii, Eta Aquarii and Pi Aquarii. Consequently, the Chinese name for Gamma Aquarii itself is 墳墓二 (Fén Mù èr, English: the Second Star of Tomb).

== Properties ==
In 1978 through 1984, H. A. McAlister listed this as a spectroscopic binary star system that is unresolved by speckle interferometry, and it is listed as such in the 1991 revision of the Bright Star Catalogue. In 2008, P. P. Eggleton and A. A. Tokovinin listed it as a single star in their catalogue of multiplicity. However, in 2024, a companion star to Gamma Aquarii was detected by interferometric observations.

The primary is an A-type main sequence star with a stellar classification of A0 V, around 2.7 times larger and more massive than the Sun. It was a candidate Lambda Boötis star, suggesting it may have accreted low-metallicity circumstellar gas some time in the past. But it has since been excluded. The star is spinning relatively rapidly with a projected rotational velocity of 80 km s^{−1}. This value gives a lower bound on the actual azimuthal velocity along the star's equator. The outer atmosphere of Gamma Aquarii is radiating energy at an effective temperature of 10,500 K, which is nearly double the temperature at the surface of the Sun. This heat is what gives Gamma Aquarii the white-hot glow of an A-type star.

The secondary component is a low-mass star which has around 0.56 times the mass and half the radius of the Sun. Its effective temperature of 3,900 K gives it the orange hue typical of late K-type stars. This secondary could explain the X-ray emission detected from this system with the ROSAT X-ray telescope. Located 1.9 astronomical units from each other, both stars take around a year to orbit the system's center of mass.
