= HD 181342 =

Star in the constellation Sagittarius

HD 181342 / Belel
Observation data Epoch J2000 Equinox ICRS
- Constellation: Sagittarius
- Right ascension: 19^{h} 21^{m} 04.23048^{s}
- Declination: −23° 37′ 10.4502″
- Apparent magnitude (V): 7.55

Characteristics
- Evolutionary stage: red giant branch
- Spectral type: K0 III
- B−V color index: +1.02

Astrometry
Radial velocity (R_{v})	−0.76±0.07 km/s
Proper motion (μ)	RA: −46.661 mas/yr Dec.: −30.244 mas/yr
Parallax (π)	8.2972±0.0189 mas
Distance	393.1 ± 0.9 ly (120.5 ± 0.3 pc)
Absolute magnitude (M_{V})	2.2 ± 0.2

Details
Mass	1.78±0.11 M_{☉}
Radius	4.55±0.49 R_{☉}
Luminosity	16.2 L_{☉}
Surface gravity (log g)	3.42±0.07 cgs
Temperature	4,976±26 K
Metallicity [Fe/H]	+0.22±0.05 dex
Rotational velocity (v sin i)	1.92±0.23 km/s
Age	1.56±0.28 Gyr

Other designations
- Belel, CD−23°15307, CPD−23°7442, HD 181342, HIP 95124, SAO 188005

Database references
SIMBAD	data
Exoplanet Archive	data

HD 181342 is a star with an orbiting exoplanet in the constellation of Sagittarius. With an apparent magnitude of 7.55, it cannot be seen with the naked eye. Parallax measurements made by Gaia spacecraft put the star at a distance of 393 light-years (120 parsecs) away. It is drifting closer with a heliocentric radial velocity of −0.8 km/s.

The star HD 181342 is named Belel and the planetary companion is Dopere. The name was selected in the NameExoWorlds campaign by Senegal, during the 100th anniversary of the IAU. Belel is a rare source of water in the north of Senegal. Dopere is an expansive historical area in the north of Senegal where Belel was located.

HD 181342 is a K-type red giant star with a stellar classification of K0 III. It was formerly an A-type main-sequence star, but at an age of 1.56 billion years it has swelled up to a size of 4.55 solar radii. It is currently 1.78 times the mass of the Sun, 16.2 times as luminous, and its effective temperature is 4,976 K.

A survey in 2015 ruled out the existence of any additional stellar companions at projected distances from 138 to 762 astronomical units.

== Planetary system ==
HD 181342 is known to have one planet, detected with Doppler spectroscopy. The planet, HD 181342 b, orbits at a distance of 1.59 astronomical units (AU), every 564 days (almost one and half years). Its mass is at least 2.4 times that of Jupiter.

The HD 181342 planetary system
Companion (in order from star)	Mass	Semimajor axis (AU)	Orbital period (days)	Eccentricity	Inclination (°)	Radius
b / Dopere	≥2.4+0.15 −0.16 M_{J}	1.592±0.091	563.6+5.7 −3.7	0.022±0.051	—	—
