= Messier 72 =

Globular cluster in the constellation Aquarius

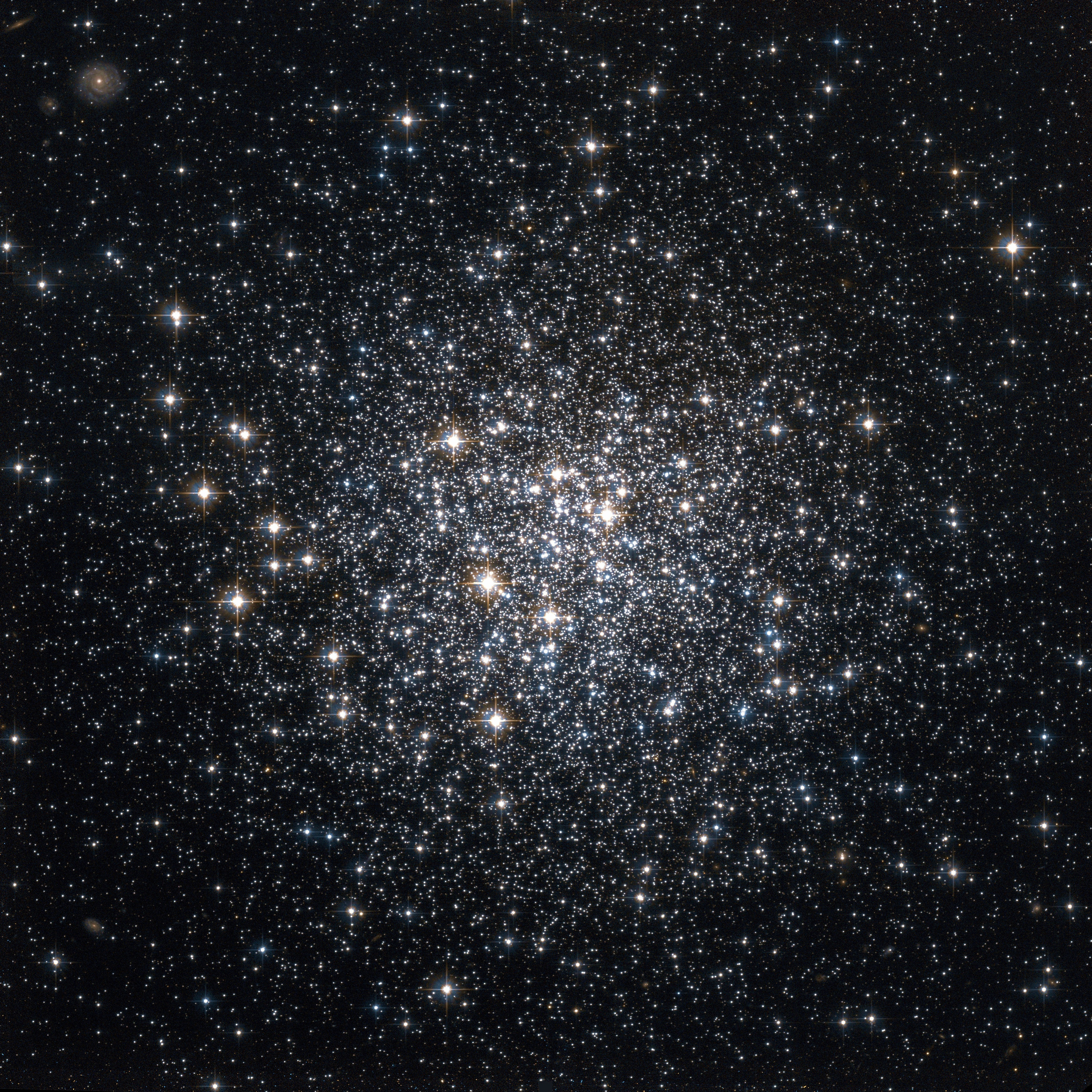
- M72 from Hubble Space Telescope; 3.44′ view

Observation data (J2000 epoch)
- Class: IX
- Constellation: Aquarius
- Right ascension: 20^{h} 53^{m} 27.70^{s}
- Declination: –12° 32′ 14.3″
- Distance: 54.57 ± 1.17 kly (16.73 ± 0.36 kpc)
- Apparent magnitude (V): 9.3
- Apparent dimensions (V): 6.6'

Physical characteristics
- Mass: 1.68×10^{5} M_{☉}
- Metallicity: [Fe/H] = –1.48 ± 0.03 dex
- Estimated age: 9.5 Gyr
- Other designations: NGC 6981, GCl 118

Messier 72 (also known as M72 or NGC 6981) is a globular cluster in the south west of the southern constellation of Aquarius.

== Observational history ==
M72 was discovered by astronomer Pierre Méchain on August 29, 1780. His countryman Charles Messier looked for it 36 days later, and included it in his catalog. Both opted for the then-dominant of the competing terms for such objects, considering it a faint nebula rather than a cluster. With a larger instrument, astronomer John Herschel called it a bright "cluster of stars of a round figure". Astronomer Harlow Shapley noted a similarity to Messier 4 and 12.

It is visible in a good night sky as a faint nebula in a telescope with a 6 cm (2.4 in) aperture.

== Properties ==
Based upon a 2011 census of variable stars, the cluster is 54,500 light-years (16,700 pc) away from the Sun. It has an estimated combined mass of 168,000 solar masses (M_{☉}), and is around 9.5 billion years old. There are 43 identified variable stars in the cluster.

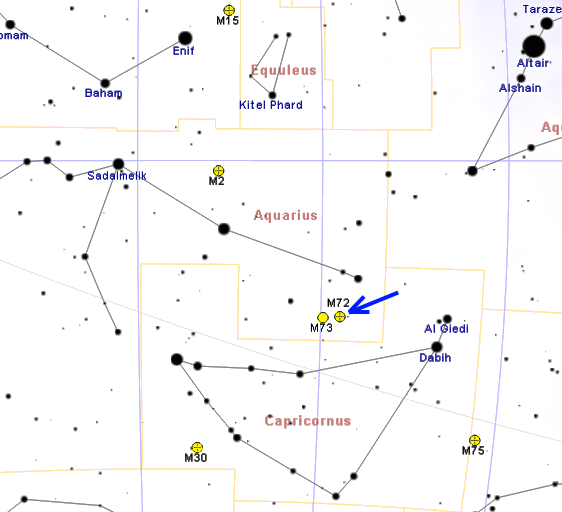
Map showing location of M72

== See also ==
- List of Messier objects
