= Eta Aquarii =

B-type star in the constellation Aquarius

- Location of η Aquarii (circled)

Observation data Epoch J2000 Equinox ICRS
- Constellation: Aquarius
- Right ascension: 22^{h} 35^{m} 21.38126^{s}
- Declination: −00° 07′ 02.9888″
- Apparent magnitude (V): 4.04

Characteristics
- Spectral type: B9IV-Vn or B8/9V
- U−B color index: −0.28
- B−V color index: −0.10

Astrometry
Radial velocity (R_{v})	–8.0 km/s
Proper motion (μ)	RA: +89.74 mas/yr Dec.: −56.10 mas/yr
Parallax (π)	19.43±0.25 mas
Distance	168 ± 2 ly (51.5 ± 0.7 pc)
Absolute magnitude (M_{V})	0.31±0.15

Details
Mass	2.96±0.04 M_{☉}
Radius	2.77±0.30 R_{☉}
Luminosity	102.8 L_{☉}
Surface gravity (log g)	4.02±0.04 cgs
Temperature	11,042±301 K
Rotational velocity (v sin i)	271±32 km/s
Age	65 Myr

Other designations
- Fenmu, η Aquarii, η Aqr, Eta Aqr, 62 Aquarii, AG−00 2882, BD−00 4384, FK5 850, HD 213998, HIP 111497, HR 8597, SAO 146181, PPM 181490

Database references
SIMBAD	data

Eta Aquarii, also named Fenmu /fɛnmuː/, is a star in the equatorial constellation of Aquarius. The star is visible to the naked eye with an apparent visual magnitude of 4.04. The distance to this star, as determined by parallax measurements, is about 168 light-years (52 parsecs). It is drifting closer to the Sun with a radial velocity of –8 km/s. Eta Aquarii is near the radiant of a meteor shower named the Eta Aquariids after it.

== Naming ==
Eta Aquarii is a Bayer designation that is Latinized from η Aquarii, and abbreviated Eta Aqr or η Aqr, respectively. This star, along with γ Aqr (Sadachbia), π Aqr and ζ Aqr, were al Aḣbiyah (الأخبية), the Tent.

In Chinese astronomy, 墳墓 (Fén Mù), meaning Tomb, refers to an asterism consisting of η Aquarii, γ Aquarii, ζ Aquarii, π Aquarii. Consequently, the Chinese name for η Aquarii itself is 墳墓三 (Fén Mù sān, English: the Third Star of Tomb.) The IAU Working Group on Star Names approved the name Fenmu for Eta Aquarii on 17 September 2026.

== Properties ==
The stellar classification of Eta Aquarii is B9IV-Vn, which may indicate that it is beginning to evolve away from the main sequence into a subgiant as the supply of hydrogen at its core becomes exhausted. It is 65 million years old and is spinning rapidly with a high projected rotational velocity of 271 km/s. This rotation is causing an equatorial bulge, giving the star an oblate figure with a 24% larger radius at the equator than at the poles. The Doppler effect from the rapid rotation is causing the absorption lines in the star's spectrum to blur, as indicated by the 'n' suffix in the star's classification. Eta Aquarii has an estimated 2.96 times the mass of the Sun and 2.8 times the Sun's radius. The star is radiating 103 times the luminosity of the Sun from its photosphere at an effective temperature of 11,042 K.
