= Pi Aquarii =

Star in the constellation Aquarius

π Aquarii
- Location of π Aquarii (circled)

Observation data Epoch J2000 Equinox ICRS
- Constellation: Aquarius
- Right ascension: 22^{h} 25^{m} 16.623^{s}
- Declination: +01° 22′ 38.63″
- Apparent magnitude (V): 4.42 - 4.87

Characteristics
- Spectral type: B1III-IVe
- U−B color index: −0.98
- B−V color index: −0.03
- Variable type: γ Cas

Astrometry
Radial velocity (R_{v})	+4.0 km/s
Proper motion (μ)	RA: +17.518 mas/yr Dec.: +2.563 mas/yr
Parallax (π)	2.9761±0.1129 mas
Distance	1,100 ± 40 ly (340 ± 10 pc)
Absolute magnitude (M_{V})	−2.09

Orbit
Period (P)	84.07±0.02 d
Semi-major axis (a)	≥ 0.96 AU
Eccentricity (e)	0.0 (fixed)
Inclination (i)	70±10°
Longitude of the node (Ω)	76.7±0.1°
Periastron epoch (T)	2,450,318.5±13.2 JD
Argument of periastron (ω) (secondary)	0.0 (fixed)°
Semi-amplitude (K_{1}) (primary)	16.7±0.2 km/s
Semi-amplitude (K_{2}) (secondary)	101.4±0.2 km/s

Details

A
Mass	11.0±0.9 M_{☉}
Radius	5.75±0.99 (equatorial); 5.00±0.81 (polar) R_{☉}
Luminosity	8,300+1,700 −1,400 L_{☉}
Surface gravity (log g)	4.08±0.10 (equatorial); 3.96±0.11 (polar) cgs
Temperature	22,400±1,400 (equatorial); 25,000±1,000 (polar) K
Metallicity [Fe/H]	−0.02 dex
Rotational velocity (v sin i)	271±13 km/s
Age	10.0±5.0 Myr

B
Mass	0.5–0.8 M_{☉}

Other designations
- π Aqr, 52 Aquarii, BD+00 4872, FK5 1585, HD 212571, HIP 110672, HR 8539, SAO 127520

Database references
SIMBAD	data

Pi Aquarii is a binary star system in the equatorial constellation of Aquarius. Its name is a Bayer designation that is Latinized from π Aquarii, and abbreviated Pi Aqr or π Aqr. This system has a combined apparent visual magnitude of +4.57, which is bright enough to be faintly visible to the naked eye. Based upon parallax measurements, it is located at a distance of approximately 1,100 light-years (340 parsecs) from the Sun. It is drifting further away with a radial velocity of +4 km/s.

== Properties ==
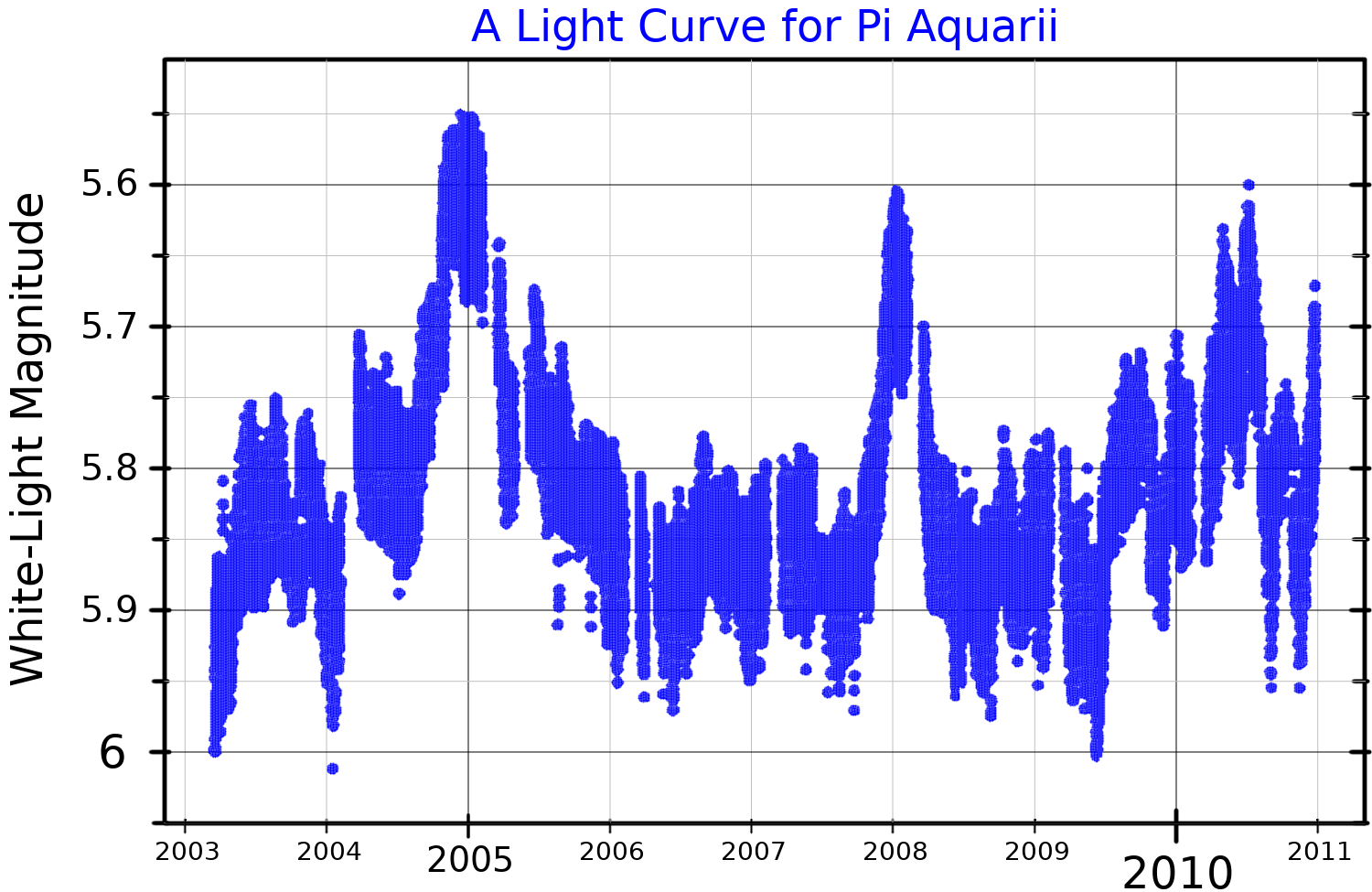
A white-light light curve for Pi Aquarii, adapted from Nazé et al. (2020)

This is a binary star system with a period of 84.1 days in a circular orbit. The primary component is a B1 giant or subgiant star. This is a massive star with 11 times the mass of the Sun, and is luminous with 8,300 times the Sun's luminosity. It is spinning rapidly with a projected rotational velocity of 271 km/s. The fast rotation make the star ellipsoidal rather than spherical, its radius at equator is 5.8 times that of the Sun, while its polar radius is 5.0 times solar. Gravity darkening make the temperature at the equator to be about 2,600 K colder than the temperature at the poles.

The secondary is likely a white dwarf star with a strong magnetic field and a mass of 0.5 to 0.8 M_{☉}. It is an X-ray source which is probably coming from accretion onto this object, making this an intermediate polar system. The accretion rate is (4–7)×10^{−11} M_{☉}·yr^{−1}.

Pi Aquarii is notable for having undergone a transition from a Be star (showing hydrogen emission lines) into an ordinary B-type star. It is classified as a Gamma Cassiopeiae type variable star and its brightness varies from magnitude +4.45 to +4.71; a range of 0.28. The dominant variability period, 83.8±0.8 days, is nearly the same as the orbital period. Pi Aquarii has a reasonable chance of becoming a supernova some day.

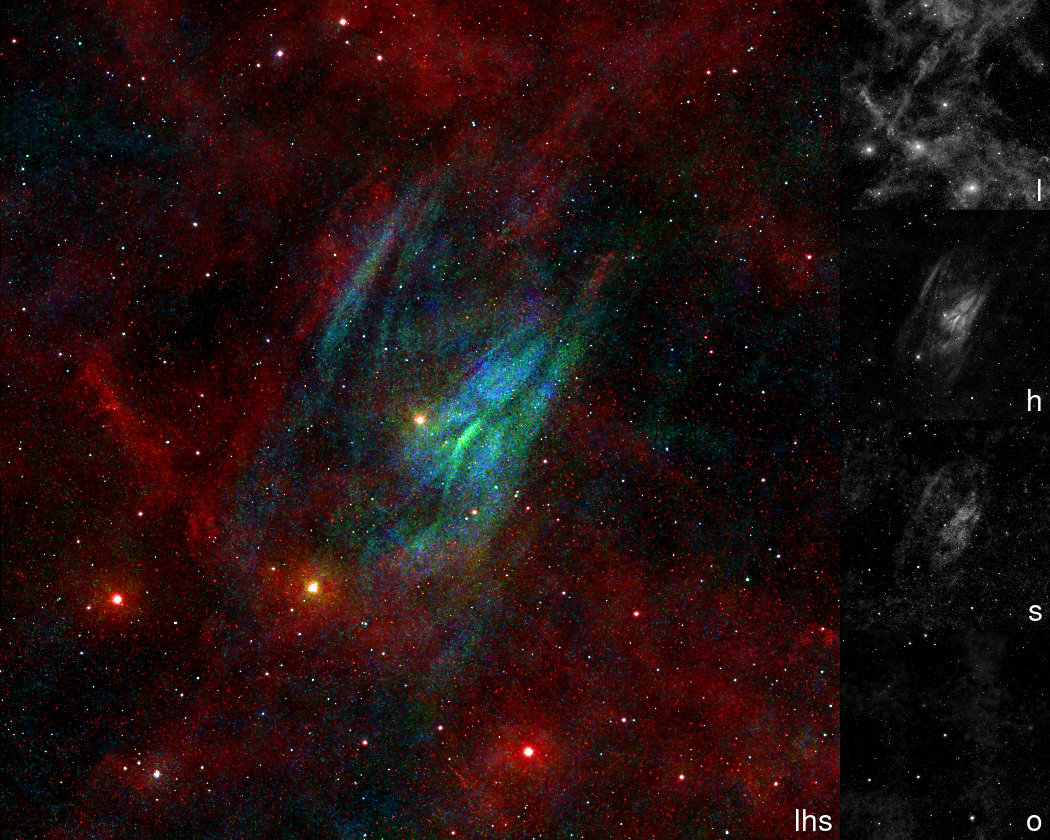
False-color image of the emission nebula (green and blue) surrounding π Aqr (image center), obtained by the Northern Sky Narrowband Survey.

Infrared images from WISE at a wavelength of 22 μm reveal a bow shock located approximately 100 arcseconds from the star (51,000 astronomical units at 340 pc) in the direction of its proper motion. In optical range, a weakly ionized emission nebula with a diameter of about 5° is visible (green to blue in the image). There also appears to be some interaction with the surrounding interstellar medium (red in the image). Notably, the rectangular shape of the nebula is not aligned with the current orientation of the circumstellar disk (see the infobox).

== In culture ==
Pi Aquarii was called Seat /ˈsiːæt/ by Grotius in the 17th century, but the name has rarely been used since.

In Chinese, 墳墓 (Fén Mù), meaning Tomb, refers to an asterism consisting of π Aquarii, γ Aquarii, ζ Aquarii, η Aquarii. Consequently, the Chinese name for π Aquarii itself is 墳墓四 (Fén Mù sì, English: the Fourth Star of Tomb.)

In the catalogue of stars in the Calendarium of Al Achsasi al Mouakket, this star was designated Wasat al Achbiya (وسط الأخبية - wasath al ahbiyah), which was translated into Latin as Media Tabernaculorum, meaning the middle of luck of the homes (tents). This star, along with γ Aqr (Sadachbia), ζ Aqr and η Aqr (Fenmu), were al Aḣbiyah (الأخبية), the Tent.
