= Aquarius (constellation) =

Zodiac constellation straddling the celestial equator

- Constellation
- List of stars in Aquarius
- Abbreviation: Aqr
- Genitive: Aquarii
- Pronunciation: /əˈkwɛəriəs/, genitive /əˈkwɛəriaɪ/
- Symbolism: the Water-Bearer
- Right ascension: 20^{h} 38^{m} 19.1706^{s}–23^{h} 56^{m} 23.5355^{s}
- Declination: 03.3256676°–−24.9040413°
- Area: 980 sq. deg. (10th)
- Main stars: 10, 22
- Bayer/Flamsteed stars: 97
- Stars brighter than 3.00^{m}: 2
- Stars within 10.00 pc (32.62 ly): 7
- Brightest star: β Aqr (Sadalsuud) (2.87^{m})
- Nearest star: EZ Aqr
- Messier objects: 3
- Meteor showers: March Aquariids; Eta Aquariids; Delta Aquariids; Iota Aquariids
- Bordering constellations: Pisces; Pegasus; Equuleus; Delphinus; Aquila; Capricornus; Piscis Austrinus; Sculptor; Cetus
- Visible at latitudes between +65° and −87°. Best visible at 21:00 (9 p.m.) during the month of October.

Aquarius is an equatorial constellation of the zodiac, between Capricornus and Pisces. Its name is Latin for "water-carrier" or "cup-carrier", and its traditional astrological symbol is (♒︎), a representation of water. Aquarius is one of the oldest of the recognized constellations along the zodiac. It was one of the 48 constellations listed by the 2nd-century astronomer Ptolemy, and it remains one of the 88 modern constellations.

At apparent magnitude 2.9, Beta Aquarii is the brightest star in the constellation.

== History and mythology ==
Aquarius is one of the oldest of the recognized constellations along the zodiac (the Sun's apparent path). It is found in a region often called the Sea due to its profusion of constellations with watery associations such as Cetus the whale, Pisces the fish, and Eridanus the river.

Aquarius is identified as GU.LA "The Great One" in the Babylonian star catalogues and represents the god Ea himself, who is commonly depicted holding an overflowing vase. The Babylonian star-figure appears on entitlement stones and cylinder seals from the second millennium. It contained the winter solstice in the Early Bronze Age. In Old Babylonian astronomy, Ea was the ruler of the southernmost quarter of the Sun's path, the "Way of Ea", corresponding to the period of 45 days on either side of winter solstice. Aquarius was also associated with the destructive floods that the Babylonians regularly experienced, and thus was negatively connoted. In Ancient Egypt astronomy, Aquarius was associated with the annual flood of the Nile; the banks were said to flood when Aquarius put his jar into the river, beginning spring.

In Greek tradition, the constellation came to be represented simply as a single vase from which a stream poured down to Piscis Austrinus. The name in the Hindu zodiac is likewise kumbha "water-pitcher".

In Greek mythology, Aquarius is sometimes associated with Deucalion, the son of Prometheus who built a ship with his wife Pyrrha to survive an imminent flood. They sailed for nine days before washing ashore on Mount Parnassus. Aquarius is also sometimes identified with beautiful Ganymede, a youth in Greek mythology and the son of Trojan king Tros, who was taken to Mount Olympus by Zeus to act as cup-carrier to the gods. Neighboring Aquila represents the eagle, under Zeus' command, that snatched the young boy; some versions of the myth indicate that the eagle was in fact Zeus transformed. One tradition, stated that he was carried off by Eos. Yet another figure associated with the water bearer is Cecrops I, a king of Athens who sacrificed water instead of wine to the gods.

=== Depictions ===
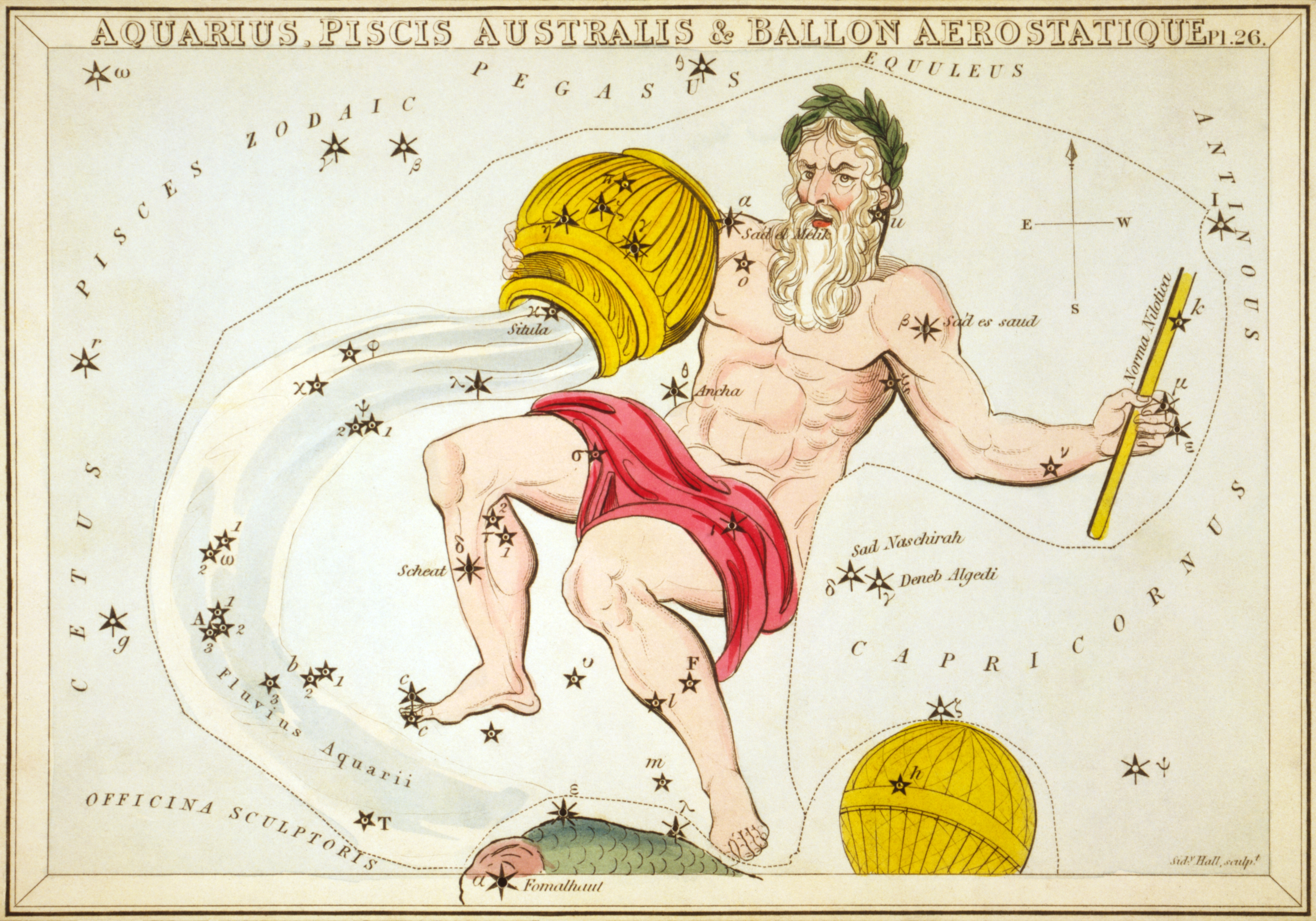
A representation of Aquarius printed in 1825 as part of Urania's Mirror (including the obsolete constellation Ballon Aerostatique to the south)

In the first century, Ptolemy's Almagest established the common Western depiction of Aquarius. It pours water in a stream of more than 20 stars terminating with Fomalhaut, now assigned solely to Piscis Austrinus. The water bearer's head is represented by 5th magnitude 25 Aquarii while his left shoulder is Beta Aquarii; his right shoulder and forearm are represented by Alpha and Gamma Aquarii respectively.

=== In Eastern astronomy ===
In Chinese astronomy, the stream of water flowing from the Water Jar was depicted as the "Army of Yu-Lin" (Yu-lim-kiun or Yulinjun, Hanzi: 羽林君). The name "Yu-lin" means "feathers and forests", referring to the numerous light-footed soldiers from the northern reaches of the empire represented by these faint stars. The constellation's stars were the most numerous of any Chinese constellation, numbering 45, the majority of which were located in modern Aquarius. The celestial army was protected by the wall Leibizhen (垒壁阵), which counted Iota, Lambda, Phi, and Sigma Aquarii among its 12 stars. 88, 89, and 98 Aquarii represent Fou-youe, the axes used as weapons and for hostage executions. Also in Aquarius is Loui-pi-tchin, the ramparts that stretch from 29 and 27 Piscium and 33 and 30 Aquarii through Phi, Lambda, Sigma, and Iota Aquarii to Delta, Gamma, Kappa, and Epsilon Capricorni. Similarly in the Hindu calendar Aquarius is depicted as Kumbha, and Kumbha, which means a pot or a jug, stands for the zodiac sign of Aquarius.

Near the border with Cetus, the axe Fuyue was represented by three stars; its position is disputed and may have instead been located in Sculptor. Tienliecheng also has a disputed position; the 13-star castle replete with ramparts may have possessed Nu and Xi Aquarii but may instead have been located south in Piscis Austrinus. The Water Jar asterism was seen to the ancient Chinese as the tomb, Fenmu. Nearby, the emperors' mausoleum Xiuliang stood, demarcated by Kappa Aquarii and three other collinear stars. Ku ("crying") and Qi ("weeping"), each composed of two stars, were located in the same region.

Three of the Chinese lunar mansions shared their name with constellations. Nu, also the name for the 10th lunar mansion, was a handmaiden represented by Epsilon, Mu, 3, and 4 Aquarii. The 11th lunar mansion shared its name with the constellation Xu ("emptiness"), formed by Beta Aquarii and Alpha Equulei; it represented a bleak place associated with death and funerals. Wei, the rooftop and 12th lunar mansion, was a V-shaped constellation formed by Alpha Aquarii, Theta Pegasi, and Epsilon Pegasi; it shared its name with two other Chinese constellations, in modern-day Scorpius and Aries.

== Features ==
=== Stars ===
Despite both its prominent position on the zodiac and its large size, Aquarius has no particularly bright stars, its four brightest stars being less bright than magnitude 2.8. (The Apparent Magnitude scale is reverse logarithmic, with increasingly bright objects having lower and lower (more negative) magnitudes.) Recent research has shown that there are several stars lying within its borders that possess planetary systems.

Aquarius showing the IAU boundaries and labels for its brightest stars. Astrophotograph by Eckhard Slawik, from NOIRLab's 88 Constellations project.

Aquarius is characterized by a Y-shaped asterism historically called "The Water Jar" that consists of Gamma, Pi, Eta, and Zeta Aquarii; it is nicknamed the "Steering Wheel" by some modern observers.

The two brightest stars, α Aquarii and β Aquarii, are luminous yellow supergiants, of spectral types G0Ib and G2Ib respectively, that were once hot blue-white B-class main sequence stars 5 to 9 times as massive as the Sun. The two are also moving through space perpendicular to the plane of the Milky Way. β Aquarii is the brightest star in Aquarius with apparent magnitude 2.91 – only slightly brighter than α Aquarii. It also has the proper name of Sadalsuud. Having cooled and swollen to around 50 times the Sun's diameter, it is around 2200 times as luminous as the Sun. It is around 6.4 times as massive as the Sun and around 56 million years old. Sadalsuud is 540 ± 20 light-years from Earth. α Aquarii, also known as Sadalmelik, has apparent magnitude 2.94 . It is 520 ± 20 light years distant from Earth, and is around 6.5 times as massive as the Sun, and 3000 times as luminous. It is 53 million years old.

γ Aquarii, also called Sadachbia, is a white main sequence star of spectral type star of spectral type A0V that is between 158 and 315 million years old and is around 2.5 times the Sun's mass (2.5 M_{☉}), and double its radius. Its magnitude is 3.85, and it is 164 ± 9 light years away, hence its luminosity is 50 L_{☉}. The name Sadachbia comes from the Arabic for "lucky stars of the tents", sa'd al-akhbiya.

δ Aquarii, also known as Skat or Scheat is a blue-white spectral type A2 star with apparent magnitude 3.27 and luminosity 105 L_{☉}.

ε Aquarii, also known as Albali, is a blue-white spectral type A1 star with apparent magnitude 3.77, absolute magnitude 1.2, and a luminosity of 28 L_{☉}.

ζ Aquarii is a spectral type F2 double star; both stars are white. In combination, they appear to be magnitude 3.6 with luminosity 50 L_{☉}. The primary has magnitude 4.53 and the secondary's magnitude is 4.31, but both have absolute magnitude 0.6. The system's orbital period is 760 years; currently the two components are moving farther apart.

θ Aquarii, sometimes called Ancha, is spectral type G8 with apparent magnitude 4.16 and an absolute magnitude 1.4.

κ Aquarii, also called Situla, has an apparent magnitude 5.03.

λ Aquarii, also called Shatabhisha, (proper name since 22 September 2025) is spectral type M2 with magnitude 3.74 and luminosity 120 L_{☉}.

ξ Aquarii, also called Bunda, is spectral type A7 with an apparent magnitude 4.69 and an absolute magnitude 2.4.

π Aquarii, also called Seat, is spectral type B0 with apparent magnitude 4.66 and absolute magnitude −4.1.

=== Planetary systems ===
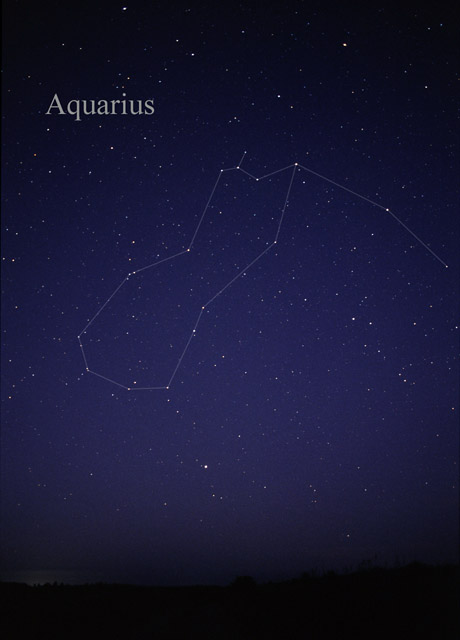
Aquarius in the night sky

Twelve exoplanet systems have been found in Aquarius as of 2013. Gliese 876, one of the nearest stars to Earth at a distance of 15 light-years, was the first red dwarf star to be found to possess a planetary system. It is orbited by four planets, including one terrestrial planet 6.6 times the mass of Earth. The planets vary in orbital period from 2 days to 124 days. 91 Aquarii is an orange giant star orbited by one planet, 91 Aquarii b. The planet's mass is 2.9 times the mass of Jupiter, and its orbital period is 182 days. Gliese 849 is a red dwarf star orbited by the first known long-period Jupiter-like planet, Gliese 849 b. The planet's mass is 0.99 times that of Jupiter and its orbital period is 1,852 days.

There are also less-prominent systems in Aquarius. WASP-6, a type G8 star of magnitude 12.4, is host to one exoplanet, WASP-6 b. The star is 307 parsecs from Earth and has a mass of 0.888 solar masses and a radius of 0.87 solar radii. WASP-6 b was discovered in 2008 by the transit method. It orbits its parent star every 3.36 days at a distance of 0.042 astronomical units (AU). It is 0.503 Jupiter masses but has a proportionally larger radius of 1.224 Jupiter radii. HD 206610, a K0 star located 194 parsecs from Earth, is host to one planet, HD 206610 b. The host star is larger than the Sun; more massive at 1.56 solar masses and larger at 6.1 solar radii. The planet was discovered by the radial velocity method in 2010 and has a mass of 2.2 Jupiter masses. It orbits every 610 days at a distance of 1.68 AU. Much closer to its sun is WASP-47 b, which orbits every 4.15 days only 0.052 AU from its sun, yellow dwarf (G9V) WASP-47. WASP-47 is close in size to the Sun, having a radius of 1.15 solar radii and a mass even closer at 1.08 solar masses. WASP-47 b was discovered in 2011 by the transit method, like WASP-6 b. It is slightly larger than Jupiter with a mass of 1.14 Jupiter masses and a radius of 1.15 Jupiter masses.

There are several more single-planet systems in Aquarius. HD 210277, a magnitude 6.63 yellow star located 21.29 parsecs from Earth, is host to one known planet: HD 210277 b. The 1.23 Jupiter mass planet orbits at nearly the same distance as Earth orbits the Sun—1.1 AU, though its orbital period is significantly longer at around 442 days. HD 210277 b was discovered earlier than most of the other planets in Aquarius, detected by the radial velocity method in 1998. The star it orbits resembles the Sun beyond their similar spectral class; it has a radius of 1.1 solar radii and a mass of 1.09 solar masses. HD 212771 b, a larger planet at 2.3 Jupiter masses, orbits host star HD 212771 at a distance of 1.22 AU. The star itself, barely below the threshold of naked-eye visibility at magnitude 7.6, is a G8IV (yellow subgiant) star located 131 parsecs from Earth. Though it has a similar mass to the Sun—1.15 solar masses—it is significantly less dense with its radius of 5 solar radii. Its lone planet was discovered in 2010 by the radial velocity method, like several other exoplanets in the constellation.

As of 2013, there were only two known multiple-planet systems within the bounds of Aquarius: the Gliese 876 and HD 215152 systems. The former is quite prominent; the latter has only two planets and has a host star farther away at 21.5 parsecs. The HD 215152 system consists of the planets HD 215152 b and HD 215152 c orbiting their K0-type, magnitude 8.13 sun. Both discovered in 2011 by the radial velocity method, the two tiny planets orbit very close to their host star. HD 215152 c is the larger at 0.0097 Jupiter masses (still significantly larger than the Earth, which weighs in at 0.00315 Jupiter masses); its smaller sibling is barely smaller at 0.0087 Jupiter masses. The error in the mass measurements (0.0032 and 0.0049 M_{J} respectively) is large enough to make this discrepancy statistically insignificant. HD 215152 c also orbits further from the star than HD 215152 b, 0.0852 AU compared to 0.0652.

In February 2017, NASA announced that the ultra-cool dwarf star TRAPPIST-1 in Aquarius has seven Earth-sized planets. Of these, as many as three may lie within the habitable zone, and may have liquid water on their surfaces. The discovery of the TRAPPIST-1 system is seen by astronomers as a significant step toward finding life beyond Earth.

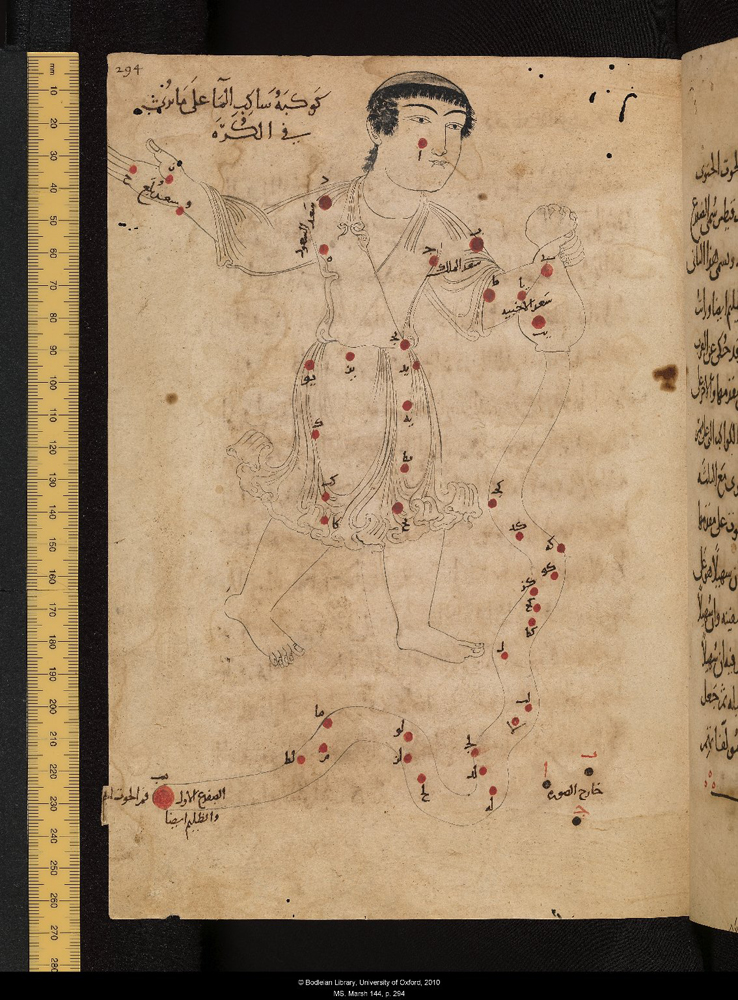
Aquarius from Al-Sufi's Book of Fixed Stars, dated 1009-10

=== Named stars ===
Name	Bayer designation	Origin	Meaning	Light Years
Sadalmelik	α	Arabic	the Lucky [Star] of the King	690
Sadalsuud	β	Arabic	the Luckiest of the Lucky (Stars)	540
Sadachbia	γ	Arabic	the Lucky (Stars) of the Tents	164
Skat	δ	Arabic	the Shin	113
Albali	ε	Arabic	the Swallower	244
Fenmu	η	Chinese	Tomb	168
Ancha	θ	Medieval Latin	the Haunch	191
Situla	κ	Latin	Bucket/Water Jar	214
Shatabhisha	λ	Sanskrit	a Hundred Physicians	365
Bunda	ξ	Persian	the Foundation	179
Lintangkumba	τ^{2}	Sanskrit-Indonesian	Asterism Jar	326

=== Deep-Sky Objects ===
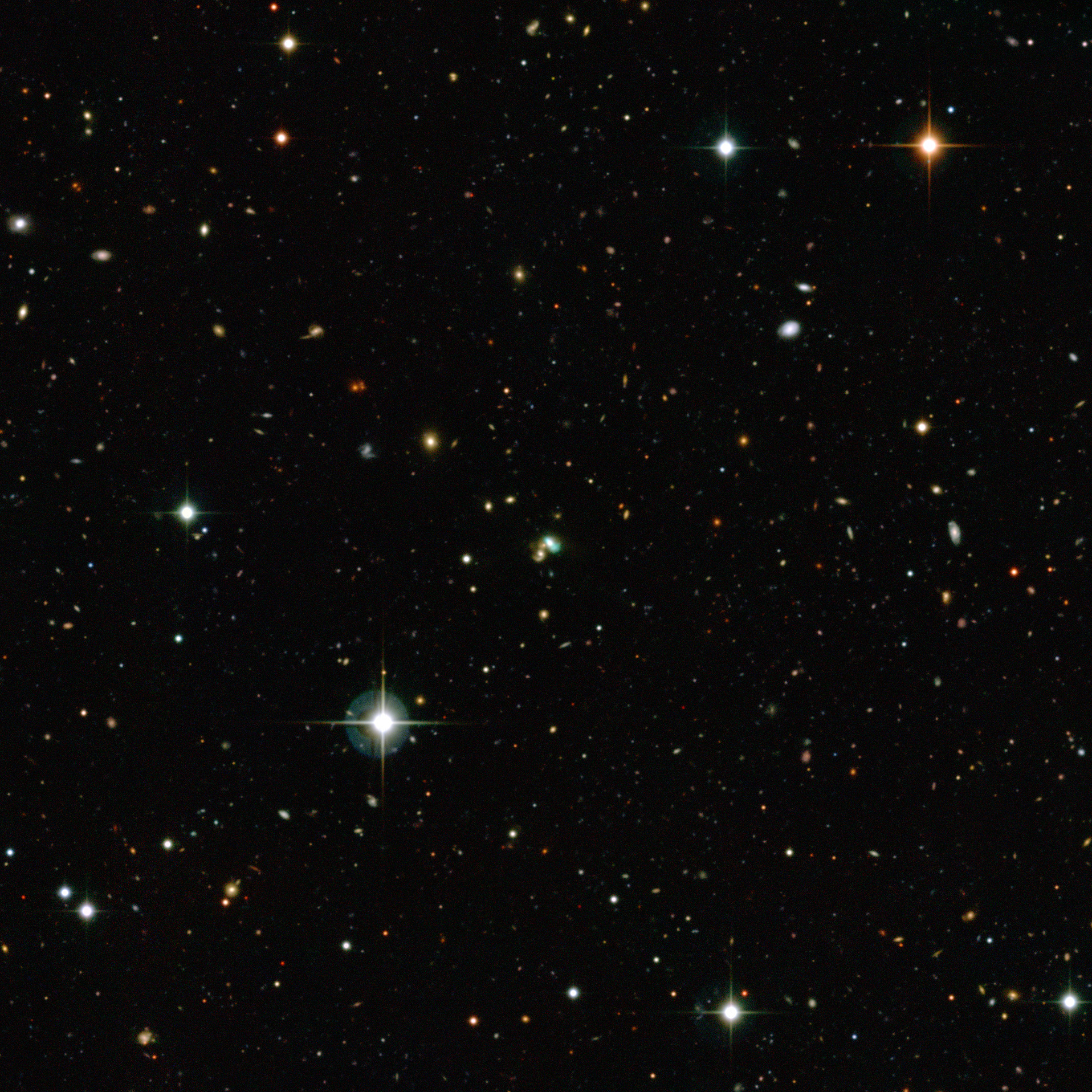
The green bean galaxy J2240 lies in the constellation of Aquarius

Because of its position away from the galactic plane, the majority of deep-sky objects in Aquarius are galaxies, globular clusters, and planetary nebulae. Aquarius contains three deep sky objects that are in the Messier catalog: the globular clusters Messier 2, Messier 72, and the asterism Messier 73. While M73 was originally catalogued as a sparsely populated open cluster, modern analysis indicates the 6 main stars are not close enough together to fit this definition, reclassifying M73 as an asterism. Two well-known planetary nebulae are also located in Aquarius: the Saturn Nebula (NGC 7009), to the southeast of μ Aquarii; and the famous Helix Nebula (NGC 7293), southwest of δ Aquarii.

M2, also catalogued as NGC 7089, is a rich globular cluster located approximately 37,000 light-years from Earth. At magnitude 6.5, it is viewable in small-aperture instruments, but a 100 mm aperture telescope is needed to resolve any stars. M72, also catalogued as NGC 6981, is a small 9th magnitude globular cluster located approximately 56,000 light-years from Earth. M73, also catalogued as NGC 6994, is an open cluster with highly disputed status.

Aquarius is also home to several planetary nebulae. NGC 7009, also known as the Saturn Nebula, is an 8th magnitude planetary nebula located 3,000 light-years from Earth. It was given its moniker by the 19th century astronomer Lord Rosse for its resemblance to the planet Saturn in a telescope; it has faint protrusions on either side that resemble Saturn's rings. It appears blue-green in a telescope and has a central star of magnitude 11.3. Compared to the Helix Nebula, another planetary nebula in Aquarius, it is quite small. NGC 7293, also known as the Helix Nebula, is the closest planetary nebula to Earth at a distance of 650 light-years. It covers 0.25 square degrees, making it also the largest planetary nebula as seen from Earth. However, because it is so large, it is only viewable as a very faint object, though it has a fairly high integrated magnitude of 6.0.

One of the visible galaxies in Aquarius is NGC 7727, of particular interest for amateur astronomers who wish to discover or observe supernovae. A spiral galaxy (type S), it has an integrated magnitude of 10.7 and is 3 by 3 arcseconds. NGC 7252 is a tangle of stars resulting from the collision of two large galaxies and is known as the Atoms-for-Peace galaxy because of its resemblance to a cartoon atom.

=== Meteor showers ===
There are three major meteor showers with radiants in Aquarius: the Eta Aquariids, the Delta Aquariids, and the Iota Aquariids.

The Eta Aquariids are the strongest meteor shower radiating from Aquarius. It peaks between 5 and 6 May with a rate of approximately 35 meteors per hour. Originally discovered by Chinese astronomers in 401, Eta Aquariids can be seen coming from the Water Jar beginning on 21 April and as late as 12 May. The parent body of the shower is Halley's Comet, a periodic comet. Fireballs are common shortly after the peak, approximately between 9 May and 11 May. The normal meteors appear to have yellow trails.

The Delta Aquariids is a double radiant meteor shower that peaks first on 29 July and second on 6 August. The first radiant is located in the south of the constellation, while the second radiant is located in the northern circlet of Pisces asterism. The southern radiant's peak rate is about 20 meteors per hour, while the northern radiant's peak rate is about 10 meteors per hour.

The Iota Aquariids is a fairly weak meteor shower that peaks on 6 August, with a rate of approximately 8 meteors per hour.

== Astrology ==
As of 2002, the Sun appears in the constellation Aquarius from 16 February to 12 March. In tropical astrology, the Sun is considered to be in the sign Aquarius from 20 January to 19 February, and in sidereal astrology, from 15 February to 14 March.

Aquarius is also associated with the Age of Aquarius, a concept popular in 1960s counterculture and Medieval Alchemy. The date of the start of The Age of Aquarius is a topic of much debate.
