= HD 212771 b =

Extrasolar planet orbiting the star HD 212771 in the constellation Aquarius

HD 212771 b / Victoriapeak
Discovery
- Discovered by: Johnson et al.
- Discovery site: Keck Observatory
- Discovery date: 2010-03-17
- Detection method: Doppler spectroscopy

Orbital characteristics
- Semi-major axis: 1.19±0.13 AU
- Eccentricity: 0.076±0.051
- Orbital period (sidereal): 380.7±1.4 d
- Time of perihelion: 2454920±52 JD
- Argument of perihelion: 29±65 º
- Semi-amplitude: 50.0±5.8 m/s
- Star: HD 212771

Physical characteristics
- Mass: ≥2.39±0.27 M_{J}

HD 212771 b is an extrasolar planet orbiting the G-type star HD 212771 approximately 364 light years away in the constellation Aquarius.

== Nomenclature ==
HD 212771 b is named Victoriapeak. The name was selected in the NameExoWorlds campaign by Hong Kong, during the 100th anniversary of the IAU. It is named after the Victoria Peak, the highest point on Hong Kong Island. The host star HD 212771 is named Lionrock, after the Lion Rock.

== Properties ==
=== Orbit ===
HD 212771 b's orbit period and distance are similar to Earth's, with the values being 380 days and 1.19 AU respectively. It orbits in a nearly perfect circular orbit compared to long period gas giants.

=== Characteristics ===
Size comparison
Jupiter	HD 212771 / Victoriapeak
Jupiter	Exoplanet

Due to the unknown orbital parameters, the planets true mass is not known, with a minimum of 2.39 times Jupiter's mass. HD 212771 b's radius is unknown, so NASA's Eyes on Exoplanets gives an estimate of 1.18 times the radius.
