= Rho Sagittarii =

The Bayer designation Rho Sagittarii (Rho Sgr, ρ Sagittarii, ρ Sgr) is shared by two stars in the constellation Sagittarius.

- ρ^{1} Sagittarii
- ρ^{2} Sagittarii

The two stars are separated by 0.46° in the sky. Because they are close to the ecliptic, they can be occulted by the Moon and, very rarely, by planets. The next occultation of ρ^{1} Sagittarii by a planet will take place on 23 February 2046, when it will be occulted by Venus.

In Chinese, 建 (Jiàn), meaning Establishment, refers to an asterism consisting of ρ^{1} Sagittarii ξ^{1} Sagittarii, ο Sagittarii, π Sagittarii, 43 Sagittarii and υ Sagittarii. Consequently, ρ^{1} Sagittarii itself is known as 建五 (Jiàn wǔ, English: the Fifth Star of Establishment.)
