= Planetary transits and occultations =

Event when planets are seen to pass one another

In astronomy, planetary transits and occultations occur when a planet passes in front of another object, as seen by an observer. The occulted object may be a distant star, but in rare cases it may be another planet, in which case the event is called a mutual planetary occultation or mutual planetary transit, depending on the relative apparent diameters of the objects.

The word "transit" refers to cases where the nearer object appears smaller than the more distant object. Cases where the nearer object appears larger and completely hides the more distant object are known as occultations. In Vedic astrology, a planetary transit is called a 'gochar'. It plays an important role while studying someone's kundli.

== Mutual planetary occultations and transits ==
Mutual occultations or transits of planets are extremely rare. The most recent event occurred on 3 January 1818, and the next will occur on 22 November 2065. Both involve the same two planets: Venus and Jupiter.

=== Historical observations ===
An occultation of Mars by Venus on 13 October 1590 was observed by the German astronomer Michael Maestlin at Heidelberg. The 1737 event (see list below) was observed by John Bevis at Greenwich Observatory – it is the only detailed account of a mutual planetary occultation. A transit of Mars across Jupiter on 12 September 1170 was observed by the monk Gervase at Canterbury, and by Chinese astronomers.

=== Future events ===
The next time a mutual planetary transit or occultation will happen (as seen from Earth) will be on 22 November 2065 at about 12:43 UTC, when Venus is near superior conjunction (with an angular diameter of 10.6") will transit in front of Jupiter (with an angular diameter of 30.9"); however, this will take place only 8° west of the Sun, and will therefore not be visible to the unaided/unprotected eye. Before transiting Jupiter, Venus will occult Jupiter's moon Ganymede at around 11:24 UTC as seen from some southernmost parts of Earth. Parallax will cause actual observed times to vary by a few minutes, depending on the precise location of the observer.

=== List of mutual planetary occultations and transits ===
There are only 18 mutual planetary transits and occultations as seen from Earth between 1700 and 2200. There is a very long break of events between 1818 and 2065.

- 19 September 1702 – Jupiter occults Neptune (pre-discovery)
- 20 July 1705 – Mercury transits Jupiter
- 14 July 1708 – Mercury occults Uranus (pre-discovery)

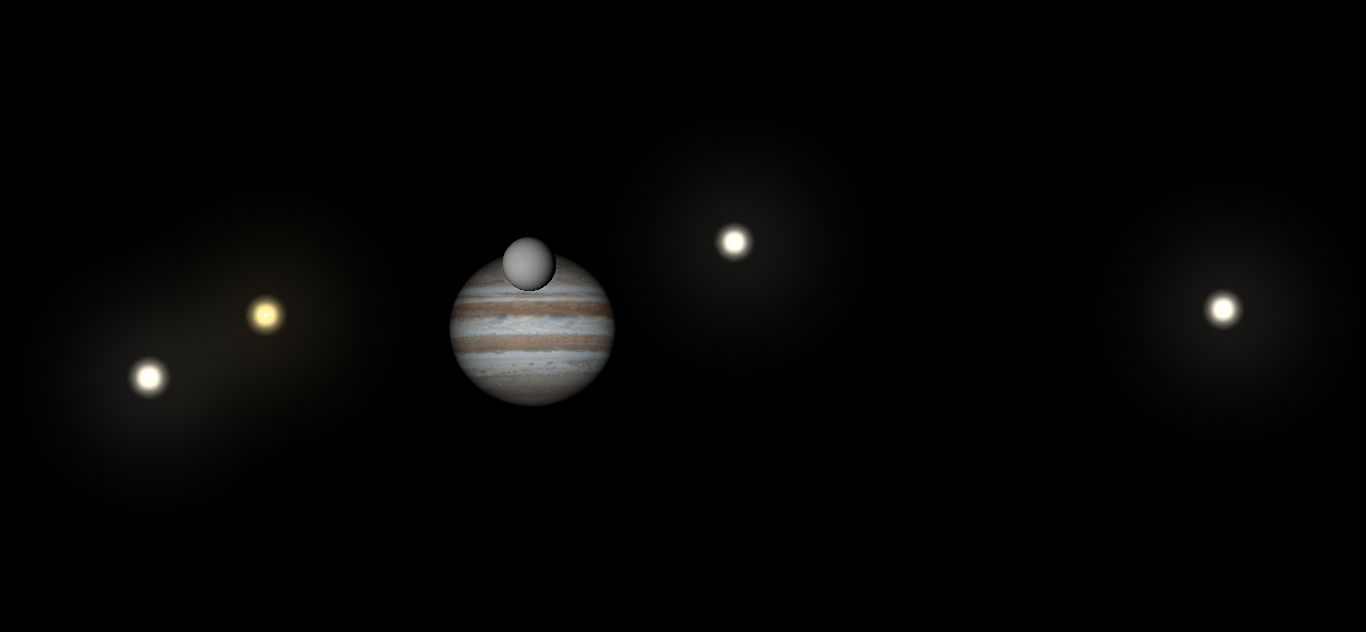
A simulation of Venus transiting Jupiter, as it did on 3rd of January, 1818.

- 4 October 1708 – Mercury transits Jupiter
- 28 May 1737 – Venus occults Mercury
- 29 August 1771 – Venus transits Saturn
- 21 July 1793 – Mercury occults Uranus
- 9 December 1808 – Mercury transits Saturn
- 3 January 1818 – Venus transits Jupiter
- 22 November 2065 – Venus transits Jupiter
- 15 July 2067 – Mercury occults Neptune
- 11 August 2079 – Mercury occults Mars
- 27 October 2088 – Mercury transits Jupiter
- 7 April 2094 – Mercury transits Jupiter
- 21 August 2104 – Venus occults Neptune
- 14 September 2123 – Venus transits Jupiter
- 29 July 2126 – Mercury occults Mars
- 3 December 2133 – Venus occults Mercury

=== Mutual occultations, transits, and eclipses of the moons of Jupiter and Saturn ===
Twice during the orbital cycles of Jupiter and Saturn, the equatorial (and satellite) planes of those planets are aligned with Earth's orbital plane, resulting in a series of mutual occultations and eclipses between the moons of these giant planets. The terms eclipse, occultation, and transit are also used to describe these events. A satellite of Jupiter (for example) may be eclipsed (i.e. made dimmer because it moves into Jupiter's shadow), occulted (i.e. hidden from view because Jupiter lies on our line of sight), or may transit (i.e. pass in front of) Jupiter's disk (see also Solar eclipses on Jupiter).

== Other planetary occultations ==
This table is another compilation of occultations and transits of bright stars and planets by solar planets. These events are not visible everywhere the occulting body and the occulted body are above the skyline. Some events are barely visible, because they take place in close proximity to the Sun.

Day	Time (UT)	Foreground planet	Background object	Elongation
9 December 1802	07:36	Mercury	Acrab	16.2° West
9 December 1808	20:34	Mercury	Saturn	20.3° West
22 December 1810	06:32	Venus	Xi-2 Sagittarii	11.1° East
3 January 1818	21:52	Venus	Jupiter	16.5° West
11 July 1825	09:10	Venus	Delta-1 Tauri	44.4° West
11 July 1837	12:50	Mercury	Eta Geminorum	17.8° West
9 May 1841	19:35	Venus	17 Tauri	9.2° East
27 September 1843	18:00	Venus	Eta Virginis	3.2° West
16 December 1850	11:28	Mercury	Lambda Sagittarii	10.2° East
22 May 1855	05:04	Venus	Epsilon Geminorum	37.4° East
30 June 1857	00:25	Saturn	Delta Geminorum	8.4° East
5 December 1865	14:20	Mercury	Lambda Sagittarii	21.0° East
28 February 1876	05:13	Jupiter	Acrab	97.6° West
7 June 1881	20:54	Mercury	Epsilon Geminorum	21.2° East
9 December 1906	17:40	Venus	Acrab	14.9° West
27 July 1910	02:53	Venus	Eta Geminorum	31.0° West
24 December 1937	18:38	Mercury	Omicron Sagittarii	11.6° East
10 June 1940	02:21	Mercury	Epsilon Geminorum	20.1° East
25 October 1947	01:45	Venus	Zuben-el-genubi (Alpha-2 Librae)	13.5° East
7 July 1959	14:30	Venus	Regulus	44.5° East
27 September 1965	15:30	Mercury	Eta Virginis	2.6° West
13 May 1971	20:00	Jupiter	Beta Scorpii (both components)	169.5° West
8 April 1976	01:00	Mars	Epsilon Geminorum	81.3° East
17 November 1981	15:27	Venus	Nunki	47.0° East
19 November 1984	01:32	Venus	Lambda Sagittarii	39.2° East
3 July 1989		Saturn	28 Sagittarii	unknown to unknown 25.3.2012
4 December 2015	16:14	Mercury	Theta Ophiuchi	9.6° East
17 February 2035	15:19	Venus	Pi Sagittarii	42.1° West
1 October 2044	22:00	Venus	Regulus	38.9° West
23 February 2046	19:24	Venus	Rho-1 Sagittarii	45.4° West
10 November 2052	07:20	Mercury	Zuben-el-genubi (Alpha-2 Librae)	2.8° West
22 November 2065	12:45	Venus	Jupiter	7.9° West
15 July 2067	11:56	Mercury	Neptune	18.4° West
11 August 2069	20:25	Venus	Zavijava	38.4° East
3 October 2078	22:00	Mars	Theta Ophiuchi	71.4° East
11 August 2079	01:30	Mercury	Mars	11.3° West
27 October 2088	13:43	Mercury	Jupiter	4.7° West
7 April 2094	10:48	Mercury	Jupiter	1.8° West
