= Arkab =

Arkab may refer to:

- Mohamed Arkab (born 1966), Algerian engineer and minister
- USS Arkab, a Crater-class cargo ship

== See also ==
- Arkab Posterior, a star in the zodiac constellation of Sagittarius
- Arkab Prior, a binary star system in the zodiac constellation of Sagittarius
