= Beta Sagittarii =

Beta Sagittarii (β Sagittarii, abbreviated Beta Sgr, β Sgr) is the common designation shared by two star systems in the constellation of Sagittarius, themselves designated β^{1} Sagittarii (itself a probable binary star) and β^{2} Sagittarii. The two systems are separated by 0.36° in the sky.

- β^{1} Sagittarii
- β^{2} Sagittarii

β^{1} Sagittarii's two components are designated β^{1} Sagittarii A, also named Arkab Prior, and β^{1} Sagittarii B (sometimes designated Arkab Prior A and B). β^{2} Sagittarii is named Arkab Posterior. Beta Sagittarii is also referred to by the traditional name Arkab.

== Nomenclature ==
β Sagittarii (Latinised to Beta Sagittariii) is the groups's Bayer designation; β^{1} and β^{2} Sagittarii, those of its two constituents. The designations of β^{1}'s components – β^{1} Sagittarii A and B – derive from the convention used by the Washington Multiplicity Catalog (WMC) for multiple star systems, and adopted by the International Astronomical Union (IAU).

The system's traditional name Arkab derives from the Arabic عرقوب ^{c}arqūb meaning Achilles Tendon. The two constituents bore the traditional names Arkab Prior and Arkab Posterior since β^{1} leads β^{2} (or β^{2} follows β^{1}) across the sky. In 2016, the International Astronomical Union organized a Working Group on Star Names (WGSN) to catalogue and standardize proper names for stars. The WGSN states that in the case of multiple stars the name should be understood to be attributed to the brightest component by visual brightness. The WGSN approved the names Arkab Prior and Arkab Posterior for β^{1} Sagittarii A and β^{2} Sagittarii on 5 October 2016 and they are now so entered in the IAU Catalog of Star Names.

β^{1} and β^{2} Sagittarii, together with Alpha Sagittarii, were Al Ṣuradain (الصردين), the two Surad, "desert birds".

In Chinese, 天淵 (Tiān Yuān), meaning Celestial Spring, refers to an asterism consisting of β^{1} Sagittarii, β^{2} Sagittarii, and Alpha Sagittarii, Consequently, β^{1} and β^{2} Sagittarii themselves are known as 天淵一 (Tiān Yuān yī, English: the First Star of Celestial Spring.) and 天淵二 (Tiān Yuān èr, English: the Second Star of Celestial Spring.)

=== Namesakes ===
USS Arkab (AK-130) was a United States Navy Crater-class cargo ship named after the system.
