= Omicron Sagittarii =

Star in the constellation Sagittarius

- Location of ο Sagittarii (circled)

Observation data Epoch J2000.0 Equinox ICRS
- Constellation: Sagittarius
- Right ascension: 19^{h} 04^{m} 40.98177^{s}
- Declination: −21° 44′ 29.3845″
- Apparent magnitude (V): +3.771

Characteristics
- Evolutionary stage: horizontal branch
- Spectral type: G9IIIb
- B−V color index: +1.012±0.008

Astrometry
Radial velocity (R_{v})	+26.1±0.6 km/s
Proper motion (μ)	RA: +76.35±0.31 mas/yr Dec.: −58.12±0.18 mas/yr
Parallax (π)	22.96±0.24 mas
Distance	142 ± 1 ly (43.6 ± 0.5 pc)
Absolute magnitude (M_{V})	0.625

Details
Mass	1.80 M_{☉}
Radius	12.09+0.29 −0.17 R_{☉}
Luminosity	66.7±1.1 L_{☉}
Surface gravity (log g)	2.66 cgs
Temperature	4,744+34 −57 K
Metallicity [Fe/H]	−0.04 dex
Age	2.39 Gyr

Other designations
- Alqiladah, ο Sgr, 39 Sagittarii, BD−21°5237, GC 26224, HD 177241, HIP 93683, HR 7217, SAO 187643, PPM 269274, ADS 11996, CCDM J19047-2144A, WDS J19047-2144A

Database references
SIMBAD	data

Omicron Sagittarii, also named Alqiladah, is a single star in the constellation Sagittarius. It is yellow in hue and visible to the naked eye with an apparent visual magnitude of +3.77. The distance to this star is approximately 142 light years based on parallax. It is drifting further away from the Sun with a radial velocity of +26 km/s, having come to within 86 ly around a million years ago.

== Observation ==
This object is positioned 0.86 degrees north of the ecliptic, so ο Sagittarii can be occulted by the Moon and very rarely by planets. The last occultation by a planet took place on 24 December 1937, when it was occulted by Mercury. It was almost eclipsed by the sun, which occupies a mean, rounded, half of one degree of the sky, on 5 January. Thus the star can be viewed the whole night, crossing the sky, in early July.

== Nomenclature ==
ο Sagittarii, Latinized as Omicron Sagittarii, is the star's Bayer designation. It is occasionally called by the name Manubrium, usually in an astrological context. This star is part of the Arabic asterism al-Qilāda (القِلادَة) "the necklace"; the IAU Working Group on Star Names adopted the name Alqiladah for this star on 13 August 2026.

In Chinese astronomy, 建 (Jiàn), meaning Establishment, refers to an asterism consisting of ο Sagittarii ξ² Sagittarii, π Sagittarii, 43 Sagittarii, ρ¹ Sagittarii and υ Sagittarii. Consequently, the Chinese name for ο Sagittarii itself is 建二 (Jiàn èr, English: the Second Star of Establishment.)

== Properties ==
This is an aging giant star with a stellar classification of G9IIIb. It is classified as a red clump giant, suggesting it is on the horizontal branch undergoing core helium fusion. The star is 2.39 billion years old with 1.80 times the mass of the Sun. It has expanded to 12 times the radius of the Sun and is radiating 67 times the Sun's luminosity from its swollen photosphere at an effective temperature of 4,744 K.

It has a faint, magnitude 13.8 companion, designated component B and positioned 38.4″ away along a position angle of 252°, as of 2010.
