= Xi Sagittarii =

Star in the constellation Sagittarius

The Bayer designation Xi Sagittarii (ξ Sagittarii) is shared by two stars, ξ^{1} Sagittarii and ξ² Sagittarii, in the constellation Sagittarius, separated by 0.46° in the sky. Because they are close to the ecliptic, they can be occulted by the Moon and, very rarely, by planets. The last occultation of ξ² Sagittarii by a planet took place on 22 December 1810, when it was occulted by Venus.

- ξ^{1} Sagittarii
- ξ^{2} Sagittarii
