= Warren Stone =

Warren Stone may refer to:

- Warren Stone (musician)
- Warren Stanford Stone (1860–1925), railway engineer who headed the Brotherhood of Locomotive Engineers, 1903–1925
- SS Warren Stone, a liberty ship

== See also ==
- Charles Warren Stone, Pennsylvania politician
