= Upsilon Sagittarii =

Binary star system in the constellation Sagittarius

- Location of υ Sgr (circled)

Observation data Epoch J2000 Equinox ICRS
- Constellation: Sagittarius
- Right ascension: 19^{h} 21^{m} 43.62284^{s}
- Declination: −15° 57′ 18.0625″
- Apparent magnitude (V): 4.61

Characteristics
- Spectral type: A2 Ia + B2 Vpe
- U−B color index: −0.53
- B−V color index: +0.10
- Variable type: PV Tel (β Lyr?)

Astrometry
Radial velocity (R_{v})	8.9 km/s
Proper motion (μ)	RA: 1.34 mas/yr Dec.: −6.25 mas/yr
Parallax (π)	1.83±0.23 mas
Distance	approx. 1,800 ly (approx. 550 pc)
Absolute magnitude (M_{V})	−4.73 / −1.14

Orbit
Period (P)	137.9 days
Semi-major axis (a)	270.8 R_{☉}
Eccentricity (e)	0
Inclination (i)	50°
Semi-amplitude (K_{1}) (primary)	49.6 km/s
Semi-amplitude (K_{2}) (secondary)	29.7 km/s

Details

A
Mass	0.3+0.5 −0.2 M_{☉}
Radius	23+7 −6 R_{☉}
Luminosity	4,700 L_{☉}
Surface gravity (log g)	1.2+0.1 −0.2 cgs
Temperature	12,300 K
Metallicity [Fe/H]	−0.2 dex
Rotational velocity (v sin i)	≤10 km/s
Age	52 Myr

B
Mass	6.8±0.8 M_{☉}
Radius	2.2±0.3 R_{☉}
Luminosity	1,300 L_{☉}
Temperature	23,000 K
Rotational velocity (v sin i)	250±20 km/s

Other designations
- υ Sagittarii, υ Sgr, Upsilon Sgr, 46 Sagittarii, BD−16°5283, FK5 727, GC 26697, HD 181615, HD 181616, HIP 95176, HR 7342, PPM 235885, SAO 162518

Database references
SIMBAD	data

Upsilon Sagittarii (Upsilon Sgr, υ Sagittarii, υ Sgr) is a spectroscopic binary star system in the constellation Sagittarius. Upsilon Sagittarii is the prototypical hydrogen-deficient binary (HdB), and one of only four such systems known. The unusual spectrum of hydrogen-deficient binaries has made stellar classification of Upsilon Sagittarii difficult.

== System ==
υ Sgr is a binary system with an orbital period of 137.939 days and is approximately 1,800 light years from Earth. The primary star dominates the visible radiation and spectrum, but the secondary is hotter and more massive. Some sources consider the "invisible" component to be the primary on the basis of its mass. There is also a disc of material being stripped from the primary and transferring material to the secondary, but no eclipses

The system is classified as a single-lined spectroscopic binary, but high excitation lines from the secondary can be detected in the ultraviolet. Radial velocity variations were discovered in 1899, The first orbit was calculated in 1914, reasonably close to modern understanding of the system. Analysis of optical interferometry finds the two stars to be separated by 1.3 mas and have a difference in brightness of about 3.5 magnitudes.

== Properties ==
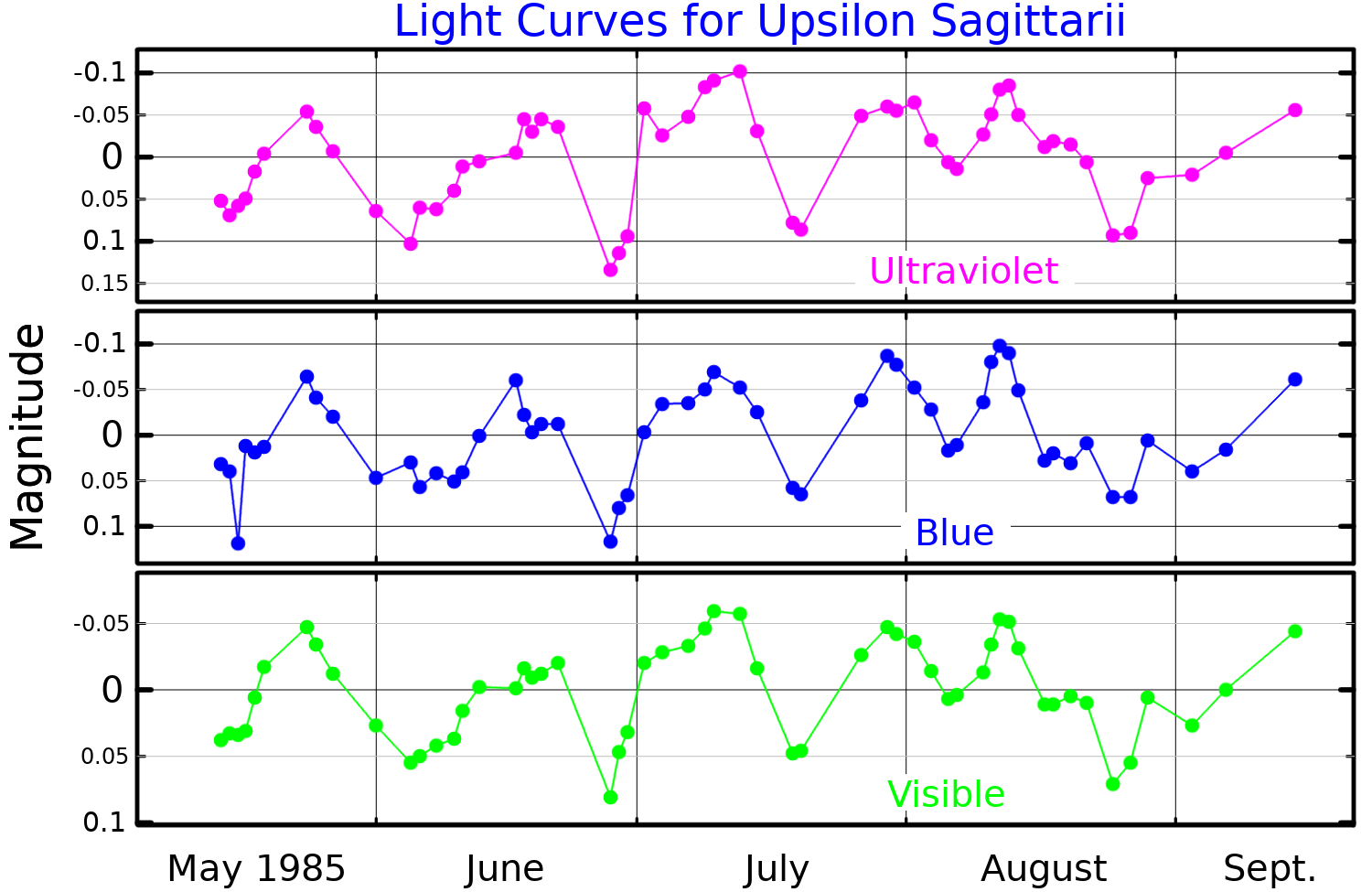
Light curves for Upsilon Sagittarii, adapted from Malcolm and Bell (1986)

The primary component appears as an A type supergiant, although published spectral types vary from F2p to B5II. Contrasting components in the spectrum may originate from disc material, polar jets, or the star itself. The low mass and unusual chemical composition are also thought to produce misleading spectral calibrations, with the star not as massive or as luminous as the Ia luminosity class would suggest.

The visible component is a helium star, almost entirely deficient of hydrogen. It has also been described as a neon star, due to the very high relative levels of that element. It has been stripped of its outer hydrogen layers after it expanded away from the main sequence. It is thought to have originated as a main sequence star with around 8 M_{☉}, expanded when it exhausted its core hydrogen, and now only 2.5 M_{☉} remains, highly inflated and giving the appearance of a supergiant star. Other estimates give higher masses, as much as 5.45 M_{☉} and 8.56 M_{☉} at the known inclination of 50°.

The supergiant component is also classified as an PV Telescopii variable, although it was originally catalogued as an eclipsing binary. It shows apparent magnitude fluctuations between +4.51 and +4.65 with a period of approximately 20 days.

The companion is more massive than the supergiant primary, but so dim at visible frequencies as to be undetectable, although it can be seen in ultraviolet spectra. It is thought to be a B-type main sequence star accreting mass from the primary.

== Naming ==
υ Sagittarii has two entries in the Henry Draper Catalogue, HD 181615 and HD 181616.

In Chinese, 建 (Jiàn), meaning Establishment, refers to an asterism consisting of υ Sagittarii, ξ² Sagittarii, ο Sagittarii, π Sagittarii, 43 Sagittarii and ρ¹ Sagittarii. Consequently, the Chinese name for υ Sagittarii itself is 建六 (Jiàn liù, English: the Sixth Star of Establishment.)
