= Pi Sagittarii =

Triple star system in the constellation Sagittarius

π Sagittarii
- Location of π Sagittarii (circled)

Observation data Epoch J2000.0 Equinox ICRS
- Constellation: Sagittarius
- Right ascension: 19^{h} 09^{m} 45.83293^{s}
- Declination: −21° 01′ 25.0103″
- Apparent magnitude (V): +2.89

Characteristics
- Spectral type: F2 II
- U−B color index: +0.22
- B−V color index: +0.35

Astrometry
Radial velocity (R_{v})	−9.8 km/s
Proper motion (μ)	RA: −1.36 mas/yr Dec.: −36.45 mas/yr
Parallax (π)	6.2410±0.2868 mas
Distance	520 ± 20 ly (160 ± 7 pc)
Absolute magnitude (M_{V})	−3.08

Details
Mass	5.9±0.3 M_{☉}
Radius	28.4 R_{☉}
Luminosity	1,285 L_{☉}
Surface gravity (log g)	2.21±0.05 cgs
Temperature	6,590±50 K
Rotational velocity (v sin i)	30 km/s
Age	67 Myr

Other designations
- Albaldah, π Sgr, 41 Sgr, BD−21°5275, CCDM J19098-2101AB, FK5 720, GC 26386, HD 178524, HIP 94141, HR 7264, SAO 187756, WDS J19098-2101AB

Database references
SIMBAD	data

Pi Sagittarii (π Sagittarii, abbreviated Pi Sgr, π Sgr) is a triple star system in the zodiac constellation of Sagittarius. It has an apparent visual magnitude of +2.89, bright enough to be readily seen with the naked eye. Based upon parallax measurements, it is roughly 510 light-years (160 parsecs) from the Sun.

The three components are designated Pi Sagittarii A (officially named Albaldah /ælˈbɔːldə/, from the traditional name of the entire system), B and C.

== Nomenclature ==
π Sagittarii (Latinised to Pi Sagittarii) is the system's Bayer designation. The designations of the three constituents as Pi Sagittarii A, B and C, derive from the convention used by the Washington Multiplicity Catalog (WMC) for multiple star systems, and adopted by the International Astronomical Union (IAU).

The system bore the traditional name Albaldah, which comes from the Arabic بلدة bálda 'the town'. In 2016, the IAU organized a Working Group on Star Names (WGSN) to catalog and standardize proper names for stars. The WGSN decided to attribute proper names to individual stars rather than entire multiple systems. It approved the name Albaldah for the component Pi Sagittarii A on 5 September 2017 and it is now so included in the List of IAU-approved Star Names.

In the catalogue of stars in the Calendarium of Al Achsasi al Mouakket, this star was designated Nir al Beldat, which was translated into Latin as Lucida Oppidi, meaning 'the brightest of the town'.

This system, together with Zeta Sagittarii and Sigma Sagittarii may have been the Akkadian Gu-shi-rab‑ba, 'the Yoke of the Sea'.

In Chinese, 建 (Jiàn), meaning Establishment, refers to an asterism consisting of Pi Sagittarii, Xi^{2} Sagittarii, Omicron Sagittarii, 43 Sagittarii, Rho^{1} Sagittarii and Upsilon Sagittarii. Consequently, the Chinese name for Pi Sagittarii itself is 建三 (Jiàn sān, English: the Third Star of Establishment).

== Properties ==
The spectrum of the system's primary, Pi Sagitarii A, matches a stellar classification of F2 II. The 'II' luminosity class is for a bright giant star that has exhausted the hydrogen at its core and has followed an evolutionary track away from the main sequence of stars like the Sun. Because it has nearly six times the mass of the Sun, it reached this stage in a mere 67 million years. The outer envelope is radiating energy at an effective temperature of about 6,590 K, giving it the yellow-white hue of an F-type star.

Pi Sagittarii A has two nearby companions. The first is separated by 0.1 arcseconds, or at least 13 AU. The second is 0.4 arcseconds away, which is 40 AU or more. Nothing is known about the orbits of these stars.

Being 1.43 degrees north of the ecliptic, Pi Sagittarii can be occulted by the Moon, and, very rarely, by planets. The next occultation by a planet will be by Venus on 17 February 2035 over part of Antarctica and Southern Australia.
