= Xi2 Sagittarii =

Star in the constellation Sagittarius

Xi^{2} Sagittarii
- Location of ξ^{2} Sagittarii (circled)

Observation data Epoch J2000.0 Equinox J2000.0 (ICRS)
- Constellation: Sagittarius
- Right ascension: 18^{h} 57^{m} 43.80^{s}
- Declination: −21° 06′ 24.0″
- Apparent magnitude (V): +3.51

Characteristics
- Spectral type: G8/K0 II/III
- U−B color index: +1.13
- B−V color index: +1.18

Astrometry
Radial velocity (R_{v})	−20.10 km/s
Proper motion (μ)	RA: 33.52 mas/yr Dec.: -13.552 mas/yr
Parallax (π)	8.4092±0.1972 mas
Distance	388 ± 9 ly (119 ± 3 pc)
Absolute magnitude (M_{V})	−1.72

Details
Mass	3.627±0.143 M_{☉}
Radius	26.747±1.97 R_{☉}
Luminosity	676 L_{☉}
Surface gravity (log g)	2.39±0.19 cgs
Temperature	4,682±75 K
Metallicity [Fe/H]	0±0.5 dex
Age	253±33 Myr

Other designations
- Jian, ξ^{2} Sgr, 37 Sgr, BD−21°5201, FK5 710, HD 175775, HIP 93085, HR 7150, SAO 187504

Database references
SIMBAD	data

Xi^{2} Sagittarii, also named Jian /dʒiæn/, is a star in the zodiac constellation of Sagittarius. Data collected during the Hipparcos mission suggests it is an astrometric binary, although nothing is known about the companion. It is visible to the naked eye with a combined apparent visual magnitude of +3.51. Based upon an annual parallax shift of 8.4 mas as seen from Earth, this system is located around 390 light years from the Sun.

The spectrum of Xi^{2} Sagittarii yields a mixed stellar classification of G8/K0 II/III, showing traits of a G- or K-type giant or bright giant star. It has an estimated 3.6 times the mass of the Sun and about 27 times the Sun's radius. At an age of around 380 million years, it is radiating 676 times the Sun's luminosity from its photosphere at an effective temperature of 4,541 K.

== Nomenclature ==
Xi^{2} Sagittarii, Latinized from ξ^{2} Sagittarii, is the star's Bayer designation.

In Chinese astronomy, 建 (Jiàn), meaning Establishment, refers to an asterism consisting of ξ^{2} Sagittarii, ο Sagittarii, π Sagittarii, 43 Sagittarii, ρ^{1} Sagittarii, and υ Sagittarii. Consequently, ξ^{2} Sagittarii itself is known as 建一 (Jiàn yī, English: the First Star of Establishment.) The IAU Working Group on Star Names adopted the name Jian for this star on 13 August 2026, after this Chinese constellation.
