= Alpha Sagittarii =

Star in the constellation of Sagittarius

- Location of α Sagittarii (circled)

Observation data Epoch J2000 Equinox ICRS
- Constellation: Sagittarius
- Right ascension: 19^{h} 23^{m} 53.17483^{s}
- Declination: −40° 36′ 57.3705″
- Apparent magnitude (V): +3.97

Characteristics
- Evolutionary stage: main sequence
- Spectral type: B8 V
- U−B color index: −0.33
- B−V color index: −0.10

Astrometry
Radial velocity (R_{v})	−0.7 km/s
Proper motion (μ)	RA: +30.49 mas/yr Dec.: −119.21 mas/yr
Parallax (π)	17.94±0.22 mas
Distance	182 ± 2 ly (55.7 ± 0.7 pc)
Absolute magnitude (M_{V})	+0.23

Details
Mass	2.95 M_{☉}
Radius	2.69 (Note: Radius retrieved multiplying angular diameter to distance; 107.5*0.00048 arcseconds*52.1 pc = 2.69 R_{☉}.) R_{☉}
Luminosity	130 L_{☉}
Surface gravity (log g)	4.11 cgs
Temperature	12,387±421 K
Metallicity [Fe/H]	−0.02 dex
Rotational velocity (v sin i)	71 km/s
Age	33 Myr

Other designations
- Rukbat, α Sgr, CD−40°13245, FK5 728, GC 26737, HD 181869, HIP 95347, HR 7348, SAO 325060, PPM 353699

Database references
SIMBAD	data

Alpha Sagittarii (α Sagittarii, abbreviated Alpha Sgr, α Sgr), also named Rukbat (/ˈrʌkbæt/), is a star in the constellation of Sagittarius.

== Properties ==
Alpha Sagittarii is a blue, class B dwarf star. It does not appear particularly bright in the sky to the naked eye, with a visual apparent magnitude of +3.97.

The star has an effective temperature about twice that of the Sun and is nearly three times as massive, with a luminosity about 130 times that of the Sun. Based on an excess emission of infrared radiation, it may have a debris disk, much like Vega. It is a single-lined spectroscopic binary system. The ROSAT All Sky Survey discovered that Alpha Sagittarii is emitting an excess flux of X-rays, which is not expected to originate from a star of this spectral class. The most likely explanation is that the companion is an active pre-main sequence star or else a star that has just reached the main sequence.

== Nomenclature ==
α Sagittarii (Latinised to Alpha Sagittarii) is the star's Bayer designation. It is unclear why Bayer designated this star as the alpha in his Uranometria star atlas (placing it in the second magnitude class), rather than Kaus Australis or Nunki, which are at least five times brighter than α Sgr. This led some old star charts to occasionally depict Alpha and Beta Sagittarii as much brighter than they are in reality, as they are invisible from northern Europe, being too far south to see there.

The star bore the traditional names Rukbat and Alrami, derived from the Arabic rukbat al-rāmī 'the knee of the archer'. The star Delta Cassiopeiae also bore the traditional names Ruchbah or Rukbat, from the Arabic word ركبة rukbah meaning "knee". In 2016, the International Astronomical Union organized a Working Group on Star Names (WGSN) to catalog and standardize proper names for stars. The WGSN's first bulletin of July 2016 included a table of the first two batches of names approved by the WGSN; which included Rukbat for this star (Delta Cassiopeiae was later given the name Ruchbah).

In Chinese, 天淵 (Tiān Yuān), meaning Celestial Spring, refers to an asterism consisting of Alpha Sagittarii, Beta¹ Sagittarii and Beta² Sagittarii. Consequently, the Chinese name for Alpha Sagittarii itself is 天淵三 (Tiān Yuān sān, English: the Third Star of Celestial Spring.)

This star, together with Beta¹ Sagittarii and Beta² Sagittarii, were Al Ṣuradain (ألسردين), the two Surad, desert birds.

== In popular culture ==
A fictionalized version of the Rukbat system is the setting for Anne McCaffrey's Dragonriders of Pern series of novels. In the canon of this series, Rukbat is a "golden G-type star" and the system has five planets in standard orbits, two asteroid belts, an Oort cloud, and has also captured a rogue planet into a highly eccentric orbit which passes both through the Oort cloud and through the inner solar system on a 250 year orbit.
