= Red Spider Nebula =

Planetary nebula in the Milky Way

Emission nebula
- Planetary nebula
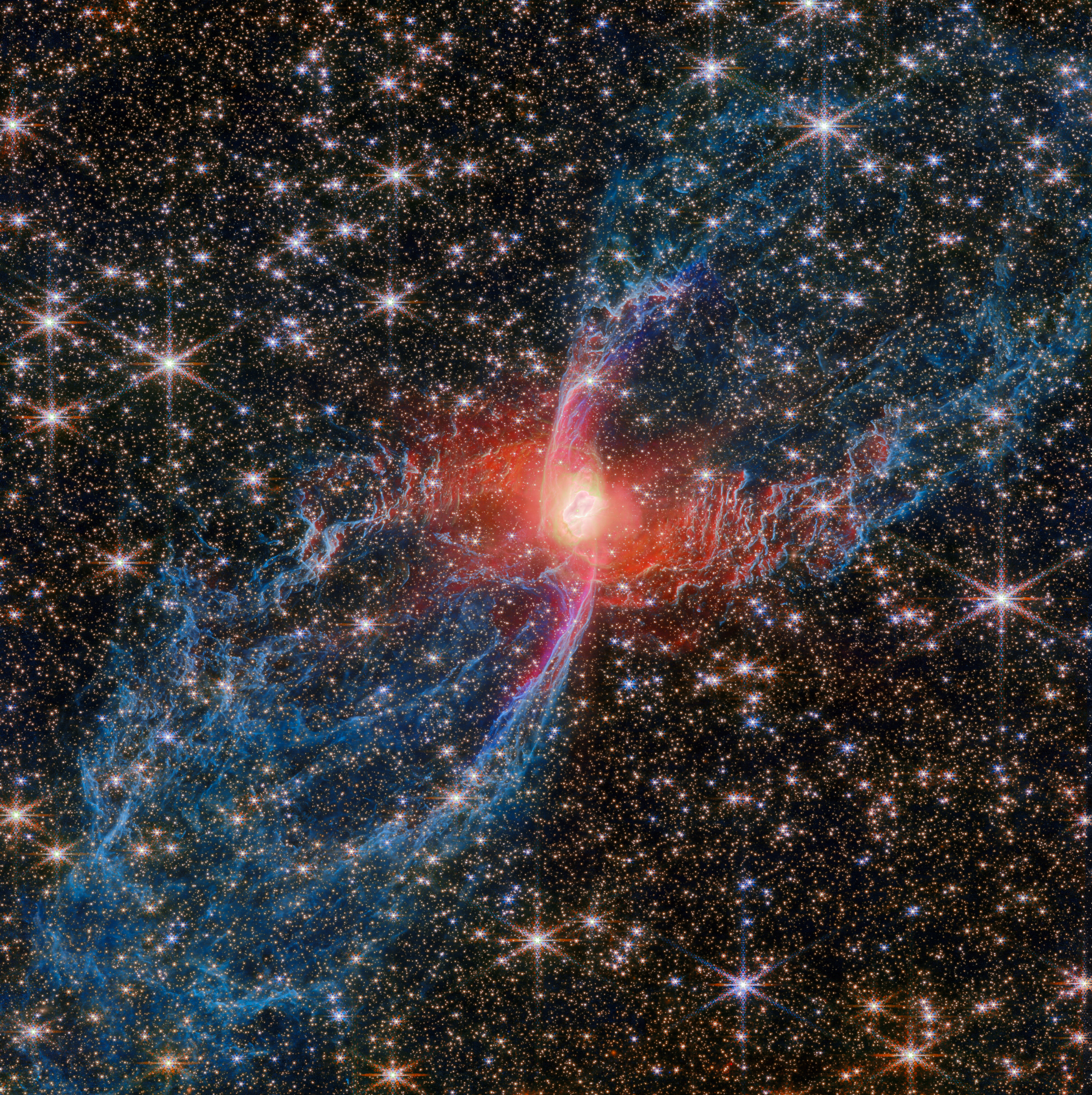
- The Red Spider Nebula imaged by the James Webb Space Telescope

Observation data: J2000 epoch
- Right ascension: 18^{h} 05^{m} 13.0977^{s}
- Declination: −19° 50′ 34.713″
- Distance: ~5000 ly
- Apparent magnitude (V): 13
- Apparent dimensions (V): 0.6′ × 0.3′
- Constellation: Sagittarius

Physical characteristics
- Radius: 1.1 pc
- Absolute magnitude (V): -
- Notable features: hot white dwarf
- Designations: ESO 590-PN 001, 2MASS J18051309-1950347, NGC 6537

The Red Spider Nebula (also catalogued as NGC 6537) is a planetary nebula located in the northwest of the constellation Sagittarius. It was discovered by Edward Charles Pickering on 15 July 1882.

The nebula has a prominent two-lobed shape, possibly due to a binary companion or magnetic fields and has an S-shaped symmetry of the lobes – the lobes opposite each other appear similar. This is believed to be due to the presence of a companion to the central white dwarf. However, the gas walls of the two lobed structures are not at all smooth, but rather are rippled in a complex way.

The central white dwarf, the remaining compact core of the original star, produces a powerful and hot (≈10,000 K) wind blowing with a speed of 300 kilometers per second, which has generated waves 100 billion kilometres high. The waves are generated by supersonic shocks formed when the local gas is compressed and heated in front of the rapidly expanding lobes. Atoms caught in the shocks radiate a visible light. These winds are what give this nebula its unique 'spider' shape and also contribute to the expansion of the nebula.

The star at the center of the Red Spider Nebula is surrounded by a dust shell making its exact properties hard to determine. Its surface temperature is probably 150,000–250,000 K, although a temperature of 340,000 K or even 500,000 K is not ruled out, making it among the hottest white dwarf stars known. Observations with Hubble and JWST NIRCam showed hot (around 1000 K) circumstellar dust around the central star. The researchers propose that interactions between the progenitor star and a close companion are responsible for many features of NGC 6537. The central binary may be surrounded by a circumbinary disk. Non-detection in X-rays suggests that the companion is less massive than the Sun.

The Red Spider Nebula lies near the constellation of Sagittarius. Its distance has been variously estimated as 1,900 light-years or, more likely, 3,000–8,000 light-years.

A research team studied the nebula with Hubble, ALMA, Chandra and JWST. The core of the nebula is shown to be consistent with a highly asymmetric ring or irregular spiral with a radius of 5 arcseconds (0.04 parsec). The core is surrounded by an equatorial molecular torus with a deprojected radius of around 0.13 parsec and an inclination of 38°. The torus has an outflow velocity of 13 km/s and an age of around 10,000 years. Molecular hydrogen imaging showed the full extent of the polar lobes, showing that they are closed bubble-like structure with an extent of around 100 arcseconds (deprojected around 0.9 parsec). The lobes have an outflow velocity of around 300 km/s and a dynamical age of around 3700 years. The lobes have an S-shape in iron [Fe II] imaging, which is also seen in NGC 6302. This likely traces fast shocks from a collision between an active, collimated stellar wind with slower-moving material forming the polar lobe rims.

== Gallery ==
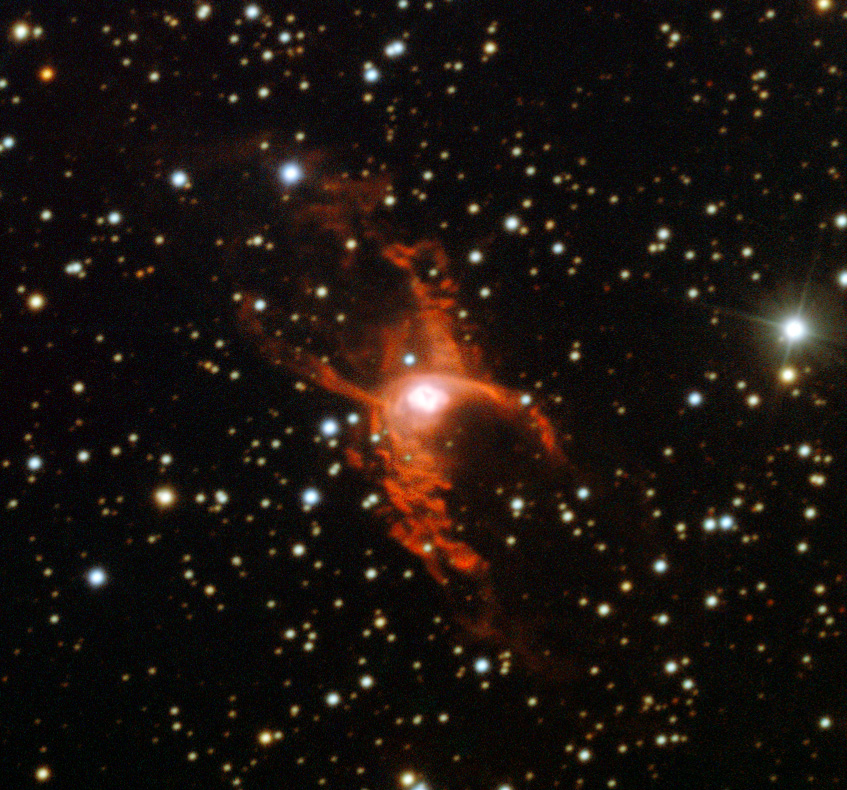
Bipolar planetary nebula NGC 6537 taken with the New Technology Telescope at La Silla Observatory.

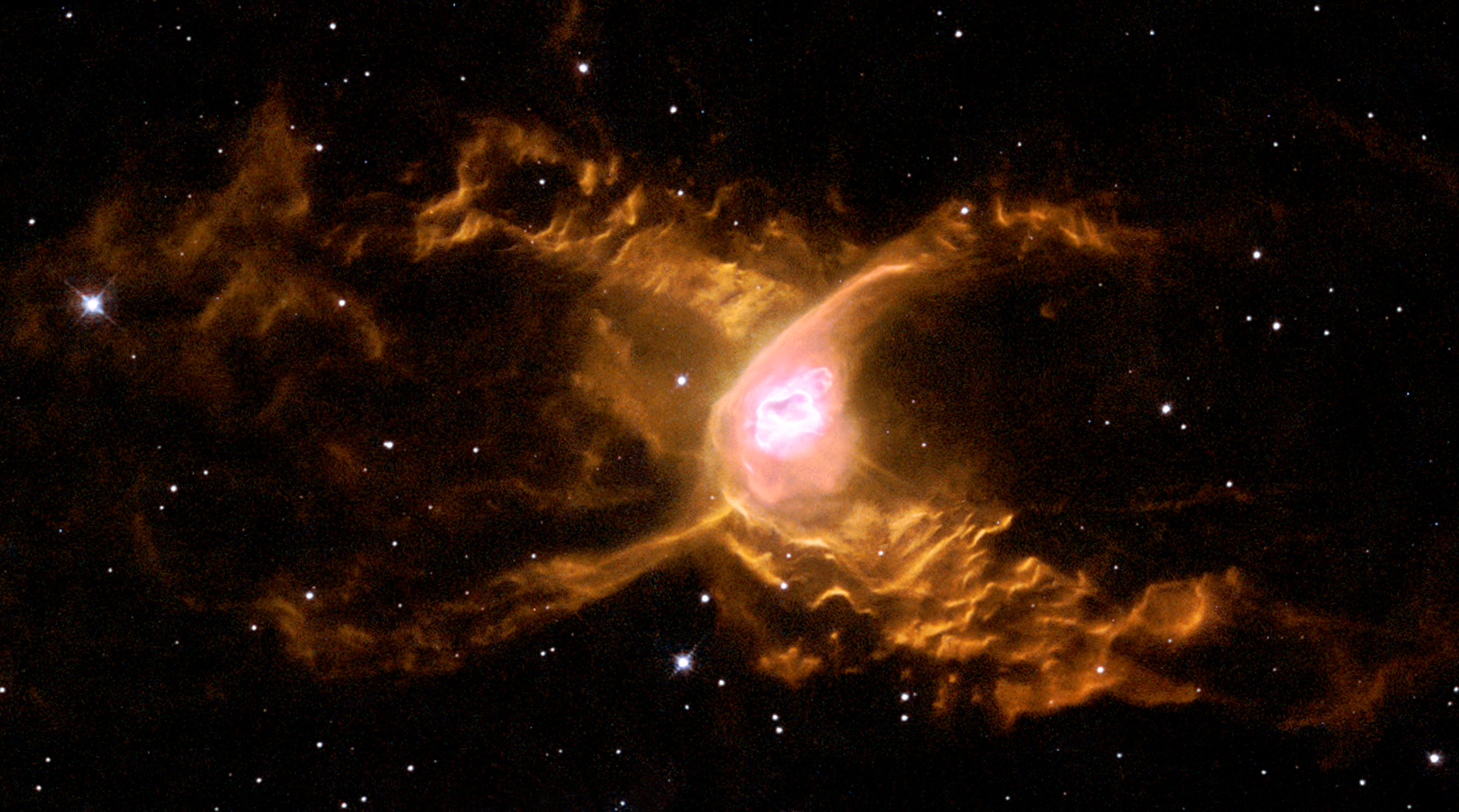
The Red Spider Nebula imaged by the Hubble Space Telescope

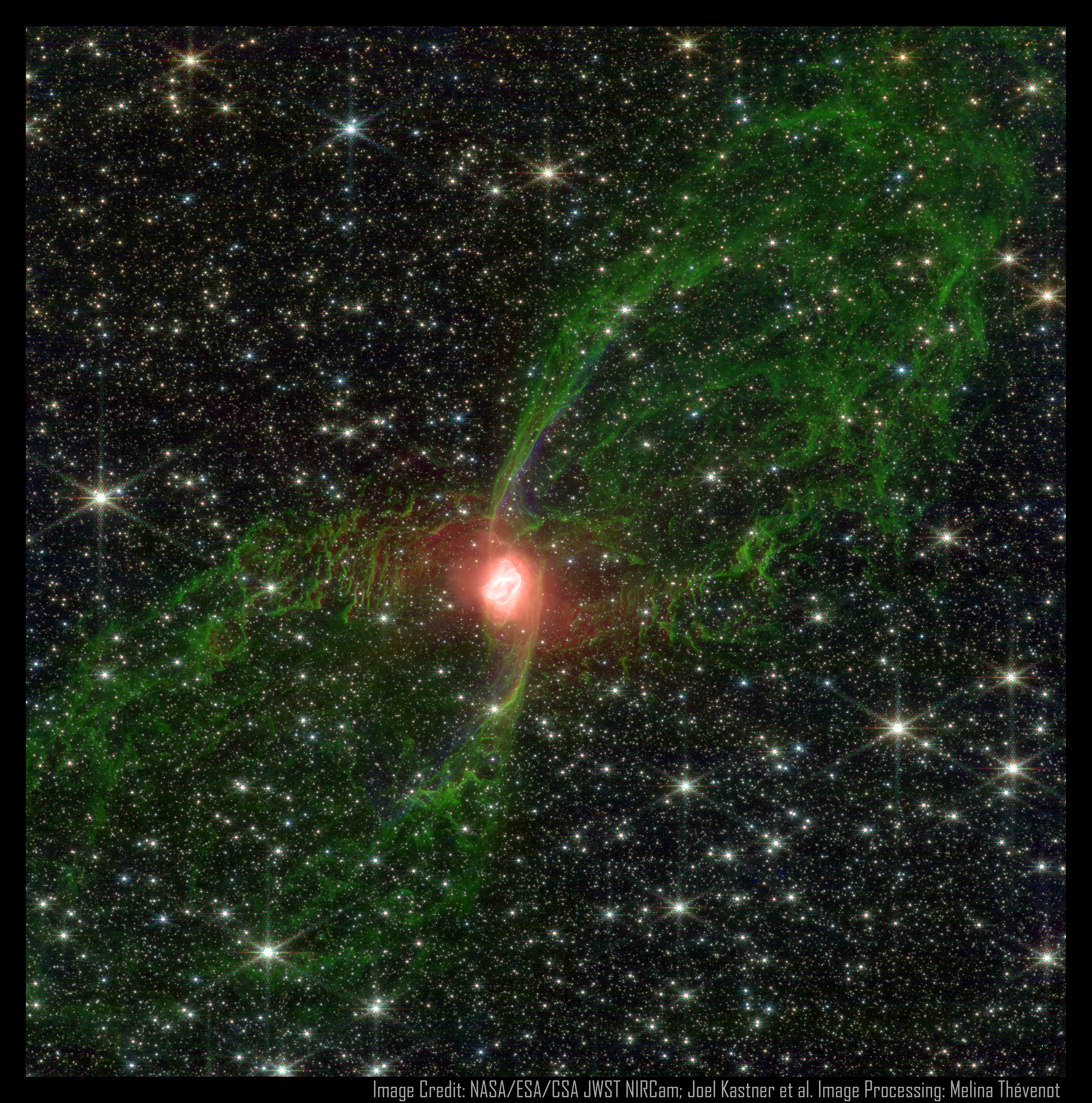
The Red Spider Nebula with JWST NIRCam. Iron is blue, molecular hydrogen is green and Br-alpha is red.

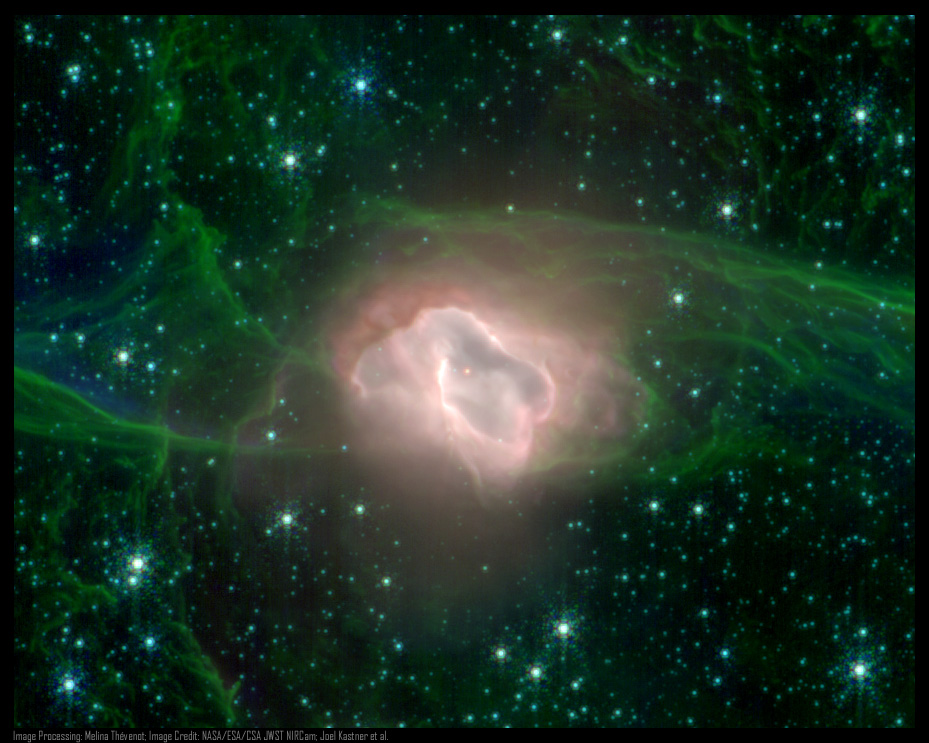
Central region of NGC 6537, revealing the central star as a red point inside the core.

== See also ==
- List of NGC objects (6001–7000)
