= Sagittarius (constellation) =

Zodiac constellation in the southern celestial hemisphere

- Constellation
- List of stars in Sagittarius
- Abbreviation: Sgr
- Genitive: Sagittarii
- Pronunciation: /ˌsædʒɪˈtɛəriəs/, genitive /-iaɪ/
- Symbolism: the Archer
- Right ascension: 19^{h}
- Declination: −25°
- Quadrant: SQ4
- Area: 867 sq. deg. (15th)
- Main stars: 12, 8
- Bayer/Flamsteed stars: 68
- Stars brighter than 3.00^{m}: 7
- Stars within 10.00 pc (32.62 ly): 3
- Brightest star: ε Sgr (Kaus Australis) (1.79^{m})
- Nearest star: Ross 154
- Messier objects: 15
- Bordering constellations: Aquila; Scutum; Serpens Cauda; Ophiuchus; Scorpius; Corona Australis; Telescopium; Indus (corner); Microscopium; Capricornus
- Visible at latitudes between +45° and −90°. Best visible at 21:00 (9 p.m.) during the month of August.

Sagittarius is one of the constellations of the zodiac and is located in the Southern celestial hemisphere. It is one of the 48 constellations listed by the 2nd-century astronomer Ptolemy and remains one of the 88 modern constellations. Its old astrological symbol is (♐︎). Its name is Latin for "archer". Sagittarius is commonly represented as a centaur drawing a bow. It lies between Scorpius and Ophiuchus to the west and Capricornus and Microscopium to the east.

The center of the Milky Way lies in the westernmost part of Sagittarius (see Sagittarius A).

== Visualizations ==
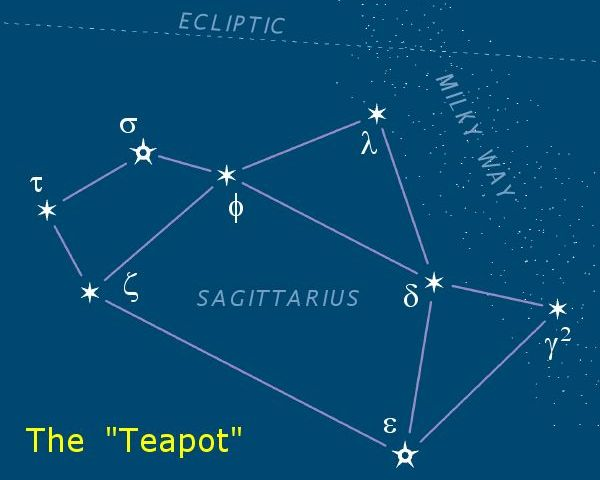
The "Teapot" asterism is in Sagittarius. The Milky Way is the "steam" coming from the spout. The galactic center Sagittarius A* is located off the top of the spout.

As seen from the northern hemisphere, the constellation's brighter stars form an easily recognizable asterism known as "the Teapot". The stars δ Sgr (Kaus Media), ε Sgr (Kaus Australis), ζ Sgr (Ascella), and φ Sgr (Nandou) form the body of the pot; λ Sgr (Kaus Borealis) is the point of the lid; γ^{2} Sgr (Alnasl) is the tip of the spout; and σ Sgr (Nunki) and τ Sgr the handle. These same stars originally formed the bow and arrow of Sagittarius.

Marking the bottom of the teapot's "handle" (or the shoulder area of the archer), is the bright star (2.59 magnitude) Zeta Sagittarii (ζ Sgr), named Ascella, and the fainter Tau Sagittarii (τ Sgr).

To complete the teapot metaphor, under dark skies a particularly dense area of the Milky Way (the Large Sagittarius Star Cloud) can be seen rising in a north-westerly arc above the spout, like a puff of steam rising from a boiling kettle.

The constellation as a whole is often depicted as having the rough appearance of a stick-figure archer drawing its bow, with the fainter stars providing the outline of the horse's body. Sagittarius famously points its arrow at the heart of Scorpius, represented by the reddish star Antares, as the two constellations race around the sky. Following the direct line formed by Delta Sagittarii (δ Sgr) and Gamma2 Sagittarii (γ^{2} Sgr) leads nearly directly to Antares. Fittingly, Gamma2 Sagittarii is Alnasl, the Arabic word for "arrowhead", and Delta Sagittarii is called Kaus Media, the "center of the bow," from which the arrow protrudes. Kaus Media bisects Lambda Sagittarii (λ Sgr) and Epsilon Sagittarii (ε Sgr), whose names Kaus Borealis and Kaus Australis refer to the northern and southern portions of the bow, respectively.

Due to its astronomical interest and its status as a Zodiac constellation, Sagittarius is one of the best-known constellations and is considered a prominent feature of the summer skies in the northern hemisphere. However, at locations north of 43°N the constellation either drags along the southern horizon, or it does not rise at all. By contrast, in most of the southern hemisphere Sagittarius can appear overhead or nearly so. It is hidden behind the Sun's glare from mid-November to mid-January and is the location of the Sun at the December solstice. By March, Sagittarius is rising at midnight. In June, it achieves opposition and can be seen all night. The June full moon appears in Sagittarius.

In classical antiquity, Capricorn was the location of the Sun at the December solstice, but due to the precession of the equinoxes, this had shifted to Sagittarius by the time of the Roman Empire. By approximately 2700 AD, the Sun will be in Scorpius at the December solstice.

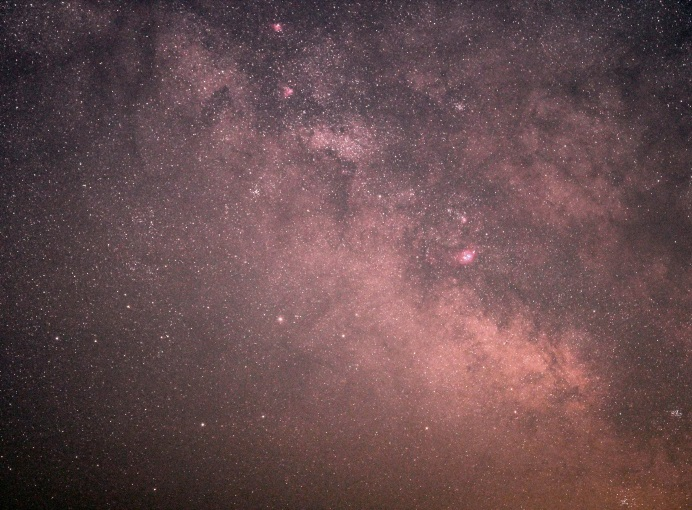
Sagittarius region of the Milky Way

== Features ==
=== Stars ===
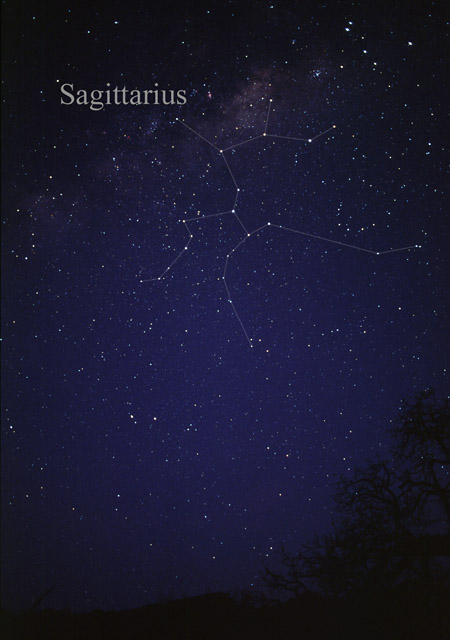
The constellation Sagittarius. North is to the left. The line going to the right connects ζ to α and β Sagittarii. Above this line one sees Corona Australis.

α Sgr (Rukbat, meaning "the archer's knee") despite having the "alpha" designation, is not the brightest star of the constellation, having a magnitude of only 3.96. It is towards the bottom center of the map as shown. Instead, the brightest star is Epsilon Sagittarii (ε Sgr) (Kaus Australis, or "southern part of the bow"), at magnitude 1.85, or about seven times as bright as α Sgr.

Sigma Sagittarii (σ Sgr) (Nunki) is the constellation's second-brightest star at magnitude 2.08. Nunki is a B2V star approximately 260 light-years away. "Nunki" is a Babylonian name of uncertain origin, but thought to represent the sacred Babylonian city of Eridu on the Euphrates, which would make Nunki the oldest star name currently in use.

Zeta Sagittarii (ζ Sgr) (Ascella), with apparent magnitude 2.61 of A2 spectra, is actually a double star whose two components have magnitudes 3.3 and 3.5.

Delta Sagittarii (δ Sgr) (Kaus Media), is a K2 spectra star with magnitude 2.71 about 350 light years from Earth.

Eta Sagittarii (η Sgr) is a double star with component magnitudes of 3.18 and 10, while Pi Sagittarii (π Sgr) (Albaldah) is actually a triple system whose components have magnitudes 3.7, 3.8, and 6.0.

The Bayer designation Beta Sagittarii (Beta Sgr, β Sagittarii, β Sgr) is shared by two star systems, β¹ Sagittarii, with apparent magnitude 3.96, and β² Sagittarii, magnitude 7.4. The two stars are separated by 0.36° in the sky and are 378 light-years from earth. Beta Sagittarii, located at a position associated with the forelegs of the centaur, has the traditional name Arkab, meaning "Achilles tendon".

Nova Sagittarii 2015 No. 2 was discovered on 15 March 2015, by John Seach of Chatsworth Island, NSW, Australia. It lies near the center of the constellation. It reached a peak magnitude of 4.3 before steadily fading.

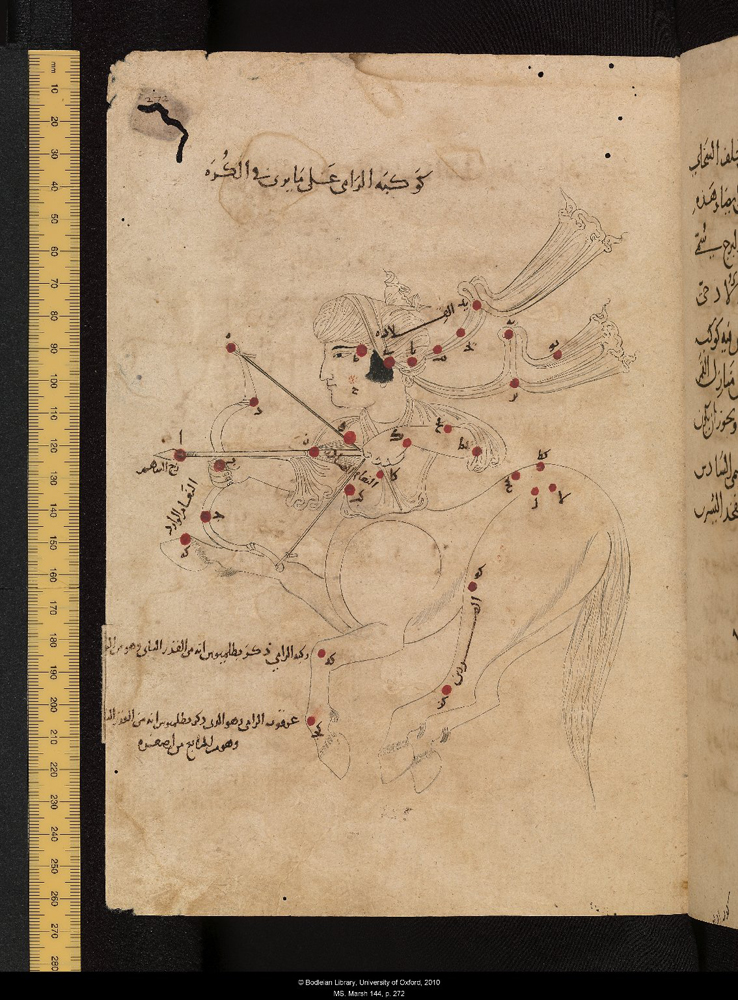
Sagittarius from Al-Sufi's Book of Fixed Stars, dated 1009-10

=== Named stars ===
Name	Bayer designation	Origin	Meaning	Light Years
Rukbat	α	Arabic	the Knee of the Archer	182
Arkab Prior	β^{1}	Arab-Latin	the former Achilles Tendon of the archer	310
Arkab Posterior	β^{2}	Arab-Latin	the Archer's Achilles Tendon	134
Dhanusaragra	γ^{1}	Sanskrit	The Arrow	1,400
Alnasl	γ^{2}	Arabic	the Point of the Arrow	106
Kaus Media	δ	Arab-Latin	the Middle of the Bow	348
Kaus Australis	ε	Arab-Latin	The Southern Bow	143
Ascella	ζ	Late Latin	Armpit	88
Heryibwia	η	Egyptian	[the star in] The Middle of the Boat	146
Kaus Borealis	λ	Arab-Latin	the Northern part of the Bow	78.2
Polis	μ	Coptic	City	5,000
Ainalrami	ν^{1}	Arabic	Eye of the Archer	1,100
Pabilsang	ν^{2}	Sumerian	Pabilsaĝ	270
Jian	ξ^{2}	Chinese	Establishment	390
Alqiladah	ο	Arabic	the Necklace	142
Albaldah	π	Arabic	the Town	510
Kenemu	ρ^{1}	Egyptian	Crew of the Boat [Wia]	127
Nunki	σ	Sumerian	Star of Eridu	225
Nandou	φ	Chinese	Southern Dipper	239
Terebellum	ω	Ancient Greek	Quadrilateral	76

=== Deep-sky objects ===
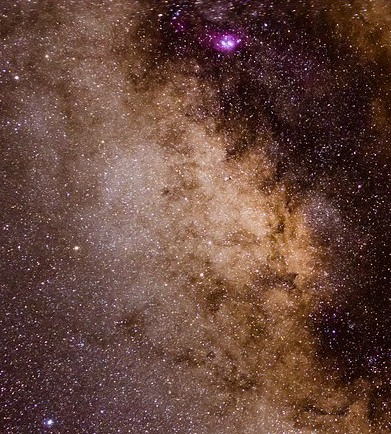
Large Sagittarius Star Cloud with Lagoon Nebula at top

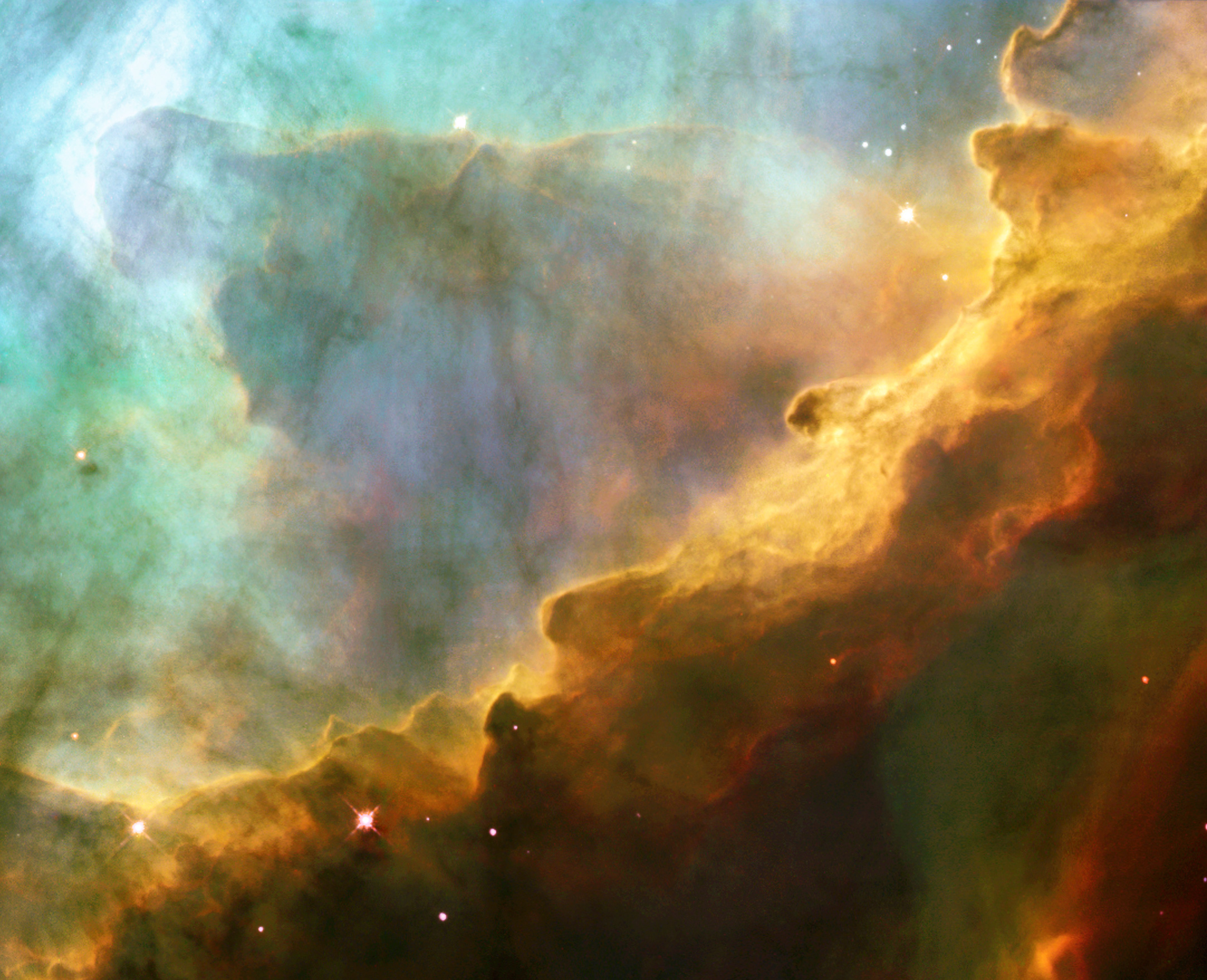
The Omega Nebula, also known as the Horseshoe or Swan Nebula

The Milky Way is visibly densest and brightest in this region, as the Galactic Center lies in Sagittarius. As a result, the Sagittarius region contains many star clusters and nebulae.

==== Star clouds ====
Sagittarius contains two well-known star clouds, both considered fine binocular objects.

- The Large Sagittarius Star Cloud is the brightest visible region of the Milky Way. It is a portion of the central bulge of the galaxy seen around the thick dust of the Great Rift, and is the innermost galactic structure that can be observed in visible wavelengths. It has several embedded clusters and superimposed dark nebulae.
- The Small Sagittarius Star Cloud, also known as Messier 24, has an apparent magnitude of 2.5. The cloud fills a space of significant volume to a depth of 10,000 to 16,000 light-years. Embedded in M24 is NGC 6603, a small star cluster that is very dense. NGC 6567, a dim planetary nebula, and Barnard 92, a Bok globule, are also nearby.

==== Nebulae ====
Sagittarius contains several well-known nebulae, including the Lagoon Nebula (Messier 8), near λ Sagittarii; the Omega Nebula (Messier 17), near the border with Scutum; and the Trifid Nebula (Messier 20), a large nebula containing some very young, hot stars.

- The Lagoon Nebula (M8) is an emission nebula that is located 5,000 light-years from Earth and measures 140 light-years by 60 light-years (1.5°). Though it appears grey in telescopes to the unaided eye, long-exposure photographs reveal its pink hue, common to emission nebulae. It is fairly bright, with an integrated magnitude of 3.0. The Lagoon Nebula was discovered independently by John Flamsteed in 1680, Guillaume Le Gentil in 1747, and Charles Messier in 1764. The central area of the Lagoon Nebula is also known as the Hourglass Nebula, so named for its distinctive shape. The Hourglass Nebula has its shape because of matter propelled by Herschel 36. The Lagoon Nebula also features three dark nebulae listed in the Barnard Catalogue. The Lagoon Nebula was instrumental in the discovery of Bok globules, as Bart Bok studied prints of the nebula intensively in 1947. Approximately 17,000 Bok globules were discovered in the nebula nine years later as a part of the Palomar Sky Survey; studies later showed that Bok's hypothesis that the globules held protostars was correct.
- The Omega Nebula is a fairly bright nebula, sometimes called the Horseshoe Nebula or Swan Nebula. It has an integrated magnitude of 6.0 and is 4890 light-years from Earth. It was discovered in 1746 by Philippe Loys de Chésaux; observers since him have differed greatly in how they view the nebula, hence its myriad of names. Most often viewed as a checkmark, it was seen as a swan by George F. Chambers in 1889, a loon by Roy Bishop, and as a curl of smoke by Camille Flammarion.
- The Trifid Nebula (M20, NGC 6514) is an emission nebula in Sagittarius that lies less than two degrees from the Lagoon Nebula. Discovered by French comet-hunter Charles Messier, it is located between 2,000 and 9,000 light-years from Earth and has a diameter of approximately 50 light-years. The outside of the Trifid Nebula is a bluish reflection nebula; the interior is pink with two dark bands that divide it into three areas, sometimes called "lobes". Hydrogen in the nebula is ionized, creating its characteristic color, by a central triple star, which formed in the intersection of the two dark bands. M20 is associated with a cluster that has a magnitude of 6.3.
- The Red Spider Nebula (NGC 6537) is a planetary nebula located at a distance of about 4000 light-years from Earth.
- NGC 6559 is a star-forming region located at a distance of about 5000 light-years from Earth, in the constellation of Sagittarius, showing both emission (red) and reflection (blue) regions.

In addition, several other nebulae have been located within Sagittarius and are of interest to astronomy.

- NGC 6445 is a planetary nebula with an approximate magnitude of 11. A large nebula at over one arcminute in diameter, it appears very close to the globular cluster NGC 6440.
- NGC 6638 is a dimmer globular at magnitude 9.2, though it is more distant than M71 at a distance of 26,000 light-years. It is a Shapley class VI cluster; the classification means that it has an intermediate concentration at its core. It is approximately a degree away from the brighter globulars M22 and M28; NGC 6638 is southeast and southwest of the clusters respectively.

==== Other deep sky objects ====
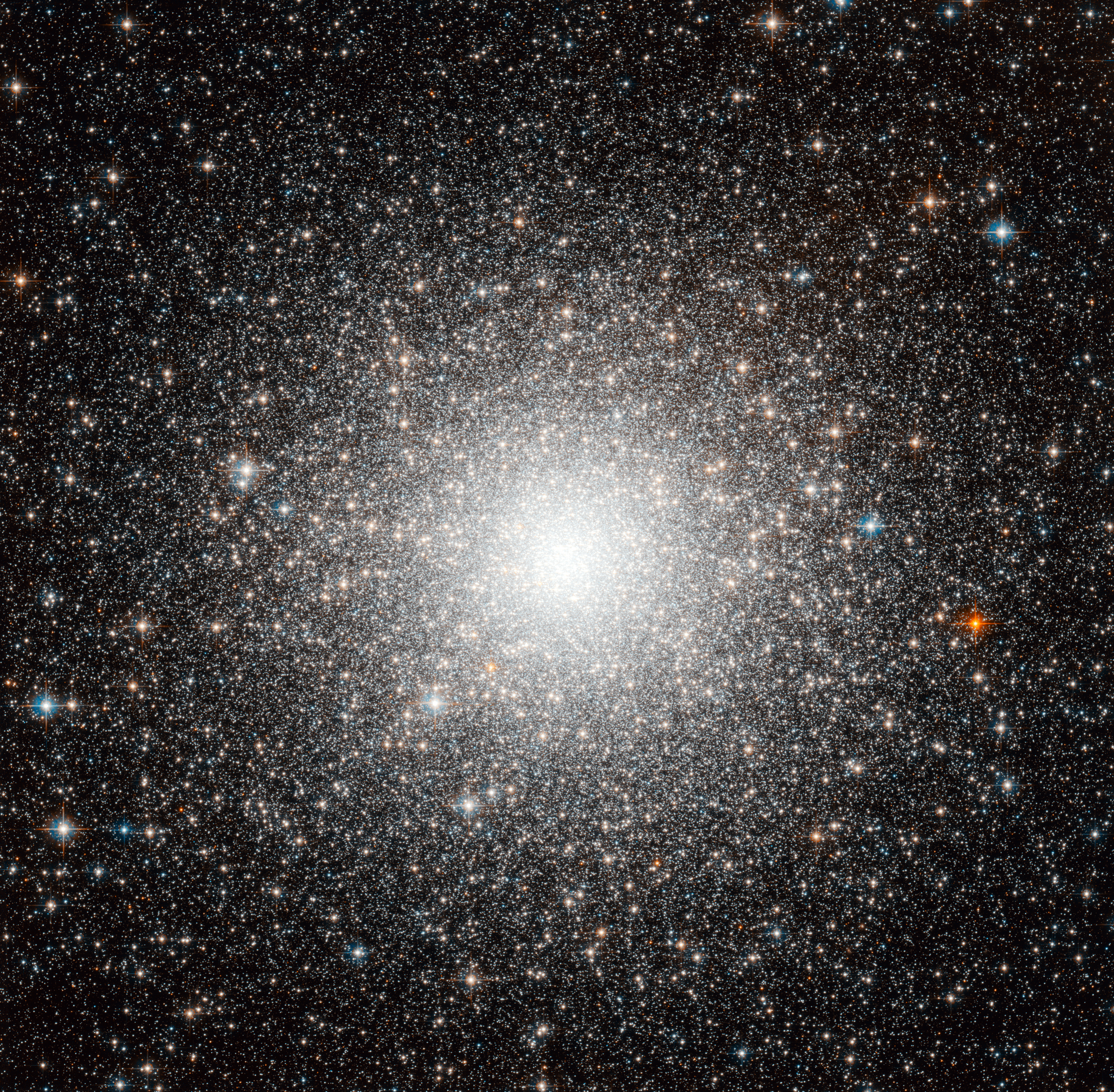
Messier 54 was the first globular cluster found that is outside the Milky Way.

In 1999 a violent outburst at V4641 Sgr was thought to have revealed the location of the closest known black hole to Earth, but later investigation increased its estimated distance by a factor of 15. The complex radio source Sagittarius A is also located in Sagittarius, near its western boundary with Ophiuchus. Astronomers believe that one of its components, known as Sagittarius A*, is associated with a supermassive black hole at the center of the galaxy, with a mass of 2.6 million solar masses. Although not visible to the naked eye, Sagittarius A* is located off the top of the spout of the Teapot asterism. The Sagittarius Dwarf Elliptical Galaxy is located just outside the Milky Way.

Baade's Window is an area with very little obscuring dust that shows objects closer to the Milky Way's center than would normally be visible. NGC 6522, magnitude 8.6, and NGC 6528, magnitude 9.5, are both globular clusters visible through Baade's Window. 20,000 and 24,000 light-years from Earth, with Shapley classes of VI and V respectively, both are moderately concentrated at their cores. NGC 6528 is closer to the galactic core at an approximate distance of 2,000 light-years.

2MASS-GC02, also known as Hurt 2, is a globular cluster at a distance of about 16 thousand light-years from Earth. It was discovered in 2000 by Joselino Vasquez, and confirmed by a team of astronomers under the leadership of R. J. Hurt at 2MASS.

== Asterisms ==
=== Dipper ===
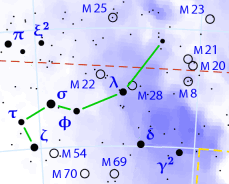
The six stars of Nandou, the Southern Dipper

Five of the stars in the Teapot asterism – Lambda, Phi, Sigma, Tau and Zeta Sagittarii – form a ladle shape, called the Milk Dipper in the West. In Chinese astronomy, these stars plus Mu Sagittarii are also called the Dipper (斗, Dou), or the Southern Dipper (南斗, Nandou) in contrast to the Northern Dipper. It is the eighth of the Twenty-Eight Mansions. The IAU Working Group on Star Names (WGSN) has adopted the name Nandou for Phi Sagittarii.

=== Al-Naʿāʾim ===
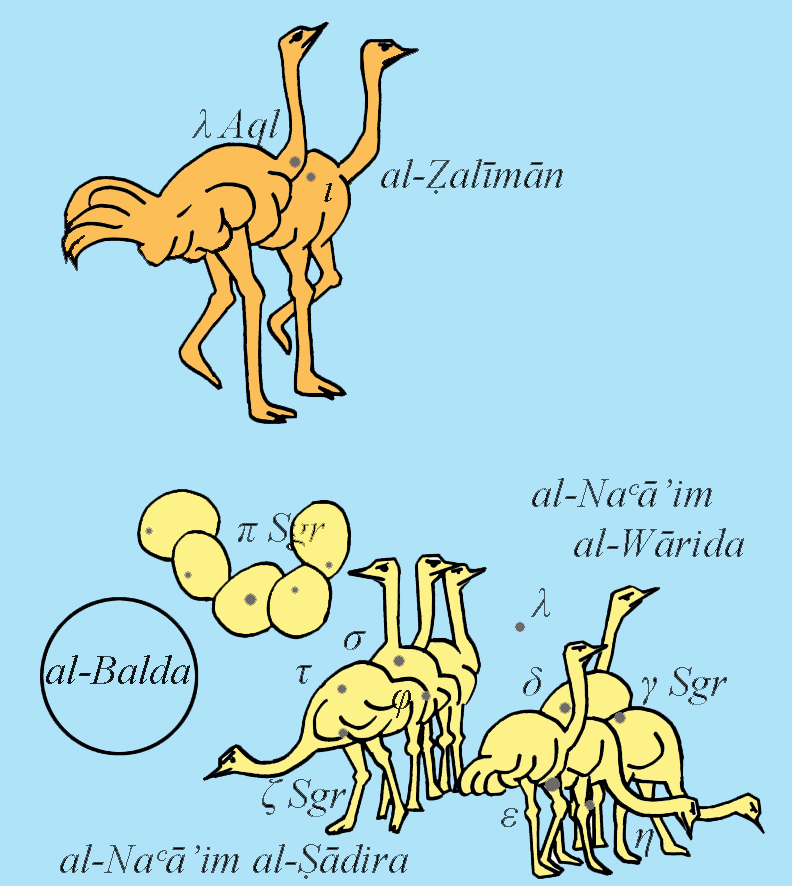
Illustration of the ostriches visualized in Sagittarius, and another pair in Iota and Lambda Aquilae

Eight stars in the region of the Teapot were traditionally known in the Arab world as al-naʿāʾim (النعائم), the Ostriches, which is the 20th lunar station (manzil). These stars are divided into two groups of four: Gamma, Delta, Epsilon and Eta Sagittarii are al-naʿām al-wārid (النعام الوارد) or wārida, the Drinking Ostriches, while Phi, Sigma, Tau and Zeta Sagittarii are al-naʿām al-ṣādir (النعام الصادر) or ṣādira, the Returning Ostriches. One group of ostriches was thought of as going down to the river (the Milky Way) to drink, and the other was thought of as coming back up.

The region between the two groups of ostriches (in the middle of the Teapot) was known as al-waṣl (الوصل), the Junction; the WGSN has assigned the name Alwasl to the faint star HD 171034 in this region.

A nearby semi-circle of six stars – Xi, Omicron, Pi, 43, Rho and Upsilon Sagittarii – were al-udḥī (االدحي), the Ostrich Nest, also known as al-qilāda (القالدة), the Necklace and al-qaws (القوس), the Bow. An empty region nearby, devoid of stars, was the 21st lunar station, al-balda (البلدة), the Wasteland (often mistranslated as the City). The names Alqiladah and Albaldah are now associated with the stars Omicron and Pi Sagittarii, respectively.

=== Terebellum ===
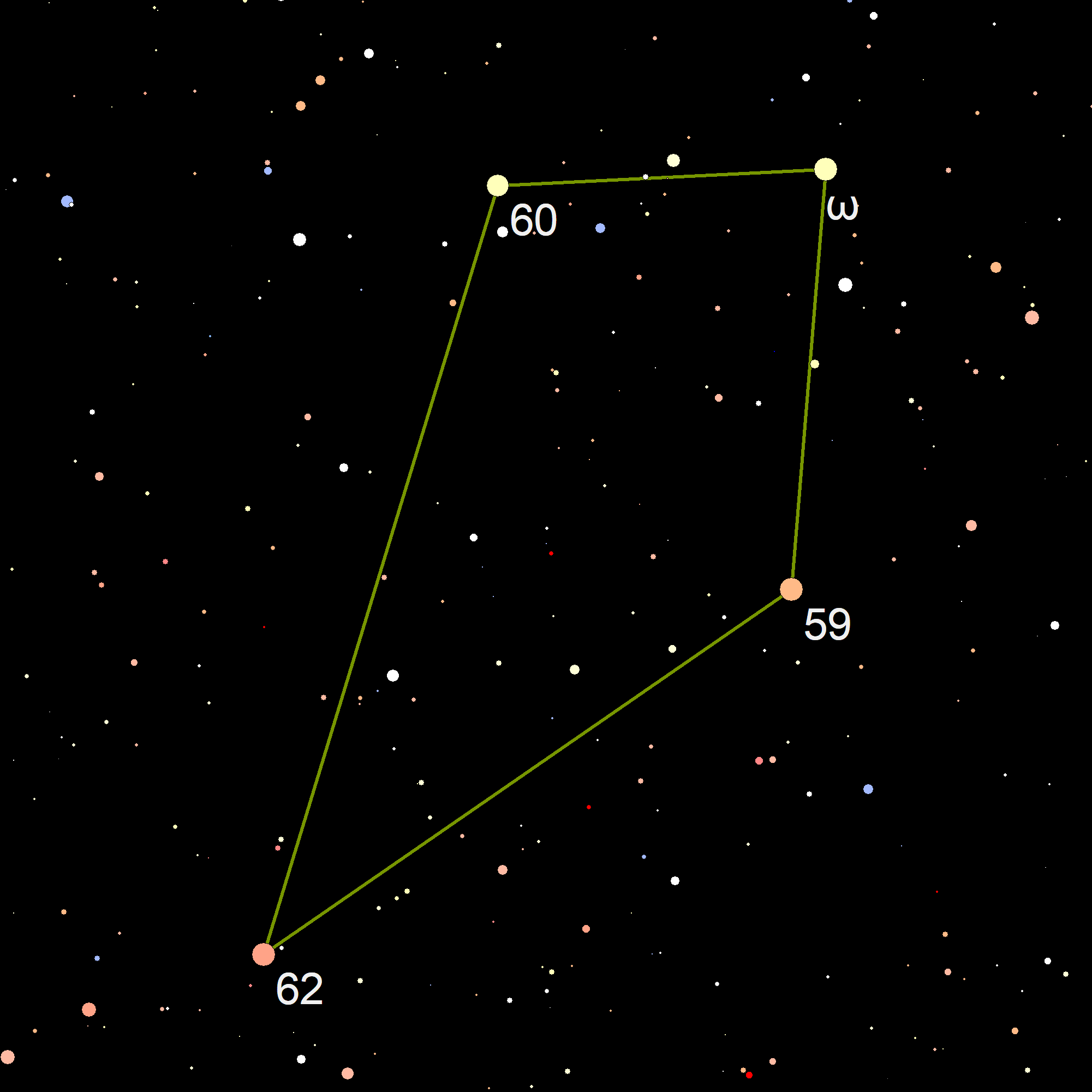
Terebellum asterism

On the east side of the constellation, Ptolemy described an asterism consisting of four 4th magnitude stars, which he called τετράπλευρον "quadrilateral". This name was Latinized to Terebellum by Johann Bayer in his 1603 Uranometria. The northernmost star, Omega Sagittarii, is now individually named Terebellum by the IAU; the other three stars are 59 Sagittarii, 60 Sagittarii, and 62 Sagittarii. In Chinese astronomy, the same group of stars is called Gouguo (狗国), meaning "land of dogs" or "dog kingdom".

A constellation called Terebellum, the Drill, was also described by the medieval author Michael Scot.

== Space exploration ==
The space probe New Horizons is moving on a trajectory out of the Solar System as of 2016 that places the probe in front of Sagittarius as seen from the Earth. New Horizons will exhaust its radioisotope thermoelectric generator long before it reaches any other stars.

The Wow! signal was a strong narrowband radio signal that appeared to have come from the direction of Sagittarius.

== Mythology ==
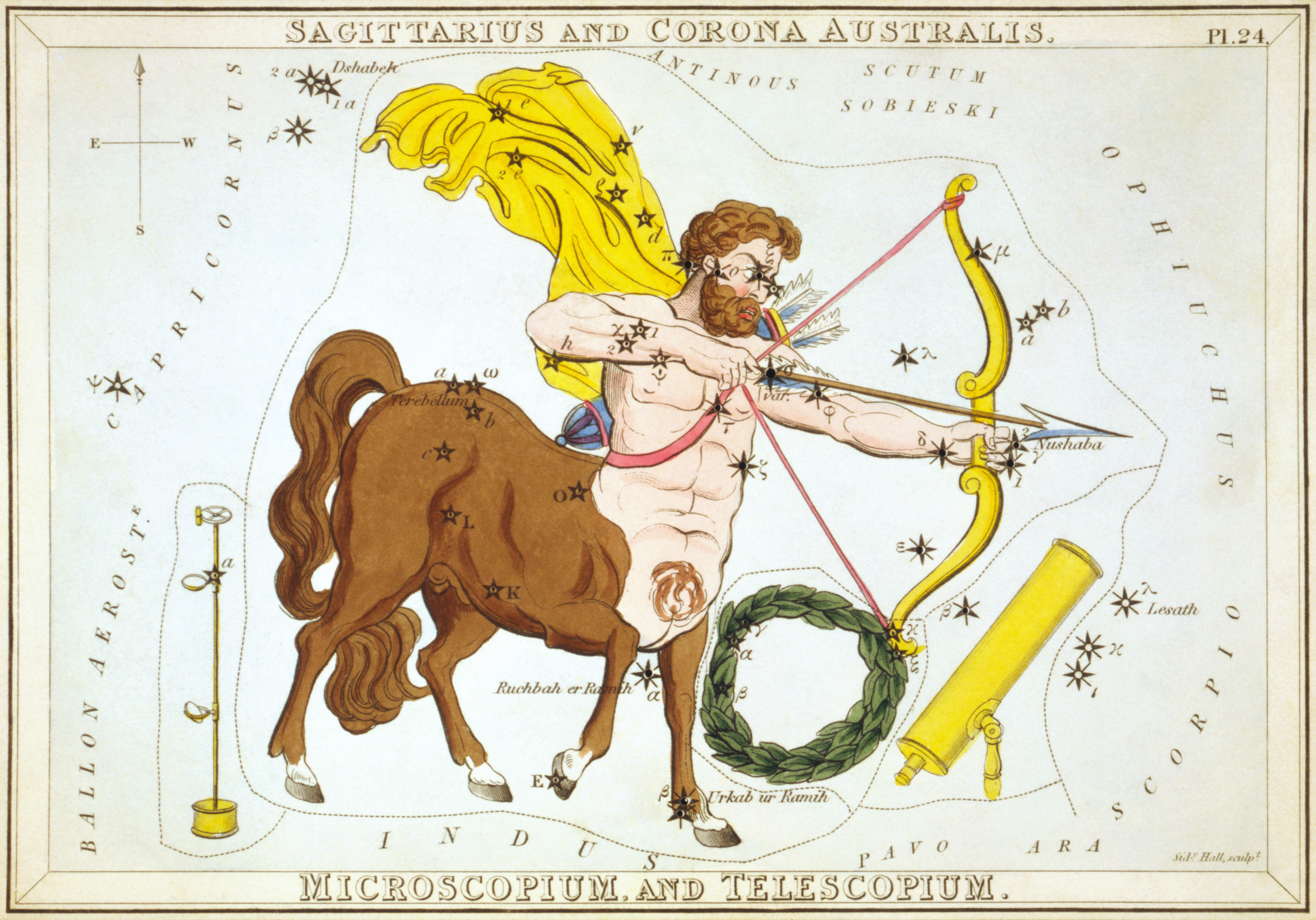
Sagittarius as depicted in Urania's Mirror, a set of constellation cards published in London c. 1825. The Terebellum is seen in the back of the centaur

The Babylonians identified Sagittarius as the god Nergal, a centaur-like creature firing an arrow from a bow. It is generally depicted with wings, with two heads, one panther head and one human head, as well as a scorpion's stinger raised above its more conventional horse's tail. The Sumerian name Pabilsag is composed of two elements – Pabil, meaning 'elder paternal kinsman' and Sag, meaning 'chief, head'. The name may thus be translated as the 'Forefather' or 'Chief Ancestor'. The figure is reminiscent of modern depictions of Sagittarius.

=== Greek mythology ===
In Greek mythology, Sagittarius is usually identified as a centaur: half human, half horse. However, perhaps due to the Greeks' adoption of the Sumerian constellation, some confusion surrounds the identity of the archer. Some identify Sagittarius as the centaur Chiron, the son of Philyra and Cronus, who was said to have changed himself into a horse to escape his jealous wife, Rhea, and tutor to Jason. As there are two centaurs in the sky, some identify Chiron with the other constellation, known as Centaurus. Or, as an alternative tradition holds, that Chiron devised the constellations Sagittarius and Centaurus to help guide the Argonauts in their quest for the Golden Fleece.

A competing mythological tradition, as espoused by Eratosthenes, identified the Archer not as a centaur but as the satyr Crotus, son of Pan, who Greeks credited with the invention of archery. According to myth, Crotus often went hunting on horseback and lived among the Muses, who requested that Zeus place him in the sky, where he is seen demonstrating archery.

The arrow of this constellation points towards the star Antares, the "heart of the scorpion", and Sagittarius stands poised to attack should Scorpius ever attack the nearby Hercules, or to avenge Scorpius's slaying of Orion.

== Astrology ==
As of 2002, the Sun appears in the constellation Sagittarius from 18 December to 18 January. In tropical astrology, the Sun is considered to be in the sign Sagittarius from 22 November to 21 December, and in sidereal astrology, from 16 December to 14 January.

== See also ==
- Sagittarius (Chinese astronomy)
