= USS Arkab =

Crater-class cargo ship of the United States Navy

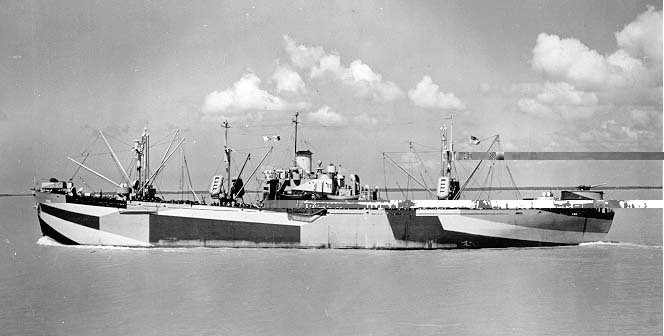
- USS Arkab (AK-130) underway, date and location unknown. Her camouflage is Measure 33 Design 9D.

History

United States
- Name: Warren Stone; Arkab
- Namesake: Warren Stone; Arkab
- Ordered: as a type (EC2-S-C1) hull, MCE hull 2449, SS Warren Stone
- Builder: Delta Shipbuilding Co., New Orleans, Louisiana
- Laid down: 4 December 1943
- Launched: 22 January 1944
- Sponsored by: Mrs. Charles E. Williams
- Acquired: 21 February 1944
- Commissioned: 21 February 1944
- Decommissioned: 25 February 1944
- In service: 15 May 1944
- Out of service: 2 January 1946
- Refit: converted for Naval service at Alabama Shipbuilding & Drydock Co., Mobile, AL.
- Stricken: 21 January 1946
- Identification: Hull symbol:AK-130
- Fate: Sold for scrapping, 21 September 1971, to N. V. Intershitra, Rotterdam, Netherlands

General characteristics
- Class & type: Crater-class cargo ship
- Displacement: 4,023 long tons (4,088 t) (standard); 14,550 long tons (14,780 t) (full load)
- Length: 441 ft 6 in (134.57 m)
- Beam: 56 ft 11 in (17.35 m)
- Draft: 28 ft 4 in (8.64 m)
- Installed power: 2 × Vogt header-type boilers, 220psi 450°; 2,500 shp (1,900 kW)
- Propulsion: 1 × Iron Fireman triple-expansion reciprocating steam engine; 1 × shaft
- Speed: 12.5 kn (23.2 km/h; 14.4 mph)
- Complement: 230
- Armament: 1 × 5 in (130 mm)/38-caliber dual-purpose gun; 1 × 3 in (76 mm)/50-caliber dual-purpose gun; 2 × 40 mm (1.6 in) 40mm Bofors anti-aircraft gun mounts; 12 × 20 mm (0.79 in) Oerlikon cannons anti-aircraft gun mounts

USS Arkab (AK-130) was a Crater-class cargo ship commissioned by the United States Navy for service in World War II, named after Arkab, the star in constellation Sagittarius. She was responsible for delivering troops, goods and equipment to locations in the war zone.

== Service history ==
Before the start of her construction, SS Warren Stone, a freighter built under a United States Maritime Commission contract (MCE hull 2449) at New Orleans, Louisiana, by the Delta Shipbuilding Co., was slated for Navy use, renamed Arkab, and designated AK-130 on 1 December 1943. Her keel was laid down on 4 December 1943; and the ship was launched on 22 January 1944; sponsored by Mrs. Charles E. Williams; acquired by the Navy; and commissioned on 21 February 1944 for passage to Mobile, Alabama; decommissioned there on 25 February 1944 for conversion by the Alabama Drydock and Shipbuilding Company; and recommissioned on 15 May 1944. Arkab held shakedown training in Chesapeake Bay through mid-June. She sailed on 30 June for the Pacific Ocean. After transiting the Panama Canal, Arkab moored at Pago Pago, Samoa, on 29 August. Cargo destined for New Caledonia was taken on board, and Arkab reached Nouméa on 10 September. There, she embarked 200 military passengers for transportation to the U.S. west coast.

Upon her arrival at San Francisco, California, Arkab underwent voyage repairs. On 10 November, she departed the West Coast of the United States on the first of a series of supply runs to bases in the Pacific. By the end of November 1945 the ship had steamed some 60,000 miles. Ports of call included Pearl Harbor; Manus Island, Admiralty Islands; Milne Bay and Langemak, New Guinea; Saipan; and Eniwetok. Although not equipped to accommodate troops, Arkab transported over 1,200 passengers during her career. The ship terminated the final voyage of her career at Norfolk, Virginia, on 16 December. Arkab was decommissioned on 2 January 1946, turned over to the War Shipping Administration for disposal, placed in the National Defense Reserve Fleet, and laid up in the James River berthing area. Her name was struck from the Navy list on 21 January 1946. She was sold on 21 September 1971 to N. V. Intershitra, of Rotterdam, Netherlands, and scrapped.
