= Beta2 Sagittarii =

Star in the constellation Sagittarius

Beta^{2} Sagittarii
- Location of β^{2} Sagittarii (circled)

Observation data Epoch J2000 Equinox ICRS
- Constellation: Sagittarius
- Right ascension: 19^{h} 23^{m} 13.13745^{s}
- Declination: −44° 47′ 59.2051″
- Apparent magnitude (V): +4.29

Characteristics
- Spectral type: F2/3 V or F2 III
- U−B color index: +0.07
- B−V color index: +0.34

Astrometry
Radial velocity (R_{v})	+19.0 km/s
Proper motion (μ)	RA: +93.45 mas/yr Dec.: −54.09 mas/yr
Parallax (π)	24.31±0.19 mas
Distance	134 ± 1 ly (41.1 ± 0.3 pc)
Absolute magnitude (M_{V})	+1.20

Details
Mass	1.43 M_{☉}
Luminosity	20 L_{☉}
Surface gravity (log g)	3.57 cgs
Temperature	7,035±239 K
Metallicity [Fe/H]	−0.54 dex
Rotational velocity (v sin i)	155 km/s
Age	933 Myr

Other designations
- Arkab Posterior, β^{2} Sgr, CD−45°13171, HD 181623, HIP 95294, HR 7343, SAO 229654

Database references
SIMBAD	data

Beta^{2} Sagittarii (β^{2} Sagittarii, abbreviated Beta^{2} Sgr, β^{2} Sgr) is a star in the southern zodiac constellation of Sagittarius. It is visible to the naked eye, having an apparent visual magnitude of +4.29. Based upon an annual parallax shift of 24.31 mas as seen from Earth, it is located 134 light-years from the Sun.

Based upon variations in its proper motion, this is a probable astrometric binary system. As such, its two components would be designated Beta^{2} Sagittarii A (officially named Arkab Posterior /ˈɑːrkæb pɒˈstɪəriər/, Arkab being the traditional name of the system) and B.

== Nomenclature ==
β^{2} Sagittarii (Latinised to Beta^{2} Sagittarii) is the system's Bayer designation. The designations of the two components as Beta^{2} Sagittarii A and B derive from the convention used by the Washington Multiplicity Catalog (WMC) for multiple star systems, and adopted by the International Astronomical Union (IAU).

In 2016, the International Astronomical Union organized a Working Group on Star Names (WGSN) to catalog and standardize proper names for stars. The WGSN approved the name Arkab Posterior for Beta^{2} Sagittarii on 5 October 2016 and it is now so included in the List of IAU-approved Star Names. For such names relating to members of multiple star systems, and where a component letter (from e.g. Washington Double Star Catalog) is not explicitly listed, the WGSN says that the name should be understood to be attributed to the brightest component by visual brightness.

In Chinese, 天淵 (Tiān Yuān), meaning Celestial Spring, refers to an asterism consisting of Beta^{2} Sagittarii, Beta^{1} Sagittarii and Alpha Sagittarii. Consequently, the Chinese name for Beta^{2} Sagittarii itself is 天淵一 (Tiān Yuān yī, English: the First Star of Celestial Spring.)

== Properties ==
Houk (1978) categorizes the visible component (Beta^{2} Sagittarii A) as an F-type main-sequence star with a stellar classification of F2/3 V. However, Malaroda (1975) lists it as an F-type giant star. It is spinning rapidly with a projected rotational velocity of 155 km/s. This is giving it an oblate shape with an equatorial bulge that is 22% larger than the polar radius. Beta^{2} Sagittarii has an estimated 1.4 times the mass of the Sun and is around 933 million years old.
