= Beta1 Sagittarii =

Binary star system in the constellation Sagittarius

Beta^{1} Sagittarii
- Location of β^{1} Sagittarii (circled)

Observation data Epoch J2000 Equinox ICRS
- Constellation: Sagittarius
- Right ascension: 19^{h} 22^{m} 38.29770^{s}
- Declination: −44° 27′ 32.2458″
- Apparent magnitude (V): +4.01

Characteristics
- Spectral type: B9 V + A5 V
- U−B color index: −0.39
- B−V color index: −0.10

Astrometry
Radial velocity (R_{v})	−10.7±2.7 km/s
Proper motion (μ)	RA: +13.67 mas/yr Dec.: −19.03 mas/yr
Parallax (π)	10.40±1.14 mas
Distance	approx. 310 ly (approx. 100 pc)
Absolute magnitude (M_{V})	−1.32

Details

β^{1} Sgr A
Mass	3.67±0.14 M_{☉}
Radius	2.73 R_{☉}
Luminosity	324 L_{☉}
Surface gravity (log g)	3.83 cgs
Temperature	11,960 K
Metallicity [Fe/H]	−0.35 dex
Rotational velocity (v sin i)	85±13 km/s
Age	224 Myr

β^{1} Sgr B
Radius	1.89 R_{☉}
Rotational velocity (v sin i)	140±21 km/s

Other designations
- Arkab Prior, β^{1} Sgr, CD−44°13277, FK5 1502, HD 181454, HIP 95241, HR 7337, SAO 229646, WDS J19226-4428A

Database references
SIMBAD	data

Beta^{1} Sagittarii, Latinized from β^{1} Sagittarii, is a binary star system in the southern zodiac constellation of Sagittarius, next to the southern constellation border with Telescopium. The brighter primary is named Arkab Prior /ˈɑːrkæb ˈpraɪər/, Arkab being the traditional name of the system. It is visible to the naked eye with a combined apparent visual magnitude of +4.01. Based upon an annual parallax shift of 10.40 mas as seen from Earth, it is located roughly 310 light-years from the Sun. At Beta^{1} Sagittarii's distance, the visual magnitude is diminished by an extinction factor of 0.17 due to interstellar dust.

The pair of stars that constitute this system have an angular separation of 28.3 arc seconds, with an estimated physical separation of about 3,290 AU. The primary, Beta^{1} Sagittarii A, is a B-type main sequence star with a stellar classification of B9 V. It is about 95% of the way through its lifespan on the main sequence. The star has around 3.7 times the mass of the Sun and 2.7 times the Sun's radius. It is an estimated 224 million years old and is spinning with a projected rotational velocity of 85 km/s. The star is radiating 324 times the luminosity of the Sun from its photosphere at an effective temperature of 11,960 K.

The companion, Beta^{1} Sagittarii B, is a magnitude 7.4 A-type main sequence star with a class of A5 V. It has 1.89 times the radius of the Sun and may be spinning faster than the primary with a projected rotational velocity of 140 km/s.

== Nomenclature ==
β^{1} Sagittarii (Latinised to Beta^{1} Sagittarii) is the system's Bayer designation. The designations of the two components as Beta^{1} Sagittarii A and B derive from the convention used by the Washington Multiplicity Catalog (WMC) for multiple star systems, and adopted by the International Astronomical Union (IAU).

In 2016, the International Astronomical Union organized a Working Group on Star Names (WGSN) to catalog and standardize proper names for stars. The WGSN approved the name Arkab Prior for Beta^{1} Sagittarii on 5 October 2016 and it is now so included in the List of IAU-approved Star Names. For such names relating to members of multiple star systems, and where a component letter (from e.g. Washington Double Star Catalog) is not explicitly listed, the WGSN says that the name should be understood to be attributed to the brightest component by visual brightness.

In Chinese, 天淵 (Tiān Yuān), meaning Celestial Spring, refers to an asterism consisting of Beta^{1} Sagittarii, Beta^{2} Sagittarii and Alpha Sagittarii. Consequently, the Chinese name for Beta^{1} Sagittarii itself is 天淵二 (Tiān Yuān èr, English: the Second Star of Celestial Spring.)
