= 43 Sagittarii =

Star in the constellation of Sagittarius

- Location of 43 Sagittarii (circled)

Observation data Epoch J2000 Equinox ICRS
- Constellation: Sagittarius
- Right ascension: 19^{h} 17^{m} 38.07906^{s}
- Declination: −18° 57′ 10.4626″
- Apparent magnitude (V): 4.88

Characteristics
- Spectral type: G8II-III
- U−B color index: +0.81
- B−V color index: +1.02

Astrometry
Radial velocity (R_{v})	+15.20 km/s
Proper motion (μ)	RA: −10.341 mas/yr Dec.: −10.892 mas/yr
Parallax (π)	6.9681±0.1875 mas
Distance	470 ± 10 ly (144 ± 4 pc)
Absolute magnitude (M_{V})	-0.96

Details
Mass	3.30 M_{☉}
Radius	23.99 R_{☉}
Luminosity	277 L_{☉}
Surface gravity (log g)	2.22 cgs
Temperature	4,813 K
Metallicity [Fe/H]	−0.18 dex
Rotational velocity (v sin i)	4.2 km/s
Age	350±100 Myr

Other designations
- d Sgr, 43 Sgr, BD−19°5379, GC 26589, HD 180540, HIP 94820, HR 7304, SAO 162413, GSC 06304-00334

Database references
SIMBAD	data

43 Sagittarii is a single star in the southern constellation of Sagittarius. It has the Bayer designation d Sagittarii, while 43 Sagittarii is the Flamsteed designation. This object is visible to the naked eye as a faint, yellow-hued star with an apparent visual magnitude of 4.88. From parallax measurements, it is estimated to lie around 470 light years away from the Sun. The star is drifting further from the Earth with a heliocentric radial velocity of +15.2 km/s. It is located near the ecliptic and thus is subject to lunar occultations.

This is an aging giant/bright giant star with a stellar classification of G8II-III, and is most likely (97% chance) on the horizontal branch. It is around 350 million years old with 3.3 times the mass of the Sun. Having exhausted the supply of hydrogen at its core, the star has expanded to 24 times the Sun's radius and is now generating energy through core helium fusion. It is radiating 277 times the luminosity of the Sun from its swollen photosphere at an effective temperature of 4,813 K.
