= Rho1 Sagittarii =

Star in the constellation Sagittarius

ρ^{1} Sagittarii
- Location of ρ^{1} Sagittarii (circled)

Observation data Epoch J2000 Equinox ICRS
- Constellation: Sagittarius
- Right ascension: 19^{h} 21^{m} 40.35942^{s}
- Declination: −17° 50′ 49.9168″
- Apparent magnitude (V): 3.93

Characteristics
- Spectral type: A9IV
- U−B color index: +0.14
- B−V color index: +0.22
- Variable type: δ Sct

Astrometry
Radial velocity (R_{v})	+1.20 km/s
Proper motion (μ)	RA: −25.87 mas/yr Dec.: +21.46 mas/yr
Parallax (π)	25.69±0.19 mas
Distance	127.0 ± 0.9 ly (38.9 ± 0.3 pc)
Absolute magnitude (M_{V})	0.97

Details
Mass	1.91 M_{☉}
Radius	3.31+0.24 −0.26 R_{☉}
Luminosity	30.7±0.8 L_{☉}
Surface gravity (log g)	3.89 cgs
Temperature	7,469+201 −261 K
Metallicity [Fe/H]	−0.02 dex
Rotational velocity (v sin i)	68 km/s
Age	893 Myr

Other designations
- Kenemu, ρ^{1} Sgr, 44 Sagittarii, BD−18°5322, GC 26694, GJ 4107, HD 181577, HIP 95168, HR 7340, SAO 162512, PPM 235882, GSC 06301-02457

Database references
SIMBAD	data

Rho^{1} Sagittarii, Latinized from ρ^{1} Sagittarii, formally named Kenemu, is a single, variable star in the southern constellation of Sagittarius. It has a white hue and is visible to the naked eye with an apparent visual magnitude that fluctuates around 3.93. The distance to this star is approximately 127 light years based on parallax, and it is drifting further away with a radial velocity of +1.2 km/s. It is positioned near the ecliptic and so it can be occulted by the Moon.

This object has a stellar classification of A9IV, matching a subgiant star that is evolving away from the main sequence. It is a low amplitude Delta Scuti variable, ranging from 3.94 to 3.90 magnitude with a period of 0.05 days. The star is 893 million years old and is spinning with a projected rotational velocity of 68 km/s. It has 1.9 times the mass of the Sun and 3.3 times the Sun's radius. The star is radiating 31 times the luminosity of the Sun from its photosphere at an effective temperature of 7,469 K.

Kenemu was the name of the 17th decan in ancient Egyptian astronomy, represented by a small group of stars around ρ^{1} Sagittarii. The IAU Working Group on Star Names adopted the name Kenemu for this star on 13 August 2026.
