= List of stars in Equuleus =

This is the list of notable stars in the constellation Equuleus, sorted by decreasing brightness.

Name	B	F	G.	Var	HD	HIP	RA	Dec	vis. mag.	abs. mag.	Dist. (ly)	Sp. class	Notes
α Equ	α	8	20		202447	104987	21^{h} 15^{m} 49.40^{s}	+05° 14′ 53.1″	3.92	0.14	186	G0III+...	Kitalpha, Kitel Phard, Kitalphar; spectroscopic binary
δ Equ	δ	7	19		202275	104858	21^{h} 14^{m} 28.79^{s}	+10° 00′ 27.8″	4.47	3.14	60	F5V+...	Tepennekhet, spectroscopic binary
γ Equ	γ	5	15		201601	104521	21^{h} 10^{m} 20.47^{s}	+10° 07′ 55.0″	4.70	1.97	115	F0p	double star; Rapidly oscillating Ap star, V_{max} = 4.70^{m}, V_{min} = 4.71^{m}, P = 0.00811 d
β Equ	β	10	29		203562	105570	21^{h} 22^{m} 53.58^{s}	+06° 48′ 40.0″	5.16	−0.05	360	A3V	multiple star
ε Equ	ε	1	4		199766	103569	20^{h} 59^{m} 04.54^{s}	+04° 17′ 37.8″	5.30	1.40	197	F5III...	spectroscopic binary
3 Equ	ζ	3	8		200644	104031	21^{h} 04^{m} 34.64^{s}	+05° 30′ 10.3″	5.63	−0.99	688	K5III	double star
9 Equ	η	9	24		203291	105413	21^{h} 21^{m} 04.80^{s}	+07° 21′ 16.4″	5.81	−1.75	1058	M2III	suspected variable; V_{max} = 5.86^{m}, V_{min} = 5.91^{m}
4 Equ		4	9		200790	104101	21^{h} 05^{m} 26.79^{s}	+05° 57′ 30.6″	5.94	3.10	120	F8V	double star
HD 202951					202951	105224	21^{h} 18^{m} 52.01^{s}	+11° 12′ 12.0″	5.97	−1.96	1254	K5III	rotating variable, V_{max} = 5.96^{m}, V_{min} = 6.01^{m}
HD 199942			5		199942	103652	21^{h} 00^{m} 03.95^{s}	+07° 30′ 58.2″	5.98	1.69	235	A7V	double star
6 Equ		6	15		201616	104538	21^{h} 10^{m} 31.31^{s}	+10° 02′ 56.0″	6.07	0.24	479	A2Vs	Protome, optical double with γ Equ
HD 201298			12		201298	104357	21^{h} 08^{m} 28.15^{s}	+06° 59′ 21.7″	6.14	−0.89	832	M0III	
HD 203842			30		203842	105695	21^{h} 24^{m} 24.52^{s}	+10° 10′ 27.1″	6.33	1.21	344	F5III	
HD 200661			7		200661	104041	21^{h} 04^{m} 41.63^{s}	+02° 56′ 32.1″	6.41	0.97	400	K0	
HD 201507			13		201507	104481	21^{h} 09^{m} 58.26^{s}	+02° 56′ 37.0″	6.44	1.63	299	F2V	
HD 200964	θ		10		200964	104202	21^{h} 06^{m} 39.79^{s}	+03° 48′ 10.8″	6.64	2.35	223	K0IV	has two planets (b & c)
2 Equ	λ	2			200256	103813	21^{h} 02^{m} 12.51^{s}	+07° 10′ 47.3″	6.72	1.68	332	F8	double star
HD 202908					202908	105200	21^{h} 18^{m} 34.87^{s}	+11° 34′ 7.8″	7.01	3.63	155	G0V + G6V	triple star
Gliese 818					200779	104092	21^{h} 05^{m} 20^{s}	+07° 04′ 09″	8.27	7.41	48	K6V	multiple star
HD 203473					203473	105521	21^{h} 22^{m} 18.9^{s}	+05° 01′ 25″	8.23	4.20	237	G6V	is orbited by a small star of brown dwarf, (b)
S Equ				S	199454	103419	20^{h} 57^{m} 12.84^{s}	+05° 04′ 49.4″	8.37	-0.57	2000	B9V + F9III-IV	Algol variable, V_{max} = 8.35^{m}, V_{min} = 10.40^{m}, P = 3.4360969 d
SY Equ				SY	203664	105614	21^{h} 23^{m} 28.81^{s}	+09° 55′ 54.9″	8.53	-2.02	4200	B0.5IIIn	Beta Cephei variable, V_{max} = 8.520^{m}, V_{min} = 8.585^{m}, P = 0.1658677 d
R Equ				R	202051		21^{h} 13^{m} 11.77^{s}	+12° 48′ 08.77″	8.70	4		M3e	Mira variable, V_{max} = 8.4^{m}, V_{min} = 15.0^{m}, P = 262.28 d
WASP-90							21^{h} 02^{m} 08.0^{s}	+07° 03′ 24″	11.7		1109	F6	has a transiting planet (b)
HAT-P-65							21^{h} 03^{m} 37.0^{s}	+11° 59′ 22″	13.15	3.53	2743		has a transiting planet (b)
U Equ				U			20^{h} 57^{m} 16.2^{s}	+02° 58′ 45″	14.5	3.57	5000	M	slow irregular variable, V_{max} = 13.4^{m}, V_{min} = 14.5^{m}
Table legend: • Name = Proper name • B = Bayer designation • F or/and G. = Flamsteed designation or Gould designation • Var = Variable-star designation • HD = Henry Draper Catalogue designation number • HIP = Hipparcos Catalogue designation number • RA = Right ascension for the Epoch/Equinox J2000.0 • Dec = Declination for the Epoch/Equinox J2000.0 • vis. mag. = visual magnitude (m or m_{v}), also known as apparent magnitude • abs. mag. = absolute magnitude (M_{v}) • Dist. (ly) = Distance in light-years from Earth • Sp. class = Spectral class of the star in the stellar classification system • Notes = Common name(s) or alternate name(s); comments; notable properties [for example: multiple star status, range of variability if it is a variable star, exoplanets, etc.]

== See also ==
- List of stars by constellation
