= Equuleus in Chinese astronomy =

Constellation

According to traditional Chinese uranography, the modern constellation Equuleus is located within the northern quadrant of the sky, which is symbolized as the Black Tortoise of the North (北方玄武, Běi Fāng Xuán Wǔ).

The name of the western constellation in modern Chinese is 小馬座 (xiǎo mǎ zuò), meaning "the colt constellation".

== Stars ==
The map of Chinese constellation in constellation Equuleus area consists of :

Four Symbols	Mansion (Chinese name)	Romanization	Translation	Asterisms (Chinese name)	Romanization	Translation	Western star name	Proper Name	Chinese star name	Romanization	Translation
Black Tortoise of the North (北方玄武)	虛	Xū	Emptiness	虛	Xū	Emptiness					
Black Tortoise of the North (北方玄武)	虛	Xū	Emptiness	虛	Xū	Emptiness	α Equ	Kitalpha	虚宿二	Xūsùèr	2nd star
Black Tortoise of the North (北方玄武)	虛	Xū	Emptiness	虛	Xū	Emptiness	λ Equ		虚宿增一	Xūsùzēngyī	1st additional star
Black Tortoise of the North (北方玄武)	虛	Xū	Emptiness	虛	Xū	Emptiness	4 Equ		虚宿增二	Xūsùzēngèr	2nd additional star
Black Tortoise of the North (北方玄武)	虛	Xū	Emptiness	虛	Xū	Emptiness	3 Equ		虚宿增三	Xūsùzēngsān	3rd additional star
Black Tortoise of the North (北方玄武)	虛	Xū	Emptiness	虛	Xū	Emptiness	ε Equ		虚宿增四	Xūsùzēngsì	4th additional star
Black Tortoise of the North (北方玄武)	虛	Xū	Emptiness	司危	Sīwēi	Deified Judge of Disaster and Good Fortune					
Black Tortoise of the North (北方玄武)	虛	Xū	Emptiness	司危	Sīwēi	Deified Judge of Disaster and Good Fortune	β Equ		司危一	Sīwēiyī	1st star
Black Tortoise of the North (北方玄武)	虛	Xū	Emptiness	司危	Sīwēi	Deified Judge of Disaster and Good Fortune	9 Equ		司危二	Sīwēièr	2nd star
Black Tortoise of the North (北方玄武)	虛	Xū	Emptiness	司非	Sīfēi	Deified Judge of Right and Wrong					
Black Tortoise of the North (北方玄武)	虛	Xū	Emptiness	司非	Sīfēi	Deified Judge of Right and Wrong	γ Equ		司非一	Sīfēiyī	1st star
Black Tortoise of the North (北方玄武)	虛	Xū	Emptiness	司非	Sīfēi	Deified Judge of Right and Wrong	δ Equ	Tepennekhet	司非二	Sīfēièr	2nd star
Black Tortoise of the North (北方玄武)	虛	Xū	Emptiness	司非	Sīfēi	Deified Judge of Right and Wrong	6 Equ	Protome	司非增一	Sīfēizēngyī	1st additional star

== See also ==
- Chinese astronomy
- Traditional Chinese star names
- Chinese constellations
