= NGC 7015 =

Spiral galaxy in the constellation Equuleus

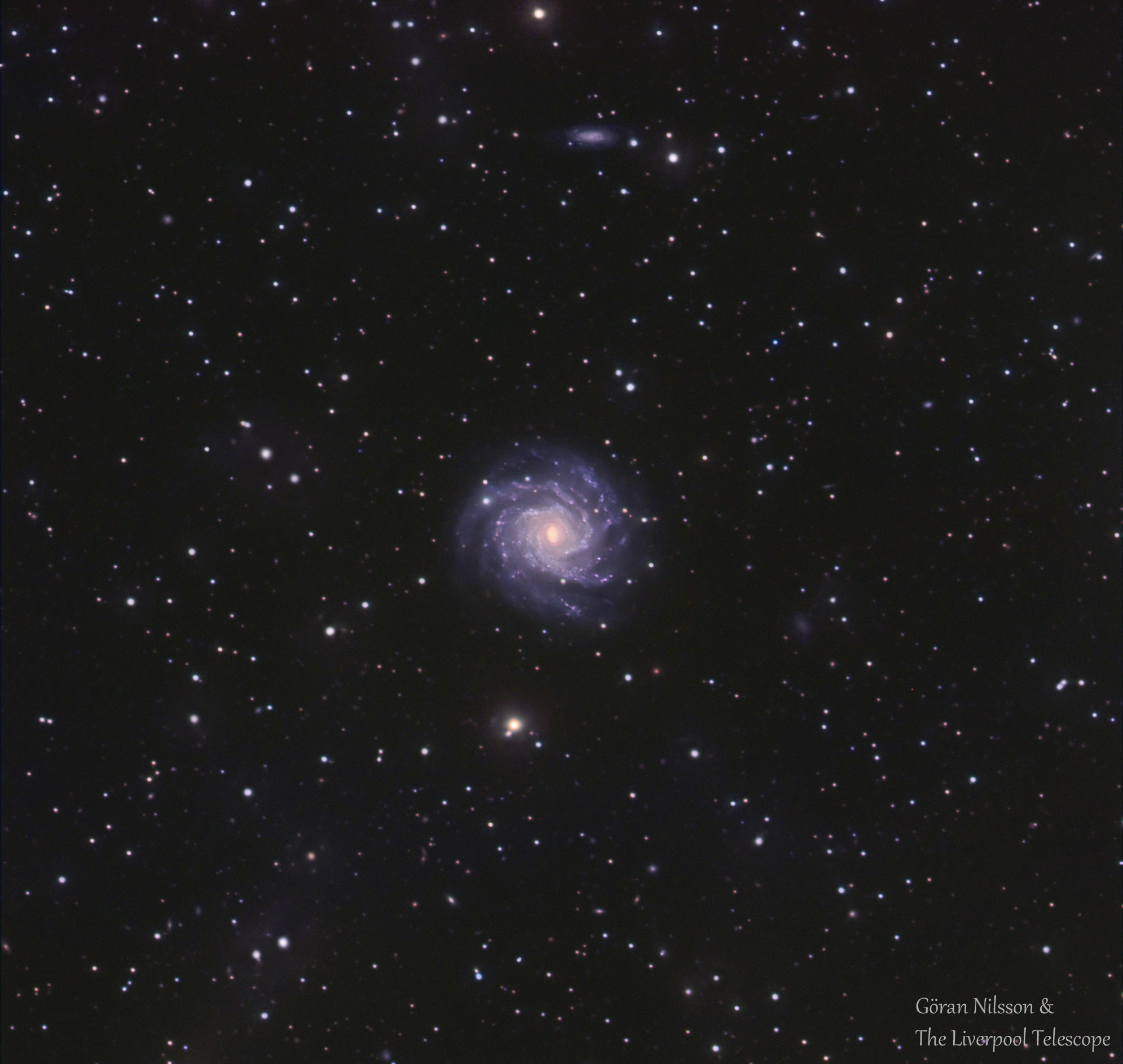
- The galaxy NGC 7015.

Observation data (J2000 epoch)
- Constellation: Equuleus
- Right ascension: 21^{h} 05^{m} 37.4^{s}
- Declination: 11° 24′ 51″
- Redshift: 0.016281
- Heliocentric radial velocity: 4,881 km/s
- Distance: 203 Mly (62.3 Mpc)
- Apparent magnitude (V): 13.25

Characteristics
- Type: Sbc
- Mass: 8.6×10^{10} (Stellar mass) M_{☉}
- Size: ~50,700 ly (15.53 kpc) (estimated)
- Apparent size (V): 1.9 x 1.6

Other designations
- IRAS 21032+1112, UGC 11674, MCG 2-53-12, PGC 66076, CGCG 425-40

NGC 7015 is a spiral galaxy located about 203 million light-years away from Earth in the constellation Equuleus. NGC 7015's calculated velocity is 4,881 km/s (3,033 mi/s). NGC 7015 was discovered by French astronomer Édouard Stephan on September 29, 1878.

NGC 7015 has two symmetric inner arms, with multiple long and continuous outer arms. It is also host to a supermassive black hole with an estimated mass of 8.2 × 10^{7} M_{☉}. NGC 7015 is a member of a group of galaxies known as the NGC 7042 Group. This group contains ten galaxies, with the group named after its brightest member, NGC 7042. Besides NGC 7015, the group also contains, NGC 7025, NGC 7042, NGC 7043, and IC 1359.

== See also ==
- NGC 1300
- Barred spiral galaxy
- NGC 7003
- List of NGC objects (7001–7840)
