= NGC 4612 =

Galaxy in the constellation Virgo

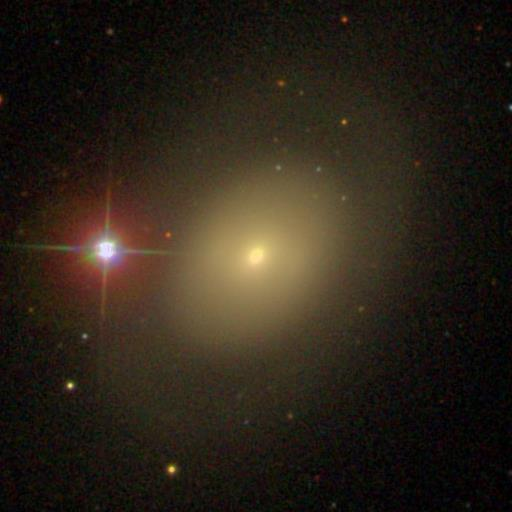
- SDSS image of NGC 4612.

Observation data (J2000 epoch)
- Constellation: Virgo
- Right ascension: 12^{h} 41^{m} 32.7^{s}
- Declination: 07° 18′ 54″
- Redshift: 0.005921/1775 km/s
- Distance: 57,166,550 ly
- Group or cluster: Virgo Cluster
- Apparent magnitude (V): 12.3

Characteristics
- Type: (R)SAB0^0
- Size: ~40,840.24 ly (estimated)
- Apparent size (V): 2.17 x 1.38

Other designations
- PGC 42574, UGC 7850, VCC 1883

NGC 4612 is a barred lenticular galaxy located about 57 million light-years away in the constellation of Virgo. NGC 4612 was discovered by astronomer William Herschel on January 23, 1784. The galaxy is a member of the Virgo Cluster.

== Physical characteristics ==
NGC 4612 has a diffuse bar embedded in a small, bright nucleus. Surrounding the nucleus, there is a very low-surface-brightness ring.

== See also ==
- List of NGC objects (4001–5000)
- NGC 4429- another lenticular galaxy in the Virgo Cluster
- NGC 7020
