= NGC 7065 =

Galaxy in the constellation Aquarius

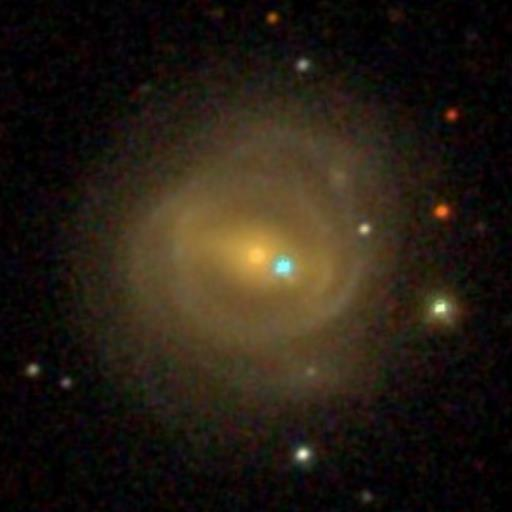
- The barred spiral galaxy NGC 7065 as imaged by the SDSS.

Observation data (J2000 epoch)
- Constellation: Aquarius
- Right ascension: 21^{h} 26^{m} 42.5^{s}
- Declination: −06° 59′ 42″
- Redshift: 0.025067
- Heliocentric radial velocity: 7,515 km/s
- Distance: 320 Mly
- Apparent magnitude (V): 13.1

Characteristics
- Type: SB(r)ab?
- Apparent size (V): 1.0 x 0.9

Other designations
- MCG -1-54-17, NPM1G -07.0504, PGC 66766

NGC 7065 Is a barred spiral galaxy located about 320 million light-years away in the constellation of Aquarius. NGC 7065 is part of a pair of galaxies that contains the galaxy NGC 7065A. NGC 7065 was discovered by astronomer Albert Marth on August 3, 1864.

== See also ==
- NGC 7042
- List of NGC objects (7001–7840)
