= PG 2112+059 =

Seyfert galaxy and quasar located in the constellation of Equuleus

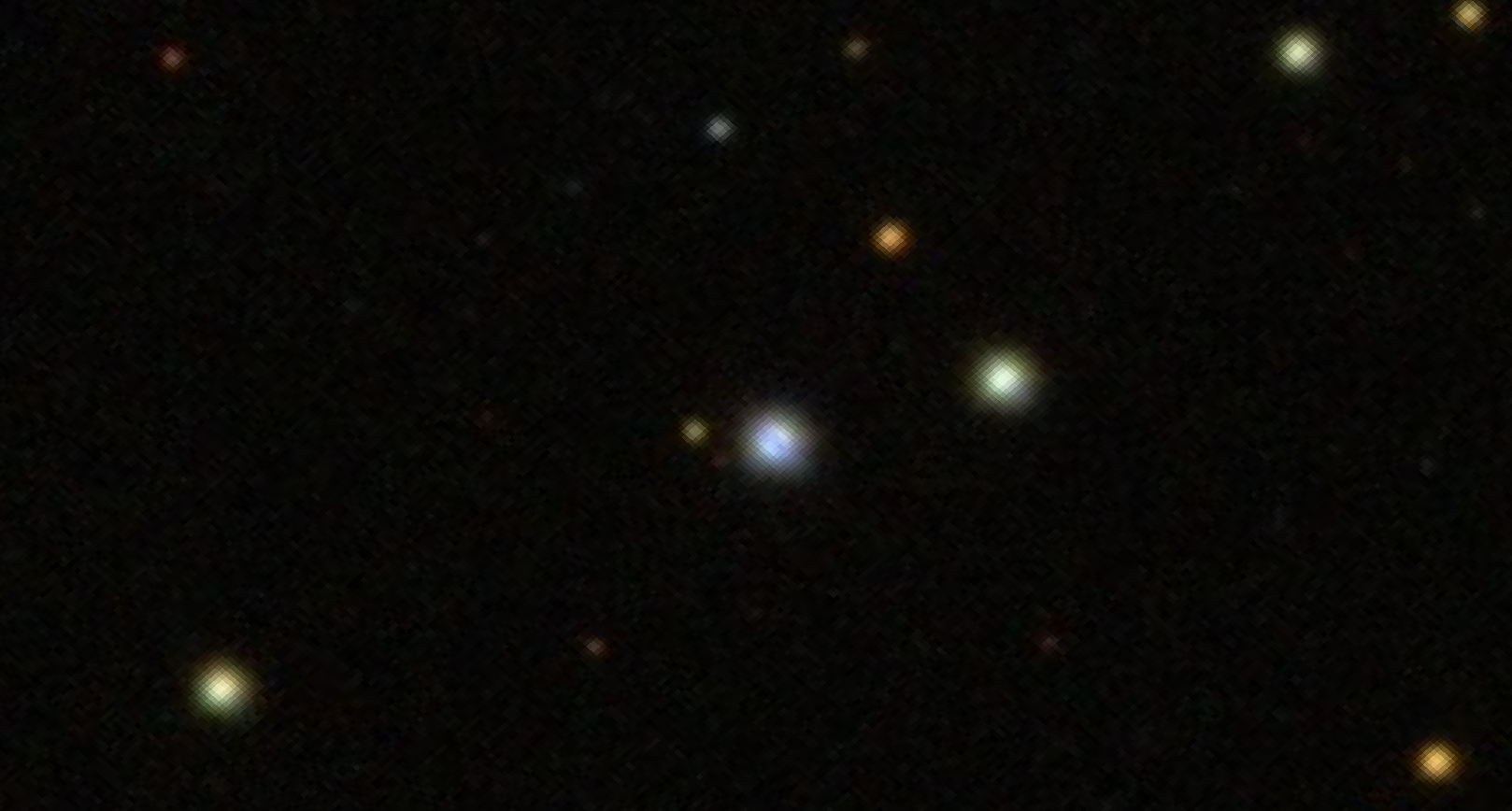
- SDSS image of PG 2112+059.

Observation data (J2000.0 epoch)
- Constellation: Equuleus
- Right ascension: 21^{h} 14^{m} 52.58^{s}
- Declination: +06° 07′ 42.36″
- Redshift: 0.459000
- Heliocentric radial velocity: 137,605 km/s
- Distance: 4.889 Gly
- Apparent magnitude (V): 15.77

Characteristics
- Type: BAL

Other designations
- 2MASS J21145258+0607423, KODIAQ J211452+060742, 2XMM J211452.5+060742, 2CXO J211452.5+060742

PG 2112+059 is a Seyfert type 1 galaxy located in the northern constellation of Equuleus. The object has a redshift of (z) 0.459 estimating a light-travel time of 4.88 billion light-years from Earth and was first discovered in 1983 by astronomers from the Bright Quasar Survey (BQS). It is also classified as a broad absorption-line quasar (BAL) because it displays broad absorption lines in its spectrum.

== Description ==
PG 2112+059 is a high ionization broad absorption-line quasar (HiBAL). Although X-ray weak, it has signs of X-ray spectral variability with it displaying a normal X-ray continuum like other radio-quiet quasars, according to observations. Evidence also pointed out, there is also a decrease to its continuum normalization by 3.5, with the absorption column density rising upwards. A weak iron fluorescent line was detected based on observations of its X-ray spectra suggesting it was caused through reflection of a neutral material. The spectra itself is interpreted by two scenarios; either by ionized layers or reflection of its ionized accretion disk. A deep minimal state was recorded for the quasar in 2003 with a decreased flux in 0.2-12 KeV.

The host galaxy of PG 2112+059 is best described as a luminous elliptical galaxy based on its elliptical profile measurement with a supermassive black hole mass of 9 × 10^{9} M_{☉}. Its radial profile is found to be fitted by a modified deVaucoulers's law profile and it has a spheroid appearance with no signs of elongation. It has a companion galaxy located nearby from it by 16 arcseconds away with a suggestion of a bar-like extension located within the inner section of quasar host itself, given the difference in axis direction. Two other companion galaxies are located by 10 arcseconds away from the quasar's nucleus.

The quasar displays evidence of broad emission bands in its spectra. When observed with mid-infrared spectroscopy obtained with Spitzer Space Telescope, it shown to have traces of ionized magnesium amorphous silicates, as well as detections of corundum suggesting the clear evidence of clumpy structures located in the dust forming regions of the quasar. Additionally, periclase elements were also found, indicating they were formed through the cooling process of interstellar dust forming gas.
