= U Equulei =

Variable star in the constellation Equuleus

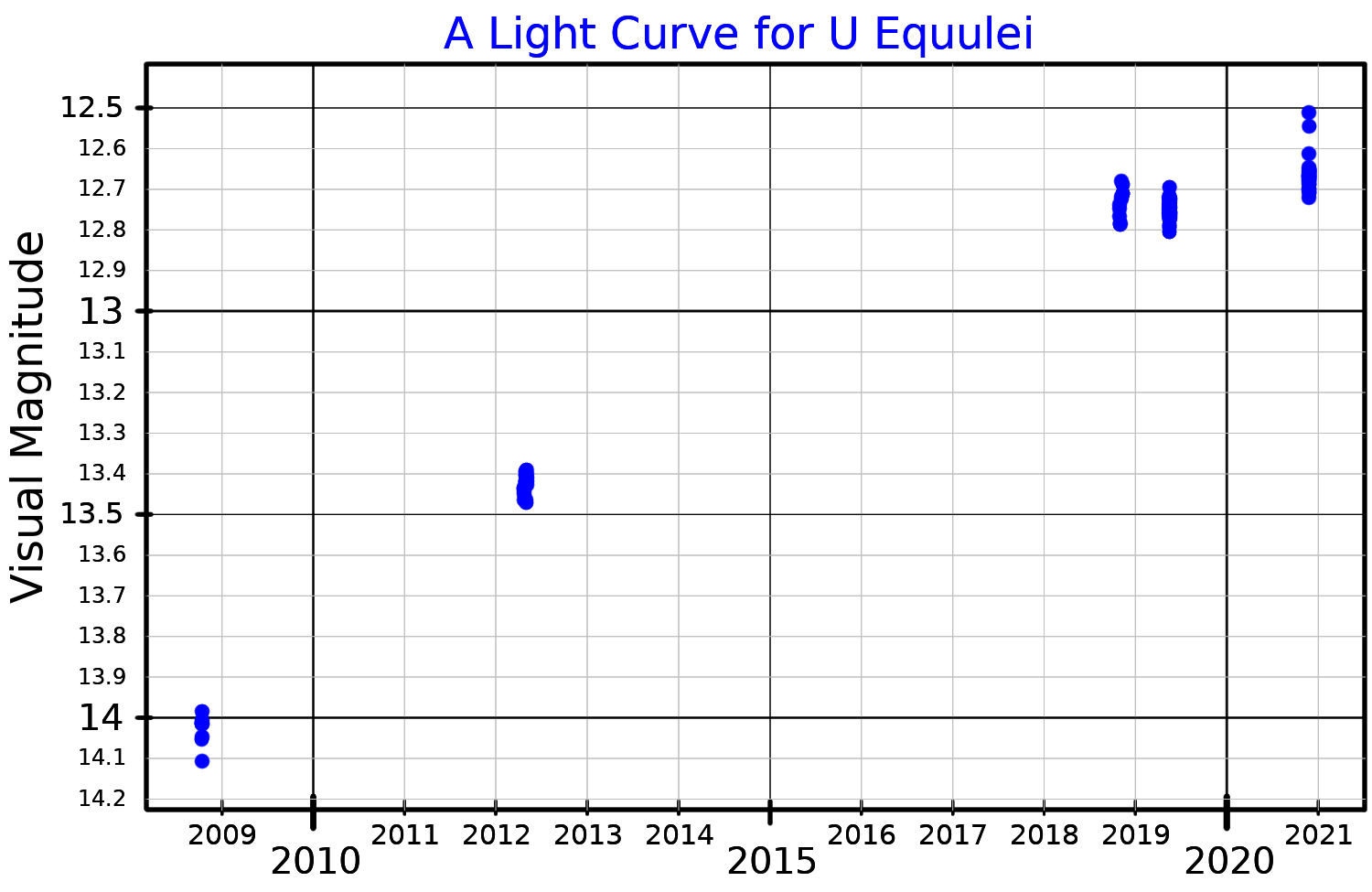
- A visual band light curve for U Equulei, plotted from OMC data

Observation data Epoch J2000 Equinox ICRS
- Constellation: Equuleus
- Right ascension: 20^{h} 57^{m} 16.28^{s}
- Declination: +02° 58′ 44.6″
- Apparent magnitude (V): 9 - 13

Characteristics
- Evolutionary stage: (post?) AGB
- Spectral type: G - K III
- B−V color index: +1.6
- Variable type: Lb

Astrometry
| Radial velocity (R_{v}) | −75 km/s |
| Proper motion (μ) | RA: 10.490 mas/yr Dec.: −10.433 mas/yr |
| Parallax (π) | 0.0985±0.0750 mas |
| Distance | 3,340±700 pc |

Details
| Luminosity | 6,000 L_{☉} |
| Temperature | 5,005 K |

Other designations
- IRAS 20547+0247, 2MASS J20571628+0258445, Gaia DR2 1731164844433296128

Database references
| SIMBAD | data |

U Equulei (U Equ / IRAS 20547+0247) is a variable star in the constellation Equuleus with an apparent magnitude of +14.50 in the B band. It lies at an estimated distance of 5,000 light-years (1,500 parsecs) from the Solar System.

== Properties ==
U Equulei is, or was, an OH/IR star, and strong OH and H_{2}O masers have been observed. These vary to a greater extent than almost any other star observed, and it is possible that the stage of maser activity is essentially finished.

== Hypothetical planet ==
Lionel Siess and Mario Livio suggested that the accretion of a giant planet towards the increasing red giant has made the star's outer layers rotate fast enough to cause an outpouring equatorial- or disk-expansion, responsible for the star's peculiar environment. The spectroscopic study has indicated the star is surrounded by the dust shell, but shape of the shell cannot be measured due to large distance to the star.

== See also ==
- List of stars in Equuleus
