= HD 201298 =

Star in the constellation Equuleus

- Location of HD 201298 (circled)

Observation data Epoch J2000 Equinox ICRS
- Constellation: Equuleus
- Right ascension: 21^{h} 08^{m} 28.1388^{s}
- Declination: +06° 59′ 21.695″
- Apparent magnitude (V): 6.14

Characteristics
- Evolutionary stage: red giant branch?
- Spectral type: M0 III
- U−B color index: +1.97
- B−V color index: +1.66

Astrometry
Radial velocity (R_{v})	20 ± 2 km/s
Proper motion (μ)	RA: −10.643 mas/yr Dec.: +2.479 mas/yr
Parallax (π)	2.8646±0.0533 mas
Distance	1,140 ± 20 ly (349 ± 6 pc)
Absolute magnitude (M_{V})	−0.39

Details
Mass	1.83 M_{☉}
Radius	117 R_{☉}
Luminosity	1,648 L_{☉}
Surface gravity (log g)	0.413 cgs
Temperature	3,732 K
Rotational velocity (v sin i)	4.5 ± 1 km/s

Other designations
- 12 G. Equueli, AG+06°2888, BD+06°4754, FK5 3692, GC 29548, HD 201298, HIP 104357, HR 8090, SAO 126566

Database references
SIMBAD	data

HD 201298 (HR 8090) is a solitary star located in the northern constellation Equuleus, just next to 3 Equulei. It has an apparent magnitude of 6.14, making it barely visible to the naked eye under ideal conditions. The star is situated at a distance of 1,140 light years but is drifting away with a heliocentric radial velocity of 20 km/s.

HD 201298 has a stellar classification of M0 III, indicating that it is ageing M-type star that is probably on the red giant branch. As a result, it has expanded to 117 times the Sun's girth. At present it has 1.83 times the mass of the Sun and shines with a luminosity of 1,648 L_{☉} from its enlarged photosphere at an effective temperature of 3,732 K, which gives it an orange glow. HD 201298 spins leisurely with a projected rotational velocity of 4.5±1 km/s, slightly faster than most giants.
