= HD 201585 =

Star in Equuleus

Observation data Epoch J2000.0 Equinox J2000.0 (ICRS)
- Constellation: Equuleus
- Right ascension: 21^{h} 10^{m} 12.37231^{s}
- Declination: +10° 44′ 19.9495″
- Apparent magnitude (V): 8.23±0.01

Characteristics
- Evolutionary stage: main sequence
- Spectral type: A8
- B−V color index: 0.271±0.015
- Variable type: planetary transit

Astrometry
Radial velocity (R_{v})	14.0±0.2 km/s
Proper motion (μ)	RA: −5.691 mas/yr Dec.: +5.066 mas/yr
Parallax (π)	5.4889±0.0237 mas
Distance	594 ± 3 ly (182.2 ± 0.8 pc)
Absolute magnitude (M_{V})	+1.81

Details
Mass	1.90^{+0.06}_{−0.07} M_{☉}
Radius	2.1±0.2 R_{☉}
Luminosity	12.0^{+0.9}_{−1.1} L_{☉}
Surface gravity (log g)	4.09±0.14 cgs
Temperature	7,490±150 K
Metallicity [Fe/H]	0.00 dex
Rotational velocity (v sin i)	109±4 km/s
Age	800±200 Myr

Other designations
- AG+10°2841, BD+10°4478, GC 29588, HD 201585, HIP 104513, SAO 106887, TIC 354619337

Database references
SIMBAD	data
Exoplanet Archive	data

HD 201585 is a star located in the equatorial constellation Equuleus. It has an apparent magnitude of 8.23, making it readily visible in small telescopes but not to the naked eye. Gaia DR3 parallax measurements imply a distance of 594 light-years and it is currently receding with a heliocentric radial velocity of 14 km/s. At its current distance, HD 201585's brightness is diminished by three-tenths of a magnitudes due to interstellar extinction and it has an absolute magnitude of +1.81. HD 201585 is the star's Henry Draper Catalogue designation. It is also designated as MASCARA-1 meaning that it is the first star observed by the MASCARA exoplanet search program.

HD 201585 has a stellar classification of A3, indicating that it is an A-type star. However, later observations of the star's physical properties revealed a cooler class of A8. It has 1.9 times the mass of the Sun and 2.1 times the radius of the Sun. It radiates 12 times the luminosity of the Sun from its photosphere at an effective temperature of 7,490 K, giving it the typical white hue of an A-type star. HD 201585 either has a solar metallicity or an iron abundance of [Fe/H] = +0.15, depending on the source. Unfortunately, the latter value is poorly constrained. The star is estimated to be approximately 800 million years old and like most hot stars, it spins rapidly with a projected rotational velocity of 109 km/s.

== Planetary system ==
HD 201585 b, also known as MASCARA-1b, was discovered around 2016 after astronomer G. J. J. Talens and colleagues observed planetary transit signals coming from HD 201585; its discovery was announced on July 13, 2017. It is a hot Jupiter with 3.7 times the mass of Jupiter and 1.60 times the radius of Jupiter. MASCARA-1b has a measured equilibrium temperature of 2,594±2 K. A 2022 study conducted on the planet found that it was unusually reflective for a hot Jupiter, having a geometric albedo of 0.171+0.066
−0.068. Attempts to characterize its spectrum around the same year in a different study have failed due to MASCARA-1b's high surface gravity, resulting in a compact planetary atmosphere.

The HD 201585 planetary system
Companion (in order from star)	Mass	Semimajor axis (AU)	Orbital period (days)	Eccentricity	Inclination	Radius
HD 201585/MASCARA-1b	3.7±0.9 M_{J}	0.040352^{+0.000046}_{−0.000049}	2.1487738±0.0000009	0.00034^{+0.00034}_{−0.00023}	88.45±0.17°	1.597^{+0.018}_{−0.019} R_{J}
