= NGC 7053 =

Galaxy in the constellation Pegasus

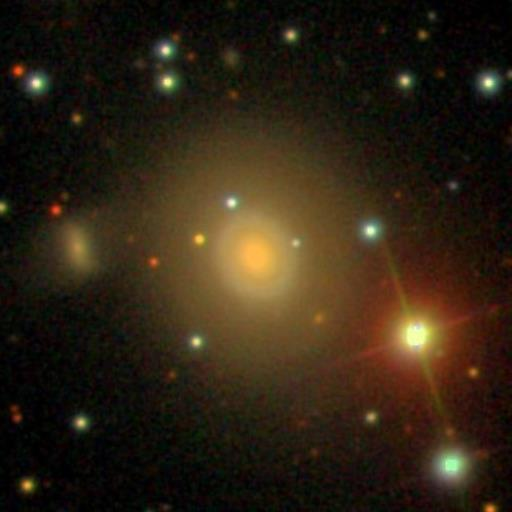
- SDSS image of NGC 7053.

Observation data (J2000 epoch)
- Constellation: Pegasus
- Right ascension: 21^{h} 21^{m} 07.6^{s}
- Declination: 23° 05′ 05″
- Redshift: 0.015704
- Heliocentric radial velocity: 4,708 km/s
- Distance: 195.6 Mly
- Apparent magnitude (V): 14.02

Characteristics
- Type: S?
- Size: ~101,420 ly (estimated)
- Apparent size (V): 1.4 x 1.3

Other designations
- 2ZW 124, CGCG 471-8, IRAS 21188+2252, MCG 4-50-9, NPM1G +22.0620, PGC 66610, UGC 11727

NGC 7053 is a spiral galaxy located about 200 million light-years away in the constellation of Pegasus. It was discovered by astronomer Albert Marth on September 2, 1863. It was then rediscovered by astronomer Heinrich d'Arrest on October 8, 1865.

== Supernovae ==
Two supernovae have been observed in NGC 7053:

- SN 2003ep (Type Ia, mag. 15.7) was discovered by LOTOSS (Lick Observatory and Tenagra Observatory Supernova Searches) on 4 June 2003.
- SN 2022pux (Type II, mag. 17.935) was discovered by the Zwicky Transient Facility on 28 July 2022.

== See also ==
- NGC 7042
