= NGC 7098 =

Galaxy in the constellation Octans

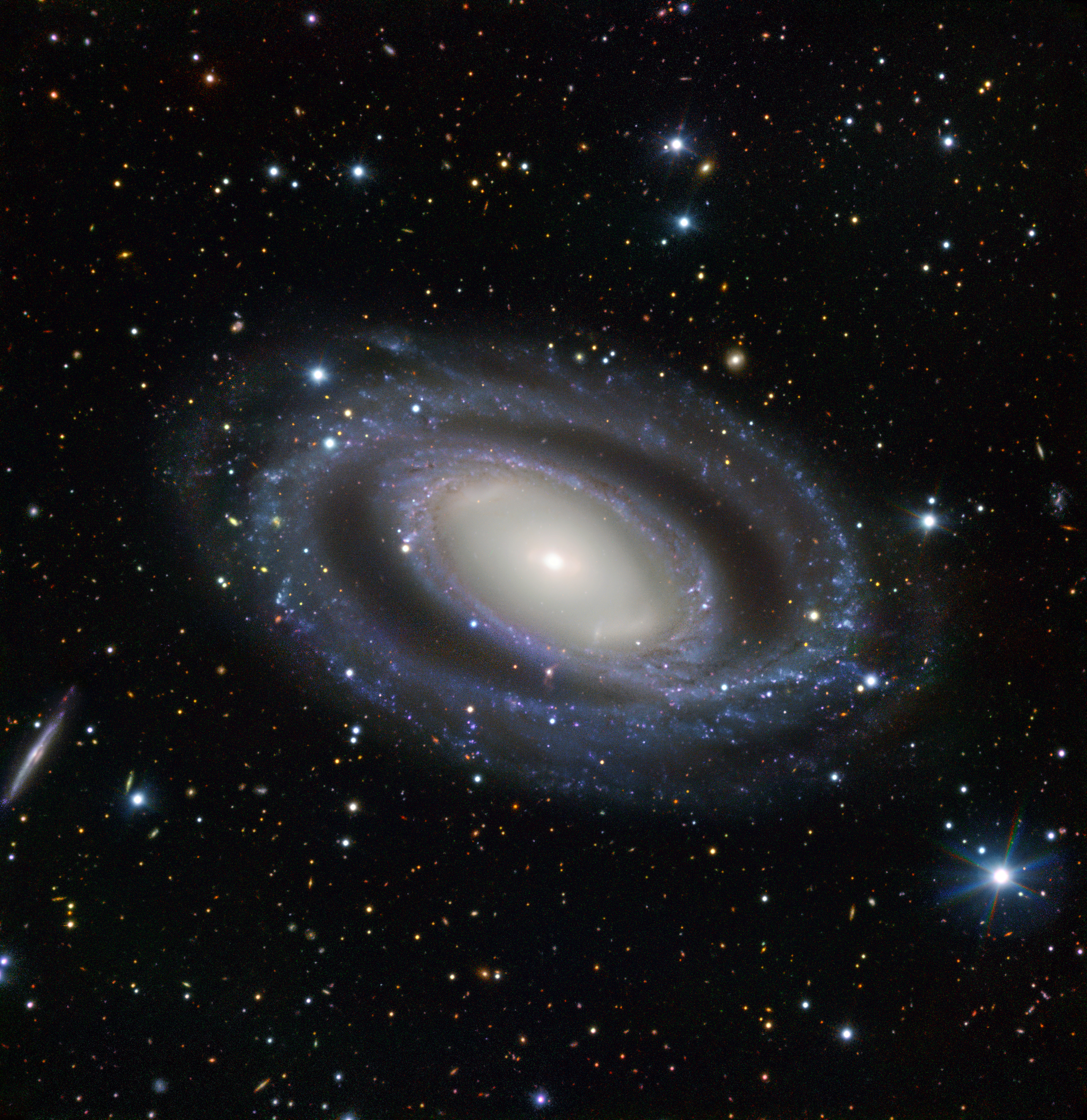
- NGC 7098 by the Very Large Telescope.

Observation data (J2000 epoch)
- Constellation: Octans
- Right ascension: 21^{h} 44^{m} 16.1^{s}
- Declination: −75° 06′ 41″
- Redshift: 0.007942
- Heliocentric radial velocity: 2,381 km/s
- Distance: 95 Mly
- Apparent magnitude (V): 11.3

Characteristics
- Type: (R)SAB(rs)a
- Size: ~152,400.64 ly (estimated)
- Apparent size (V): 4' x 2.6'

Other designations
- ESO 48-5, IRAS 21393-7520, PGC 67266

NGC 7098 is a doubled barred spiral galaxy located about 95 million light-years away from Earth in the constellation of Octans. NGC 7098 has an estimated diameter of 152,400 light-years. NGC 7098 was discovered by astronomer John Herschel on September 22, 1835.

NGC 7098 has a very prominent bar that is shaped like a broad oval with very prominent, nearly straight ansae. Surrounding the bar, an inner ring made of four tightly wrapped spiral arms is found. Located outside of the inner ring, a well-defined outer ring surrounding the inner region appears to have formed due to the wrapping of two spiral arms. It appears that both rings are being affected by new star formation. However, there is no star formation in the core of NGC 7098 as shown by the absence of dust lanes.

== See also ==
- NGC 7013
- NGC 7020
