= NGC 7020 =

Galaxy in the constellation Pavo

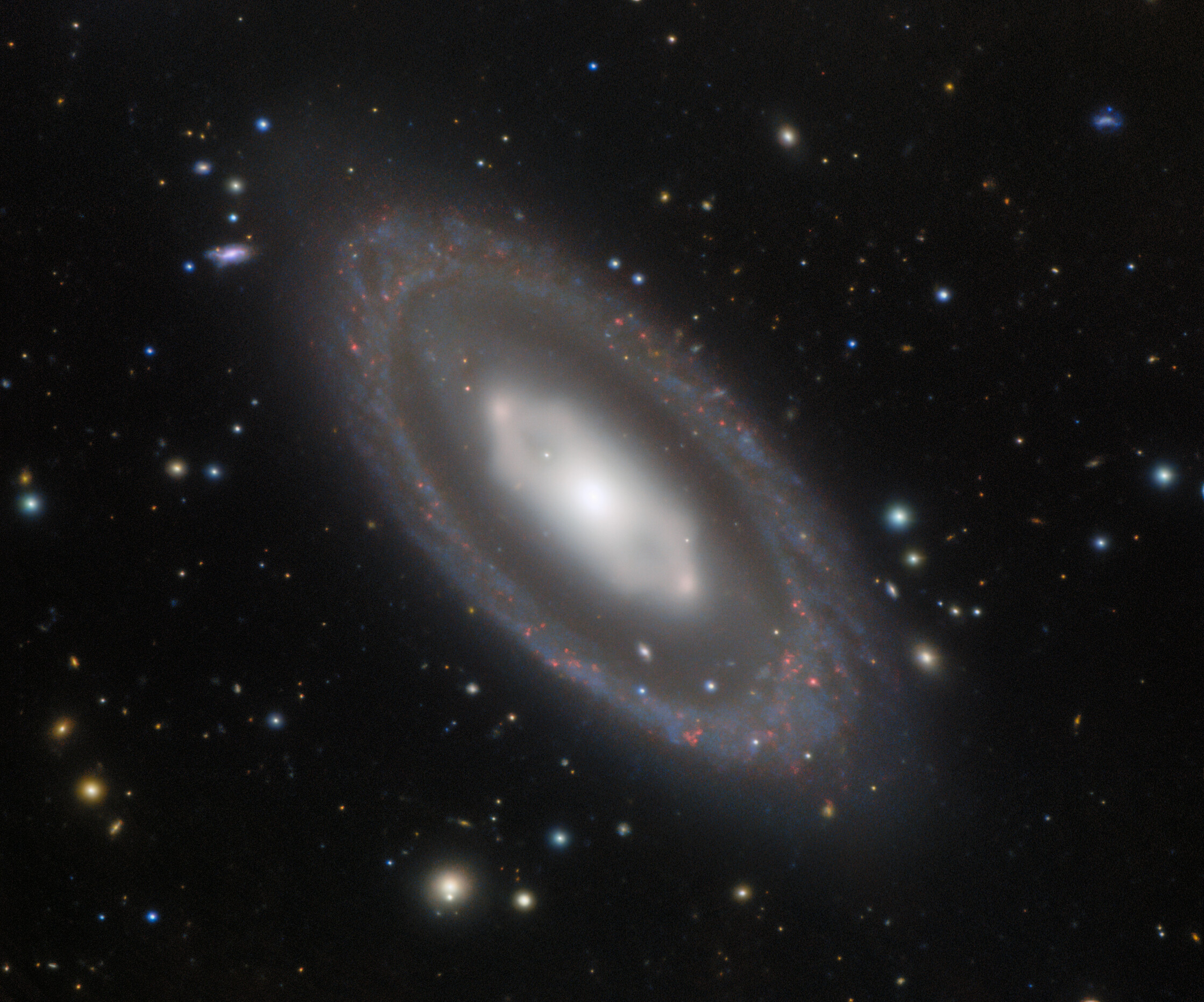
- NGC 7020 imaged by Gemini South Observatory

Observation data (J2000 epoch)
- Constellation: Pavo
- Right ascension: 21^{h} 11^{m} 20.0493^{s}
- Declination: −64° 01′ 30.803″.
- Redshift: 0.010677±0.0000870
- Heliocentric radial velocity: 3,201±26 km/s
- Distance: 95.89 ± 27.40 Mly (29.400 ± 8.400 Mpc)
- Apparent magnitude (V): 12.78

Characteristics
- Type: (R)SA0^+(r)
- Size: ~143,700 ly (44.05 kpc) (estimated)
- Apparent size (V): 3.7′ × 1.8′

Other designations
- ESO 107-13, 2MASX J21112011-6401313, NGC 7021, PGC 66291

NGC 7020 is a barred lenticular galaxy in the constellation Pavo. Its velocity with respect to the cosmic microwave background is 3,102±27 km/s, which corresponds to a Hubble distance of 149.2 ± 10.6 Mly (45.75 ± 3.25 Mpc). However, two non-redshift measurements give a much closer mean distance of 95.89 ± 27.40 Mly (29.400 ± 8.400 Mpc). NGC 7020 was discovered by British astronomer John Herschel on June 22, 1835.

== Physical characteristics ==
NGC 7020 has a large outer ring surrounding a bright inner hexagonal zone containing an inner ring and possibly a bar. The large outer ring is completely detached from the inner hexagonal zone of the galaxy and is dominated by numerous flocculent spiral features. The outer ring has an estimated diameter of 143,700 ly (44.05 kpc). The ring is knotty and bluer than the rest of the galaxy and shows where recent star formation is occurring in NGC 7020. The possible inner ring shows protruding features at the ends of its major axis therefore classifying it as a bar. The galaxy appears to be fairly free of ionized gas, which is not surprising for an early-type galaxy.

== Nearby galaxies ==
NGC 7020 is member of a sparse group of galaxies that contains IC 5084, IC 5092, IC 5096, NGC 6943, NGC 7083, NGC 7096, NGC 7125, NGC 7126 and ESO 107-14. However, NGC 7020 is not interacting with any other galaxy in the group.

== See also ==
- NGC 7098
- NGC 7013
- NGC 4429 galaxy in the Virgo Cluster with a similar structure
- List of NGC objects (7001–7840)
