= NGC 7046 =

Galaxy in the constellation Equuleus

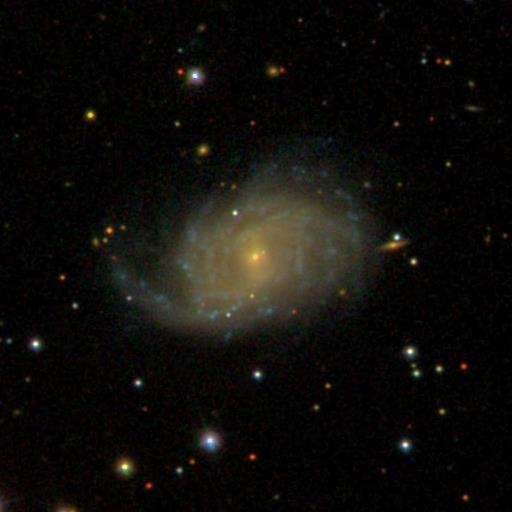
- SDSS image of NGC 7046.

Observation data (J2000 epoch)
- Constellation: Equuleus
- Right ascension: 21^{h} 14^{m} 56.0^{s}
- Declination: +02° 50′ 05″
- Redshift: 0.013873
- Heliocentric radial velocity: 4130±7 km/s
- Distance: 193 Mly
- Apparent magnitude (V): 13.75
- Apparent magnitude (B): 14.2

Characteristics
- Type: SBc, LINER
- Size: ~192,639 light-years (59,063 parsecs)
- Apparent size (V): 0.990 x 0.653

Other designations
- CGCG 375-20, IRAS 21123+0237, MCG 0-54-9, PGC 66407, UGC 11708

NGC 7046 is a barred spiral galaxy located 193 million light-years away in the constellation of Equuleus. With a high radial velocity of 4,130 km/s, the galaxy is drifting away from the Milky Way. NGC 7046 has an apparent size of 0.990 arcmin, and at its current distance, it has an estimate diameter of 192,639 light years. NGC 7046 has a morphological type of "SBc", which indicates that it is a barred spiral galaxy with a definite bulge.

As of 2021, there have been no observed supernovae in the galaxy, but it has been discovered to be in a small galaxy group.
