= HD 202951 =

Star in the constellation Equuleus

- Location of HD 202951 (circled)

Observation data Epoch J2000 Equinox ICRS
- Constellation: Equuleus
- Right ascension: 21^{h} 18^{m} 52.02694^{s}
- Declination: +11° 12′ 12.1708″
- Apparent magnitude (V): 5.97

Characteristics
- Evolutionary stage: red giant branch
- Spectral type: K5 III
- B−V color index: 1.648

Astrometry
Radial velocity (R_{v})	−37.3±2.5 km/s
Proper motion (μ)	RA: +21.643 mas/yr Dec.: +15.723 mas/yr
Parallax (π)	3.3390±0.1317 mas
Distance	980 ± 40 ly (300 ± 10 pc)
Absolute magnitude (M_{V})	−1.97

Orbit
Period (P)	999.8±2.4 d
Eccentricity (e)	0.229±0.018
Periastron epoch (T)	53771±12 MJD
Argument of periastron (ω) (secondary)	3±5°
Semi-amplitude (K_{1}) (primary)	4.09±0.08 km/s

Details
Mass	1.15 M_{☉}
Radius	85 R_{☉}
Luminosity	2,202 L_{☉}
Surface gravity (log g)	1.29 cgs
Temperature	3,805 K
Metallicity [Fe/H]	−0.26 dex
Rotational velocity (v sin i)	4.4 km/s
Age	10.7 Gyr

Other designations
- NSV 25543, BD+10°4516, FK5 3700, HD 202951, HIP 105224, HR 8149, SAO 107020

Database references
SIMBAD	data

HD 202951 is a probable binary star system located in the northern constellation of Equuleus. It is near the lower limit of visibility to the naked eye, having an apparent visual magnitude of 5.97. The distance to this system can be estimated from the annual parallax shift of 3.34 mas, yielding a value of roughly 980 light years. It is moving closer with a heliocentric radial velocity of −37 km/s.

Griffin (2012) found this to be a single-lined spectroscopic binary system with an orbital period of 2.7373 ± 0.0066 yr and an eccentricity of 0.23. The a sin i value for the primary component is 54.8 ± 1.1 Gm (0.366 ± 0.007 AU), where a is the semimajor axis and i is the (unknown) orbital inclination. This value provides a lower bound for the actual semimajor axis.

The visible component is an evolved K-type giant star with a stellar classification of K5 III. It is a candidate variable star of unknown type, showing an amplitude variation of 0.0115 magnitude with a frequency of 0.47645 times per day, or one cycle per 2.1 days. X-ray emission has been detected from this system.
