= NGC 7025 =

Spiral galaxy in the constellation Delphinus

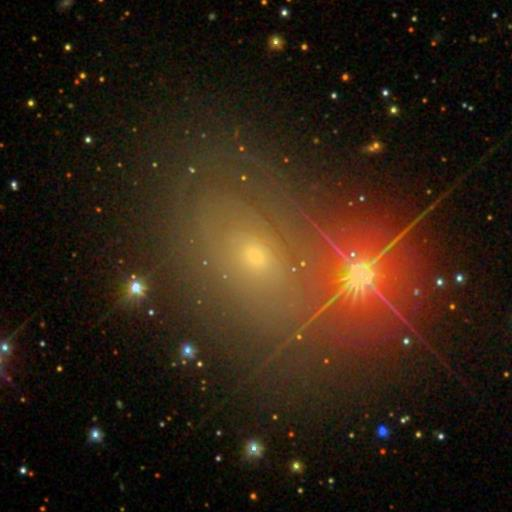
- SDSS image of NGC 7025.

Observation data (J2000 epoch)
- Constellation: Delphinus
- Right ascension: 21^{h} 07^{m} 47.3^{s}
- Declination: 16° 20′ 09″
- Redshift: 0.016571
- Heliocentric radial velocity: 4,968 km/s
- Distance: 207.1 Mly
- Apparent magnitude (V): 13.71

Characteristics
- Type: Sa, LINER
- Size: ~ 161,827.82 ly
- Apparent size (V): 1.9 x 1.3

Other designations
- CGCG 449-3, IRAS 21054+1607, KARA 897, MCG 3-54-1, PGC 66151, UGC 11681

NGC 7025 is a spiral galaxy located about 210 million light-years away from Earth in the constellation Delphinus. NGC 7025 is also classified as a LINER galaxy. The galaxy has an estimated diameter of 161,830 light-years. It was discovered by astronomer Albert Marth on September 17, 1863.

== Gallery ==
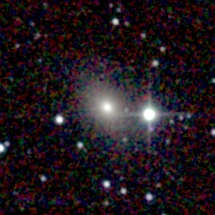
NGC 7025 as imaged by 2MASS

== See also ==
- List of NGC objects (7001–7840)
- NGC 7013
- NGC 7001
- NGC 4593
