= NGC 7096 =

Spiral galaxy in the constellation Indus

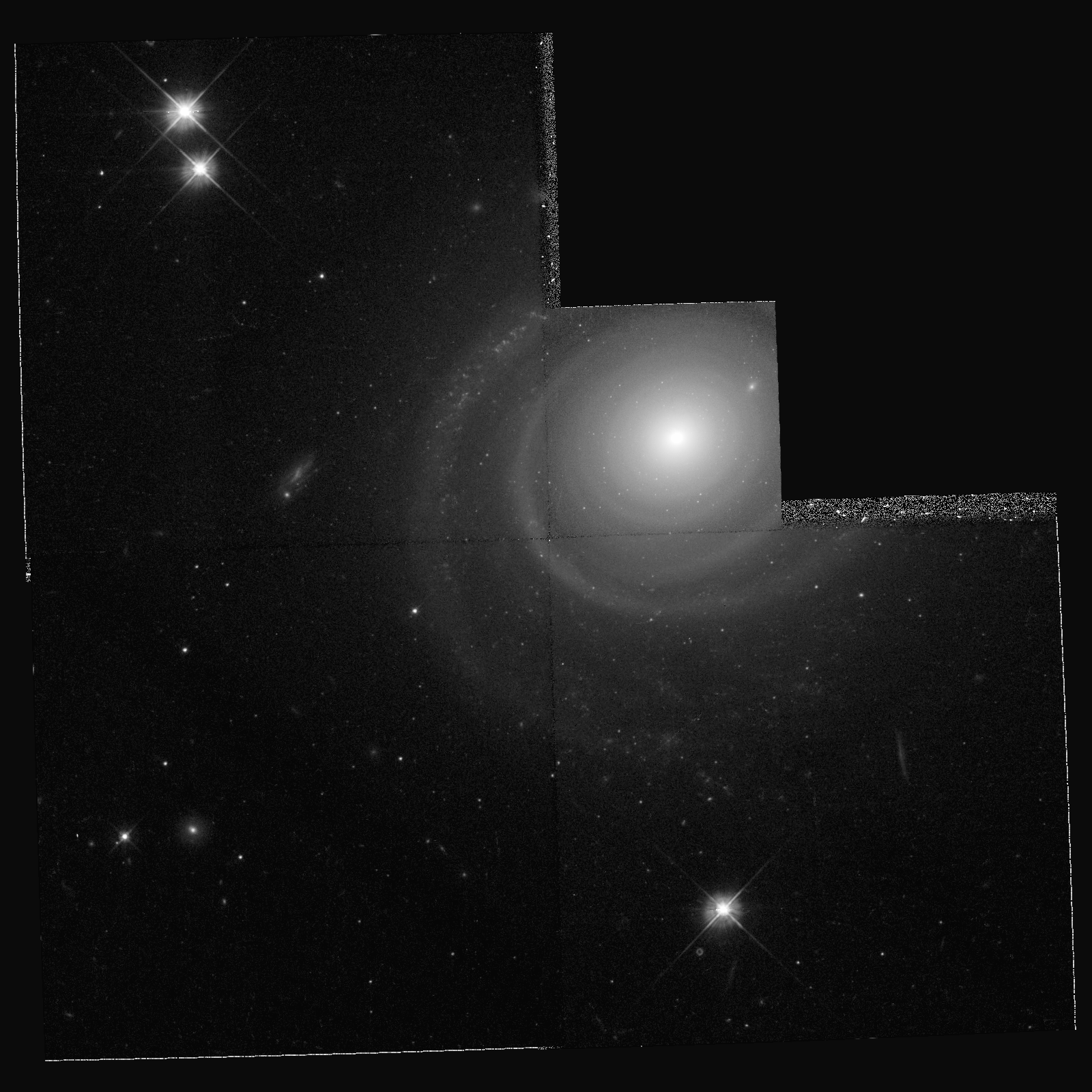
- The spiral galaxy NGC 7096.

Observation data (J2000 epoch)
- Constellation: Indus
- Right ascension: 21^{h} 41^{m} 19.3^{s}
- Declination: −63° 54′ 31″
- Redshift: 0.010340
- Heliocentric radial velocity: 3,100 km/s
- Distance: 133.4 Mly
- Apparent magnitude (V): 12.82

Characteristics
- Type: SA(s)a
- Apparent size (V): 1.9' x 1.6'

Other designations
- ESO 107-46, AM 2137-640, IRAS 21373-6408, IC 5121, PGC 67168

NGC 7096 is a grand-design spiral galaxy located about 130 million light-years away in the constellation of Indus. NGC 7096 is also part of a group of galaxies that contains the galaxy NGC 7083. NGC 7096 was discovered by astronomer John Herschel on August 31, 1836.

== See also ==
- NGC 7001
