= NGC 4429 =

Galaxy in the constellation Virgo

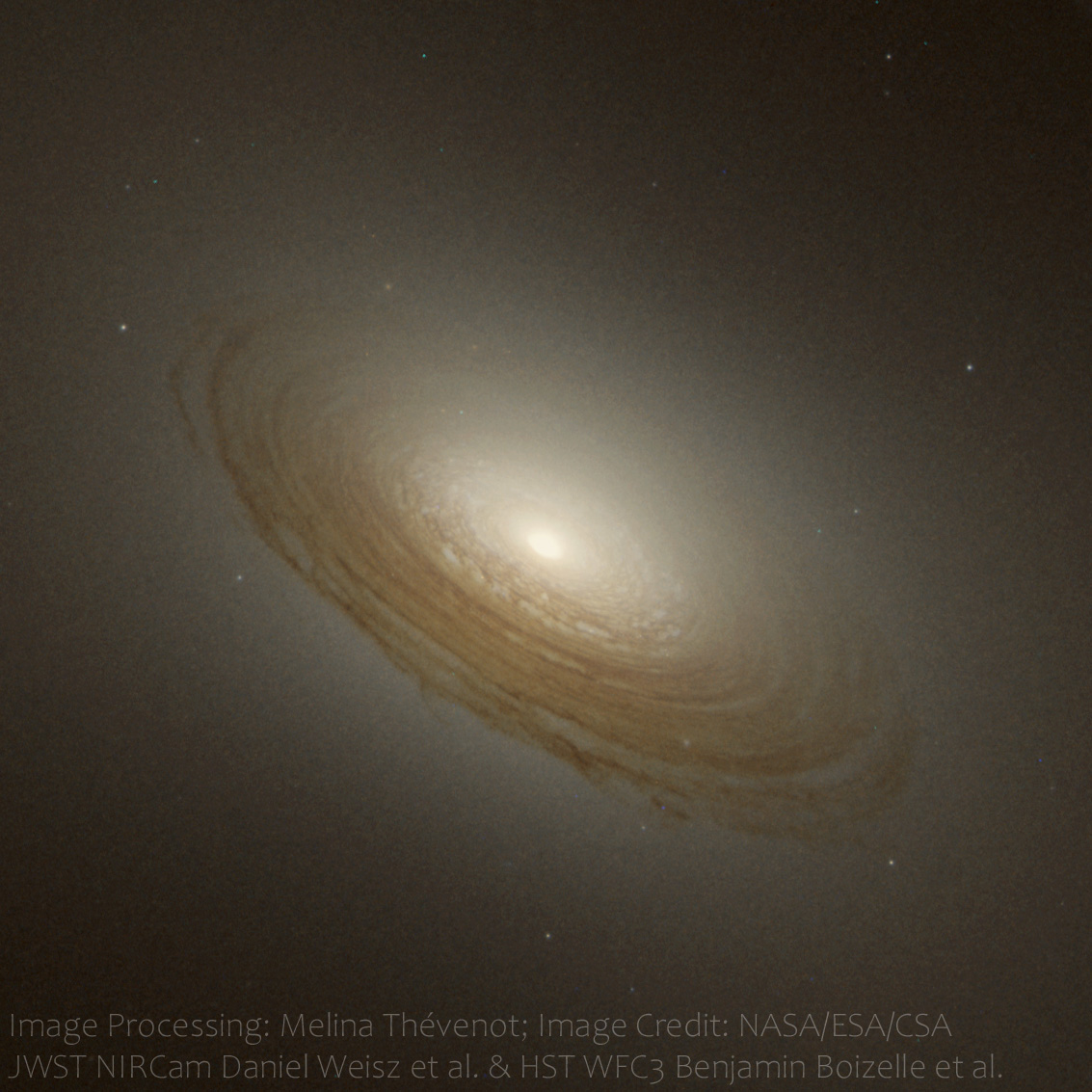
- NGC 4429 imaged by Hubble and James Webb showing its compact nuclear ring

Observation data (J2000 epoch)
- Constellation: Virgo
- Right ascension: 12^{h} 27^{m} 26.5^{s}
- Declination: 11° 06′ 28″
- Redshift: 0.003683
- Heliocentric radial velocity: 1,104 km/s
- Distance: 55.42 Mly (16.99 Mpc)
- Group or cluster: Virgo Cluster
- Apparent magnitude (V): 10.2

Characteristics
- Type: SA0^+(r)
- Size: ~82,854.8 ly (estimated)
- Apparent size (V): 5.8′ × 2.8′

Other designations
- NGC 4429, UGC 7568, PGC 40850

NGC 4429 is a lenticular galaxy located about 55 million light-years away in the constellation of Virgo. NGC 4429 is tilted at an inclination of about 75° which means that the galaxy is tilted almost edge-on as seen from Earth. NGC 4429 was discovered by astronomer William Herschel on March 15, 1784. The galaxy is a member of the Virgo Cluster.

== Physical characteristics ==
NGC 4429 has a small dust disk. There is also possibly a cold circumnuclear stellar disk. The cold circumnuclear stellar disk may have formed due to the infall of gas to center caused by a merger. However, since NGC 4429 does not show any signs of a recent gravitational disturbance, the merger must have happened a long time ago in the past.

The dust disk and the cold circumnuclear stellar disk are embedded in a bright, hexagonal shaped bulge that resembles that of NGC 7020. The zone has bright arcs near its major axis but no "spots" or extensions as in NGC 7020. The zone is also somewhat ring-like.

=== Interstellar medium ===
NGC 4429 may lose a significant fraction of its gas due to ram pressure stripping.

=== Metallicity ===
The central regions of NGC 4429 are overabundant in the element magnesium.

== See also ==
- List of NGC objects (4001–5000)
- NGC 7020 - similar looking galaxy
- NGC 7013
