= WASP-90 =

Star in the constellation Equuleus

Observation data Epoch J2000 Equinox J2000
- Constellation: Equuleus
- Right ascension: 21^{h} 02^{m} 07.6772^{s}
- Declination: +07° 03′ 22.518″
- Apparent magnitude (V): 11.63

Characteristics
- Evolutionary stage: subgiant
- Spectral type: F6

Astrometry
Proper motion (μ)	RA: −9.080(31) mas/yr Dec.: 5.645(23) mas/yr
Parallax (π)	2.0870±0.0334 mas
Distance	1,560 ± 30 ly (479 ± 8 pc)

Details
Mass	1.55±0.10 M_{☉}
Radius	1.98±0.09 R_{☉}
Luminosity	4.3±0.2 L_{☉}
Surface gravity (log g)	4.03±0.03 cgs
Temperature	6228+125 −133 K
Metallicity [Fe/H]	0.11±0.14 dex
Rotational velocity (v sin i)	6.0±0.5 km/s
Age	4.40+8.40 −2.40 Gyr

Other designations
- Gaia DR2 1737061349198867456

Database references
SIMBAD	data

WASP-90 is a faint 11th magnitude star located in the northern constellation Equuleus. With an apparent magnitude of 11.63, it is too faint to be detected with the naked eye, but can be seen with a telescope, and is located 1,560 ly (480 pc) from the Solar System.

== Properties ==
WASP-90 has a classification of F6. The exoplanet discovery paper describes it as having expanded to a "post-MS" radius, about twice that of the Sun. WASP-90 is 55% more massive than the Sun, and radiates at 4.3 times the Sun's luminosity from its photosphere at an effective temperature of 6,430 K. Despite it being a similar age to the Sun, the star has a high metallicity that is 28% greater than that of the Sun.

== Planetary system ==
In 2016, a bloated "hot Jupiter" was discovered orbiting the star. Due to the host's state, the planet is extremely irradiated.

The WASP-90 planetary system
Companion (in order from star)	Mass	Semimajor axis (AU)	Orbital period (days)	Eccentricity	Inclination	Radius
b	0.63±0.07 M_{J}	0.06±0.00	3.92±0.00	0.00	82.1±0.4°	1.63±0.09 R_{J}
