= NGC 7040 =

Galaxy in the constellation Equuleus

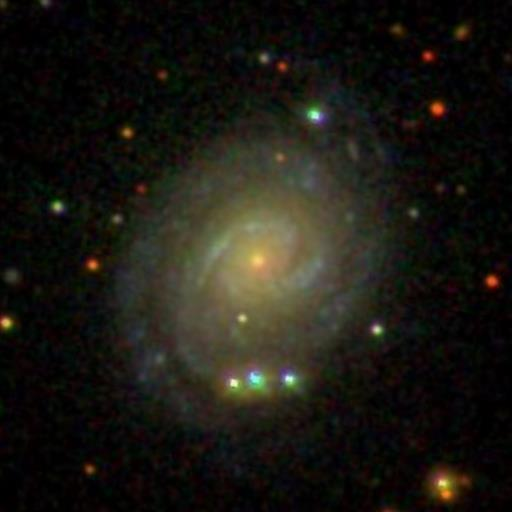
- SDSS image of NGC 7040.

Observation data (J2000 epoch)
- Constellation: Equuleus
- Right ascension: 21^{h} 13^{m} 16.5^{s}
- Declination: 08° 51′ 54″
- Redshift: 0.020399
- Heliocentric radial velocity: 6,115 km/s
- Distance: 257.5 Mly
- Apparent magnitude (V): 14.9

Characteristics
- Type: S?
- Size: ~42,601.72 ly (estimated)
- Apparent size (V): 1.1 x 0.8

Other designations
- CGCG 401-8, IRAS 21108+0839, MCG 1-54-4, PGC 66366, UGC 11701

NGC 7040 is a spiral galaxy located about 260 million light-years away in the constellation of Equuleus. It has an estimated diameter of 42,600 light-years. NGC 7040 was discovered by astronomer Mark Harrington on August 18, 1882.

== See also ==
- NGC 7001 – a face-on intermediate spiral galaxy
- List of NGC objects (7001–7840)
