= 4 Equulei =

Star in the constellation Equuleus

Observation data Epoch J2000.0 Equinox ICRS
- Constellation: Equuleus
- Right ascension: 21^{h} 05^{m} 26.71378^{s}
- Declination: +05° 57′ 29.5655″
- Apparent magnitude (V): 5.94

Characteristics
- Spectral type: F8 V + ?
- U−B color index: 0.20
- B−V color index: 0.538

Astrometry
Radial velocity (R_{v})	−12.7±0.3 km/s
Proper motion (μ)	RA: −128.69 mas/yr Dec.: −113.60 mas/yr
Parallax (π)	20.44±1.68 mas
Distance	160 ± 10 ly (49 ± 4 pc)
Absolute magnitude (M_{V})	2.52

Orbit
Period (P)	1975.76±0.94 d
Eccentricity (e)	0.3937±0.0047
Periastron epoch (T)	51004.2 ± 4.2 HJD
Argument of periastron (ω) (secondary)	14.22±0.83°
Semi-amplitude (K_{1}) (primary)	10.585±0.061 km/s

Details
Mass	1.39+0.09 −0.03 M_{☉}
Radius	approx 1.2 R_{☉}
Luminosity	4.98 L_{☉}
Surface gravity (log g)	3.80±0.06 cgs
Temperature	6213±63 K
Metallicity [Fe/H]	−0.18±0.05 dex
Rotational velocity (v sin i)	6.2±1.0 km/s
Age	3.07+0.35 −0.44 Gyr

Other designations
- 4 Equ, BD+05°4697, HD 200790, HIP 104101, HR 8077, SAO 126535, WDS J21054+0557A

Database references
SIMBAD	data

4 Equulei is a binary star system in the constellation of Equuleus, located about 3° to the east of Alpha Equulei. With an apparent visual magnitude of 5.94, it is just barely visible to the naked eye under good seeing conditions. The system shows an annual parallax shift of 20.44 mas as measured from Earth's orbit, which yields a distance estimate of about 160 light years. It is moving closer to the Sun with a radial velocity of −13 km/s.

This is a single-lined spectroscopic binary with an orbital period of 5.4093 ± 0.0026 years (1,975.76 ± 0.94 d) and an eccentricity of 0.39. The value of a sin i for the primary is (264.4±1.6)×10^{6} km, providing a lower bound for the semimajor axis. Griffin (2011) noted that the mass of the secondary component is likely to be at least equal to that of the Sun, which, for an ordinary main sequence star, should make it visible in the spectrum. The lack of significant ultraviolet emission appears to rule out a white dwarf companion. Instead, the secondary may consist of a binary pair of low mass dwarfs.

The visible component is an F-type main-sequence star with a stellar classification of F8 V. The spectrum of the star is unusual for its near absence of lithium. With an estimated age of about three billion years, it has 1.4 times the mass of the Sun and is spinning with a projected rotational velocity of 6 km/s. It is radiating five times the Sun's luminosity from its photosphere at an effective temperature of around 6,213 K. 4 Equulei is not known to harbor a planet. It has a magnitude 12.4 companion star located, as of 2012, at an angular separation of 30.70 arcseconds along a position angle of 301°.
