= MASCARA-1b =

Exoplanet in Equuleus

Discovery
- Discovered by: MASCARA
- Discovery date: 17 July 2017

Orbital characteristics
- Semi-major axis: 0.040352 AU
- Orbital period (sidereal): 2.1 d
- Star: MASCARA-1

Physical characteristics
- Mean radius: 1.597 R_{J}
- Mass: 3.7 M_{J}
- Temperature: 3062 K

MASCARA-1b is a superjovian exoplanet, orbiting the A-type star MASCARA-1 (HD 201585).

== Characteristics ==
MASCARA-1b is a hot Jupiter transiting its parent A-type star; its orbit is misaligned with the star's rotation. The planet was found unusually reflective for hot Jupiter with the measured geometric albedo of 0.171^{+0.066}_{−0.068} and dayside temperature of 3062^{+66}_{−68} K. Attempts to spectroscopically characterize its composition were failing as in 2022 due to relatively high planetary surface gravity resulting in compact atmosphere.
