= HD 203473 =

High proper motion star in the constellation Equuleus

Observation data Epoch J2000 Equinox J2000.0 (ICRS)
- Constellation: Equuleus
- Right ascension: 21^{h} 22^{m} 18.87390^{s}
- Declination: +05° 01′ 24.9072″
- Apparent magnitude (V): 8.23

Characteristics
- Evolutionary stage: subgiant
- Spectral type: G6 V
- B−V color index: +0.66

Astrometry
Radial velocity (R_{v})	−61.70±0.13 km/s
Proper motion (μ)	RA: 180.093±0.035 mas/yr Dec.: 0.098±0.031 mas/yr
Parallax (π)	13.7402±0.0370 mas
Distance	237.4 ± 0.6 ly (72.8 ± 0.2 pc)
Absolute magnitude (M_{V})	+4.2

Details
Mass	1.12 M_{☉}
Radius	1.52 R_{☉}
Luminosity	2.31 L_{☉}
Surface gravity (log g)	4.11 cgs
Temperature	5,780 K
Metallicity [Fe/H]	+0.19 dex
Rotation	28 days
Rotational velocity (v sin i)	1.27 km/s
Age	6.0 Gyr

Other designations
- AG+04°2898, BD+04°4656, HD 203473, HIP 105521, SAO 126740, GSC 00536-00696

Database references
SIMBAD	data
Exoplanet Archive	data

HD 203473 is a star in the equatorial constellation Equuleus. With an apparent magnitude of 8.23, it’s only visible by using an amateur telescope. The star is located at a distance of 237 light years based on its parallax shift but is drifting closer at a high rate of 61.7 km/s. As of 2014, no stellar companions have been detected around the star.

HD 203473 is an ordinary G-type main-sequence star with 112% the mass of the Sun, but is 52% larger than the latter. This star is over luminous and hot for its reported spectral class, with it radiating at 2.3 times the luminosity of the Sun and an effective temperature of 5,780 K. HD 203473 is about six billion years old. Like many planetary hosts, HD 203473 has an enhanced metallicity, with an iron abundance 1.55 times that of the Sun.

== Companion ==
In 2018, the N2K project discovered an object, initially thought to be a planet, orbiting the star via Doppler spectroscopy. Due to the detection method, its inclination and true mass were initially unknown. In 2022, the inclination and true mass of this companion were measured via astrometry, revealing it to be 96 M_{J} and thus either a massive brown dwarf or low-mass star. The companion's orbital period was also found to be twice as long as originally thought.

The HD 203473 planetary system
Companion (in order from star)	Mass	Semimajor axis (AU)	Orbital period (years)	Eccentricity	Inclination (°)	Radius
b	95.886+8.523 −8.864 M_{J}	4.161+0.172 −0.190	8.103+0.014 −0.016	0.404±0.007	141.240+0.949 −0.909	—
