= SY Equulei =

High galactic latitude β Cephei variable

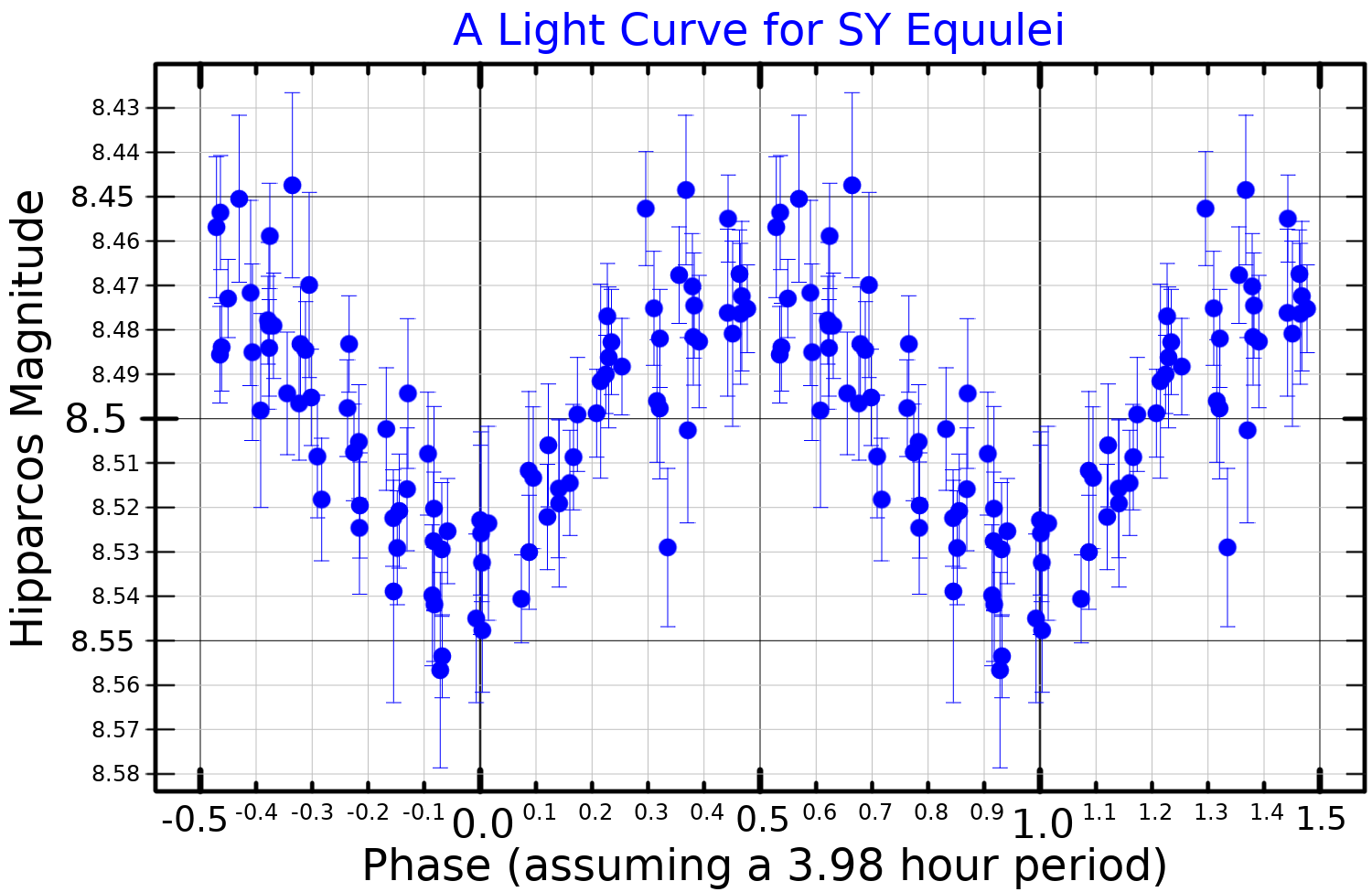
- A light curve for SY Equulei, plotted from Hipparcos data

Observation data Epoch J2000.0 Equinox J2000.0 (ICRS)
- Constellation: Equuleus
- Right ascension: 21^{h} 23^{m} 28.8086^{s}
- Declination: +09° 55′ 54.9204″
- Apparent magnitude (V): 8.52 - 8.58

Characteristics
- Spectral type: B0.5 IIIn
- U−B color index: −1.00
- B−V color index: −0.20
- Variable type: β Cephei

Astrometry
| Radial velocity (R_{v}) | 48±5.5 km/s |
| Proper motion (μ) | RA: −0.185 mas/yr Dec.: −9.049 mas/yr |
| Parallax (π) | 0.3869±0.0558 mas |
| Distance | approx. 8,000 ly (approx. 2,600 pc) |
| Absolute bolometric magnitude (M_{bol}) | −6.04 |

Details
| Mass | 14 M_{☉} |
| Radius | 10.44 R_{☉} |
| Luminosity | 2,490 L_{☉} |
| Surface gravity (log g) | 3.8±0.2 cgs |
| Temperature | 28,184^{+1,328}_{−1,268} K |
| Metallicity [Fe/H] | 0.00 dex |
| Rotational velocity (v sin i) | 180 km/s |
| Age | ~7.5 Myr |

Other designations
- SY Equueli, AG+09°2978, BD+09°4793, HD 203664, HIP 105614, SAO 126757

Database references
| SIMBAD | data |

SY Equulei, also known as HD 203664, is a single variable star located in the equatorial constellation Equuleus. It has an average apparent magnitude of about 8.5, varying by a few hundredths of a magnitude, making it readily visible in binoculars and small telescopes, but not to the naked eye. The star is relatively far away at a distance of 8,000 light years and is receding with a heliocentric radial velocity of 48 km/s. At that distance, SY Equulei is dimmed by 0.19 magnitudes due to interstellar dust.

Throughout the late 20th century, HD 203664 was known to have a dust cloud surrounding it. Subsequent observations from Kenneth R. Sembach (1995) reveal it to contain high abundances of calcium as well as traces of magnesium, aluminum, and silicon. The cloud probably came from outside the galactic plane and is moving towards the star at a rate of 70 km/s. The star has a high galactic latitude, indicating its location in the galactic halo. HD 203664 was most likely ejected from its birthplace to its current distance. However, its status as a Beta Cephei variable wasn't discovered until a survey of 2000 using Hipparcos data. It was then given the designation SY Equulei.

SY Equulei has a stellar classification of B0.5 IIIn, indicating an evolved B-type star with nebulous (broad) absorption lines due to rapid rotation. Unlike most stars of its type, it spins rapidly with a projected rotational velocity of 180 km/s, which is 40% of its break-up velocity. It has 14 times the mass of the Sun and a radius of 10.4 radius. It radiates at 2,490 times the luminosity of the Sun from its photosphere at an effective temperature of 28,184 K, giving a whitish blue hue.

SY Equueli is a variable star with an amplitude of 0.07 magnitudes and an average period of 3.98 hours. In later observations, SY Equulei was found to have multiple periods.
