= 9 Equulei =

Star in the constellation Equuleus

Observation data Epoch J2000 Equinox J2000
- Constellation: Equuleus
- Right ascension: 21^{h} 21^{m} 04.825^{s}
- Declination: +07° 21′ 16.21″
- Apparent magnitude (V): 5.798

Characteristics
- Evolutionary stage: AGB
- Spectral type: M2IIIa
- U−B color index: +1.97
- B−V color index: +1.66
- Variable type: suspected

Astrometry
Radial velocity (R_{v})	−21.82±0.30 km/s
Proper motion (μ)	RA: 43.871±0.274 mas/yr Dec.: −17.822±0.261 mas/yr
Parallax (π)	4.3895±0.1647 mas
Distance	740 ± 30 ly (228 ± 9 pc)
Absolute magnitude (M_{V})	−0.69

Details
Mass	1.2 M_{☉}
Radius	58 R_{☉}
Luminosity	720 L_{☉}
Surface gravity (log g)	1.64 cgs
Temperature	3,920 K
Metallicity [Fe/H]	−0.27 dex

Other designations
- HIP 105413, HD 203291, HR 8163, SAO 126719

Database references
SIMBAD	data

9 Equulei is an M-type star in the constellation Equuleus. It is an asymptotic giant branch (AGB) star, a star that has exhausted its core helium and is now fusing both hydrogen and helium in shells outside the core. It is also a suspected variable star with an amplitude of about 0.05 magnitudes.

The spectral type is M2IIIa, meaning it is a relatively cool giant star. As an AGB star, it is burning hydrogen and helium in shells around an inert carbon-oxygen core. It has expanded to 58 times the radius of the Sun, and it radiates 720 times as much electromagnetic radiation from a photosphere with an effective temperature of 3,920 K.

This star has been designated Eta Equulei by Johann Elert Bode, but the designation is generally unused now.
