= R Equulei =

Variable star in the constellation of Equuleus

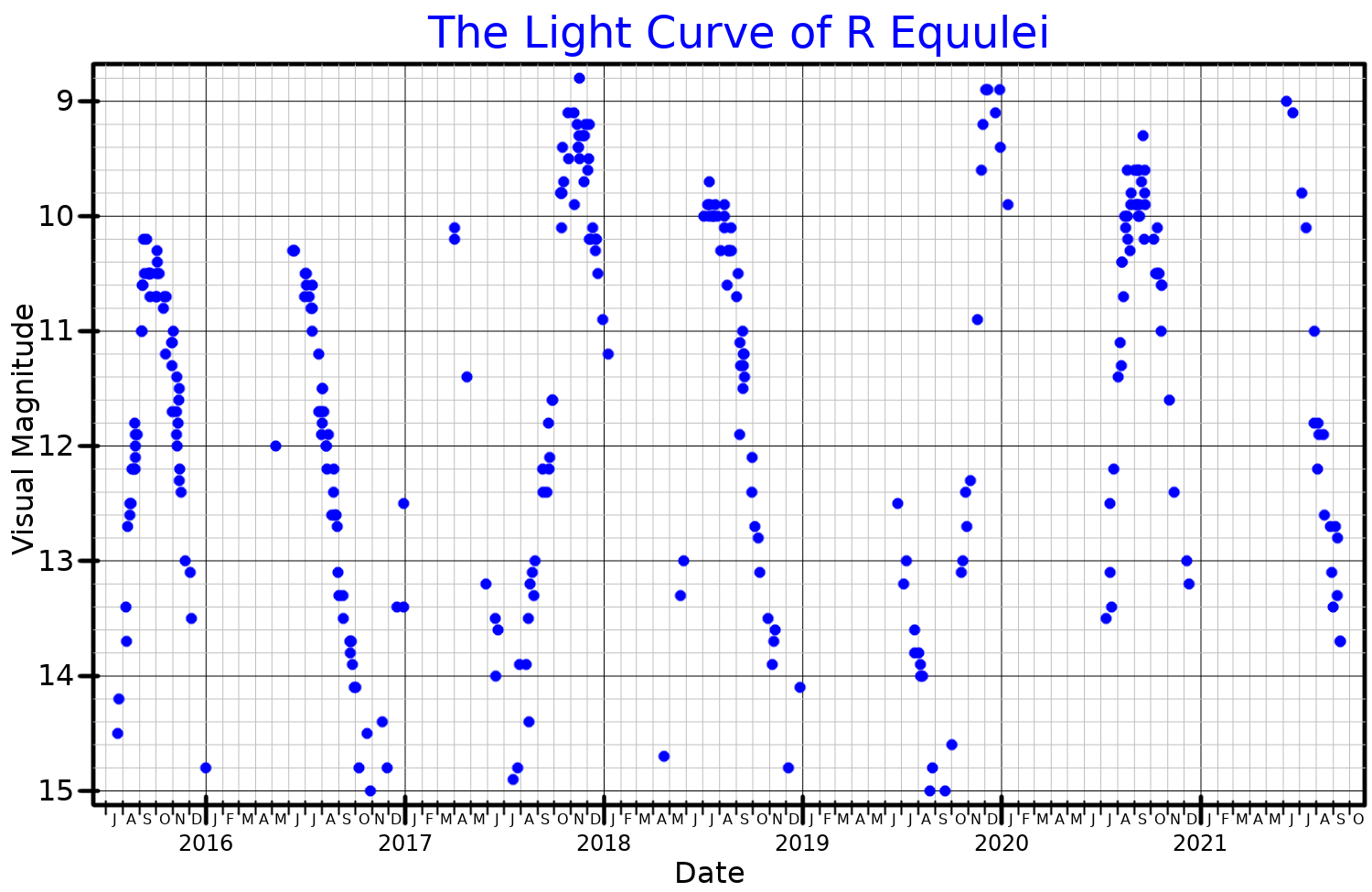
- The visual band light curve of R Equulei, from AAVSO data

Observation data Epoch J2000 Equinox J2000
- Constellation: Equuleus
- Right ascension: 21^{h} 13^{m} 11.49118^{s}
- Declination: +12° 48′ 06.1620″
- Apparent magnitude (V): 8.7 - 15.0

Characteristics
- Spectral type: M3e - M4e
- B−V color index: +1.41
- Variable type: Mira

Astrometry
Radial velocity (R_{v})	−54±5 km/s
Proper motion (μ)	RA: −2.713 mas/yr Dec.: −11.232 mas/yr
Parallax (π)	0.4329±0.0437 mas
Distance	approx. 7,500 ly (approx. 2,300 pc)

Details
Mass	3.42 M_{☉}
Luminosity	33,791 L_{☉}
Surface gravity (log g)	−0.007 cgs
Temperature	3,395 K
Metallicity [Fe/H]	−0.13 dex

Other designations
- R Equ, BD+12°4573a, HD 202051, PPM 139768

Database references
SIMBAD	data

R Equulei is a class M Mira variable star in the constellation Equuleus. Its brightness varies between a minimum magnitude of 15.0 to a maximum of 8.7 with an average period of 261 days.
