= Beta Equulei =

Star in the constellation Equuleus

- Location of β Equulei (circled in red)

Observation data Epoch J2000.0 Equinox J2000.0 (ICRS)
- Constellation: Equuleus
- Right ascension: 21^{h} 22^{m} 53.61365^{s}
- Declination: +06° 48′ 40.1125″
- Apparent magnitude (V): 5.16

Characteristics
- Evolutionary stage: Main sequence
- Spectral type: A3 V
- U−B color index: +0.10
- B−V color index: +0.064±0.003

Astrometry
Radial velocity (R_{v})	−11.1±0.8 km/s
Proper motion (μ)	RA: +53.685 mas/yr Dec.: +10.136 mas/yr
Parallax (π)	11.2696±0.2608 mas
Distance	289 ± 7 ly (89 ± 2 pc)
Absolute magnitude (M_{V})	+0.13

Details
Mass	2.74±0.04 M_{☉}
Radius	4.02 R_{☉}
Luminosity	78.3 L_{☉}
Temperature	9,000 K
Rotational velocity (v sin i)	58.0±0.7 km/s
Age	600 Myr

Other designations
- β Equ, 10 Equulei, BD+06°4811, HD 203562, HIP 105570, HR 8178, SAO 126749, WDS 21229+0649A

Database references
SIMBAD	data

Beta Equulei, Latinized from β Equulei, is a solitary star in the northern constellation of Equuleus. It is faintly visible to the naked eye with an apparent visual magnitude of 5.16. The annual parallax shift is 11.27 mas, indicating a separation of around 289 light years from the Sun. It is drifting closer with a radial velocity of −11 km/s.

This is an ordinary A-type main sequence star with a stellar classification of A3 V. It has 2.7 times the mass of the Sun and about four times the Sun's radius. The star is around 600 million years old – 93% of the way through its main sequence lifetime – and is spinning with a projected rotational velocity of 58 km/s. It is radiating 78 times the luminosity of the Sun from its photosphere at an effective temperature of about 9,000 K. The star emits an infrared excess indicating the presence of a dusty debris disk. The mean temperature of the dust is 85 K, indicating the semimajor axis of its orbit is 104 AU.

β Equulei has four optical companions. They are not physically associated with the star described above.
