= NGC 7043 =

Galaxy in the constellation Pegasus

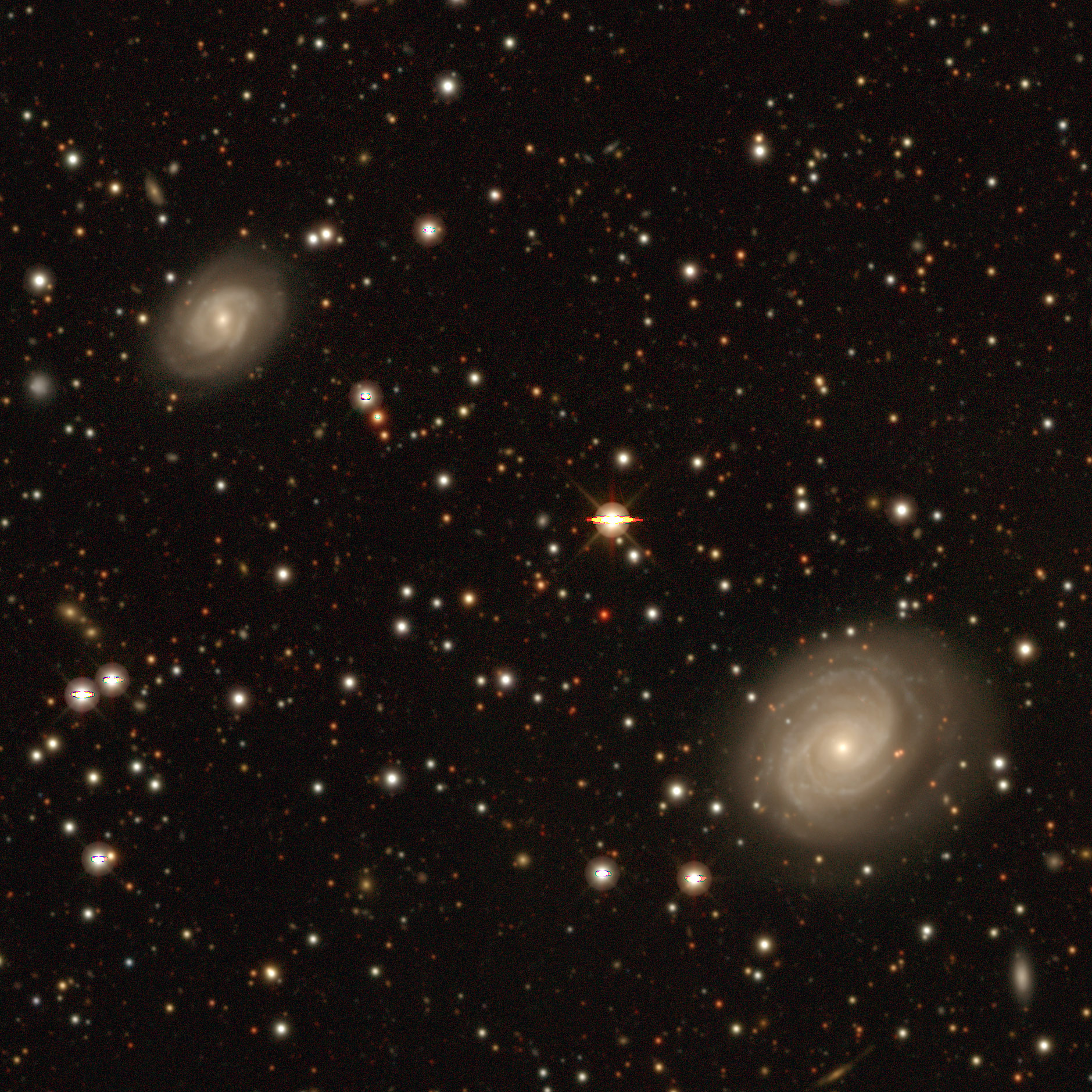
- The barred spiral galaxy NGC 7043 (upper left) and NGC 7042 (lower right).

Observation data (J2000 epoch)
- Constellation: Pegasus
- Right ascension: 21^{h} 14^{m} 04.2^{s}
- Declination: 13° 37′ 34″
- Redshift: 0.016451
- Heliocentric radial velocity: 4,932 km/s
- Distance: 2,051 Mly
- Apparent magnitude (V): 14.57

Characteristics
- Type: SBa
- Size: ~73,101.42 ly (estimated)
- Apparent size (V): 1.0 x 0.9

Other designations
- CGCG 426-24, KCPG 555B, MCG 2-54-14, PGC 66385, UGC 11704

NGC 7043 is a barred spiral galaxy located about 200 million light-years away in the constellation of Pegasus. NGC 7043 is part of a pair of galaxies that contains the galaxy NGC 7042. It has an estimated diameter of 73,100 light-years. NGC 7043 was discovered by astronomer Albert Marth on August 18, 1863.

== See also ==
- List of NGC objects (7001–7840)
