= 6 Equulei =

Star in the constellation Equuleus

- 6 Equulei is very close to γ Equulei in the sky

Observation data Epoch J2000.0 Equinox ICRS
- Constellation: Equuleus
- Right ascension: 21^{h} 10^{m} 31.31410^{s}
- Declination: 10° 02′ 56.1112″
- Apparent magnitude (V): 6.07

Characteristics
- Evolutionary stage: main sequence
- Spectral type: A2 Vs (A1 Si Sr Cr)
- U−B color index: +0.04
- B−V color index: +0.02

Astrometry
Radial velocity (R_{v})	+6.9 km/s
Proper motion (μ)	RA: –0.982 mas/yr Dec.: +17.687 mas/yr
Parallax (π)	7.36±0.81 mas
Distance	approx. 440 ly (approx. 140 pc)
Absolute magnitude (M_{V})	+0.236

Details
Mass	2.412+0.045 −0.047 M_{☉}
Radius	2.68±0.08 R_{☉}
Luminosity	48.7+1.9 −2.0 L_{☉}
Surface gravity (log g)	3.738+0.006 −0.019 cgs
Temperature	9,339+32 −118 K
Rotational velocity (v sin i)	65 km/s
Age	462+75 −71 Myr

Other designations
- Protome, 6 Equ, BD+09°4735, HD 201616, HIP 104538, HR 8098, SAO 126597

Database references
SIMBAD	data

6 Equulei, also named Protome, is a probable (95% chance) astrometric binary star system in the northern constellation of Equuleus, located 440 light years away. It is barely visible to the naked eye as a dim, white-hued star with an apparent visual magnitude of 6.07. The system is moving further away from the Earth with a heliocentric radial velocity of +6.9 km/s. It forms a wide optical double with γ Equulei, at an angular separation of 336 arcseconds in 2011.

The visible component is an Ap star with a stellar classification of A2Vs, matching the evolutionary state of an A-type main sequence star while displaying "sharp" absorption lines. It is an estimated 460 million years old with a projected rotational velocity of 65 km/s. The star has 2.4 times the mass of the Sun and around 2.7 times the Sun's radius. It is radiating 49 times the luminosity of the Sun from its photosphere at an effective temperature of 9,339 K.

Protome, the Bust (of a horse), was the ancient Greek name of the constellation Equuleus. The IAU Working Group on Star Names adopted the name Protome for this star on 16 July 2026.
