= NGC 7003 =

Galaxy in the constellation Delphinus

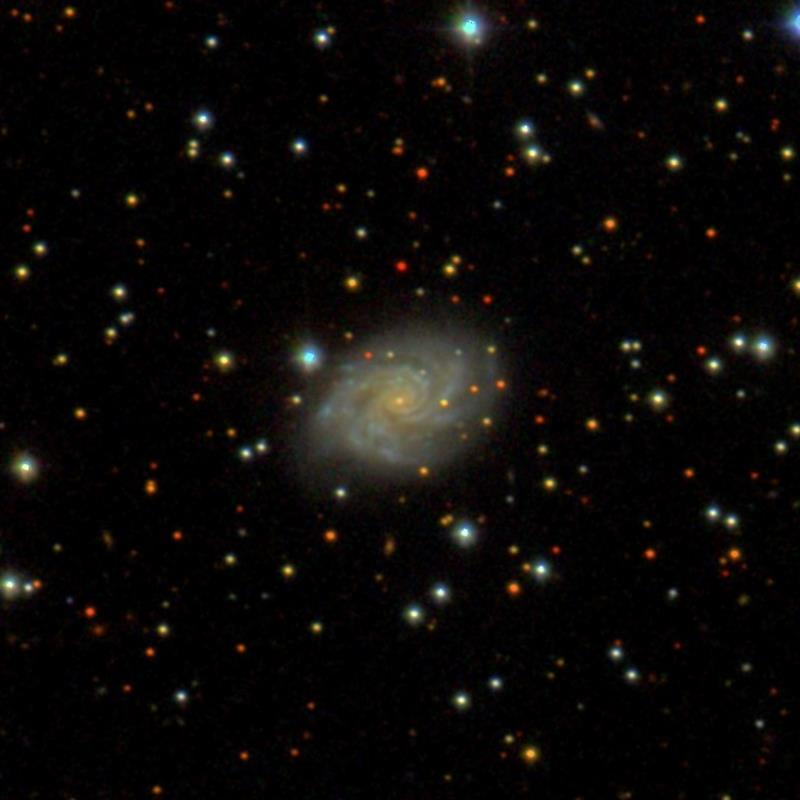
- SDSS image of NGC 7003

Observation data (J2000 epoch)
- Constellation: Delphinus
- Right ascension: 21^{h} 00^{m} 42.4^{s}
- Declination: +17° 48′ 18″
- Redshift: 0.017689
- Heliocentric radial velocity: 5303 km/s
- Distance: 222 Mly (68.2 Mpc)
- Apparent magnitude (V): 13.76

Characteristics
- Type: Sbc
- Size: ~85,600 ly (26.25 kpc) (estimated)
- Apparent size (V): 1.1 × 0.8

Other designations
- IRAS 20584+1736, UGC 11662, MCG +03-53-008, PGC 65887, CGCG 448-027

NGC 7003 is a spiral galaxy around 220 million light-years from Earth in the constellation Delphinus. NGC 7003 has an estimated diameter of 85,000 light-years. The galaxy was discovered by German astronomer Heinrich Louis d'Arrest on August 26, 1864.

The redshift of NGC 7003 places it in a filamentary ridge in the Perseus–Pisces Supercluster. The galaxy is host to a supermassive black hole with an estimated mass of 3.9 × 10^{7} M_{☉}.

== Supernova ==
One supernova has been observed in NGC 7003:

- SN 2011dk (Type II, mag. 16.5) was discovered by the Italian Supernovae Search Project (ISSP) on May 12, 2011.

== See also ==
- NGC 1300
- List of NGC objects (7001–7840)
