= 3 Equulei =

K-type giant star in the constellation Equuleus

- Location of 3 Equulei (circled)

Observation data Epoch J2000 Equinox ICRS
- Constellation: Equuleus
- Right ascension: 21^{h} 04^{m} 34.65162^{s}
- Declination: +05° 30′ 10.3117″
- Apparent magnitude (V): 5.593

Characteristics
- Evolutionary stage: red giant branch
- Spectral type: K5 III
- U−B color index: +1.934
- B−V color index: +1.651

Astrometry
Radial velocity (R_{v})	−15.26±0.2 km/s
Proper motion (μ)	RA: +13.115 mas/yr Dec.: +0.752 mas/yr
Parallax (π)	2.6635±0.0940 mas
Distance	1,220 ± 40 ly (380 ± 10 pc)
Absolute magnitude (M_{V})	−1.02

Details
Mass	7.2 M_{☉}
Radius	116 R_{☉}
Luminosity	2,581 L_{☉}
Surface gravity (log g)	1.06 cgs
Temperature	4,029 K
Rotational velocity (v sin i)	4.6 km/s

Other designations
- ζ Equ, 3 Equ, BD+04°4606, HD 200644, HIP 104031, HR 8066, SAO 126518

Database references
SIMBAD	data

3 Equulei is a single star located in the small northern constellation of Equuleus. It is faintly visible to the naked eye at an apparent visual magnitude of 5.6. Based upon an annual parallax shift of 2.7 mas, 3 Equulei is roughly 1,220 light-years (370 parsecs) distant from Earth, give or take a 40 light-year margin of error. At that distance, the apparent brightness of the star is diminished by 0.15 in visual magnitude because of extinction from interstellar gas and dust.

3 Equulei has been referred to in some sources as ζ (Zeta) Equulei, although it was not given that designation by Bayer.

== Properties ==
3 Equulei is an evolved giant star with a stellar classification of K5 III. The measured angular diameter of this star, after correction for limb darkening, is 2.44±0.03 mas. At the estimated distance of 1,220 light-years, this yields a physical size of about 100 times the radius of the Sun. It is radiating an estimated 2,581 times the luminosity of the Sun from this expanded outer envelope at an effective temperature of 4,029 K. At this temperature, it shines with the orange-hued glow of a K-type star.
