= Epsilon Equulei =

Star in the constellation Equuleus

ε Equulei
- Location of ε Equulei (circled in red)

Observation data Epoch J2000 Equinox ICRS
- Constellation: Equuleus
- Right ascension: 20^{h} 59^{m} 04.47539^{s}
- Declination: +04° 17′ 36.5211″
- Apparent magnitude (V): 5.23 (5.96 / 6.31)

Characteristics
- Spectral type: F5(V) + F6(V) + F4V
- U−B color index: +0.00
- B−V color index: +0.47

Astrometry
Radial velocity (R_{v})	8.20 ± 0.2 km/s
Proper motion (μ)	RA: -115.75 mas/yr Dec.: -151.70 mas/yr
Parallax (π)	18.49±1.35 mas
Distance	180 ± 10 ly (54 ± 4 pc)
Absolute magnitude (M_{V})	+1.65

Orbit
Period (P)	101.485 yr
Semi-major axis (a)	0.6474″
Eccentricity (e)	0.705
Inclination (i)	92.17°
Longitude of the node (Ω)	105.15°
Periastron epoch (T)	1920.37
Argument of periastron (ω) (secondary)	340.19°

Details

A
Mass	1.74 M_{☉}
Surface gravity (log g)	3.87 cgs
Temperature	6,223 K

B
Mass	1.53 M_{☉}
Surface gravity (log g)	4.29 cgs
Temperature	6,399 K
Age	1.5 Gyr

Other designations
- ε Equ, 1 Equulei, HD 199766, HIP 103569, HR 8034, SAO 126428, BD+03°4473

Database references
SIMBAD	data

Epsilon Equulei, Latinized from ε Equulei, is a star system of apparent magnitude +5.23 in the constellation of Equuleus. It is located 180 light years away from the Solar System, based on its parallax.

== Star system ==
Two stars make up the brighter part of the Epsilon Equulei star system. They are called Epsilon Equulei A and B and are main-sequence stars of spectral type of F5 and F6, respectively. The orbital period of this binary is about 101.5 years. Although the average separation between the two stars is about 0.64″, the orbit is remarkably eccentric, at 0.705. The two stars passed their periastron in 1920. Finally, it is thought that Epsilon Equulei A may be, in turn, a spectroscopic binary. The orbital period of the latter would be 2.03133 days.

Approximately 10 arcseconds away from A and B is Epsilon Equulei C (HIP 103571), with an apparent magnitude of 7.35. It is another F-type main-sequence stars, and based on its similar distance and proper motion to A and B, it is assumed to be associated.

The Epsilon Equulei system is thought to be approximately 1.5 billion years old.
