= Delta Equulei =

Star in the constellation Equuleus

- Location of δ Equulei (circled in red)

Observation data Epoch J2000.0 Equinox J2000.0 (ICRS)
- Constellation: Equuleus
- Right ascension: 21^{h} 14^{m} 28.81531^{s}
- Declination: +10° 00′ 25.1259″
- Apparent magnitude (V): 5.19 + 5.52

Characteristics
- Spectral type: F7V + F7V
- U−B color index: −0.03
- B−V color index: +0.49

Astrometry
Radial velocity (R_{v})	−16.2±0.3 km/s
Proper motion (μ)	RA: +42.39 mas/yr Dec.: −304.19 mas/yr
Parallax (π)	54.41±0.14 mas
Distance	59.9 ± 0.2 ly (18.38 ± 0.05 pc)
Absolute magnitude (M_{V})	+3.14

Orbit
Period (P)	2,084.03±0.10 d
Semi-major axis (a)	231.9650±0.0080 mas
Eccentricity (e)	0.436851±0.000025
Inclination (i)	99.4083±0.0098°
Longitude of the node (Ω)	23.362±0.012°
Periastron epoch (T)	53112.071±0.052 MHJD
Argument of periastron (ω) (secondary)	7.735±0.013°

Details

δ Equ A
Mass	1.192±0.012 M_{☉}
Radius	1.30±0.08 R_{☉}
Luminosity	2.25 L_{☉}
Temperature	6,200±150 K
Metallicity [Fe/H]	−0.07±0.09 dex
Age	3.0 Gyr

δ Equ B
Mass	1.187±0.012 M_{☉}
Radius	1.25±0.08 R_{☉}
Luminosity	2.07 L_{☉}
Temperature	6,200±150 K

Other designations
- Tepennekhet, δ Equ, 7 Equ, BD+09°4746, GJ 822, HD 202275, HIP 104858, HR 8123, SAO 126643, LTT 16227

Database references
SIMBAD	data

Delta Equulei, also named Tepennekhet, is the second brightest star in the constellation Equuleus. Delta Equulei is a binary star system about 60 light-years away, with components of class G0 and F5. Their combined magnitude is 4.47, and their absolute magnitude is 3.142. There is controversy as to the exact masses of the stars. One study puts the larger at 1.22 solar masses and the smaller at 1.17, while another pegs them at 1.66 and 1.593. The luminosity of the larger star is calculated to be 2.23 solar, and the smaller to be 2.17.

== Nomenclature ==
Delta Equulei, Latinized from δ Equulei, is the star's Bayer designation. This star was part of the ancient Egyptian constellation Nekhet, the Giant, attested in the Ramesside star clocks; its head (Tepennekhet) was in Equuleus. The IAU Working Group on Star Names adopted the name Tepennekhet for this star on 16 July 2026.

== System ==
William Herschel listed Delta Equulei as a wide binary. Friedrich Georg Wilhelm von Struve later showed this to be an unrelated optical double star. However his son Otto Wilhelm von Struve while making follow-up observations in 1852 found that while the separation of the optical double continued to increase, Delta Equulei itself appeared elongated. He concluded that it is a much more compact binary.
