= NGC 7083 =

Spiral galaxy in the constellation Indus

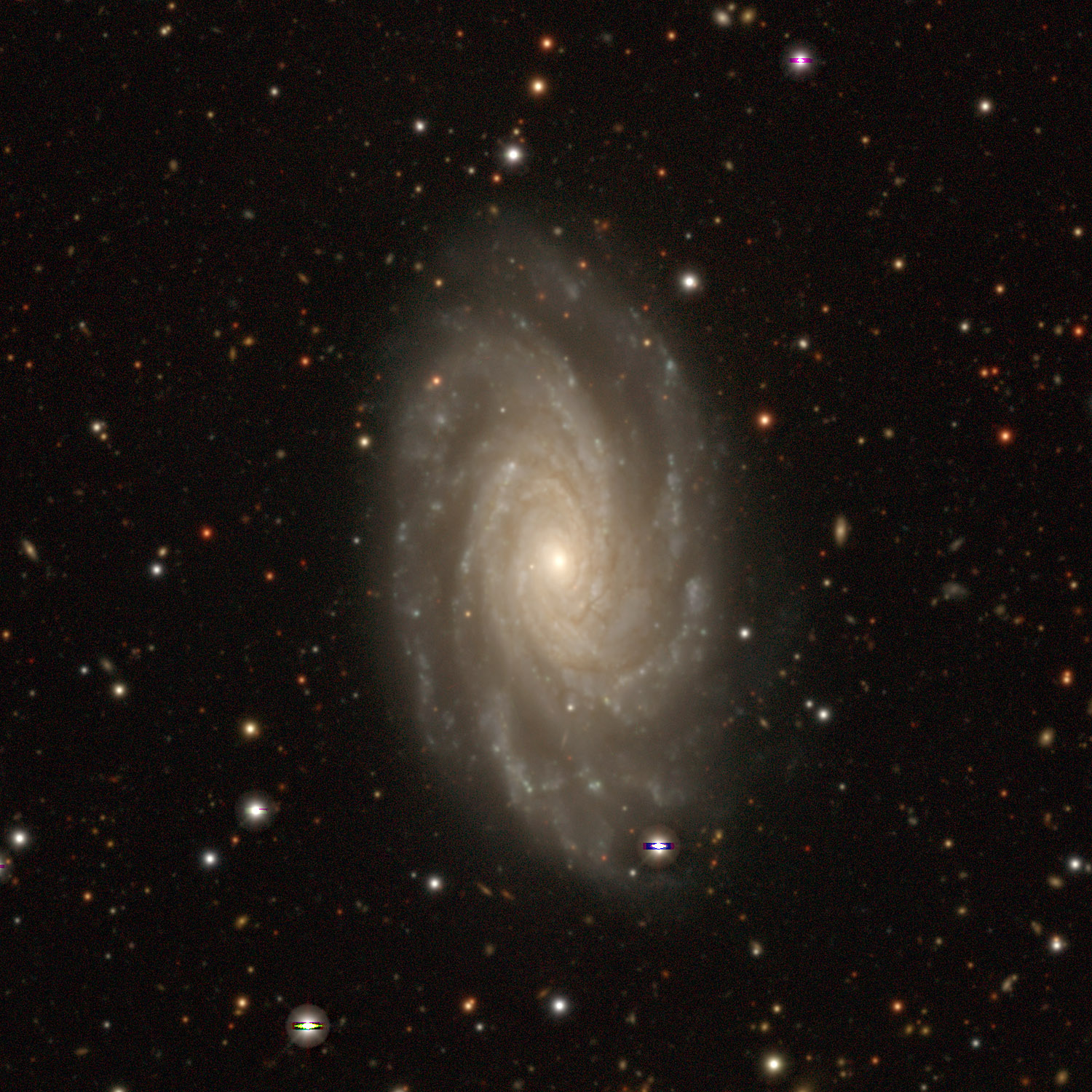
- NGC 7083 imaged by legacy surveys

Observation data (J2000 epoch)
- Constellation: Indus
- Right ascension: 21^{h} 35^{m} 44.6635^{s}
- Declination: −63° 54′ 10.204″
- Redshift: 0.010344
- Heliocentric radial velocity: 3,101 km/s
- Distance: 133.4 Mly (33.033 Mpc)
- Apparent magnitude (V): 11.87

Characteristics
- Type: SA(s)bc
- Apparent size (V): 3.9′ × 2.3′

Other designations
- ESO 107-36, IRAS 21318-6407, 2MASX J21354470-6354101, PGC 67023

NGC 7083 is an unbarred spiral galaxy located about 134 million light-years away in the constellation of Indus. It is also classified as a flocculent spiral galaxy. NGC 7083 was discovered by Scottish astronomer James Dunlop on August 28, 1826.

== Supernovae ==
Four supernovae have been observed in NGC 7083:

- SN 1983Y (type unknown, mag. 18) was discovered by Marina Wischnjewsky on 14 April 1983.
- SN 2009hm (Type Ib, mag. 14.7) was codiscovered by Stuart Parker and Berto Monard on 17 July 2009.
- SN 2019qar (Type Ib-pec, mag. 17.5) was discovered by the Distance Less Than 40 Mpc Survey (DLT40) on 12 September 2019.
- SN 2026jqi (Type Ic, mag. 18.808) was discovered by ATLAS on 15 April 2026.

== See also ==
- List of NGC objects (7001–7840)
- NGC 4414
