= Gamma Equulei =

Chemically peculiar A-type main sequence star in the constellation Equuleus

γ Equulei
- Location of γ Equulei (circled)

Observation data Epoch J2000 Equinox ICRS
- Constellation: Equuleus
- Right ascension: 21^{h} 10^{m} 20.50005^{s}
- Declination: +10° 07′ 53.6763″
- Apparent magnitude (V): 4.58 - 4.77

Characteristics
- Evolutionary stage: main sequence
- Spectral type: A9VpSrCrEu
- U−B color index: +0.10
- B−V color index: +0.26
- R−I color index: +0.10
- Variable type: roAp

Astrometry
Radial velocity (R_{v})	−16.489±0.0004 km/s
Proper motion (μ)	RA: 48.74 mas/yr Dec.: mas/yr
Parallax (π)	27.55±0.62 mas
Distance	118 ± 3 ly (36.3 ± 0.8 pc)
Absolute magnitude (M_{V})	+1.90

Details
Mass	1.78+0.12 −0.17 M_{☉}
Radius	2.11±0.07 R_{☉}
Luminosity	11.0±0.93 L_{☉}
Surface gravity (log g)	4.47 cgs
Temperature	7,550±150 K
Metallicity [Fe/H]	+0.68 dex
Rotational velocity (v sin i)	7.0±0.5 km/s
Age	1.0 Gyr

Other designations
- γ Equ, 5 Equ, BD+09°4732, FK5 1555, HD 201601, HIP 104521, HR 8097, SAO 126593

Database references
SIMBAD	data

Gamma Equulei, Latinized from γ Equulei, is a double star in the northern constellation of Equuleus. It is located at a distance of around 118 light-years (36 parsecs) from Earth and is visible to the naked eye with a slightly variable apparent visual magnitude of around 4.7. The star is drifting closer to the Sun with a radial velocity of −16.5 km/s.

== Properties ==
The primary component of γ Equulei is a chemically peculiar star with a stellar classification of A9VpSrCrEu. It has a spectrum corresponding to an A9 main sequence star, but with unusual abundances of strontium, chromium, and europium. Stars with this type of spectral peculiarity are called Ap stars. The abundances of some metals are believed to be due to chemical stratification in the slowly-rotating star, unusual for hot main sequence stars. A fairly wide range of spectral types have been published for γ Equulei, ranging from A5 to F1, some of them also indicating unusual abundances of iron in the spectrum. γ Equulei has particularly sharp absorption lines in its spectrum, a sign of very slow rotation.

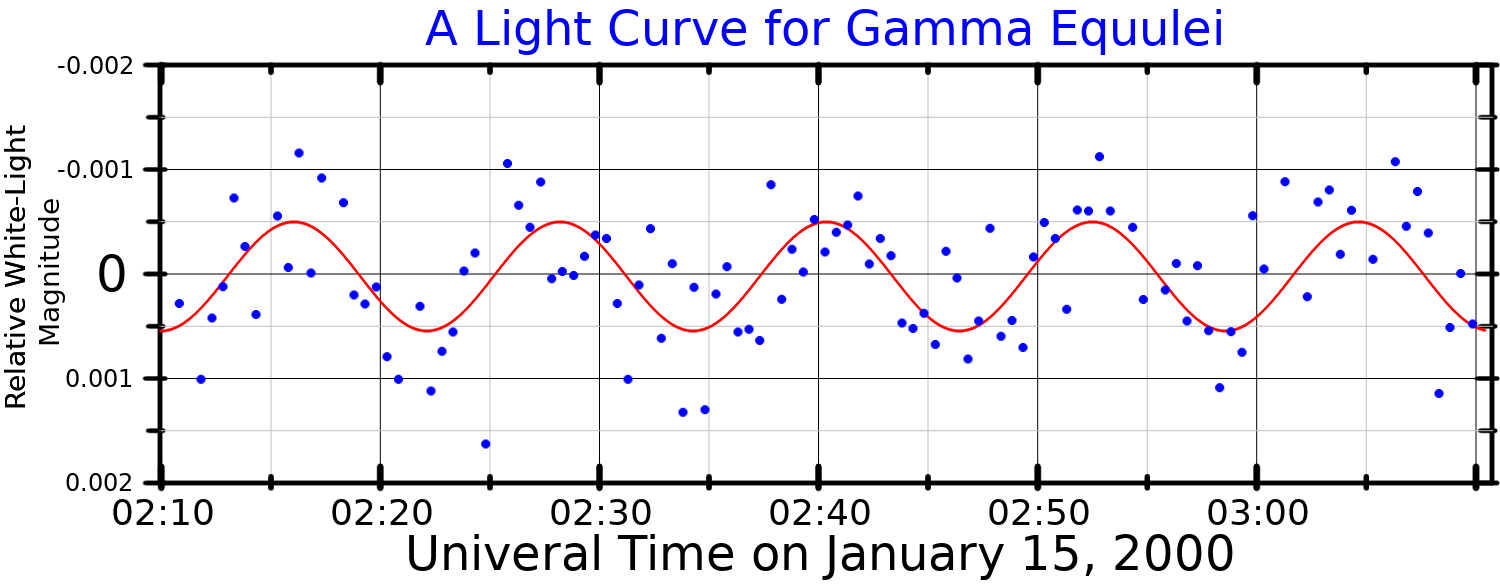
A light curve for Gamma Equulei, adapted from Gruberbauer et al. (2008). The red line shows the sine function which best fits the data, the period of which is 12.15 minutes.

γ Equulei undergoes rapid periodic variations in brightness, which places it among the rapidly oscillating Ap (roAp) stars. The apparent magnitude varies between extremes of +4.58 and +4.77. It shows pulsations in several periods near 12 minutes. The strongest pulsation is at 11.7 minutes; others are found at 11.9, 12.2, and 12.4 minutes. These are identified as a series of even and odd p-mode (pressure-induced) pulsations.

The surface magnetic field of γ Equulei undergoes slow variation, ranging from +577 G to –1,101 G. Although only 67 years of magnetic field measurements are available, a period of 97.16±3.15 years has been fit to the data. This is thought to be the rotation period of γ Equulei.

γ Equulei has a magnitude 8.69 companion at an angular separation of 1.26 arcseconds.
