= Alpha Equulei =

Star in the constellation Equuleus

α Equulei
- Location of α Equulei (circled)

Observation data Epoch J2000.0 Equinox ICRS
- Constellation: Equuleus
- Right ascension: 21^{h} 15^{m} 49.437^{s}
- Declination: +05° 14′ 52.41″
- Apparent magnitude (V): +3.919 (4.476 + 4.496)

Characteristics
- Spectral type: G7III + kA3hA4mA9
- U−B color index: +0.284
- B−V color index: +0.529

Astrometry
| Radial velocity (R_{v}) | −16.458±0.027 km/s |
| Proper motion (μ) | RA: +49.747 mas/yr Dec.: −89.846 mas/yr |
| Parallax (π) | 18.11±0.24 mas |
| Distance | 180 ± 2 ly (55.2 ± 0.7 pc) |
| Absolute magnitude (M_{V}) | +0.146 (0.689 + 1.159) |

Orbit
| Period (P) | 98.80450±0.00035 days |
| Semi-major axis (a) | 0.66±0.02 au |
| Eccentricity (e) | 0.00417±0.00076 |
| Inclination (i) | 151.52±0.28° |
| Longitude of the node (Ω) | 216.57±0.16° |
| Periastron epoch (T) | 2,457,277.7±1.7 |
| Argument of periastron (ω) (primary) | 102.9±6.3° |
| Semi-amplitude (K_{1}) (primary) | 16.190±0.036 km/s |
| Semi-amplitude (K_{2}) (secondary) | 18.92±0.61 km/s |

Details

A
| Mass | 2.20±0.16 M_{☉} |
| Radius | 9.20±0.01 R_{☉} |
| Luminosity | 47.9+12.4 −9.8 L_{☉} |
| Surface gravity (log g) | 3.08±0.11 cgs |
| Temperature | 5,160±65 K |
| Metallicity [Fe/H] | +0.11±0.06 dex |
| Rotational velocity (v sin i) | 5.53±0.14 km/s |
| Age | 1.0–1.2 Gyr |

B
| Mass | 1.883±0.083 M_{☉} |
| Radius | 2.60±0.03 R_{☉} |
| Luminosity | 26.9+3.3 −2.9 L_{☉} |
| Surface gravity (log g) | 3.87±0.15 cgs |
| Temperature | 8,260±218 K |
| Metallicity [Fe/H] | +0.14±0.16 dex |
| Rotational velocity (v sin i) | 25.88±3.45 km/s |
| Age | 1.0–1.2 Gyr |

Other designations
- Kitalphar, 8 Equulei, HR 8131, HD 202447, BD+04 4635, HIP 104987, SAO 126662, FK5 800, GC 29735

Database references
| SIMBAD | data |

Alpha Equulei (α Equulei, abbreviated Alpha Equ, α Equ), officially named Kitalpha /kɪˈtælfə/, is the brightest star in the constellation of Equuleus. It is a binary system with an orbital period of 98.8 days and a sky separation of a few milliarcseconds, too small to be resolved with the naked eye.

== Nomenclature ==
α Equulei (Latinised to Alpha Equulei) is the star's Bayer designation.

It bore the traditional name Kitalpha (rarely Kitel Phard or Kitalphar), a contraction of the Arabic name قطعة الفرس qiṭ‘a(t) al-faras—"a piece of the horse". In 2016, the International Astronomical Union organized a Working Group on Star Names (WGSN) to catalogue and standardize proper names for stars. The WGSN approved the name Kitalpha for α Equulei A on 21 August 2016 and it is now so entered in the IAU Catalog of Star Names.

In Chinese, 虚宿 (Xū Sù), meaning Emptiness, is an asterism consisting of Alpha Equulei and Beta Aquarii. Consequently, the Chinese name for Alpha Equulei itself is 虛宿二 (Xū Sù èr, English: the Second Star of Emptiness).

== Properties ==
The overall appearance of α Equulei is a G-type giant with an apparent magnitude of +3.92, but it is a spectroscopic binary consisting of two individual stars.

The primary star is a G7 giant about fifty times more luminous than the Sun. It has an effective temperature of 5,160 K and a radius of 9.2 times greater than the Sun.

The secondary is an A-type main-sequence star that is about 27 times as luminous as the Sun. It has an effective temperature of 8,260 K and a radius 2.60 times greater than the Sun. It is a chemically peculiar Am star.

The two stars revolve in a circular orbit every 98.8045 days. Their respective orbital velocities allow their masses to be calculated at 2.20 M_{☉} and 1.88 M_{☉}, respectively.
