= NGC 7042 =

Galaxy in the constellation Pegasus

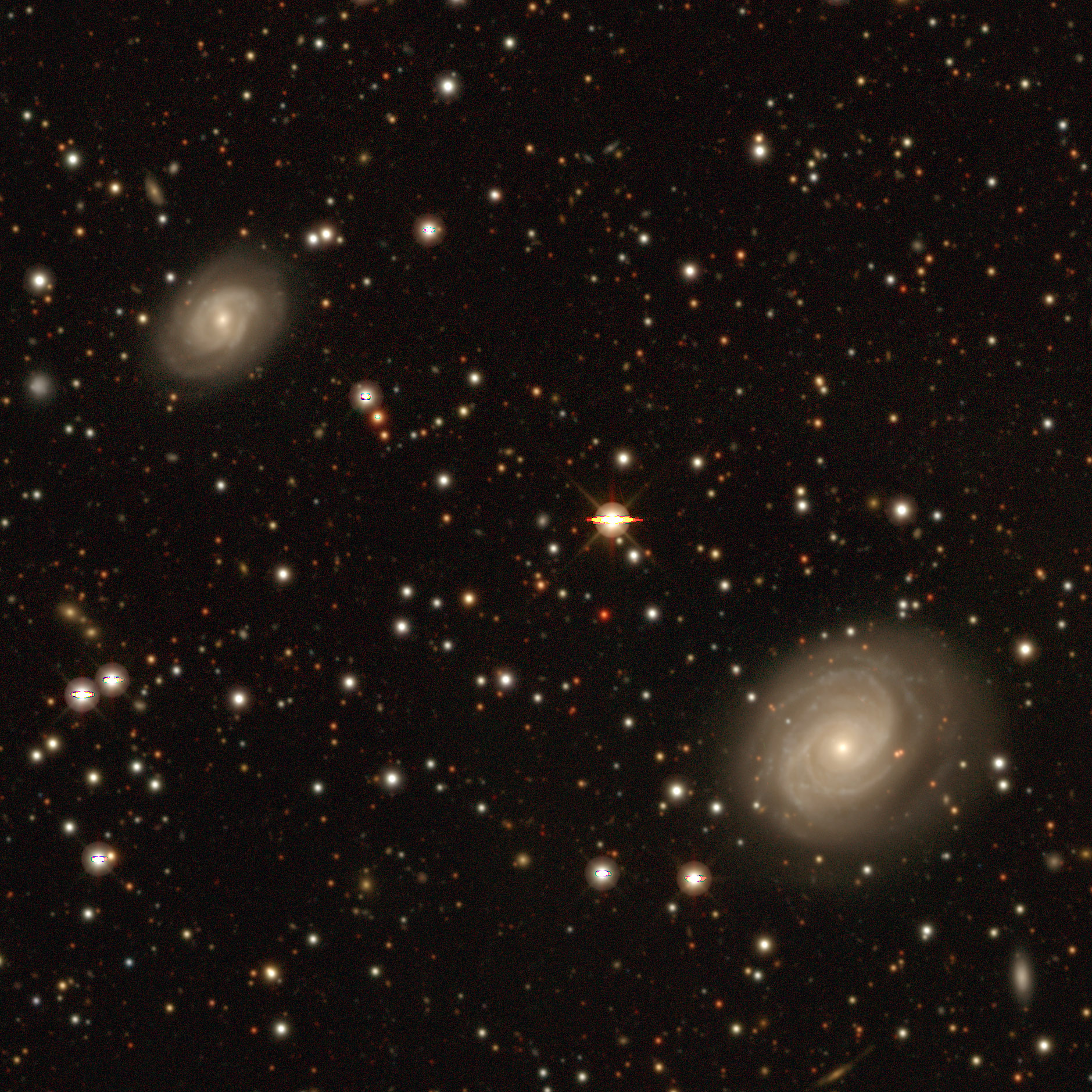
- The spiral galaxy NGC 7042 (lower right) and NGC 7043 (upper left).

Observation data (J2000 epoch)
- Constellation: Pegasus
- Right ascension: 21^{h} 13^{m} 45.9074^{s}
- Declination: +13° 34′ 29.745″
- Redshift: 0.016952
- Heliocentric radial velocity: 5,082 km/s
- Distance: 211.9 Mly
- Apparent magnitude (V): 12.77

Characteristics
- Type: Sb
- Size: ~146,110 ly (estimated)
- Apparent size (V): 2.0 x 1.8

Other designations
- KCPG 555A, IRAS 21113+1321, UGC 11702, MCG 2-54-13, PGC 66378, CGCG 426-23

NGC 7042 is a spiral galaxy located about 210 million light-years away in the constellation of Pegasus. NGC 7042 is part of a pair of galaxies that contains the galaxy NGC 7043. Astronomer William Herschel discovered NGC 7042 on October 16, 1784.

== Supernova ==
One supernova has been observed in NGC 7042:

- SN 2013fw (Type Ia, mag. 17.1) was discovered by Zhangwei Jin and Xing Gao on October 23, 2013.
