= NGC 7013 =

Spiral or lenticular galaxy in the constellation Cygnus

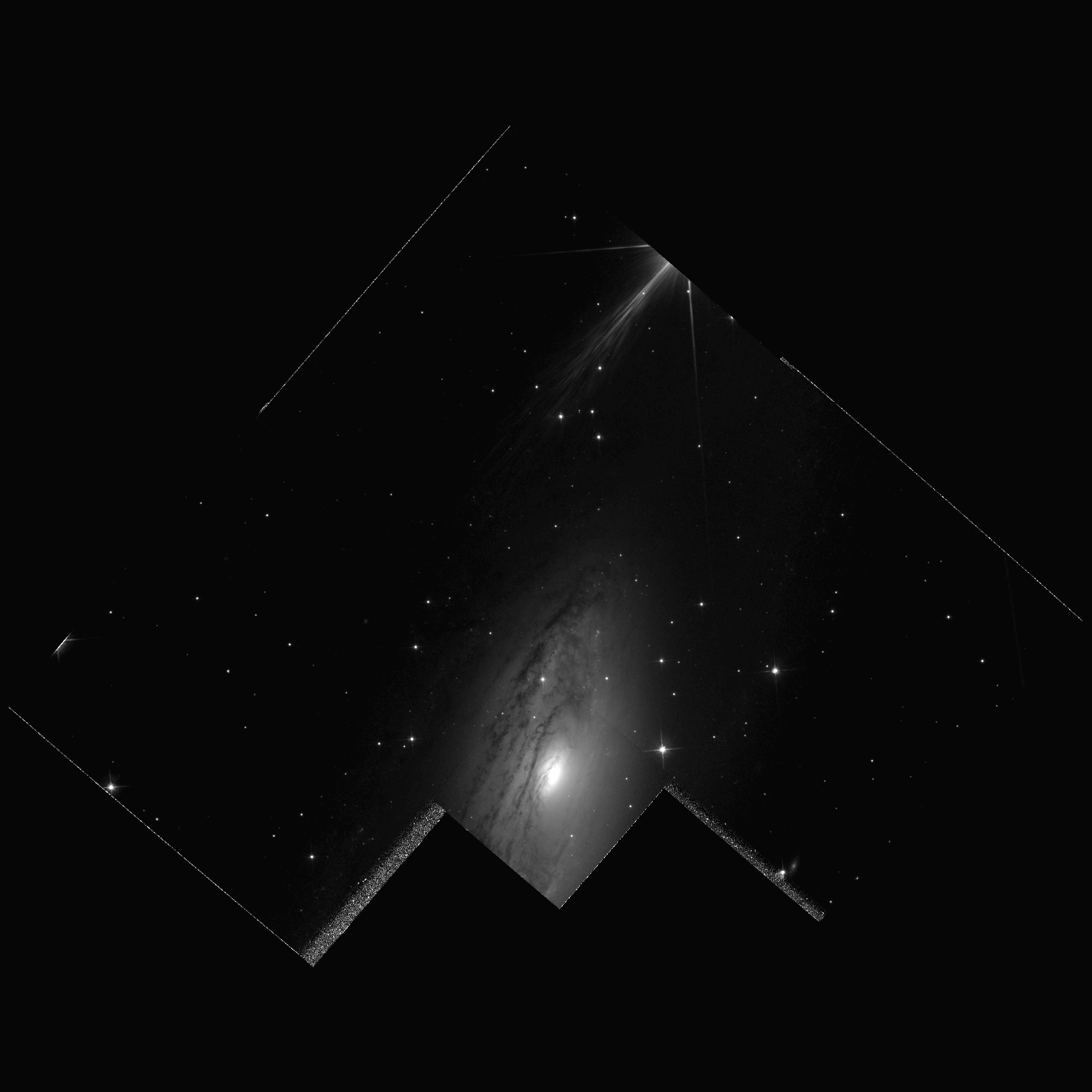
- Hubble image of NGC 7013.

Observation data (J2000 epoch)
- Constellation: Cygnus
- Right ascension: 21^{h} 03^{m} 33.6^{s}
- Declination: 29° 53′ 51″
- Redshift: 0.002598
- Heliocentric radial velocity: 779 km/s
- Distance: 37–41.4 Mly (11.3–12.7 Mpc) (estimated)
- Apparent magnitude (V): 12.40

Characteristics
- Type: SA(r)0/a, LINER
- Size: ~57,800 ly (17.72 kpc) (estimated)
- Apparent size (V): 4.0 × 1.4

Other designations
- IRAS 21014+2941, UGC 11670, MCG 5-49-1, PGC 66003, CGCG 491-2

NGC 7013 is a relatively nearby spiral or lenticular galaxy estimated to be around 37 to 41.4 million light-years away from Earth in the constellation of Cygnus. NGC 7013 was discovered by English astronomer William Herschel on July 17, 1784 and was also observed by his son, astronomer John Herschel on September 15, 1828.

== Physical characteristics ==
NGC 7013 is tilted 90° to the Earth's line of sight, allowing its structure to be seen. However, NGC 7013 is classified as either as a spiral galaxy with tightly wound arms or as a lenticular galaxy. NGC 7013 is also considered part of a class of galactic nuclei that is defined by their spectral line emissions, called low-ionization nuclear emission-line region galaxies or LINERs. The galaxy appears to have two rings in its structure. The inner ring appears to completely disconnect from the central bulge while the stars in the outer ring appear to have very little spiral pattern. Optical images of NGC 7013 show that it has a small bulge with a bright inner ring and a faint disk both crossed by dust lanes. A longer exposure of the galaxy made by the Palomar Observatory-National Geographic Sky Survey shows an extended disk around the bulge and the inner ring. The disk shows little structure except for a faint, thin spiral-like feature running through the galaxy.

=== HI distribution ===
The neutral atomic hydrogen distribution in NGC 7013 is mostly located in the two rings. In between the two rings there is a very low concentration of interstellar medium. The low level of neutral atomic hydrogen in the disk of NGC 7013 and the reddish color of the galaxy suggests that the gas content of the galactic disc has fallen below the threshold at which star formation is likely to take place. The small bulge-to-disk ratio and the slow rotation velocity show that NGC 7013 is a low-mass, low-density galaxy unlike the more luminous, typical lenticular galaxies. The galaxy may thus be a former late-type spiral galaxy which have exhausted most of its interstellar gas, either by star formation or by internal sweeping.

=== Gallery ===
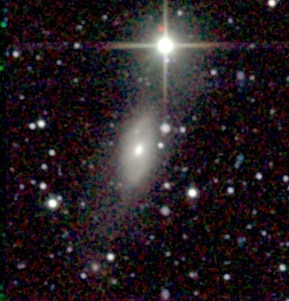
2MASS image of NGC 7013

== See also ==
- Black Eye Galaxy
- NGC 4414
- List of NGC objects (7001–7840)
- NGC 7020
