= Equuleus =

Constellation in the northern celestial hemisphere

- Constellation
- List of stars in Equuleus
- Abbreviation: Equ
- Genitive: Equulei
- Pronunciation: /ɪˈkwuːliəs/ Equúleus, genitive /ɪˈkwuːliaɪ/
- Symbolism: the pony
- Right ascension: 20^{h} 56^{m} 10.9212^{s}–21^{h} 26^{m} 20.0331^{s}
- Declination: 13.0390635°–2.4773185°
- Quadrant: NQ4
- Area: 72 sq. deg. (87th)
- Main stars: 3
- Bayer/Flamsteed stars: 10
- Stars brighter than 3.00^{m}: 0
- Stars within 10.00 pc (32.62 ly): 0
- Brightest star: α Equ (Kitalpha) (3.92^{m})
- Nearest star: HD 200779
- Messier objects: 0
- Meteor showers: 0
- Bordering constellations: Aquarius; Delphinus; Pegasus
- Visible at latitudes between +90° and −80°. Best visible at 21:00 (9 p.m.) during the month of September.

Equuleus is a faint constellation located just north of the celestial equator. Its name is Latin for "little horse", a foal. It was one of the 48 constellations listed by the 2nd century astronomer Ptolemy, and remains one of the 88 modern constellations. It is the second smallest of the modern constellations (after Crux), spanning only 72 square degrees. It is also very faint, having no stars brighter than the fourth magnitude.

== Features ==
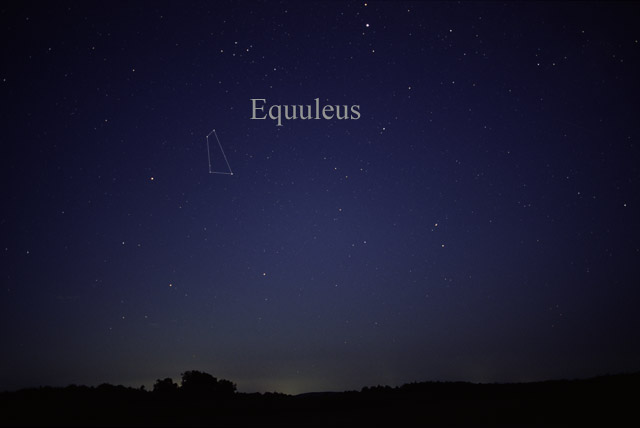
The constellation Equuleus as it can be seen by the naked eye.

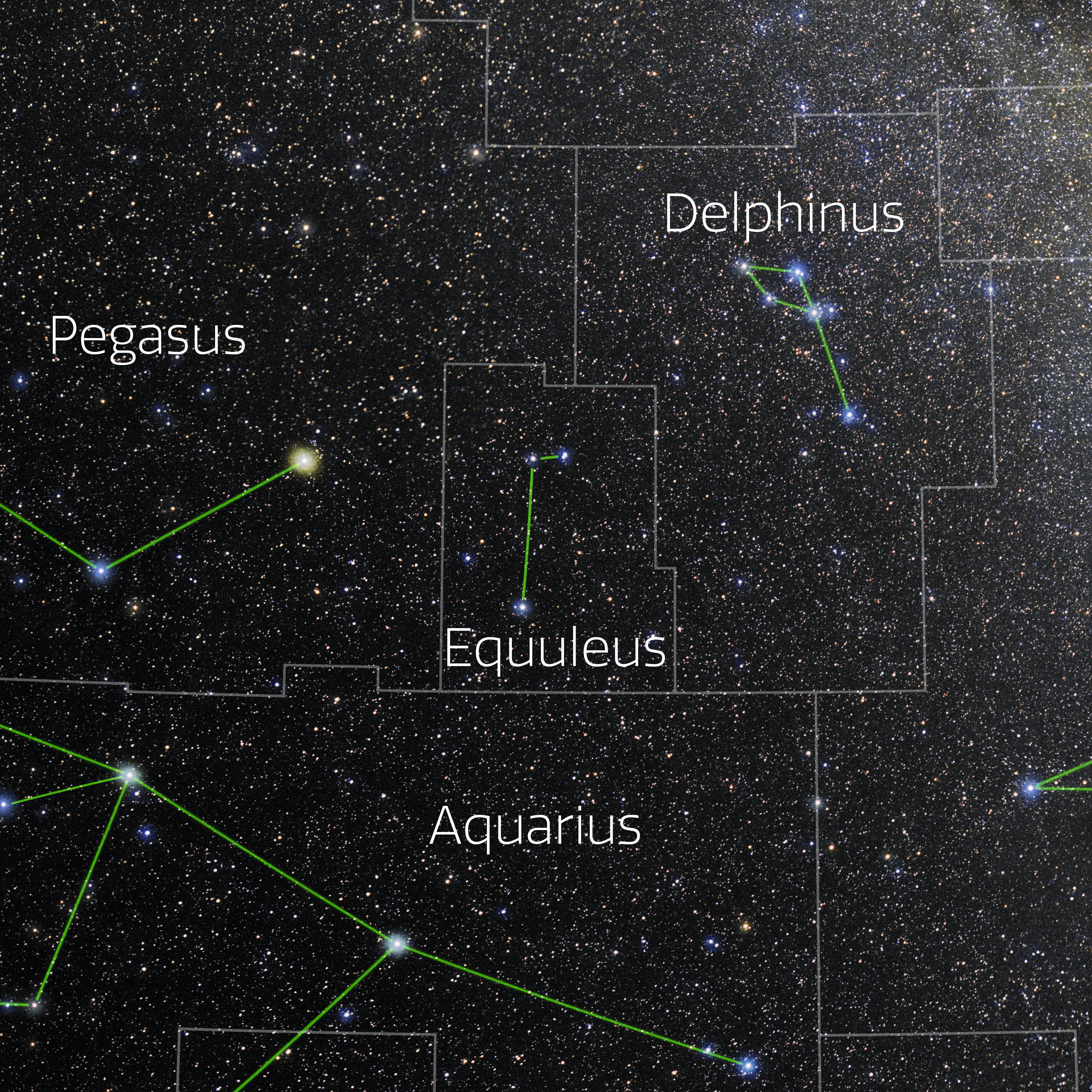
The constellation Equuleus showing the IAU boundaries, the constellation stick figure, and labels for its brightest stars. Astrophotograph by Eckhard Slawik, from NOIRLab's 88 Constellations project.

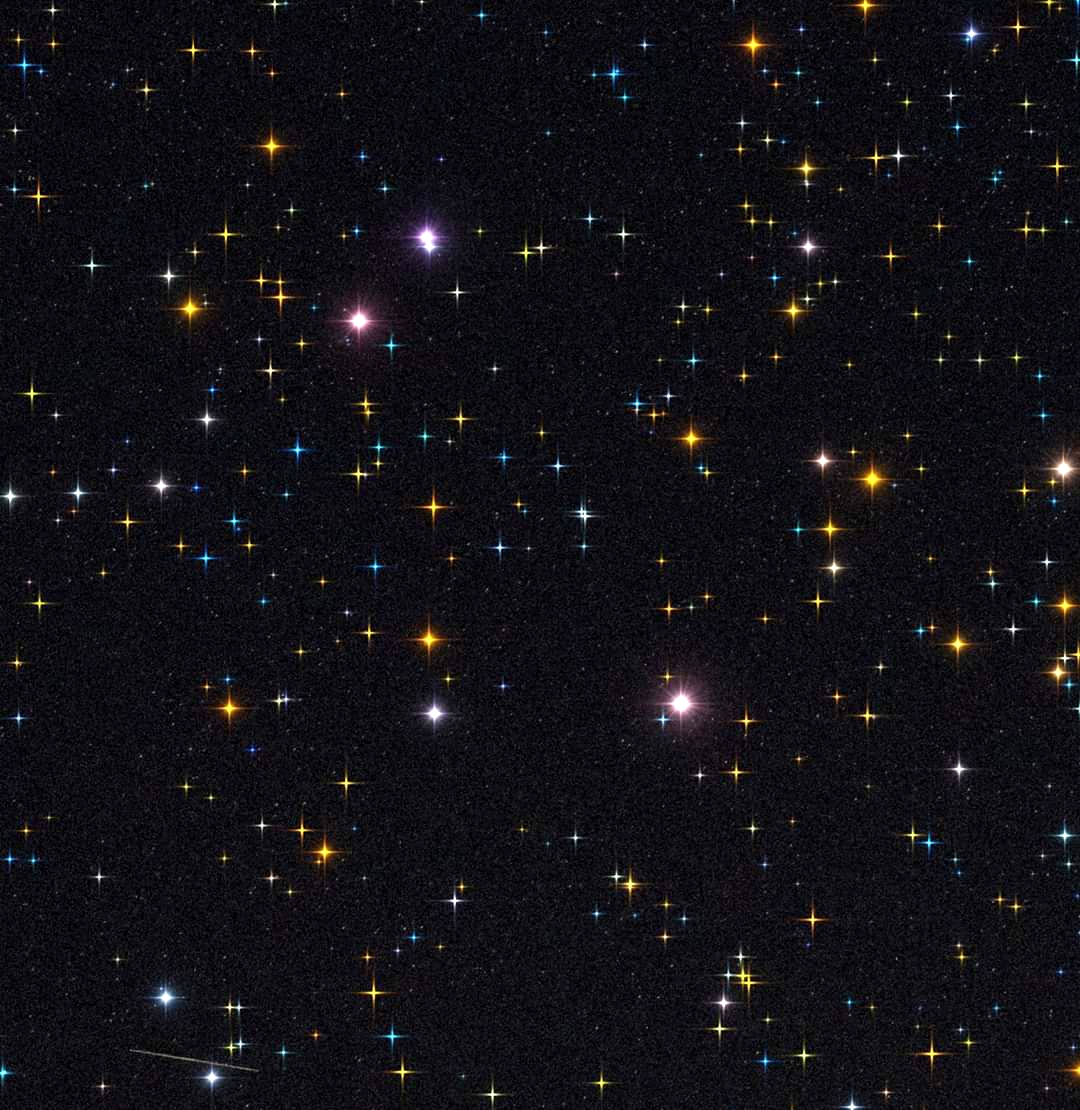
The constellation Equuleus, color and contrast enhanced.

=== Stars ===
Bayer gave 4 stars Bayer designations Alpha through Delta as the most prominent stars in the constellation. In 1801, Bode added more designations through Lambda, but only Epsilon remained in use (Lambda is technically still in use, but some atlases often don't include it).

The brightest star in Equuleus is α Equulei, traditionally called Kitalpha, a yellow star magnitude 3.9, 186 light-years from Earth. Its traditional name means "the section of the horse".

There are few variable stars in Equuleus. Only around 25 are known, most of which are faint. γ Equulei is an α^{2} CVn variable star, ranging between magnitudes 4.58 and 4.77 over a period of around 12½ minutes. It is a white star 115 light-years from Earth, and has an optical companion of magnitude 6.1, 6 Equulei. It is divisible in binoculars. 6 Equulei is an astrometric binary system itself, with an apparent magnitude of 6.07. R Equulei is a Mira variable that ranges between magnitudes 8.0 and 15.7 over nearly 261 days. It has a spectral type of M3e-M4e and has an average B-V colour index of +1.41.

Equuleus contains some double stars of interest. γ Equulei consists of a primary star with a magnitude around 4.7 (slightly variable) and a secondary star of magnitude 11.6, separated by 2 arcseconds. ε Equulei is a triple star also designated 1 Equulei. The system, 197 light-years away, has a primary of magnitude 5.4 that is itself a binary star; its components are of magnitude 6.0 and 6.3 and have a period of 101 years. The secondary is of magnitude 7.4 and is visible in small telescopes. The components of the primary are becoming closer together and will not be divisible in amateur telescopes beginning in 2015. δ Equulei is a binary star with an orbital period of 5.7 years, which at one time was the shortest known orbital period for an optical binary. The two components of the system are never more than 0.35 arcseconds apart.

=== Deep-sky objects ===
Due to its small size and its distance from the plane of the Milky Way, Equuleus is rather devoid of deep sky objects such as star clusters and nebulae. Some very faint galaxies in the New General Catalogue between magnitudes 13 and 15 include NGC 7015, NGC 7040, and NGC 7046. NGC 7045 is a triple star that was mistaken as a nebula by its discoverer, John Herschel. Other faint galaxies in the Index Catalogue include IC 1360, IC 1361, IC 1364, IC 1367, IC 1375, and IC 5083. IC 1365 is a group of galaxies. The magnitudes of these objects vary from 14.5 to 15.5, making them hard to see in even the largest of amateur telescopes.

== Mythology ==
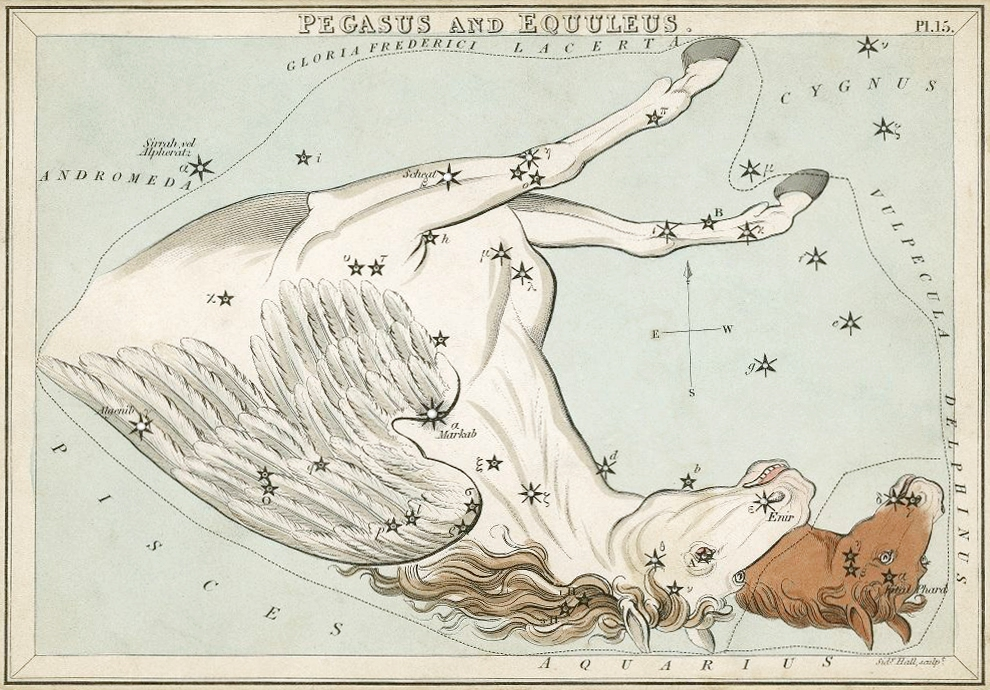
Seen in Urania's Mirror (1825)

In Greek mythology, one myth associates Equuleus with the foal Celeris (meaning "swiftness" or "speed"), who was the offspring or brother of the winged horse Pegasus. Celeris was given to Castor by Mercury. Other myths say that Equuleus is the horse struck from Poseidon's trident, during the contest between him and Athena when deciding which would be the superior. Because this section of stars rises before Pegasus, it is often called Equus Primus, or the First Horse. Equuleus is also linked to the story of Philyra and Saturn.

Created by Hipparchus and included by Ptolemy, it abuts Pegasus; unlike the larger horse, it is depicted as a horse's head alone.

== Equivalents ==
In Chinese astronomy, the stars that correspond to Equuleus are located within the Black Tortoise of the North (北方玄武, Běi Fāng Xuán Wǔ).

== See also ==
- Equuleus (Chinese astronomy)
