= List of star systems within 400–450 light-years =

This is a list of star systems within 400–450 light years of Earth.

== List ==
Key
#	Visible to the unaided eye
$	Bright star (absolute magnitude of +8.5 or brighter)
‡	White dwarf
§	Brown dwarf or sub-brown dwarf
*	Nearest in constellation

System	Star or (sub-) brown dwarf	Distance (ly)	Constellation	Coordinates: RA, Dec (Ep J2000, Eq J2000)	Stellar class	Apparent magnitude (V)	Parallax (mas)	Notes and additional references
Beta² Scorpii (HR 5984)		400	Scorpius		B2V	4.92		
RX J1856.5−3754		400			Neutron Star	25.6		The closest Neutron Star to Earth. Part of The Magnificent Seven group of nearby young cooling Neutron stars.
HD 23514		400			F6V	9.43		Has 1 potential exoplanet.
Delta Scorpii (Dschubba)	A	400	Scorpius		B0.3 IV	1.59 - 2.32		
Delta Scorpii (Dschubba)	B	400	Scorpius		B1-3V			
2MASS J0441+2301 (2MASS J04414489+2301513)		400 ± 10			M4.5			
Electra (17 Tauri)		400 ± 10	Taurus		B6 IIIe	3.70		Part of Pleiades Cluster (M45).
Psi² Aquarii		400 ± 20	Aquarius		B5 Vn	4.403		
Beta¹ Scorpii (Acrab/HR 5985)	A	400 ± 40	Scorpius		B0.5IV-V	2.62		
Beta¹ Scorpii (Acrab/HR 5985)	B	400 ± 40	Scorpius		B1.5V			
Kappa Herculis B		401 ± 2	Hercules		K0IV	6.25		
Kepler-445		401 ± 2			M4V	18.19		Has 4 exoplanets.
HR 3643	A	401 ± 7			F8II	4.48 + 14.50		
HR 3643	B	401 ± 7			DA1.6			
HD 61248 (Q Carinae)		402 ± 7	Carina		K3 III	4.93		
2MASS J0441+2301 (2MASS J04414565+2301580)		403 ± 4			M8.5	15.20		
WASP-132		403.0 ± 0.9			K4V	11.938		Has 3 exoplanets.
HD 30442 (HR 1527)		403 ± 5			M3 IIIab		5.47±0.01	
Beta Sextantis		404	Sextans		B5V			
Epsilon Canis Majoris (Adhara)		405 ± 7	Canis Major		B2 II or B2 III-II	1.50		
K2-148		407			K7V			Has 3 exoplanets.
HD 187420		407 ± 4			G8/K0 III	5.71±0.01		
Kepler-78 (KIC 8435766)		407.3 ± 0.5			G	11.72		Has 1 confirmed exoplanet (Kepler-78b).
Betelgeuse (Alpha Orionis)	A	408 – 548+90 −49	Orion		M1–M2 Ia–ab	+0.50		The closest red supergiant star and One of the closest core-collapse supernova candidates to Earth.
Betelgeuse (Alpha Orionis)	B	408 – 548+90 −49	Orion		F			The closest red supergiant star and One of the closest core-collapse supernova candidates to Earth.
CWISE J1249+3621		408±26			sdL1			Closest Known Hypervelocity Star to Earth.
HD 76230		410			A0 V			Part of Platais 8 Open Cluster.
Beta Piscium (Fumalsamakah)		410 ± 10	Pisces		B6Ve	4.40		
Mu Lyrae (Alathfar)		412 ± 7	Lyra		A3IVn	5.11		
HD 82886 (Illyrian)		413 ± 2			G0	7.63		
HD 110506		414			B9Vn			
HD 187421		414 ± 2			A1/3 V	6.37±0.01		
Beta Pyxidis		416	Pyxis		G5III			
HATS-72 (Zembra)		416			K4			
Gamma Chamaeleontis		418 ± 6	Chamaeleon		K5 III	4.12		
HD 147506 (HAT-P-2/Hunor)		419.2 ± 0.6			F8V	+8.71		Has one confirmed exoplanet (HAT-P-2b/Magor).
SDSS J1228+1040		420 ± 4			DAZ			
HD 23753		420 ± 10			B9 Vn	5.44		Part of Pleiades Cluster (M45).
Beta Sagittae (Shakh)		420 ± 10	Sagitta		G8 IIIa CN 0.5	4.38		
HD 136138 (HR 5692)	A	420 ± 10			G8IIIa	5.68 + 15.3		
HD 136138 (HR 5692)	B	420 ± 10			DA1.7			
Gamma Lupi		420 ± 30	Lupus		B2 IV	2.77		
HK Tauri B		420 ± 30	Taurus		M2	15.10		
PSR J0108−1431		424	Cetus		PSR	≥ 27.8		The closest known Pulsar to earth.
WASP-11 (HAT-P-10)		424 ± 3			K3V	11.57 ± 0.15		Has one confirmed exoplanet (WASP-11b/HAT-P-10b).
HD 74389	Ba	425 ± 4			DA1.3	14.62		
HD 74389	Bb	425 ± 4			M?			
HD 175541 (Kaveh)		427 ± 1			G6/8IV	8.02		
HD 74389 A		427 ± 4			A2V	7.48		
TOI-5108 (BD+12 2298)		427.6±2.0			G5			Has one known exoplanet.
HK Tauri A		428 ± 2	Taurus		M1.5	15.10		
Epsilon Circini		428 ± 8	Circinus		K2.5 III	4.86		
WASP-34 (Amansinaya)		428.0 ± 0.9			G5	+10.28		Has one confirmed exoplanet (WASP-34b/Haik).
HD 30856 (Mouhoun)		429 ± 1			K0III	7.911		
FU Tauri A		429 ± 8	Taurus		M7.25			
Theta Antliae	A	430	Antlia		A8 Vm	4.79		
Theta Antliae	B	430	Antlia		G7 III			
Celaeno (16 Tauri)		430	Taurus		B7IV	+5.448		Part of Pleiades Cluster (M45).
HD 200661		430 ± 2			K0 III			
66 Aquarii (g¹ Aquarii)		430 ± 10	Aquarius		K3 III	4.673		
50 Camelopardalis		430 ± 20			B9Vn	5.36 + 8.40		
Epsilon Centauri		430 ± 30	Centaurus		B1 III	+2.30		
21 Tauri (Asterope/Sterope I)		431 ± 8	Taurus		B8 V	5.76		Part of Pleiades Cluster (M45).
Atlas (27 Tauri)		431 ± 13	Taurus		B8III	3.63		Part of Pleiades Cluster (M45).
HD 131496 (Arcalís)		432 ± 1			K0	7.96		Has one confirmed exoplanet (HD 131496b/Madriu).
95 Herculis (Bodu)	B	432 ± 3	Hercules		G5III	5.10		
95 Herculis (Bodu)	A	432 ± 4	Hercules		A2IV	4.83±0.01		
HD 173416 (Xihe)		433 ± 1			G8 III	6.04		
HD 23923		435±4	Taurus		B8V	6.16		Part of Pleiades Cluster (M45).
WISPIT 2		437 ± 1			K	11.60 ±0.12		
Nu Centauri (Heng)		437 ± 10	Centaurus		B2 IV	3.41		
HAT-P-3 (Dombay)		439.8 ± 0.8			K5	11.577(67)		Has one confirmed exoplanet (HAT-P-3b/Teberda).
Alcyone (Eta Tauri)		440	Taurus		B5IIIe	2.87		Part of Pleiades Cluster (M45).
Taygeta (19 Tauri)		440	Taurus		B6IV	4.30		Part of Pleiades Cluster (M45).
Zeta Tauri (Tianguan)		440	Taurus		B2 IIIpe	3.010		
6 Equulei (Protome)		440	Equuleus		A2 Vs (A1 Si Sr Cr)			
FU Tauri B		440	Taurus		M9.25			
ROXs 42	A	440	Ophiuchus		M			Has one confirmed exoplanet (ROXs 42Bb).
ROXs 42	B	440	Ophiuchus		M			Has one confirmed exoplanet (ROXs 42Bb).
Gamma Canis Majoris (Muliphein)		440 ± 10	Canis Minor		B8II	+4.10		
Omicron Aquarii		440 ± 10	Aquarius		B7 IVe	+4.71		
27 Aquilae		440 ± 20	Aquila	19^{h} 20^{m} 35.68321^{s} −00° 53′ 31.8067″	B9III	5.49		
Zeta Ophiuchi		440 ± 40	Ophiuchus		O9.5 V	2.56 – 2.58		The closest O-type star and One of the closest core-collapse supernova candidates to Earth.
DH Tauri		441 ± 4	Taurus		M0-M1Ve(T)	13.1		Has one confirmed exoplanet (DH Tauri b).
HD 145457 (Kamuy)		441.5 ± 0.9			K0 III	6.57		
HD 23410		443±5			A0V			Part of Pleiades Cluster (M45).
RS Canum Venaticorum	A	444 ± 1	Canis Venatici		F6IV	7.93 to 9.14		
RS Canum Venaticorum	B	444 ± 1	Canis Venatici		G8IV			
22 Tauri (Sterope II)		444 ± 6	Taurus		A0 Vn	6.43		Part of Pleiades Cluster (M45).
18 Tauri		444 ± 7	Taurus		B8 V	5.66		Part of Pleiades Cluster (M45).
HIP 78530		445.8+4.87 −4.77			B9V	7.1691±0.0459		Has 1 exoplanet.
HD 146389 (WASP-38/Irena)		446 ± 3			F8	9.447±0.024		
Polaris (Alpha Ursae Minoris/North Star/Pole Star)	A	446.5±1.1	Ursa Minor		F7Ib	1.98		The closest star to the celestial north pole and the closest Cepheid variable.
Polaris (Alpha Ursae Minoris/North Star/Pole Star)	B	446.5±1.1	Ursa Minor		F6			The closest star to the celestial north pole and the closest Cepheid variable.
Polaris (Alpha Ursae Minoris/North Star/Pole Star)	C	446.5±1.1	Ursa Minor		F3V	8.7		The closest star to the celestial north pole and the closest Cepheid variable.
System	Star or (sub-) brown dwarf	Distance (ly)	Constellation	Coordinates: RA, Dec (Ep J2000, Eq J2000)	Stellar class	Apparent magnitude (V)	Parallax (mas)	Notes and additional references

== See also ==
- List of star systems within 350–400 light-years
- List of star systems within 450–500 light-years
