= List of star systems within 350–400 light-years =

The following star systems are within 350–400 light-years of Earth.

== List ==
Key
#	Visible to the unaided eye
$	Bright star (absolute magnitude of +8.5 or brighter)
‡	White dwarf
§	Brown dwarf or sub-brown dwarf
*	Nearest in constellation

System	Star or (sub-) brown dwarf	Distance (ly)	Constellation	Coordinates: RA, Dec (Ep J2000, Eq J2000)	Stellar class	Apparent magnitude (V)	Parallax (mas)	Notes and additional references
Rho Orionis		350	Orion		K0 III	+4.44		
HD 2		350.55			F5	8.2		
Zeta¹ Antliae A		350 ± 2	Antlia		A0 V	5.76		
Omicron Andromedae (Alfarasalkamil)		350 ± 20	Andromeda		B6III	3.62		
Theta Apodis		350 ± 30	Apus		M7 III	4.65 - 6.20		
Gamma² Andromedae	Ba	350±30	Andromeda	02^{h} 03^{m} 54.720^{s} +42° 19′ 51.41″	B9.5V	5.5	9.19±0.73	Part of Gamma Andromedae system
Gamma² Andromedae	Bb	350±30	Andromeda	02^{h} 03^{m} 54.720^{s} +42° 19′ 51.41″	B9.5V	5.5	9.19±0.73	Part of Gamma Andromedae system
Gamma² Andromedae	C	350±30	Andromeda	02^{h} 03^{m} 54.720^{s} +42° 19′ 51.41″	A0V	6.3	9.19±0.73	Part of Gamma Andromedae system
Eta Piscium (Alpherg)		350 ± 30	Pisces		G7 IIIa	+3.611		
Kepler-102		352.5 ± 0.4			K3V	12.07		Has 5 exoplanets.
HD 111520		352.6±0.7			F5/6V			Has one known exoplanet.
HD 100546 (KR Muscae)		353 ± 1	Musca		kB8 – A0Vae		6.68 – 6.87	Has a possible exoplanet.
HD 231701 (Uruk)		353.8 ± 0.6			F8 V	8.97		
HD 104900		354			B9Vn			
V1298 Tauri		354 ± 2	Taurus		K0-K1.5	10.31 - 10.43		Has 4 exoplanets.
Rho Hydrae		354 ± 8	Hydra		A0 Vn	4.34		
HD 115587		356.2±0.5			G0			Has one known exoplanet.
Tau¹ Aquarii		357 ± 2	Aquarius		B9 V	+5.66		
ADS 9731	B	358 ± 1	Corona Borealis		G4V	6.9		
ADS 9731	C	358.5 ± 0.8	Corona Borealis		F3V	6.9		
ADS 9731	Aa	358.6 ± 0.7	Corona Borealis		F4V	6.9		
ADS 9731	Ab	358.6 ± 0.7	Corona Borealis		F5V			
ADS 9731	Da	359 ± 1	Corona Borealis		F7V	6.9		
ADS 9731	Db	359 ± 1	Corona Borealis		M3V			
K2-302		359.3			G			Has 3 exoplanets.
81 Geminorum (g Geminorum)		360 ± 10	Gemini		K4 III	4.89		
Psi² Lupi		360 ± 10	Lupus	15^{h} 42^{m} 41.02206^{s} −34° 42′ 37.4617″	B5V	4.75	8.97±0.27	
Epsilon Chamaeleontis	A	360 ± 10	Chamaeleon		B9 Vn:			
Epsilon Chamaeleontis	B	360 ± 10	Chamaeleon		A			
Alpha Herculis (Rasalgethi)	A	360	Hercules		M5 Ib-II	3.35		A triple star system consisting of an asymptotic giant branch star, a red giant, and a main sequence star.
Alpha Herculis (Rasalgethi)	B	360	Hercules		G8III			A triple star system consisting of an asymptotic giant branch star, a red giant, and a main sequence star.
Alpha Herculis (Rasalgethi)	C	360	Hercules		A9IV-V			A triple star system consisting of an asymptotic giant branch star, a red giant, and a main sequence star.
Kappa Ursae Majoris (Alkaphrah)	A	360 ± 20	Ursa Major		A0 IV-V	3.56		
Kappa Ursae Majoris (Alkaphrah)	B	360 ± 20	Ursa Major		A0 V			
Zeta Crucis		360 ± 20	Crux		B2.5V	4.04		
Rho Ophiuchi	A	360 ± 40	Ophiuchus		B2/3V	4.63		Member of Rho Ophiuchi cloud complex.
Rho Ophiuchi	B	360 ± 40	Ophiuchus		B2V			Member of Rho Ophiuchi cloud complex.
TOI-1438		361			K0V	4.71		Has two confirmed exoplanets (b,c).
K2-198		362			G			Has 3 exoplanets.
Zeta Canis Majoris (Furud)		362 ± 5	Canis Major		B2.5 V	3.025		
TOI-125		363			G			Has 3 confirmed and 2 unconfirmed exoplanets.
HD 212771 (Lionrock)		364 ± 1			G8 IV	7.6±0.01		
Mu² Crucis		364 ± 9	Crux		B5Vne	5.19		
Albireo (Beta¹ Cygni)	Aa	364.8+15.6 −15.3	Cygnus		K2II	3.21 + 5.85		
Albireo (Beta¹ Cygni)	Ab	364.8+15.6 −15.3	Cygnus		B8:p			
Lambda Aquarii (Hydor/Shatabhisha)		365 ± 10	Aquarius		M2.5 IIIa Fe–1	3.722		
Alpha Antliae		366 ± 6	Antlia		K4III	4.25		
PDS 70 (V1032 Centauri)		366.6 ± 0.8			K7	12		Has one confirmed exoplanet (PDS 70b).
J Centauri		367 ± 5	Centaurus		B3V	4.505		
Kappa Gruis		368 ± 6	Grus		K5 III	5.37		
Chi Pegasi		368 ± 9	Pegasus		M2+III	4.80		
HD 98219 (Hunahpú)		369.1 ± 1.0			K0III/IV	8.05		
Nu Fornacis		370 ± 10	Fornax		B9.5IIIspSi	4.69		
H Centauri	A	370 ± 10	Centaurus		B7V	5.163		
H Centauri	B	370 ± 10	Centaurus		B8.5V			
H Centauri	C	370 ± 10	Centaurus		B			
Sigma Hydrae (Minchir)		370 ± 10	Hydra		K2 III	4.48		
Nu Puppis (Pipit)		370 ± 10	Puppis		B8 III	3.173		
2 Equulei A (Lambda Equulei)		370 ± 10	Equuleus		F6V	7.41		
106 Aquarii		370 ± 10	Aquarius		B9V	5.244		
Xi Cancri (Nahn)		370 ± 20	Cancer		G9 III Fe-1 CH-0.5	5.15		
SR 12 (V2247 Ophiuchi)	A	370 ± 20	Ophiuchus		M3	13.09 to 13.53		
SR 12 (V2247 Ophiuchi)	B	370 ± 20	Ophiuchus		M8			
HD 110461		372			B9V			
WASP-166 (Filetdor)		373			F9V			Has one confirmed exoplanet (WASP-166B).
HD 203842		374 ± 8			F5 III			
HD 169142		375 ± 1			A9III/IVe	8.16		
HIP 11952		376.1			F2V-IV	9.85		Has 2 confirmed exoplanets.
Maia (20 Tauri)		380 ± 10	Taurus		B8III	3.87		Part of Pleiades Cluster (M45).
AR Scorpii	A	384 ± 2	Scorpius		M5			Considered to have qualities of both white dwarf stars and pulsars.
AR Scorpii	B	384 ± 2	Scorpius		D			Considered to have qualities of both white dwarf stars and pulsars.
Eta Geminorum (Propus)	Aa	380	Gemini		M2 IIIa	3.1 – 3.7 + 6.04		
Eta Geminorum (Propus)	Ab	380	Gemini		A			
Eta Geminorum (Propus)	B	380	Gemini		G0 III			
Beta Draconis (Rastaban)		380 ± 4	Hercules		G2Ib-IIa			
31 Lyncis (Alsciaukat)		380 ± 10	Lynx		K4+ III	+4.25		
2 Equulei B (Lambda Equulei)		381 ± 1	Equuleus		F3V	7.64		
Kappa Herculis (Marsic)		381 ± 6	Hercules		G7III	4.994		
Zeta Centauri (Leepwal)		382 ± 6	Centaurus		B2.5 IV	2.55		
Alpha Sagittae (Sham)		382 ± 8	Sagitta		G1 II	+4.38		
Kappa Serpentis (Gudja)		383 ± 7	Serpens		M0.5III	4.09		
Beta Lupi		383 ± 8	Lupus		B2 III	2.68		
Lambda Crucis		384 ± 9	Crux		B4 Vne	4.62		
HIP 65426 (Matza)		385			A			
HD 110956		385 ± 10			B2/3V			
Zeta² Antliae		386 ± 5	Antlia		A9 IV	5.91		
Zeta Capricorni		386 ± 10	Capricornus		G4Ib: Ba2			
EC 20058-5234 (QU Telescopii)		388 ± 3			DB2	15.03		
Gamma¹ Andromedae	A (Almach)$	390	Andromeda	02^{h} 03^{m} 53.95229^{s} +42° 19′ 47.0223″	K2+IIb	2.27#	8.30±1.04	Part of Gamma Andromedae system
2MASS J16281370-2431391		390			M1			
Beta Centauri (Hadar)	A	390 ± 20	Centaurus		B1 III	0.61		
Beta Centauri (Hadar)	B	390 ± 20	Centaurus		B1 III			
Beta Centauri (Hadar)	C	390 ± 20	Centaurus		B1V			
Beta Capricorni (Dabih)	A	390 ± 30	Capricornus		K0II			
Beta Capricorni (Dabih)	B	390 ± 30	Capricornus		B8V/A0III			
Alpha Trianguli Australis (Atria)		391 ± 7	Triangulum Australe		K2Ib-IIa	1.91		
Kepler-446		391			M4V			Has 3 exoplanets.
Lambda Herculis (Maasym)		393 ± 4	Hercules		K3.5III	4.41		
HD 181342 (Belel)		393.1 ± 0.9			K0 III	7.55		
HD 33142		394.3			G			Has 3 exoplanets.
Gamma Aquilae (Tarazed)		395 ± 8	Aquila		K3 II	2.712		
Albireo B (Beta² Cygni)		395.4+2.9 −3.3	Cygnus		B8Ve	5.11		
HD 32518 (Mago)		396.8 ± 0.8			K1 III	6.42±0.01		
TIC 88785435		398.2±0.8			K7V			Has one known exoplanet.
HD 102956 (Aniara)		399-401			G8IV			Has one confirmed exoplanet (HD 102956b/Isagel).
Nu Ursae Majoris (Alula Borealis)		399 ± 8	Ursa Major		K3 III	+3.490		
System	Star or (sub-) brown dwarf	Distance (ly)	Constellation	Coordinates: RA, Dec (Ep J2000, Eq J2000)	Stellar class	Apparent magnitude (V)	Parallax (mas)	Notes and additional references

== See also ==
- List of star systems within 300–350 light-years
- List of star systems within 400–450 light-years
