= Pisces–Eridanus stellar stream =

Stellar stream spanning from Eridanus to Pisces

Pisces–Eridanus stellar stream is a close stellar stream, between 80 and 226 parsecs away, and stretching 120° across the sky, an open cluster that was stretched apart by past gravitational interactions. By analysis of the highest mass member stars, it is estimated to be only 120 million years old, a similar age to the Pleiades.

According to a 2020 study, this stellar stream contains about 1400 stars moving together and has a mass of 770 M_{☉}.

== Stars ==
The stream includes at least 6 naked eye stars: Lambda Tauri at 3.5 magnitude, 148 parsec distance; Omicron Aquarii at 4.7 magnitude, 134 parsec distance; 106 Aquarii at 5.2 magnitude, 114 parsec distance; 108 Aquarii at 5.2 magnitude, 98 parsec distance; Tau1 Aquarii at 5.7 magnitude, 97 parsec distance; and Nu Fornacis at 4.7 magnitude and 114 parsec distance.

Members in the Stream
| Star | HD | HR | HIP | Constellation | App. mag (V) | Dist. (ly) | Class | Notes |
|---|---|---|---|---|---|---|---|---|
| λ Tauri | 25204 | 1239 | 18724 | Taurus | 3.47 | 480 | B3 V | Brightest member; binary |
| ν Fornacis | 12767 | 612 | 9677 | Fornax | 4.69 | 370 | B9... | |
| ο Aquarii | 209409 | 8402 | 108874 | Aquarius | 4.71 | 440 | B7 IVe | |
| 108 Aquarii | 223640 | 9031 | 117629 | Aquarius | 5.19 | 319 | A0... | Peculiar; closest member |
| 106 Aquarii | 222847 | 8998 | 117089 | Aquarius | 5.24 | 370 | B9 V | |
| τ^{1} Aquarii | 215766 | 8673 | 112542 | Aquarius | 5.66 | 355 | | |

== See also ==
- List of stellar streams
