= I Aquarii =

i Aquarii can refer to several different astronomical objects:

- i^{1} Aquarii (106 Aquarii), B-type main-sequence star
- i^{2} Aquarii (107 Aquarii), double star
- i^{3} Aquarii (108 Aquarii), α^{2} Canum Venaticorum variable star
