= G Carinae =

The Bayer designations g Carinae and G Carinae refer to separate stars:

- g Carinae (HD 80230), a red giant near the border of Vela
- G Carinae (HR 3643), a binary system near β Centauri
