= Q car =

Q car may refer to:

- Sleeper (car), a car that has high performance and an unassuming exterior
- Q Carinae, a star in the constellation Carina
- V337 Carinae, also designated q Carinae, a variable star in the constellation Carina
- Q-type Queens car (New York City Subway car)
