= HD 23753 =

Star in the constellation Taurus

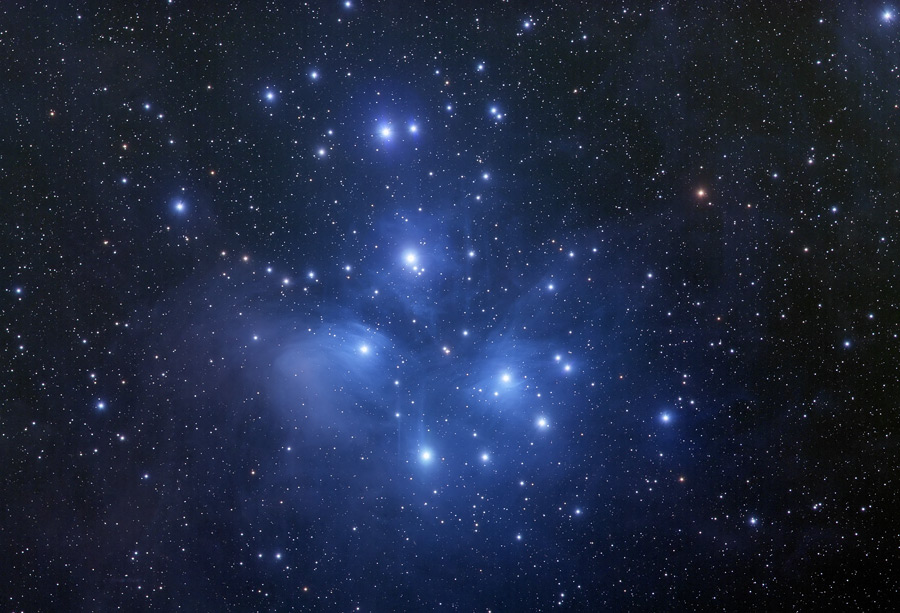
- HD 23753, circled in red, in a long exposure of the Pleiades

Observation data Epoch J2000 Equinox J2000
- Constellation: Taurus
- Right ascension: 03^{h} 48^{m} 20.81678^{s}
- Declination: +23° 25′ 16.4959″
- Apparent magnitude (V): 5.44

Characteristics
- Evolutionary stage: main sequence
- Spectral type: B9 Vn
- B−V color index: −0.067±0.008

Astrometry
Radial velocity (R_{v})	+7.6±0.5 km/s
Proper motion (μ)	RA: +19.695 mas/yr Dec.: −47.113 mas/yr
Parallax (π)	7.6909±0.0985 mas
Distance	424 ± 5 ly (130 ± 2 pc)
Absolute magnitude (M_{V})	0.00

Details
Mass	3.21±0.07 M_{☉}
Radius	2.7 R_{☉}
Luminosity	150.0+16.2 −14.8 L_{☉}
Surface gravity (log g)	4.09 cgs
Temperature	11,535+80 −79 K
Metallicity [Fe/H]	−0.57 dex
Rotation	0.6994 d
Rotational velocity (v sin i)	335 km/s
Age	125 Myr

Other designations
- NSV 1321, AAVSO 0343+23D, BD+22°563, HD 23753, HIP 17776, HR 1172, SAO 76215

Database references
SIMBAD	data

HD 23753 is a single star in the equatorial zodiac constellation of Taurus, and is a member of the Pleiades open cluster. It is dimly visible to the naked eye with an apparent visual magnitude of 5.44. The distance to this star, as determined from its annual parallax shift of 7.7 mas, is about 424 light years. It is moving further from the Earth with a heliocentric radial velocity of +8 km/s. The star is positioned near the ecliptic and so is subject to lunar occultations.

This is a B-type main-sequence star with a stellar classification of B9 Vn, where the 'n' indicates "nebulous" lines due to rapid rotation. It is 125 million years old with a projected rotational velocity of 335 km/s, completing a full revolution about its axis every 16.79 hours. HD 23753 has been catalogued as a suspected variable star with the designation NSV 1321, although the amplitude is no more than 0.1 magnitude and it may even be suitable for a photometric standard. Wraight et al. report that STEREO detected very shallow eclipses, with a period of 2.2663 days, during which the brightness falls by 1%.

HD 23753 has 3.21 times the mass of the Sun and 2.7 times the Sun's radius. It is radiating 150 times the Sun's luminosity from its photosphere at an effective temperature of 11,535 K.
