= WASP-15 =

Magnitude 11 star in the constellation Centaurus

WASP-15 / Nyamien
Observation data Epoch J2000 Equinox ICRS
- Constellation: Centaurus
- Right ascension: 13^{h} 55^{m} 42.7120^{s}
- Declination: −32° 09′ 34.616″
- Apparent magnitude (V): 10.91

Characteristics
- Evolutionary stage: main sequence
- Spectral type: F7
- Apparent magnitude (B): ~11.3
- Apparent magnitude (R): ~11.0
- Apparent magnitude (J): 9.956 ± 0.023
- Apparent magnitude (H): 9.713 ± 0.025
- Apparent magnitude (K): 9.693 ± 0.023

Astrometry
Radial velocity (R_{v})	−2.42±0.43 km/s
Proper motion (μ)	RA: 8.723 mas/yr Dec.: −22.328 mas/yr
Parallax (π)	3.4891±0.0176 mas
Distance	935 ± 5 ly (287 ± 1 pc)

Details
Mass	1.18±0.12 M_{☉}
Radius	1.477±0.072 R_{☉}
Luminosity	3.09±0.34 L_{☉}
Surface gravity (log g)	4.169±0.033 cgs
Temperature	6300±100 K
Metallicity [Fe/H]	−0.17±0.11 dex
Rotational velocity (v sin i)	4±2 km/s
Age	3.9+2.8 −1.3 Gyr

Other designations
- Nyamien, CD−31 10766, TOI-820, TIC 111991770, WASP-15, TYC 7283-1162-1, 2MASS J13554270-3209345

Database references
SIMBAD	data
Exoplanet Archive	data

WASP-15, also named Nyamien, is a magnitude 11 star located about 935 light-years away in the constellation Centaurus. The star, which is more massive, larger, hotter, and more luminous than the Sun, is also less metal-rich than the Sun. WASP-15 has one known planet in its orbit, WASP-15b; the planet is a hot Jupiter with an anomalously high radius, a phenomenon which may be explained by the presence of an internal heat source. The star was first observed by the SuperWASP program in 2006; future measurements in 2007 and 2008, as well as follow-up observations and analysis, eventually led to the discovery of WASP-15b using the transit method and Doppler spectroscopy.

== Observational history ==
WASP-15 was first observed from the South African Astronomical Observatory, which hosts the planet-searching SuperWASP program in the Southern Hemisphere (WASP-South), and was catalogued by its brightness and its coordinates in the sky. This information was captured first with one camera field between May 4, 2006 and July 17, 2006, and later again using two overlapping camera fields between January 31, 2007 to July 7, 2007 and from January 31, 2008 to May 29, 2008.

Data processing led to the acquisition of 24,943 data points that suggested that some body transited, or crossed in front of (and briefly dimmed), WASP-15 every 3.7520 days. Approximately eleven transits, full and partial, were observed. Use of the EulerCAM photometer at the La Silla Observatory's 1.2 m Leonhard Euler Telescope on March 29, 2008 provided further evidence for an exoplanet by better defining the transit's curve. Later, the CORALIE spectrograph (also on the Euler telescope) between March 6, 2008 and July 17, 2008 used Doppler spectroscopy to collect 21 radial velocity measurements. Analysis confirmed the presence of a planet that was later designated WASP-15b.

== Naming ==
WASP-15, and its planet WASP-15b, were chosen as part of the 2019 NameExoWorlds campaign organised by the International Astronomical Union, which assigned each country a star and planet to be named. WASP-15 was assigned to Ivory Coast. The winning proposal named the star Nyamien refers to the supreme creator deity of Akan mythology, and the planet Asye refers to the Earth goddess of Akan mythology.

== Characteristics ==
WASP-15 is an F-type star with a mass that is 1.18 times larger than the Sun, and a radius that is 1.477 bigger. It is, thus, larger, more massive, and more diffuse than the Sun. The star has an effective temperature of 6300 K, making it also hotter than the Sun. With a metallicity of [Fe/H] = -0.17, WASP-15 has 0.676 times the amount of iron than the Sun, and has consistently lower levels of other metals, including sodium, magnesium, silicon, calcium, and scandium. In addition, WASP-15 is most likely younger than the Sun, as it has an estimated age of 3.9 billion years. WASP-15 is approximately 3.09 times more luminous than the Sun.

WASP-15 is located at a distance of approximately 287 parsecs (940 light-years), and it has an estimated apparent magnitude of 10.9. It is, thus, not visible from Earth with the unaided eye.

== Planetary system ==
WASP-15 is host to the planet WASP-15b. The planet, which is a Hot Jupiter, orbits its host star at a distance of 0.0499 AU every 3.7520656 days. WASP-15b was noted by its discoverers because of its anomalously high radius, which is 1.428 times that of Jupiter, compared to its mass, which is 0.542 times the size of Jupiter. WASP-15b's large radius cannot be explained solely by its proximity to its star, suggesting that some form of tidal heating or other internal heating mechanism is also involved.

The WASP-15 planetary system
Companion (in order from star)	Mass	Semimajor axis (AU)	Orbital period (days)	Eccentricity	Inclination (°)	Radius
b / Asye	0.542+0.054 −0.053 M_{J}	0.0499+0.0017 −0.0018	3.75209748(81)	<0.055	85.5±0.5	1.428±0.077 R_{J}

== See also ==
- SuperWASP
- List of extrasolar planets
