= H Centauri =

Star in the constellation Centaurus

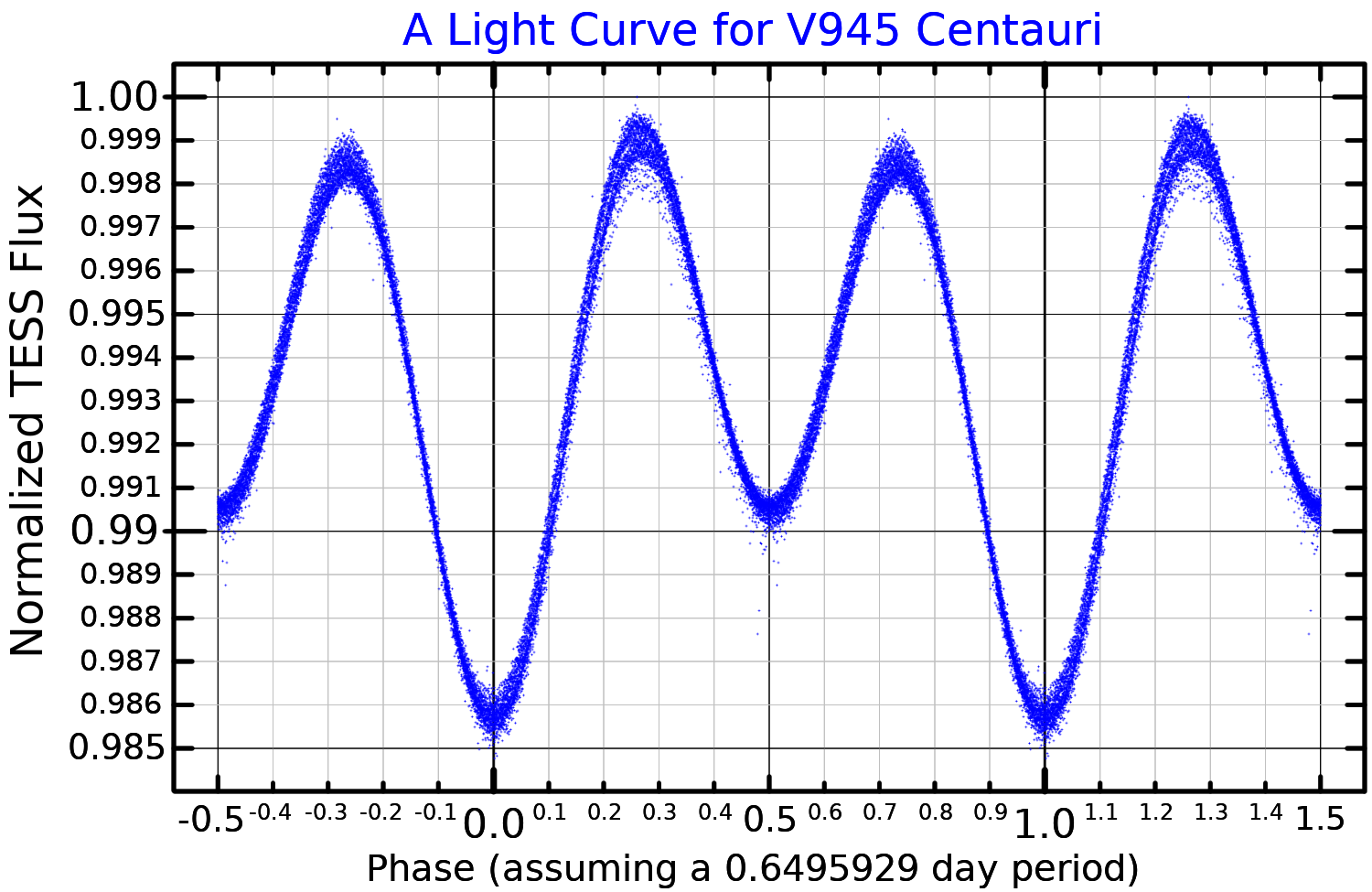
- A light curve for V945 Centauri, plotted from TESS data

Observation data Epoch J2000 Equinox ICRS
- Constellation: Centaurus
- Right ascension: 12^{h} 57^{m} 04.35244^{s}
- Declination: −51° 11′ 55.5058″
- Apparent magnitude (V): 5.16 to 5.18

Characteristics
- Spectral type: B7V + B8.5V + B
- Apparent magnitude (B): 5.102
- Apparent magnitude (V): 5.163
- Variable type: ellipsoidal variable

Astrometry
Radial velocity (R_{v})	14.55±1.6 km/s
Proper motion (μ)	RA: −30.15 mas/yr Dec.: −14.61 mas/yr
Parallax (π)	8.85±0.27 mas
Distance	370 ± 10 ly (113 ± 3 pc)

Details

Primary
Mass	3.32±0.51 M_{☉}
Radius	2.09±0.12 R_{☉}
Luminosity	111±21 L_{☉}
Surface gravity (log g)	4.3±0.1 cgs
Temperature	13,000 K

Secondary
Mass	2.37±0.48 M_{☉}
Radius	1.67±0.09 R_{☉}
Luminosity	37±7 L_{☉}
Surface gravity (log g)	4.4±0.1 cgs
Temperature	10,687±52 K

Other designations
- H Centauri, V945 Centauri, CD−50 7394, CPD−50 5596, CPC 0 10830, GC 17569, GCRV 7736, GSC 08258-01469, HD 112409, HIC 63210, HIP 63210, HR 4913, PPM 341451, SAO 240407

Database references
SIMBAD	data

H Centauri (H Cen), also known as V945 Centauri, is probable triple star system located in the constellation Centaurus. From parallax measurements, it is located 113 parsecs (370 light years) from the Sun. It is a member of the Lower Centaurus–Crux (LCC) subgroup of the Scorpius–Centaurus association. It is faintly visible to the naked eye under good observing conditions.

H Centauri was discovered to be a variable star when the Hipparcos data was analyzed. It was given its variable star designation, V945 Centauri, in 1999. This system is a double-lined spectroscopic binary formed by two B-type main-sequence star with spectral types B7V and B8.5V. They are in a close (but detached) circular orbit with a period of 0.6496 days and a separation of 5.63 solar radii. Observed at an inclination of 24°, the system is an ellipsoidal variable whose apparent visual magnitude varies from 5.14 to 5.18 over the course of an orbit as the star's visible surface area changes. The system's spectrum contains a third set of spectral lines that are probably from a third star, also of type B.
