= WASP-11b =

Extrasolar planet in the constellation Aries

WASP-11b/HAT-P-10b
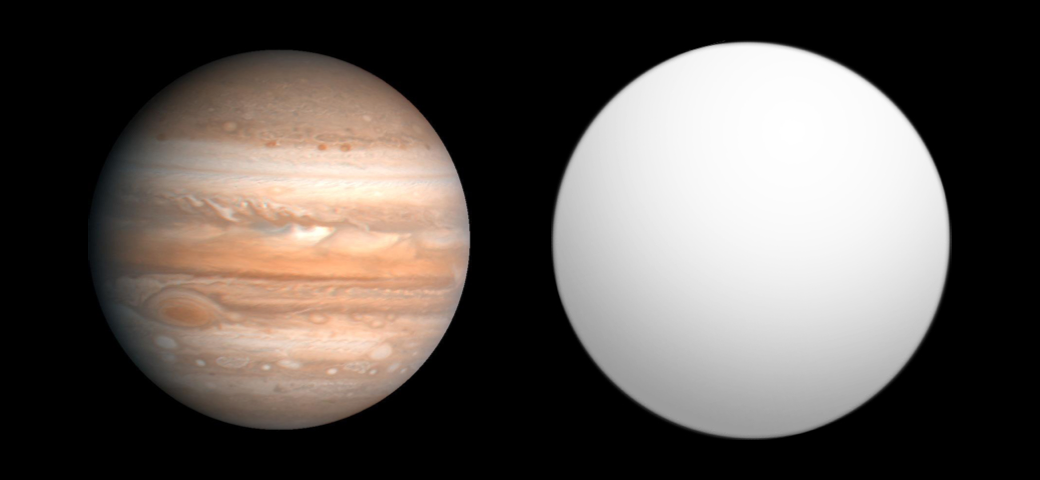
- Size comparison of WASP-11b/HAT-P-10b with Jupiter.

Discovery
- Discovered by: West et al. (SuperWASP); Bakos et al. (HATNet)
- Discovery site: SAAO
- Discovery date: April 1, 2008 (announced); September 26, 2008 (preprints)
- Detection method: Transit

Orbital characteristics
- Semi-major axis: 0.0439^{+0.0006}_{−0.0009} AU
- Eccentricity: 0
- Orbital period (sidereal): 3.7224690 ± 0.0000067 d
- Inclination: 88.5 ± 0.6
- Semi-amplitude: 69.1 ± 3.5
- Star: WASP-11/HAT-P-10

Physical characteristics
- Mean radius: 1.045^{+0.050}_{−0.033} R_{J}
- Mass: 0.460 ± 0.028 M_{J}
- Mean density: 0.498 ± 0.064 g/cm^{3}
- Surface gravity: 10.5 m/s^{2} (34 ft/s^{2})
- Temperature: 1030^{+26}_{−19} (Note: Assumes the planet has zero albedo. Its secondary transit of the planet behind its star has not yet been observed and so the temperature provided is a hypothetical "equilibrium temperature".)

WASP-11b/HAT-P-10b or WASP-11Ab/HAT-P-10Ab is an extrasolar planet discovered in 2008. The discovery was announced (under the designation WASP-11b) by press release by the SuperWASP project in April 2008 along with planets WASP-6b through to WASP-15b, however at this stage more data was needed to confirm the parameters of the planets and the coordinates were not given. On 26 September 2008, the HATNet Project's paper describing the planet which they designated HAT-P-10b appeared on the arXiv preprint server. The SuperWASP team's paper appeared as a preprint on the Extrasolar Planets Encyclopaedia on the same day, confirming that the two objects (WASP-11b and HAT-P-10b) were in fact the same, and the teams agreed to use the combined designation.

The planet had the third lowest insolation of the known transiting planets at the time of the discovery (prior to this, Gliese 436 b and HD 17156 b were known to have lower insolation). The temperature implies it falls into the pL class of hot Jupiters: planets which lack significant quantities of titanium(II) oxide and vanadium(II) oxide in their atmospheres and do not have temperature inversions. An alternative classification system for hot Jupiters is based on the equilibrium temperature and the planet's Safronov number. (Note: The Safronov number is defined as $\textstyle \Theta = \frac{1}{2} \left(\frac{\mathrm{Planetary\ escape\ velocity}}{\mathrm{Orbital\ velocity}}\right)^2$) In this scheme, for a given temperature, class I planets have high Safronov numbers and tend to be in orbit around cooler host stars, while class II planets have lower Safronov numbers. In the case of WASP-11b/HAT-P-10b, the equilibrium temperature is 1030 K and the Safronov number is 0.047±0.003, which means it is located close to the dividing line between the class I and class II planets.

The planet is in a binary star system, the second star is WASP-11 B, with a mass 0.34 ± 0.05 of the Sun and a temperature of 3483 ± 43 K.

== See also ==
- OGLE-TR-111b
