= 2 Equulei =

Double star system in the constellation Equuleus

Observation data Epoch J2000.0 Equinox ICRS
Constellation	Equuleus
- A
Right ascension	21^{h} 02^{m} 12.50262^{s}
Declination	+07° 10′ 47.1545″
- Apparent magnitude (V): 7.41
- B
Right ascension	21^{h} 02^{m} 12.39375^{s}
Declination	+07° 10′ 44.7957″
- Apparent magnitude (V): 7.64

Characteristics

A
- Evolutionary stage: subgiant
- Spectral type: F6V

B
- Evolutionary stage: subgiant
- Spectral type: F3V

Astrometry
Radial velocity (R_{v})	−4.8±1.6 km/s
Absolute magnitude (M_{V})	2.16±0.18

A
Proper motion (μ)	RA: −9.184 mas/yr Dec.: −12.915 mas/yr
Parallax (π)	8.8125±0.2481 mas
Distance	370 ± 10 ly (113 ± 3 pc)

B
Proper motion (μ)	RA: −4.238 mas/yr Dec.: −17.934 mas/yr
Parallax (π)	8.5577±0.0298 mas
Distance	381 ± 1 ly (116.9 ± 0.4 pc)

Details

2 Equ A
Mass	1.73 M_{☉}
Radius	2.6 R_{☉}
Luminosity	12.9 L_{☉}
Surface gravity (log g)	3.84 cgs
Temperature	6,127 K
Metallicity [Fe/H]	0.17 dex
Age	1.9 Gyr

2 Equ B
Mass	1.61 M_{☉}
Radius	2.8 R_{☉}
Luminosity	10.9 L_{☉}
Surface gravity (log g)	3.72 cgs
Temperature	6,420 K
Age	2.2 Gyr

Other designations
- λ Equ, 2 Equulei, BD+06°4731, HD 200256, HIP 103813, LTT 16227, SAO 126482

Database references
SIMBAD	data

2 Equulei is a double star system in the constellation of Equuleus.

The primary component of the 2 Equulei pair is an F-type star. As of 2015, the secondary had an angular separation of 2.90 arc seconds along a position angle of 213° from the primary. They form a common proper motion pair, two stars at approximately the same distance and moving in the same direction. Gaia DR3 gives them parallaxes of 8.8125±0.2471 mas and 8.5577±0.0298 mas respectively, although they are flagged as potentially unreliable. These parallaxes correspond to a distance of around 380 ly, in contrast to the Hipparcos distance of 260±20 ly for the two stars as a pair.

2 Equulei has been referred to in some sources as λ (Lambda) Equulei, although it was not given that designation by Bayer.
