= HD 187420/187421 =

Binary star in the constellation Telescopium

- Location of HD 187420 and 187421 (circled)

Observation data Epoch J2000.0 Equinox J2000.0 (ICRS)
Constellation	Telescopium
- HD 187420
Right ascension	19^{h} 52^{m} 37.72117^{s}
Declination	−54° 58′ 15.6700″
- Apparent magnitude (V): 5.71±0.01
- HD 187421
Right ascension	19^{h} 52^{m} 39.13201^{s}
Declination	−54° 58′ 35.1997″
- Apparent magnitude (V): 6.37±0.01

Characteristics

HD 187420
- Spectral type: G8/K0 III
- U−B color index: +0.67
- B−V color index: +0.92

HD 187421
- Spectral type: A1/3 V
- U−B color index: +0.13
- B−V color index: +0.10

Astrometry

HD 187420
Radial velocity (R_{v})	−17.9±1.2 km/s
Proper motion (μ)	RA: +18.630 mas/yr Dec.: +3.076 mas/yr
Parallax (π)	8.0046±0.0705 mas
Distance	407 ± 4 ly (125 ± 1 pc)
Absolute magnitude (M_{V})	−0.33

HD 187421
Radial velocity (R_{v})	−21.5±1.9 km/s
Proper motion (μ)	RA: +19.549 mas/yr Dec.: +2.252 mas/yr
Parallax (π)	7.8714 ± 0.037 mas
Distance	414 ± 2 ly (127.0 ± 0.6 pc)
Absolute magnitude (M_{V})	+2.69

Details

HD 187420
Mass	3.00±0.04 M_{☉}
Radius	11.6±0.6 R_{☉}
Luminosity	88.3^{+1.4}_{−1.5} L_{☉}
Surface gravity (log g)	2.59 cgs
Temperature	5,140±122 K
Metallicity [Fe/H]	−0.17 dex
Rotational velocity (v sin i)	2.4±1.2 km/s
Age	377±37 Myr

HD 187421
Mass	2.31 M_{☉}
Radius	2.72±0.14 R_{☉}
Luminosity	37.1^{+2.4}_{−2.0} L_{☉}
Surface gravity (log g)	3.92 cgs
Temperature	9,099±309 K
Metallicity [Fe/H]	+0.20 dex
Rotational velocity (v sin i)	170±2 km/s
Age	560 Myr

Other designations
- HD 187420: 71 G. Telescopii, CD−55°8312, CPD−55°9221, GC 27482, HD 187420, HIP 97816, HR 7548, SAO 246311, CCDM J19526-5458A, WDS J19526-5458A
- HD 187421: 72 G. Telescopii, CD−55°8313, CPD−55°9222, GC 27483, HD 187421, HIP 97819, HR 7549, SAO 246312, CCDM J19526-5458B, WDS J19526-5458B

Database references
SIMBAD	HD 187420
- HD 187421

HD 187420 (HR 7548; 71 G. Telescopii) and HD 187421 (HR 7549; 72 G. Telescopii), are the components of a binary star located in the southern constellation Telescopium. Gaia DR3 parallax measurements place the stars at a distance of 407 and 414 light years respectively. The two are separated by 23″, and they are approaching the Solar System with heliocentric radial velocities of −17.9 km/s and −21.5 km/s respectively.

== The system ==
HD 187420 is the primary of the system. It has an apparent magnitude of 5.71, making it faintly visible to the naked eye as a yellowish-orange-hued star. However, its brightness is diminished by 0.17 magnitudes due to interstellar dust. Meanwhile, the secondary HD 187421 has an apparent magnitude of 6.37, placing it near the limit for naked eye visibility. It too suffers from extinction, which makes it 0.25 magnitudes dimmer. The stars have absolute magnitudes of −0.33 and +2.69 respectively. HD 187421 is located 23.5" away from HD 187420 along a position angle of 148° as of 2016. They were first observed as a double star in 1826 by astronomer James Dunlap.

== HD 187420 ==
HD 187420 has a stellar classification of G8/K0 III, indicating that it is an evolved star with the characteristics of a G8 and K0 giant star. It has 3 times the mass of the Sun but at the age of 377 million years, it has expanded to 11.6 times the radius of the Sun. It radiates 88.3 times the luminosity of the Sun from its photosphere at an effective temperature of 5,140 K. HD 187420 is metal deficient at [Fe/H] = −0.17 and spins modestly with a projected rotational velocity of 2.4 km/s.

== HD 187421 ==
HD 187421 is an A-type star with the characteristics of an A1 and A3 main sequence star, which corresponds to a classification of A1/3 V. It has 2.31 times the mass of the Sun and 2.72 times the Sun's radius. It radiates 37.1 times the luminosity of the Sun from its photosphere at an effective temperature of 9,099 K, giving it a white hue. HD 187421 is particularly metal enriched at [Fe/H] = +0.2 and is estimated to be 560 million years old. Like many hot stars it spins rapidly, having a projected rotational velocity of 170 km/s.
