= FU Tauri =

Star in the constellation Taurus

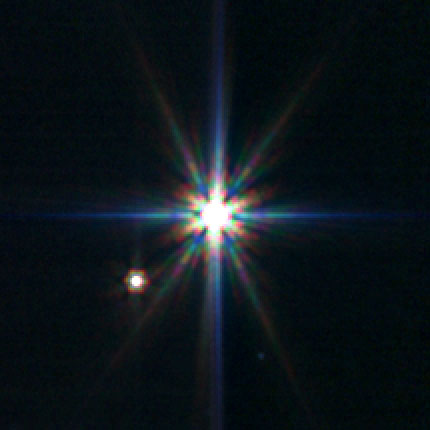
- FU Tauri and its companion (lower left); Credit: Image Credit: NASA/ESA/CSA JWST; Ya-Lin Wu et al.; processing: Meli_thev

Observation data Epoch J2000 Equinox ICRS
- Constellation: Taurus
- A
- Right ascension: 04^{h} 23^{m} 35.391^{s}
- Declination: +25° 03′ 02.75″
- B
- Right ascension: 04^{h} 23^{m} 35.746^{s}
- Declination: +25° 02′ 59.64″

Characteristics

A
- Evolutionary stage: pre-main sequence
- Spectral type: M7.25
- Apparent magnitude (G): 15.23 + 20.45
- Variable type: T Tau

B
- Evolutionary stage: brown dwarf
- Spectral type: M9.25
- Apparent magnitude (G): 20.45

Astrometry

A
Radial velocity (R_{v})	+19.67±0.01 km/s
Proper motion (μ)	RA: +6.901 mas/yr Dec.: −21.252 mas/yr
Parallax (π)	7.8354±0.0754 mas
Distance	416 ± 4 ly (128 ± 1 pc)

B
Proper motion (μ)	RA: +1.5 mas/yr Dec.: −24.2 mas/yr
Parallax (π)	7.4750±1.1221 mas
Distance	approx. 440 ly (approx. 130 pc)

Details

A
Mass	0.05 M_{☉}
Luminosity	0.2 L_{☉}
Rotation	3.93±0.10 days
Rotational velocity (v sin i)	17.4±0.3 km/s
Age	<1 Myr

B
Mass	0.015 M_{☉}
Luminosity	0.039 L_{☉}
Age	<1 Myr

Other designations
- WDS J04236+2503A, 2MASS J04233539+2503026, Gaia DR2 149629483705467008

Database references
SIMBAD	A
- B

FU Tauri is a binary brown dwarf in the constellation of Taurus. Based on parallax measurements, it is about 416 light years away.

== Variability ==
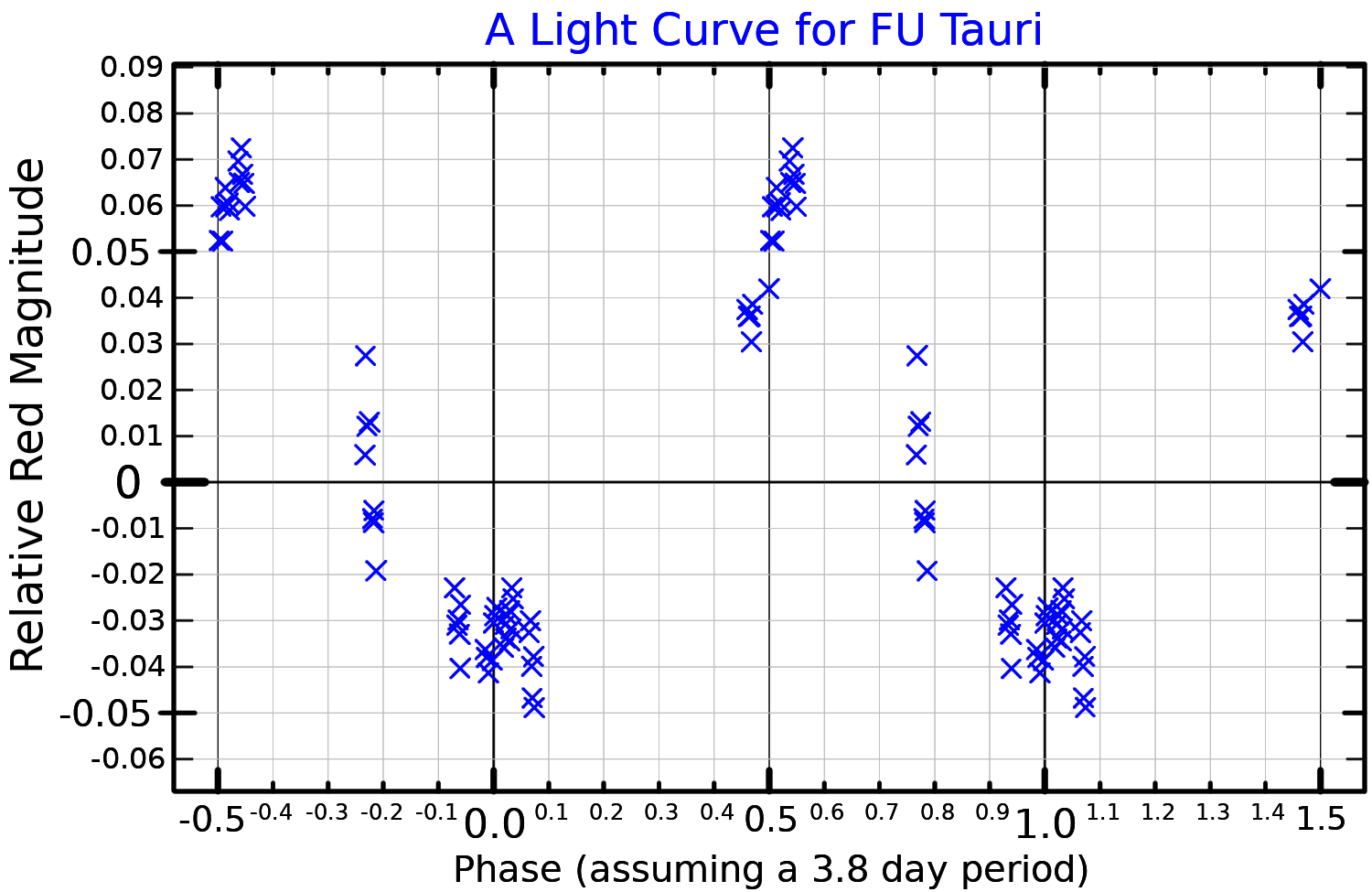
A red band light curve for FU Tauri, adapted from Scholz et al. (2012)

FU Tauri varies in brightness. The primary is a T Tauri variable, a type of irregular pre-main-sequence star. Its brightness has been observed to vary from a photovisual magnitude of 16.0 to fainter than 17.0. Its photographic magnitude has been measured to vary between magnitude 15.1 and below magnitude 17.6.

== Characteristics ==
The primary and secondary, FU Tauri A and B, have spectral types of M7.25 and M9.25, which are suggestive of masses of 0.05 and 0.015 solar masses (M_{☉}). The system is very young, only ~1 million years old. Both brown dwarfs have infrared emission that indicates the presence of circumstellar disks. The binary system has a projected separation of 5.7″, which is equivalent to a projected separation of 800 AU at the system's distance.
