= HK Tauri =

Young binary star system in the constellation of Taurus

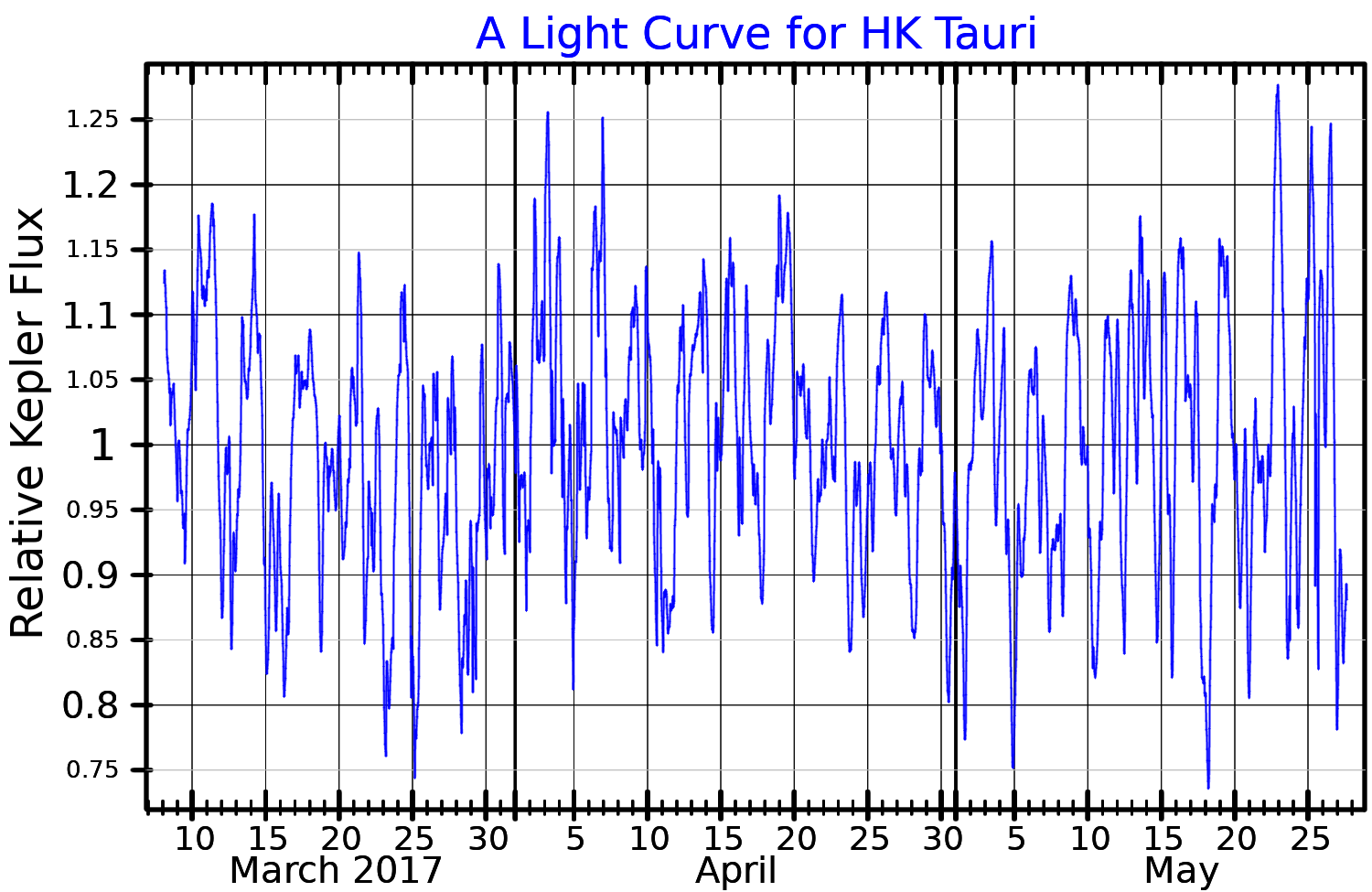
- A light curve for HK Tauri, adapted from Roggero et al. (2021)

Observation data Epoch J2000 Equinox J2000
Constellation	Taurus
- A
Right ascension	04^{h} 31^{m} 50.5716^{s}
Declination	+24° 24′ 17.775″
- Apparent magnitude (V): 15.10
- B
Right ascension	04^{h} 31^{m} 50.6002^{s}
Declination	+24° 24′ 15.503″

Characteristics

HK Tauri A
- Evolutionary stage: pre-main-sequence star
- Spectral type: M1.5
- Apparent magnitude (G): 14.106
- Variable type: T Tau

HK Tauri B
- Spectral type: M2
- Apparent magnitude (G): 17.962

Astrometry

HK Tauri A
Proper motion (μ)	RA: 5.076 mas/yr Dec.: −22.944 mas/yr
Parallax (π)	7.6247±0.0317 mas
Distance	428 ± 2 ly (131.2 ± 0.5 pc)

HK Tauri B
Proper motion (μ)	RA: 2.668 mas/yr Dec.: −20.457 mas/yr
Parallax (π)	7.780±0.6322 mas
Distance	420 ± 30 ly (130 ± 10 pc)

Position (relative to HK Tauri A)
Component	HK Tauri B
Angular distance	2.32″
Position angle	170.4°
Projected separation	309 AU

Details

A
Mass	0.44^{+0.14}_{−0.11} M_{☉}
Luminosity	0.56 L_{☉}
Temperature	3680±150 K

B
Mass	0.37±0.2 M_{☉}
Luminosity	0.42 L_{☉}
Temperature	3550±150 K

Other designations
- 2MASS J04315056+2424180, WISE J043150.56+242417.6
- HK Tauri A: Gaia EDR3 147847072275324416, Gaia DR2 147847072275324416
- HK Tauri B: Gaia EDR3 147847072275766656, Gaia DR2 147847072274696704

Database references
SIMBAD	data

HK Tauri is a young binary star system in the constellation of Taurus about 434 light-years away, belonging to the Taurus Molecular Cloud.

== System ==
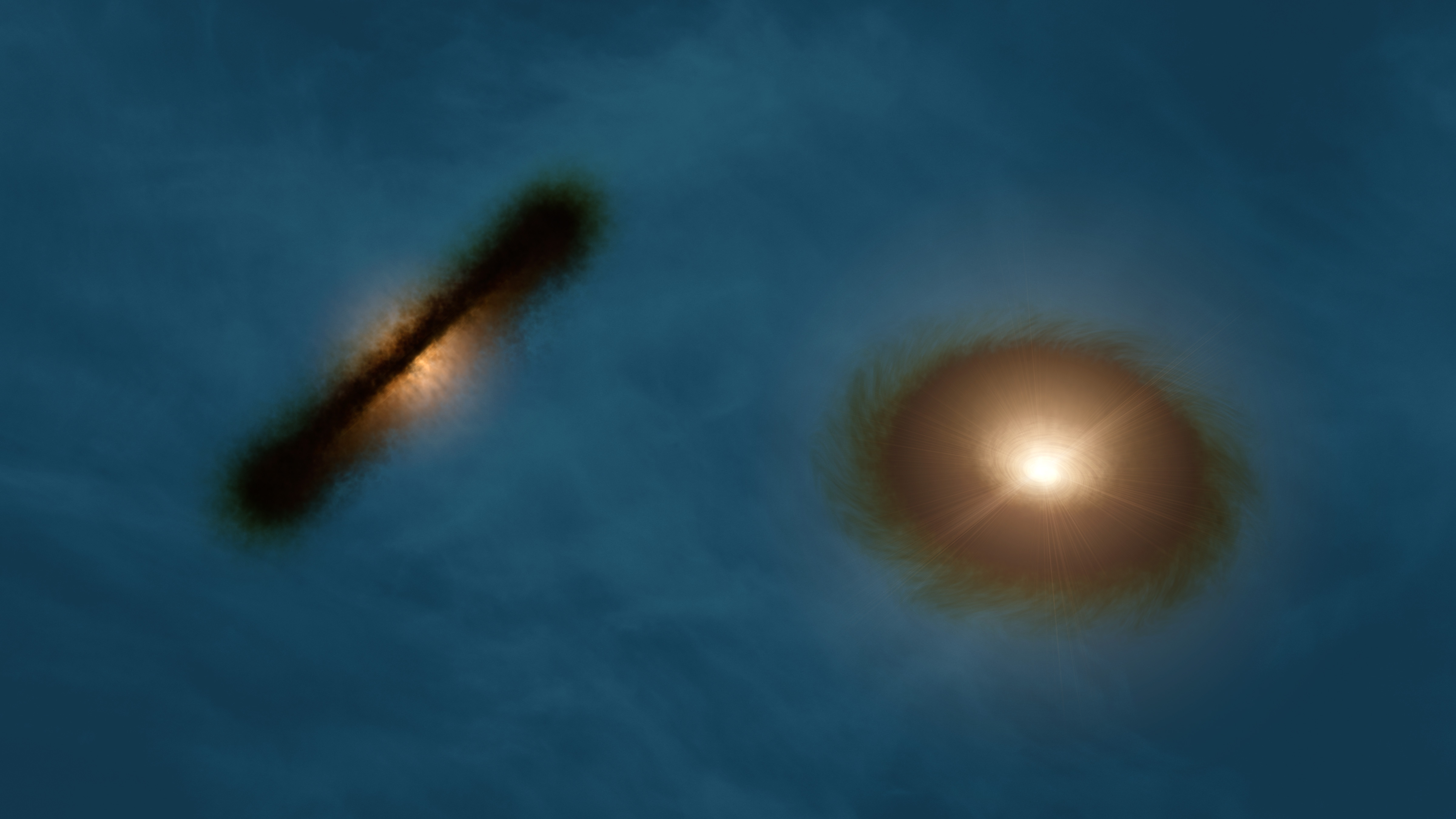
Artist's impressions of the two disks surrounding both stars

The two stars of the HK Tauri system are separated by 2.32″, equivalent to 309 AU at the distance of HK Tauri. The primary is a pre-main sequence star with a mass of 0.44 M_{☉}, while the secondary has a mass of 0.37 M_{☉}.

== Properties ==
Both members of the binary are medium-mass objects still contracting towards the main sequence and accreting mass. Their ages are probably young (below 10 million years) but cannot be estimated with any accuracy because both stars are strongly obscured by the protoplanetary disks.

== Protoplanetary system ==
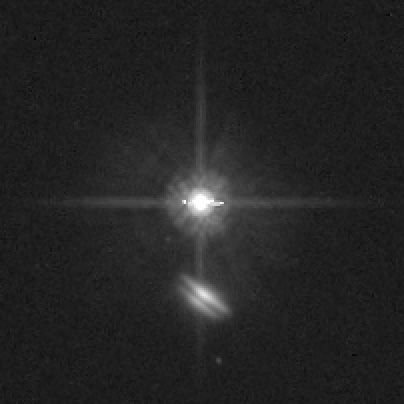
HK Tauri, with the edge-on disk around the B component with Hubble

The companion star HK Tauri B is surrounded by a protoplanetary disk visible nearly edge-on. It contains water and carbon dioxide ices, along with gaseous carbon monoxide. The disk is unusually flat, with an aspect ratio of 4.4, while most young stars host disks with aspect ratios of about 3. The disk also contain relatively few large dust particles compared to fine dust, with a size distribution power-law slope of 4.2. The disk mass is relatively small, not larger than 0.0005M_{☉}, and dust distribution is asymmetric. The plane of the disk is not aligned with the orbit of the binary.

Multiple planets embedded in the disk of HK Tauri B have been suspected since 1993, although none were detected by 2020.

The HK Tauri A planetary system
Companion (in order from star)	Mass	Semimajor axis (AU)	Orbital period (days)	Eccentricity	Inclination	Radius
protoplanetary disk	0–28.7 AU				56.9±0.5°	—

The HK Tauri B planetary system
Companion (in order from star)	Mass	Semimajor axis (AU)	Orbital period (days)	Eccentricity	Inclination	Radius
protoplanetary disk	0–68.0 AU				83.2±0.2°	—
