= HD 136138 =

Star in the constellation Serpens

Observation data Epoch J2000.0 Equinox ICRS
- Constellation: Serpens
- Right ascension: 15^{h} 18^{m} 24.507^{s}
- Declination: +20° 34′ 21.95″
- Apparent magnitude (V): 5.68 + 15.3

Characteristics
- Evolutionary stage: Horizontal branch + white dwarf
- Spectral type: G8IIIa + DA1.7
- B−V color index: 0.972±0.004
- Variable type: Constant

Astrometry
Radial velocity (R_{v})	−7.74±0.07 km/s
Proper motion (μ)	RA: −12.993 mas/yr Dec.: −22.380 mas/yr
Parallax (π)	7.7902±0.2193 mas
Distance	420 ± 10 ly (128 ± 4 pc)
Absolute magnitude (M_{V})	0.65±0.15

Orbit
Period (P)	506.45±0.18 d
Semi-major axis (a)	4.14±0.52" (≥ 41.76±0.34 Gm)
Eccentricity (e)	0.3353±0.0056
Inclination (i)	42.9±6.7°
Longitude of the node (Ω)	207.0±7.4°
Periastron epoch (T)	2,453,240.3±1.3 MJD
Argument of periastron (ω) (secondary)	35.0±1.4°
Semi-amplitude (K_{1}) (primary)	6.340±0.044 km/s

Details

A
Mass	1.84±0.40 M_{☉}
Radius	10.3 R_{☉}
Luminosity	56.2 L_{☉}
Surface gravity (log g)	2.68 cgs
Temperature	4,960±100 K
Metallicity [Fe/H]	−0.08±0.09 dex
Age	1.45 Gyr

B
Mass	0.59±0.12 or 0.79±0.09 M_{☉}
Surface gravity (log g)	8.25±0.15 cgs
Temperature	30,400±780 K

Other designations
- BD+21°2755, FK5 1400, GC 20575, HD 136138, HIP 74896, HR 5692, SAO 83755, WD 1516+207

Database references
SIMBAD	data

HD 136138, or HR 5692, is a binary star system in the Serpens Caput segment of the constellation Serpens. It has a golden hue like the Sun and is dimly visible to the naked eye with an apparent visual magnitude of 5.68; the light contribution from the companion is effectively negligible. This system is located at a distance of approximately 420 light years from the Sun based on parallax. It is drifting closer with a radial velocity of −7.7 km/s and has a proper motion of 23.5 mas·yr^{−1}.

The radial velocity variation of this star was reported by J. R. de Medeiros and M. Mayor in 1999, and it was confirmed as a binary by A. Frankowski and colleagues in 2007 using proper motion measurements. It is an unresolved, single-lined spectroscopic binary system with an orbital period of 1.39 years and an eccentricity (ovalness) of 0.335. Proper motion measurements allow an estimate of the orbital inclination angle as ~43°. Their semimajor axis is around 2.0 AU, or double the distance from the Earth to the Sun.

The stellar classification of the primary component is G8IIIa, indicating this is a evolved G-type giant star that has exhausted the supply of hydrogen at its core. It is a red clump giant that is generating energy through core helium fusion. There is some ambiguous evidence for this being a mild barium star of class Ba0.3, with the spectra showing marginal overabundances of s-process elements. A low level of X-ray emission has been detected, which appears to be coming from the star's corona.

The high level of ultraviolet flux coming from this system strongly suggests the companion is a compact white dwarf. Mass estimates put it in the range of 0.6 to 0.8 times the mass of the Sun, and the temperature is around 30,400 K. It is possible that the earlier evolution of this component contaminated its partner with s-process elements, although the resulting interaction should have circularized the orbit to some degree. The dwarf has a visual magnitude of 15.3 and a hydrogen-dominated atmospheric class of DA1.7.
