= Omicron Aquarii =

Variable B-type star in the constellation Aquarius

- Location of ο Aquarii (circled)

Observation data Epoch J2000 Equinox ICRS
- Constellation: Aquarius
- Right ascension: 22^{h} 03^{m} 18.844^{s}
- Declination: −02° 09′ 19.31″
- Apparent magnitude (V): +4.71

Characteristics
- Evolutionary stage: main sequence
- Spectral type: B5V
- U−B color index: −0.39
- B−V color index: −0.11
- Variable type: γ Cas

Astrometry
Radial velocity (R_{v})	+11.0 km/s
Proper motion (μ)	RA: +24.593 mas/yr Dec.: −11.720 mas/yr
Parallax (π)	6.9984±0.1424 mas
Distance	466 ± 9 ly (143 ± 3 pc)
Absolute magnitude (M_{V})	−0.89

Details
Mass	4.2 M_{☉}
Radius	4.0±0.3 R_{☉}
Luminosity	644 L_{☉}
Surface gravity (log g)	3.51 cgs
Temperature	11,145±498 K
Metallicity [Fe/H]	−0.16 dex
Rotational velocity (v sin i)	211±26 km/s

Other designations
- ο Aqr, 31 Aquarii, BD−02 5681, FK5 3765, HD 209409, HIP 108874, HR 8402, SAO 145837

Database references
SIMBAD	data

Omicron Aquarii is a variable star in the equatorial constellation of Aquarius. Its name is a Bayer designation that is Latinized from ο Aquarii, and abbreviated Omicron Aqr or ο Aqr. Visible to the naked eye, it has an apparent visual magnitude of +4.71. Parallax measurements put it at a distance of roughly 466 light-years (143 parsecs) from Earth. It is drifting further away with a radial velocity of +11 km/s. The star is a candidate member of the Pisces-Eridanus stellar stream of co-moving stars.

It has the traditional star name Kae Uh, from the Chinese 蓋屋 (Mandarin pronunciation Gài Wū). In Chinese astronomy, 蓋屋 is the rooftop, an asterism consisting of ο Aquarii and 32 Aquarii. Consequently, the Chinese name for ο Aquarii itself is 蓋屋一 (Gài Wū yī, English: the First Star of Roofing.)

== Properties ==
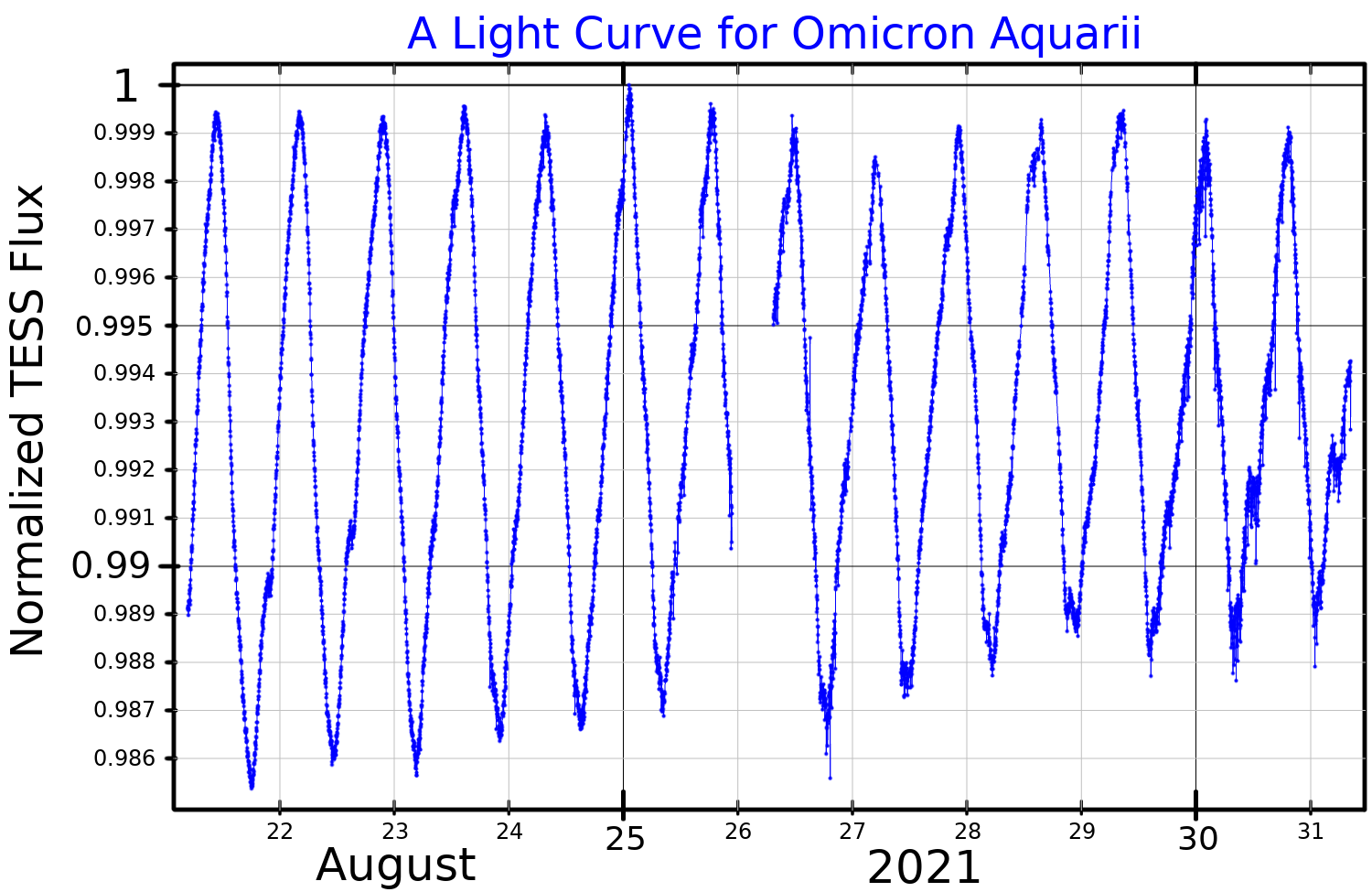
A light curve for Omicron Aquarii, plotted from TESS data

The spectrum of Omicron Aquarii fits a stellar classification of B5V, indicating that this is a main sequence star.

Omicron Aquarii has 4.2 times the mass of the Sun and four times the Sun's radius. It is radiating 644 times the luminosity of the Sun from its photosphere at an effective temperature of 11,145 K. This is classified as a Gamma Cassiopeiae type variable star and its brightness varies from magnitude +4.68 down to +4.89. It is likely a single star, with no stellar companions.

This star is spinning rapidly with an equatorial rotational velocity of 368 km/s, which is ~96% of the star's critical rotation velocity of 391 km/s. This is creating an equatorial bulge with a radius of 6.8±1.0 R_{☉} compared to a polar radius of 6.0±0.8 R_{☉}. As a result, the polar temperature 11,500±578 K; higher than the equator.

The emission lines are being generated by a decreted circumstellar disk of hot hydrogen gas. This disk has been globally stable for at least twenty years, as of 2020. It is inclined at an angle of 75°±3° to the plane of the sky. 90% of the hydrogen emission comes from within 9.5 stellar radii of the host star, and the disk has an estimated mass of ∼1.8×10^{−10} of the star's mass.
