= 108 Aquarii =

Star in the constellation Aquarius

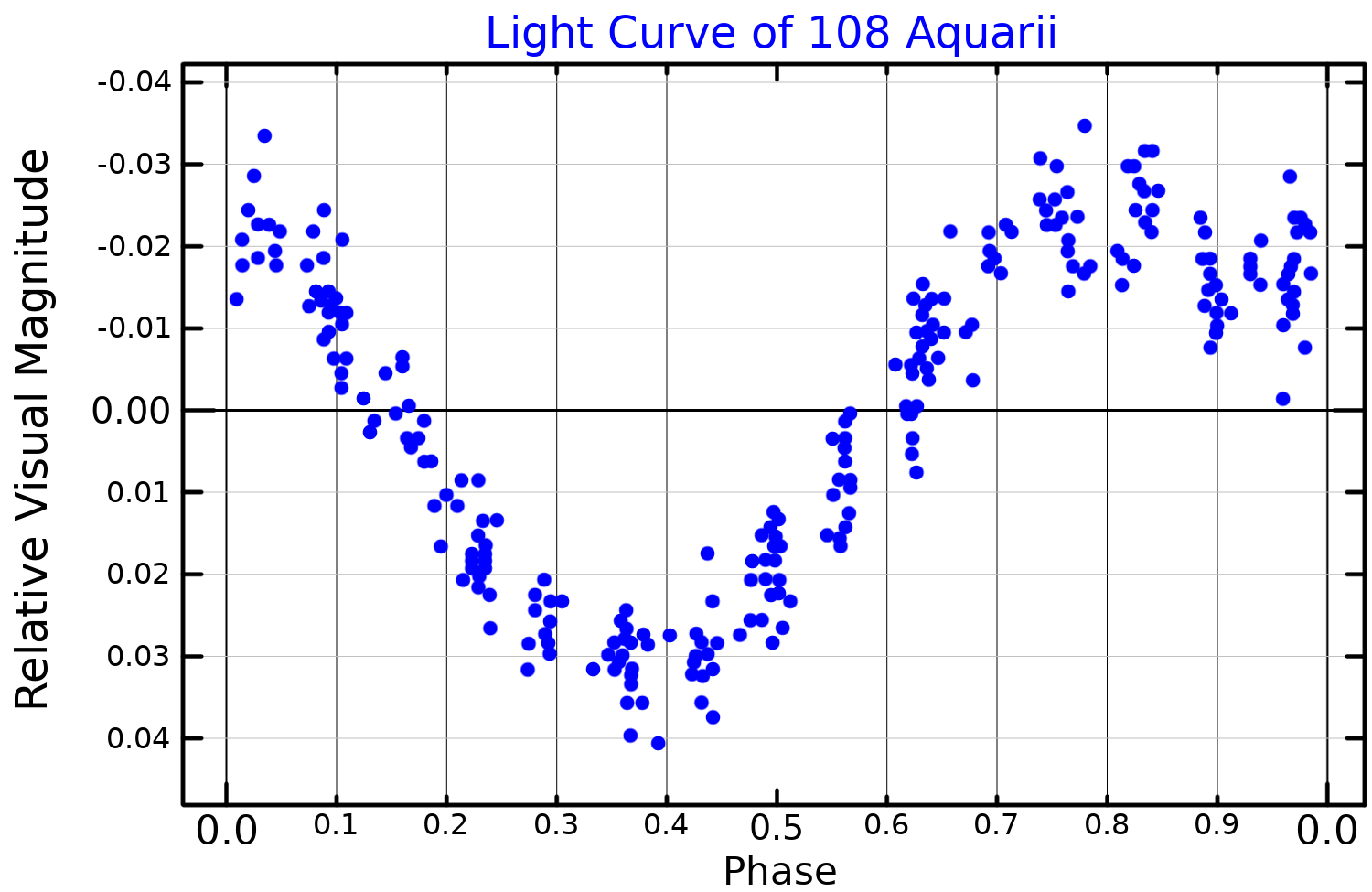
- The visual band light curve of 108 Aquarii, showing the variation over the star's 3.7352 day rotation period. Adapted from Adelman (1999)

Observation data Epoch J2000 Equinox ICRS
- Constellation: Aquarius
- Right ascension: 23^{h} 51^{m} 21.33832^{s}
- Declination: −18° 54′ 32.9937″
- Apparent magnitude (V): 5.194

Characteristics
- Spectral type: A0VpSiSr
- U−B color index: −0.396
- B−V color index: −0.135
- Variable type: α² CVn

Astrometry
Radial velocity (R_{v})	16.76±0.99 km/s
Proper motion (μ)	RA: +26.82 mas/yr Dec.: −4.27 mas/yr
Parallax (π)	10.23±0.31 mas
Distance	319 ± 10 ly (98 ± 3 pc)
Absolute magnitude (M_{V})	+0.08

Details
Mass	3.594±0.005 M_{☉}
Radius	2.57 R_{☉}
Luminosity	150.97 L_{☉}
Surface gravity (log g)	4.255±0.045 cgs
Temperature	12,449±124 K
Metallicity [Fe/H]	0.878±0.055 dex
Rotation	3.75413 days
Rotational velocity (v sin i)	29.84±1.77 km/s
Age	860,000 years

Other designations
- BD−19°6522, HD 223640, HIP 117629, HR 9031, SAO 165918

Database references
SIMBAD	data

108 Aquarii (abbreviated 108 Aqr) is a star in the equatorial constellation of Aquarius. 108 Aquarii is the Flamsteed designation, although it also bears the Bayer designation i^{3} Aquarii and the variable star designation ET Aquarii. It has an apparent visual magnitude of 5.194 and can be seen with the naked eye under suitably dark skies. Based upon an annual parallax shift of 10.23 (with a 3% margin of error), the distance to this star is 319 light-years (98 parsecs).

In 1962, Helmut Abt and John C. Golson announced that 108 Aquarii is a variable star. It was given its variable star designation in 1973.

This is an Ap star; meaning it has a peculiar spectrum that shows an overabundance of certain elements. It has more than three times the mass of the Sun and is 2.5 times the Sun's radius. 108 Aquarii is radiating 132 times the luminosity of the Sun from its outer atmosphere at an effective temperature of 12,274 K. At this heat, the star has the white hue of an A-type star.
