= WASP-15b =

Extrasolar planet orbiting WASP-15

WASP-15b / Asye
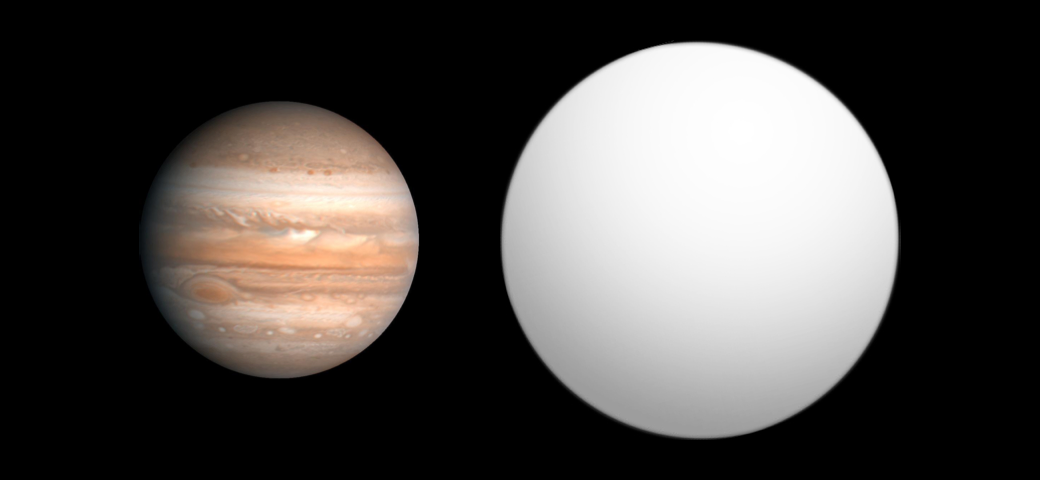
- Size comparison of WASP-15b with Jupiter.

Discovery
- Discovered by: West et al. (SuperWASP)
- Discovery site: SAAO
- Discovery date: April 29, 2009 (Publication date)
- Detection method: Transit

Orbital characteristics
- Semi-major axis: 0.0499 ± 0.0018 AU (7,460,000 ± 270,000 km)
- Eccentricity: 0
- Orbital period (sidereal): 3.7520656 ± 2.8e-06 d
- Inclination: 85.5 ± 0.5
- Star: WASP-15

Physical characteristics
- Mean radius: 1.428 ± 0.077 R_{J}
- Mass: 0.542 ± 0.05 M_{J}
- Mean density: 0.247 ± 0.035 g/cm^{3} (0.0089 ± 0.0013 lb/cu in)
- Temperature: 1652 ± 28

WASP-15b, formally named Asye, is an extrasolar planet discovered in 2008 by the SuperWASP collaboration, which seeks to discover exoplanets that transit their host stars. The planet orbits its host star at a distance of 0.05 AU every four days. The mass of this planet is about one half that of Jupiter, but its radius is nearly 50% larger than Jupiter's, making the density of this planet only one quarter that of water; it is thought that some other form of heating must explain its extremely low density. WASP-15b's discovery was published on April 29, 2009.

== Discovery ==
WASP-15 was first observed by the WASP-South branch of the SuperWASP project, which operates from the South African Astronomical Observatory, between May 4, 2006, and July 17, 2006. It was later observed by WASP-South from January 31, 2007, to July 17, 2007, and from January 31, 2008, to May 29, 2008. Further analysis taken from 24,943 collected data points revealed eleven full or partial transits.

Follow-up observations were conducted by a European and American science team at the 1.2 m Leonhard Euler Telescope at La Silla Observatory in Chile, which further raised the possibility of the existence of a planet in WASP-15's orbit; use of the CORALIE spectrograph on the Euler Telescope between March 6, 2008, and July 17, 2008, revealed that the variations in radial velocity measurements were not because of an eclipsing binary star system.

CORALIE and the High Resolution Echelle Spectrometer (HIRES) revealed the spectrum of WASP-15, which was used to derive the star's characteristics. The science team studying WASP-15 found that, after running best-fit models, WASP-15's radial velocity and transit shifts were most likely due to the existence of a planet.

WASP-15's planet, WASP-15b, had one of the lowest densities known amongst extrasolar planets when it was discovered. Its discovery paper was published by the American Astronomical Society on April 29, 2009, in the Astronomical Journal.

== Host star ==
WASP-15 is an F-type star located in the constellation Centaurus. It is located approximately 290 parsecs (900 light years) from Earth and has an apparent magnitude of 10.9, making it invisible to the unaided eye. The star is 1.18 times more massive than the Sun, and has a radius that is 1.477 times larger than that of the Sun, making it more diffuse. WASP-15 has an effective temperature of 6300 K, and is thus hotter than the Sun, although at 3.9 billion years, it is also younger. WASP-15 has a metallicity of [Fe/H] of -0.17, which means that it has 68% of the iron found in the Sun.

== Characteristics ==
WASP-15b has a mass of 0.542 times Jupiter's mass and a radius that is 1.428 times Jupiter's radius. Due in part to its proximity to its host star, a distance of 0.0499 AU (7,500,000 km), WASP-15b is greatly inflated, with a density of 0.247 g/cm^{3}. Another factor, such as an internal heat source, is suspected to add to this extremely high radius and extremely low density. WASP-15b orbits its host star every 3.7520656 days. It also has an orbital inclination of 85.5º, making it almost edge-on as seen from the Earth's perspective.

The study in 2012, utilizing a Rossiter–McLaughlin effect, have determined the planetary orbit is strongly misaligned with the equatorial plane of the star, misalignment equal to -139.6^{+4.3}_{−5.2}°. This spin-orbit angle makes the orbit of WASP-15b retrograde.

== Naming ==
In 2019 the IAU announced as part of NameExoWorlds that WASP-15 and its planet WASP-15b would be given official names chosen by school children from The Ivory Coast.

== See also ==
- SuperWASP
