= Chi Pegasi =

Red giant star in the constellation Pegasus

- Location of χ Pegasi (circled)

Observation data Epoch J2000 Equinox ICRS
- Constellation: Pegasus
- Right ascension: 00^{h} 14^{m} 36.16451^{s}
- Declination: +20° 12′ 24.1205″
- Apparent magnitude (V): 4.80

Characteristics
- Evolutionary stage: asymptotic giant branch
- Spectral type: M2+III
- U−B color index: +1.91
- B−V color index: +1.57
- Variable type: suspected

Astrometry
Radial velocity (R_{v})	−46.26±0.57 km/s
Proper motion (μ)	RA: +90.76 mas/yr Dec.: +1.24 mas/yr
Parallax (π)	8.86±0.22 mas
Distance	368 ± 9 ly (113 ± 3 pc)
Absolute magnitude (M_{V})	−0.47

Details
Mass	1.06±0.11 M_{☉}
Radius	52.88+1.31 −1.37 R_{☉}
Luminosity	435±23 L_{☉}
Surface gravity (log g)	0.80 cgs
Temperature	3,842±49 K
Metallicity [Fe/H]	0.00 dex
Rotational velocity (v sin i)	6.0 km/s
Age	7.70±2.01 Gyr

Other designations
- χ Peg, 89 Pegasi, NSV 99, BD+19°27, FK5 1004, GC 270, HD 1013, HIP 1168, HR 45, SAO 91792

Database references
SIMBAD	data

Chi Pegasi, Latinised from χ Pegasi, is a single star in the northern constellation of Pegasus, along the eastern constellation border with Pisces. It has a reddish hue and is faintly visible to the naked eye with an apparent visual magnitude of 4.80. The distance to this star is approximately 368 light-years based on parallax, but it is drifting closer with a radial velocity of −46 km/s.

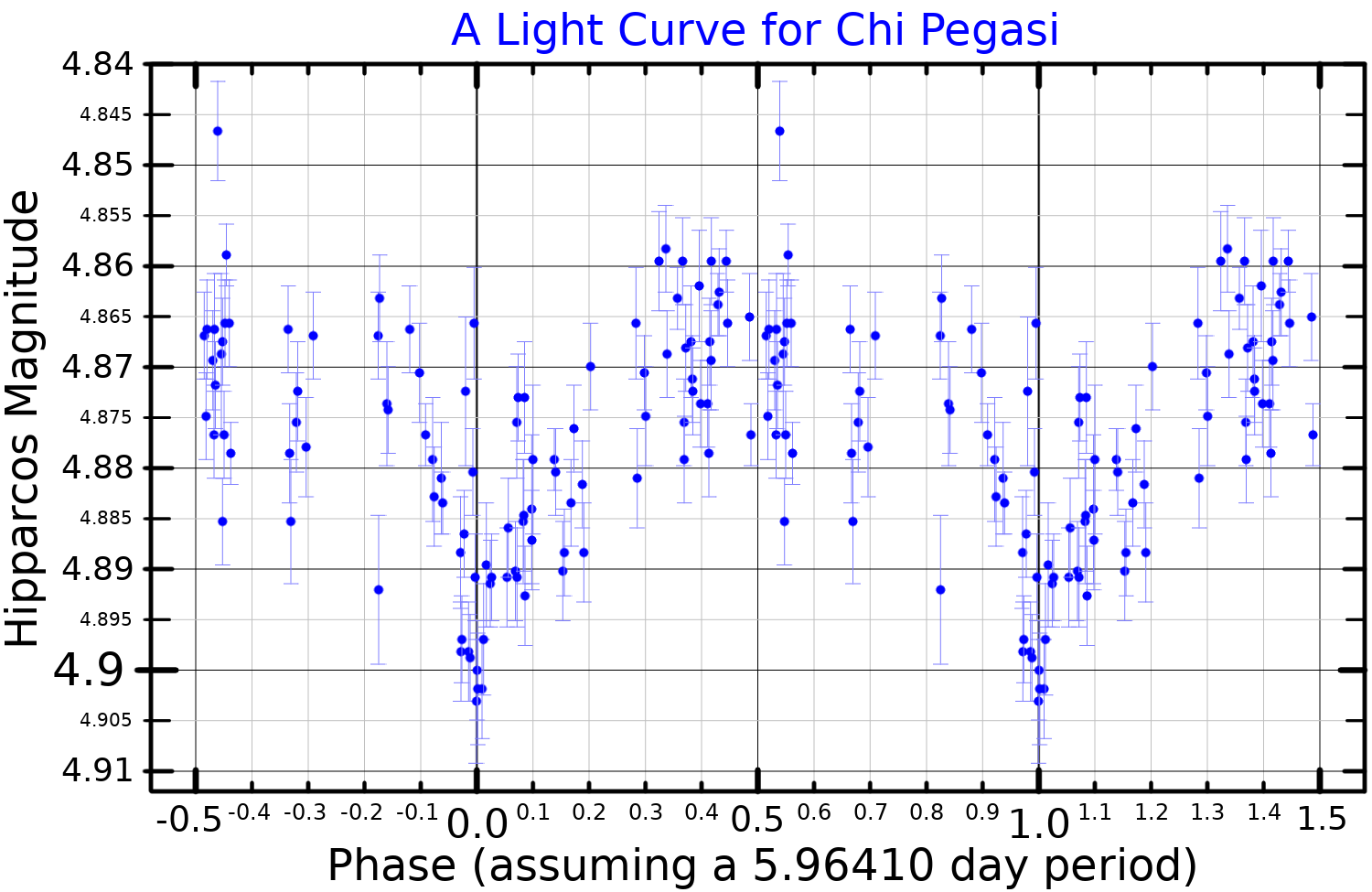
A light curve for Chi Pegasi, plotted from Hipparcos data

This is an aging red giant star on the asymptotic giant branch with a stellar classification of M2+III. It is about 8 billion years old with a mass 6% greater than the Sun's. With the supply of hydrogen at its core exhausted, the star has cooled and expanded to 53 times the girth of the Sun. It is radiating around 435 times the luminosity of the Sun from its swollen photosphere at an effective temperature of 3,842 K.

Chi Pegasi is a suspected small-amplitude variable. Koen and Eyer examined the Hipparcos data for Chi Pegasi, and found that its brightness varied by 0.0094 magnitudes, with a period of 5.9641 days.
