= Tau1 Aquarii =

Star in the constellation Aquarius

τ^{1} Aquarii
- Location of τ^{1} Aquarii (circled)

Observation data Epoch J2000 Equinox ICRS
- Constellation: Aquarius
- Right ascension: 22^{h} 47^{m} 42.769^{s}
- Declination: −14° 03′ 23.14″
- Apparent magnitude (V): +5.66

Characteristics
- Evolutionary stage: main sequence
- Spectral type: B9 V
- U−B color index: −0.25
- B−V color index: −0.05
- Variable type: Constant

Astrometry
Radial velocity (R_{v})	+15 km/s
Proper motion (μ)	RA: +30.413 mas/yr Dec.: −9.053 mas/yr
Parallax (π)	9.1322±0.0557 mas
Distance	357 ± 2 ly (109.5 ± 0.7 pc)
Absolute magnitude (M_{V})	+0.74

Details
Mass	2.8±0.1 M_{☉}
Radius	2.56 R_{☉}
Luminosity	87±2 L_{☉}
Surface gravity (log g)	4.06 cgs
Temperature	10,560±70 K
Rotational velocity (v sin i)	185 km/s
Age	100+100 −50 Myr

Other designations
- τ^{1} Aqr, 69 Aquarii, BD−14 6346, GC 31802, HD 215766, HIP 112542, HR 8673, SAO 165298, PPM 240758, ADS 16268, WDS J22477-1403A

Database references
SIMBAD	data

Tau^{1} Aquarii is a solitary star in the equatorial constellation of Aquarius. Its name is a Bayer designation that is Latinized from τ^{1} Aquarii, and abbreviated Tau^{1} Aqr or τ^{1} Aqr. With an apparent visual magnitude of 5.66, it is a faint naked eye target that requires dark suburban skies for viewing. Parallax measurements yield a distance estimate of approximately 357 light-years (109 parsecs) from the Sun. The star is drifting further away with a radial velocity of +15 km/s. It is a candidate member of the Pisces-Eridanus stellar stream.

The stellar classification of τ^{1} Aquarii is B9 V; at the borderline between a B- and A-type main sequence star. This is a candidate silicon star; a type of Ap star of class CP2 that shows a magnetic field. It is around 100 million years old and is spinning rapidly with a projected rotational velocity of 185 km/s. The star has 2.8 times the mass of the Sun and 2.56 times the Sun's radius. It is radiating 87 times the luminosity of the Sun from its photosphere at an effective temperature of 10,560 K. When examined in the infrared band, it displays an excess emission that is a characteristic of stars with an orbiting debris disk. The model that best fits the data suggests there are two concentric circumstellar disks.
