= WASP-11 =

Binary star in the constellation Aries

Observation data Epoch J2000.0 Equinox ICRS
- Constellation: Aries
- Right ascension: 03^{h} 09^{m} 28.5434^{s}
- Declination: +30° 40′ 24.863″
- Apparent magnitude (V): 11.57 ± 0.15

Characteristics
- Spectral type: K3V
- Apparent magnitude (B): 12.58 ± 0.30
- Apparent magnitude (V): 11.57 ± 0.15
- Apparent magnitude (J): 10.015 ± 0.020
- Apparent magnitude (H): 9.560 ± 0.019
- Apparent magnitude (K): 9.421 ± 0.017
- Variable type: planetary transit

Astrometry
Radial velocity (R_{v})	5.21±0.28 km/s
Proper motion (μ)	RA: 3.334(68) mas/yr Dec.: −44.433(53) mas/yr
Parallax (π)	7.6997±0.0579 mas
Distance	424 ± 3 ly (129.9 ± 1.0 pc)

Orbit
Period (P)	1922+480 −674 yr
Semi-major axis (a)	163+27 −38 au
Eccentricity (e)	0.911+0.017 −0.016
Inclination (i)	16.2+3.7 −5.2°
Longitude of the node (Ω)	80+13 −21°
Periastron epoch (T)	2444789+267 −251 BJD
Argument of periastron (ω) (secondary)	17+20 −18°

Details

WASP-11 A
Mass	0.847+0.028 −0.029 M_{☉}
Radius	0.74±0.01 R_{☉}
Luminosity	0.28±0.002 L_{☉}
Surface gravity (log g)	4.58±0.02 cgs
Temperature	4,884±16 K
Metallicity [Fe/H]	0.25±0.07 dex
Rotational velocity (v sin i)	1.9±0.9 km/s
Age	8.7±3.5 Gyr

WASP-11 B
Mass	0.331±0.010 M_{☉}
Temperature	3,494±37 K

Other designations
- HAT-P-10, TOI-4516, TIC 85593751, WASP-11, TYC 2340-1714-1, GSC 02340-01714, 2MASS J03092855+3040249

Database references
SIMBAD	data
Exoplanet Archive	data

WASP-11, also designated HAT-P-10, is a binary star system. The primary star is a main-sequence orange dwarf star, while the secondary is an M dwarf. Both are orbiting at a period of 1,900 years, with a semi-major axis of 163 au and a high eccentricity. The system is located about 424 light-years away in the constellation Aries.

== Planetary system ==
A hot Jupiter with half Jupiter's mass, WASP-11b (or HAT-P-10b), was detected around the primary star independently by the Hungarian Automated Telescope Network and the Wide Angle Search for Planets teams, both of which used the transit method.

The WASP-11 planetary system
Companion (in order from star)	Mass	Semimajor axis (AU)	Orbital period (days)	Eccentricity	Inclination (°)	Radius
b	0.532+0.020 −0.021 M_{J}	0.04376+0.00071 −0.00067	3.7224793±0.0000007	<0.03	89.03±0.34	0.990±0.022 R_{J}
