= HD 147506 =

Star in the constellation Hercules

HD 147506 / Hunor
Observation data Epoch J2000.0 Equinox ICRS
- Constellation: Hercules
- Right ascension: 16^{h} 20^{m} 36.3576^{s}
- Declination: +41° 02′ 53.107″
- Apparent magnitude (V): +8.71

Characteristics
- Evolutionary stage: main sequence
- Spectral type: F8V
- Variable type: planetary transit, planet-induced stellar pulsations

Astrometry
Radial velocity (R_{v})	−20.47±0.30 km/s
Proper motion (μ)	RA: −10.078(12) mas/yr Dec.: −29.057(15) mas/yr
Parallax (π)	7.7811±0.0118 mas
Distance	419.2 ± 0.6 ly (128.5 ± 0.2 pc)
Absolute magnitude (M_{V})	+3.31

Details
Mass	1.360±0.040 M_{☉}
Radius	1.640+0.090 −0.080 R_{☉}
Luminosity	4.3 L_{☉}
Surface gravity (log g)	4.14±0.04 cgs
Temperature	6,290±60 K
Metallicity [Fe/H]	0.140±0.080 dex
Rotational velocity (v sin i)	20.80±0.30 km/s
Age	2.60±0.50 Gyr

Other designations
- HAT-P-2, BD+41°2693, HD 147506, HIP 80076, SAO 46035

Database references
SIMBAD	data
Exoplanet Archive	data

HD 147506, also known as HAT-P-2 and formally named Hunor, is a magnitude 8.7 F8 dwarf star that is somewhat larger and hotter than the Sun. The star is approximately 419 light-years (128 parsecs) from Earth and is positioned near the keystone of Hercules. It is estimated to be 2 to 3 billion years old, towards the end of its main sequence life. There is one known transiting exoplanet, and a second planet not observed to transit.

== Nomenclature ==
The designation HD 147506 comes from the Henry Draper Catalogue. When the star was found to have a planet by the HATNet Project, it was assigned the designation HAT-P-2, indicating that it was the second star found to have a planet by this project.

The star HAT-P-2 has the proper name Hunor. The name was selected in the NameExoWorlds campaign by Hungary, during the 100th anniversary of the IAU. Hunor was a legendary ancestor of the Huns and the Hungarian nation, and brother of Magor (name of the planet HAT-P-2b).

== Variability ==
In addition to being a planetary transit variable, there are also stellar pulsations induced by the planet. This is the first known instance of a planet inducing pulsations in its host star. The amplitude is very small at approximately 40 parts per million. These pulsations correspond to exact harmonics of the planet's orbital frequency, indicating they are of a tidal origin.

== Planetary system ==
Orbiting the star is HAT-P-2b, later named Magor, which was at the time of its discovery the most massive transiting exoplanet. At around 9 times the mass of Jupiter and an estimated surface temperature of ~900 kelvins, on a 5.6 day orbit, this planet is unlike any previously discovered transiting planet. The planet has a large mass (nine times the mass of Jupiter), and a surface gravity 25 times that exerted by the Earth. Its orbital eccentricity is very large (e = 0.5). Since tidal forces should have reduced the orbital eccentricity of this planet, it was speculated that another massive planet found outside the orbit of HAT-P-2b is in orbital resonance with HAT-P-2b.

The planet was discovered by the HATNet Project, and the researchers there found the planet to be 10-20% larger than Jupiter. This discovery is important as it provides further support for the existing theory of planetary structure.

Additional measurements taken over six years show a long-term linear trend in the radial velocity data consistent with a companion of 15 Jupiter masses or greater. Adaptive optics images were taken at the Keck telescope, and when combined with the radial velocity data show the maximum mass of the companion is that of an M dwarf star. In 2023 the presence of an outer companion, HAT-P-2c, was confirmed, and its mass found to be planetary at around 11 times that of Jupiter.

The HD 147506 planetary system
Companion (in order from star)	Mass	Semimajor axis (AU)	Orbital period (days)	Eccentricity	Inclination (°)	Radius
b / Magor	8.70+0.19 −0.20 M_{J}	0.06880+0.00065 −0.00070	5.6334754(26)	0.50833+0.00082 −0.00075	86.72+1.1 −0.87	1.157+0.073 −0.063 R_{J}
c	9.9+3.1 −1.8 M_{J}	8.8+1.7 −1.1	8200+2400 −1500	0.36+0.13 −0.12	90±15	—

== See also ==
- List of transiting exoplanets
