= HD 80230 =

Star in the constellation Carina

- Location of HD 80230 (circled in red)

Observation data Epoch J2000.0 Equinox J2000.0
- Constellation: Carina
- Right ascension: 09^{h} 16^{m} 12.07286^{s}
- Declination: −57° 32′ 29.3007″
- Apparent magnitude (V): 4.34

Characteristics
- Evolutionary stage: AGB
- Spectral type: M0.5IIIa
- B−V color index: +1.602±0.079
- Variable type: Suspected

Astrometry
Radial velocity (R_{v})	−5.2±0.7 km/s
Proper motion (μ)	RA: −27.15 mas/yr Dec.: −14.18 mas/yr
Parallax (π)	6.68±0.15 mas
Distance	490 ± 10 ly (150 ± 3 pc)
Absolute magnitude (M_{V})	−1.53

Details
Mass	2.2±0.3 M_{☉}
Radius	74.86+3.84 −5.71 R_{☉}
Luminosity	1,172±60 L_{☉}
Surface gravity (log g)	0.95±0.12 cgs
Temperature	3,904+158 −96 K

Other designations
- g Car, NSV 4440, CPD−57°1961, GC 12813, HD 80230, HIP 45496, HR 3696, SAO 236787

Database references
SIMBAD	data

HD 80230 is a single star in the southern constellation of Carina, near the northern constellation border with Vela. It has the Bayer designation g Carinae, while HD 80230 is the star's identifier in the Henry Draper catalogue. This is a suspected variable star with a brightness that has been measured varying from magnitude 4.31 down to 4.35, both of which is bright enough for the star to be visible to the naked eye. The distance to this object is approximately 490 light years based on parallax, but it is drifting closer to the Sun with a radial velocity of −5 km/s.

This object is an aging red giant, currently on the asymptotic giant branch, with a stellar classification of M0.5IIIa. It is a mild barium star, showing trace enhancement of s-process elements in its spectrum. The star has 2.2 times the mass of the Sun and has expanded to 75 times the Sun's radius. It is radiating 1,172 times the luminosity of the Sun from its enlarged photosphere at an effective temperature of 3,904 K.
