= Rho Orionis =

Binary star system in the constellation Orion

ρ Orionis
- Location of ρ Orionis (circled)

Observation data Epoch J2000.0 Equinox ICRS
- Constellation: Orion
- Right ascension: 05^{h} 13^{m} 17.48015^{s}
- Declination: +02° 51′ 40.5479″
- Apparent magnitude (V): +4.44

Characteristics
- Spectral type: K0 III
- U−B color index: +1.13
- B−V color index: +1.19

Astrometry
Radial velocity (R_{v})	+40.5 km/s
Proper motion (μ)	RA: +0.83 mas/yr Dec.: +3.91 mas/yr
Parallax (π)	9.32±0.94 mas
Distance	approx. 350 ly (approx. 110 pc)
Absolute magnitude (M_{V})	−0.65

Details
Mass	2.67 M_{☉}
Radius	25 R_{☉}
Luminosity	251 L_{☉}
Surface gravity (log g)	2.4 cgs
Temperature	4,533 K
Metallicity [Fe/H]	0.06 dex
Age	650 Myr

Orbit
Period (P)	1031.4 days
Semi-major axis (a)	6.9 mas (Note: This is the photocentric semi-major axis, from the motion shown by the observed "star" relative to distant objects, and in practice relative to the barycentre. This is always smaller than the orbital semi-major axis, dramatically smaller when the primary star is much more massive than the secondary or when it is not much brighter.)
Eccentricity (e)	0.1
Inclination (i)	122.8°
Longitude of the node (Ω)	242.6°
Periastron epoch (T)	2426182.46
Argument of periastron (ω) (secondary)	17.9°
Semi-amplitude (K_{1}) (primary)	8.70 km/s

Other designations
- ρ Ori, 17 Orionis, BD+02°888, HD 33856, HIP 24331, HR 1698, SAO 112528

Database references
SIMBAD	data

Rho Orionis, Latinised from ρ Orionis, is the Bayer designation for an orange-hued binary star system in the equatorial constellation of Orion. It is visible to the naked eye with an apparent visual magnitude of +4.44. The star shows an annual parallax shift of 9.32 mas due to the orbital motion of the Earth, which provides a distance estimate of roughly 350 light-years from the Sun. It is moving away from the Sun with a radial velocity of +40.5 km/s. About 2.6 million years ago, Rho Orionis made its perihelion passage at a distance of around 10 light-years (3.1 parsecs).

This is a single-lined spectroscopic binary system with an orbital period of 2.8 years and an eccentricity of 0.1. The visible component is an evolved giant star of type K with a stellar classification of K0 III. Its measured angular diameter is 2.19±0.02 mas, which, at its estimated distance yields a physical size of about 25 times the radius of the Sun. It has 2.67 times the mass of the Sun and is about 650 million years old. The star is radiating 251 times the Sun's luminosity from its enlarged photosphere at an effective temperature of 4,533 K.
