= 50 Camelopardalis =

Giant star in the constellation Lynx

- Location of 50 Camelopardalis (circled)

Observation data Epoch J2000 Equinox J2000
- Constellation: Lynx
- Right ascension: 07^{h} 44^{m} 04.1780^{s}
- Declination: +50° 26′ 01.658″
- Apparent magnitude (V): 5.36 + 8.40

Characteristics
- Evolutionary stage: main sequence
- Spectral type: A0IIIn or B9Vn
- U−B color index: 0.00
- B−V color index: 0.00

Astrometry
Radial velocity (R_{v})	+19.75±8.64 km/s
Proper motion (μ)	RA: −5.434 mas/yr Dec.: −26,351 mas/yr
Parallax (π)	7.5728±0.3503 mas
Distance	430 ± 20 ly (132 ± 6 pc)
Absolute magnitude (M_{V})	−1.39

Details

A
Mass	3.1 M_{☉}
Radius	5.4 R_{☉}
Luminosity	153 L_{☉}
Surface gravity (log g)	3.40 cgs
Temperature	9,974 K
Metallicity [Fe/H]	−0.01 dex
Rotational velocity (v sin i)	202 km/s
Age	298 Myr

Other designations
- 50 Cam, BD+50°1460, HD 61931, HIP 37701, HR 2969

Database references
SIMBAD	data

50 Camelopardalis is a double star in the northern constellation of Lynx. This object is visible to the naked eye as a faint white star with an apparent visual magnitude of 5.4. It is 430 light years away and moving further from the Earth with a heliocentric radial velocity of 20 km/s.

50 Camelopardalis has a spectral classification of A0 or B9 and a luminosity class of V or III. The stellar spectrum is noted to have unusually nebulous absorption lines due to its rapid rotation. At an age of 300 million years, the star is modelled to be in the late stages of the main sequence. It has expanded to over five times the radius of the Sun and is radiating 153 times the luminosity of the Sun from its photosphere at an effective temperature of 9,974 K.

Double star catalogues list an 8th-magnitude companion at a separation of 1″. Due to its closeness to the much brighter star, little is known about the companion. The Tycho double star catalogue gives a proper motion similar to the bright primary star.
