= HAT-P-2b =

Extrasolar planet

HAT-P-2b / Magor
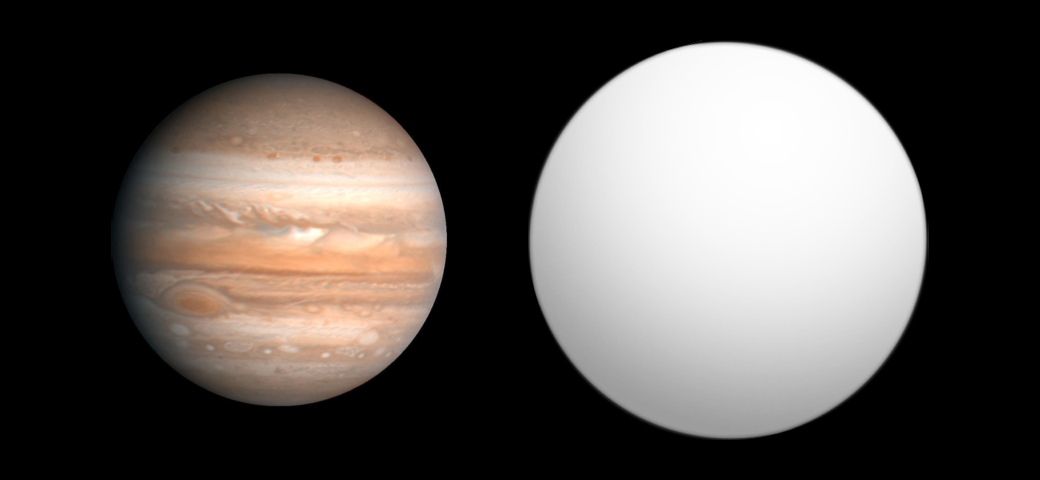
- Size comparison of HAT-P-2b with Jupiter.

Discovery
- Discovered by: HATNet Project
- Discovery date: 2007-05-01
- Detection method: Transit

Designations
- Alternative names: HD 147506 b, Magor

Orbital characteristics
- Semi-major axis: 0.06880+0.00065 −0.00070 AU
- Eccentricity: 0.50833+0.00082 −0.00075
- Orbital period (sidereal): 5.6334754±0.0000026 d
- Inclination: 86.72°+1.1° −0.87°
- Time of periastron: 2455289.4721±0.0038
- Argument of periastron: 186.96°+0.87° −0.88°
- Semi-amplitude: 938.1+10.0 −9.9 m/s
- Star: HD 147506

Physical characteristics
- Mean radius: 1.157+0.073 −0.063 R_{J}
- Mass: 8.70+0.19 −0.20 M_{J}
- Mean density: 7.3+1.4 −1.1 g/cm^{3}
- Surface gravity: 162±27 m/s²
- Temperature: 1540±30 K

HAT-P-2b is an extrasolar planet detected by the HATNet Project in May 2007. It orbits a class F star HAT-P-2, (bigger and hotter than the Sun), located about 420 light-years away in the constellation Hercules.

The planet is officially named Magor. The name was selected in the NameExoWorlds campaign by Hungary, during the 100th anniversary of the International Astronomical Union. Magor was a legendary ancestor of the Magyar people and the Hungarian nation, and brother of Hunor (name of the star HAT-P-2).

== Physical properties ==
The planet's mass has been estimated to be 8.7 times that of Jupiter, while its diameter is 1.157 times Jupiter's. Its small size, despite the bloating of the planet's atmosphere, is caused by the strong gravity of the planet. The planetary atmosphere has indeed the smallest scale height, equal to 26km, among exoplanets with measurable atmospheres as of 2021.

This indicates its mean density is twice that of Earth and its surface gravity approximately 24 times that of Earth, almost equal to the Sun.

In addition to heat from its primary star, tidal heating is thought to have played a significant role in this planet's evolution.

== Orbit ==
The planetary orbital period is 5 days 15 hours, and its inclination is such that it crosses directly in front of the star as viewed from Earth. The orbit is very eccentric, ranging from 4.90 million to 15.36 million miles from the star.

As of August 2008, the most recent calculation of HAT-P-2b's Rossiter–McLaughlin effect and so spin-orbit angle was that of Winn in 2007 but Loeillet has in 2008 disputed it. For Winn, this is +1 ± 13 degrees. The study in 2012 determined the planetary orbit is probably aligned with the equatorial plane of the star, with misalignment equal to 9±10°.

== Other planets in the system ==
It has been suggested that there is a second outer planet perturbing HAT-P-2b. In 2023, the presence of a second planet, HAT-P-2c, was confirmed.
