= HD 200661 =

Star in the constellation Equuleus

- Location of HD 200661 (circled)

Observation data Epoch J2000.0 Equinox J2000.0 (ICRS)
- Constellation: Equuleus
- Right ascension: 21^{h} 04^{m} 41.64052^{s}
- Declination: +02° 56′ 32.1874″
- Apparent magnitude (V): 6.41±0.01

Characteristics
- Evolutionary stage: horizontal branch
- Spectral type: K0 III
- U−B color index: +0.89
- B−V color index: +1.06

Astrometry
Radial velocity (R_{v})	−12.1±0.2 km/s
Proper motion (μ)	RA: +13.336 mas/yr Dec.: +5.800 mas/yr
Parallax (π)	7.5933±0.0353 mas
Distance	430 ± 2 ly (131.7 ± 0.6 pc)
Absolute magnitude (M_{V})	+0.53

Details
Mass	1.22 M_{☉}
Radius	10.64±0.54 R_{☉}
Luminosity	60.59^{+0.53}_{−0.52} L_{☉}
Surface gravity (log g)	2.44 cgs
Temperature	4,815±122 K
Metallicity [Fe/H]	−0.21 dex

Other designations
- 7 G. Equueli, AG+02°2688, BD+02°4297, GC 29434, HD 200661, HIP 104041, HR 8067, SAO 126519

Database references
SIMBAD	data

HD 200661 (HR 8067; 7 G. Equueli) is a solitary star located in the equatorial constellation Equuleus, the foal. It has an apparent magnitude of 6.41, placing it near the limit for naked eye visibility. The star is located at a distance of 430 light years based on Gaia DR3 parallax measurements, and it is drifting closer with a heliocentric radial velocity of −12.1 km/s. At its current distance, HD 200661's brightness is diminished by an interstellar extinction of 0.18 magnitude, and it has an absolute magnitude of +0.53.

HD 200661 has a stellar classification of K0 III, indicating that it is an evolved K-type star that has ceased hydrogen fusion at its core and left the main sequence. It has 122% the mass of the Sun, but it has expanded to 10.64 times the radius of the Sun as a result of its evolved state. It radiates 60.59 times the luminosity of the Sun from its enlarged photosphere at an effective temperature of 4815 K, giving it a yellowish-orange hue when viewed in the night sky. HD 200661 is metal deficient with an iron abundance 61.7% that of the Sun's.
