= J Centauri =

Star in the constellation Centaurus

- Location of J Centauri (circled in red)

Observation data Epoch J2000.0 Equinox ICRS
- Constellation: Centaurus
- Right ascension: 13^{h} 22^{m} 37.9331^{s}
- Declination: −60° 59′ 18.170″
- Apparent magnitude (V): +4.505

Characteristics
- Evolutionary stage: main sequence
- Spectral type: B3V
- U−B color index: −0.62
- B−V color index: −0.13

Astrometry
Radial velocity (R_{v})	+6.0 km/s
Proper motion (μ)	RA: −29.518 mas/yr Dec.: −21.698 mas/yr
Parallax (π)	8.8824±0.1293 mas
Distance	367 ± 5 ly (113 ± 2 pc)
Absolute magnitude (M_{V})	−0.66

Details
Mass	4.1 M_{☉}
Radius	3.6 R_{☉}
Luminosity	265 L_{☉}
Surface gravity (log g)	3.97 cgs
Temperature	24,757 K
Rotational velocity (v sin i)	223 km/s
Age	15.4 Myr

Other designations
- HR 5035, HD 116087, CD−60°4640, FK5 1347, HIP 65271, SAO 252284, GC 18087, CCDM J13226-6059

Database references
SIMBAD	data

J Centauri (J Cen) is a star in the constellation Centaurus. Its mean apparent magnitude is 4.5, making it easily visible to the naked eye. It is approximately 350 light years from Earth.

J Centauri is a spectral class B3V main sequence star with a luminosity 265 times that of the Sun. The temperature of the star's photosphere is nearly 25,000 K. The rotation velocity at the equator is at least 223 km/s. It is believed to be a binary star system.

This star may be a member of the Scorpio-Centaurus OB association (Sco OB2). This is one of the nearest regions of recent star formation.
