= HD 203842 =

Star in the constellation Equuleus

- Location of HD 203842 (circled)

Observation data Epoch J2000.0 Equinox ICRS
- Constellation: Equuleus
- Right ascension: 21^{h} 24^{m} 24.56372^{s}
- Declination: +10° 10′ 27.1976″
- Apparent magnitude (V): 6.32±0.01

Characteristics
- Evolutionary stage: subgiant
- Spectral type: F5 III
- U−B color index: +0.13
- B−V color index: +0.47

Astrometry
Radial velocity (R_{v})	−21.8±3.6 km/s
Proper motion (μ)	RA: +75.072 mas/yr Dec.: +20.436 mas/yr
Parallax (π)	8.7242±0.1771 mas
Distance	374 ± 8 ly (115 ± 2 pc)
Absolute magnitude (M_{V})	+1.06

Details
Mass	2.00 M_{☉}
Radius	4.54±0.23 R_{☉}
Luminosity	31.1±1.2 L_{☉}
Surface gravity (log g)	3.47 cgs
Temperature	6,271±42 K
Metallicity [Fe/H]	+0.19^{+0.04}_{−0.05} dex
Rotational velocity (v sin i)	80.6 km/s
Age	1.24 Gyr

Other designations
- 30 G. Equulei, AG+09°2981, BD+09°4800, GC 29969, HD 203842, HIP 105695, HR 8191, SAO 126774

Database references
SIMBAD	data

HD 203842, also known as HR 8191 or rarely 30 G. Equueli, is a solitary, yellowish-white hued star located in the constellation Equuleus. It has an apparent magnitude of 6.32, placing it near the limit for naked eye visibility, even under ideal conditions. Gaia DR3 parallax measurements imply a distance of 374 light years, and it is currently drifting closer with a somewhat constrained heliocentric radial velocity of −21.8 km/s. At its current distance HD 203842's brightness is diminished by 0.15 magnitudes due to interstellar dust and it has an absolute magnitude of +1.06.

A 2005 Hipparcos survey noticed variations in its proper motion, which would indicate that it is an astrometric binary. However, a subsequent survey revealed that HD 203842 is not an astrometric binary (32% chance) and is more likely to be solitary. This object is part of the Hyades Stream.

HD 203842 has a stellar classification of F5 III, indicating that it is an evolved F-type giant star. It is currently in the Hertzsprung gap, meaning that it exhausting its supply of hydrogen and evolving towards the red giant branch. It has double times the Sun's mass but at the age of 1.24 billion years, it has expanded to 4.54 times the Sun's radius. It radiates 31.1 times the Sun's luminosity from its enlarged photosphere at an effective temperature of 6,271 K. HD 203842 is metal enriched with 155% the Sun's iron abundance and spins quickly with a projected rotational velocity of 80.6 km/s.
