= Q Carinae =

The names q Carinae and Q Carinae are the Bayer designations of two different giant stars in the constellation Carina.

- For the variable star q Carinae, see V337 Carinae.
- For the orange star Q Carinae, see HD 61248.
