= HD 61248 =

Star in the constellation Carina

Observation data Epoch J2000.0 Equinox ICRS
- Constellation: Carina
- Right ascension: 07^{h} 35^{m} 39.72266^{s}
- Declination: −52° 32′ 01.8087″
- Apparent magnitude (V): 4.93

Characteristics
- Spectral type: K3 III
- B−V color index: 1.373±0.064

Astrometry
Radial velocity (R_{v})	+63.32±0.13 km/s
Proper motion (μ)	RA: +22.137 mas/yr Dec.: -11.639 mas/yr
Parallax (π)	8.1036±0.1335 mas
Distance	402 ± 7 ly (123 ± 2 pc)
Absolute magnitude (M_{V})	−0.47

Details
Mass	1.1 M_{☉}
Radius	30.27+1.86 −1.95 R_{☉}
Luminosity	279.3±5.5 L_{☉}
Surface gravity (log g)	1.51 cgs
Temperature	4,289+145 −126 K
Metallicity [Fe/H]	0.24 dex
Age	860 Myr

Other designations
- Q Car, CPD−52º1231, FK5 1198, GC 10206, HD 61248, HIP 36942, HR 2934, SAO 235336

Database references
SIMBAD	data

HD 61248 is a single star in the southern constellation of Carina. It has the Bayer designation Q Carinae, while HD 61248 is the star's identifier in the Henry Draper Catalogue. This star has an orange hue and is visible to the naked eye with an apparent visual magnitude of 4.93. Based upon parallax measurements, it is located approximately 402 light years in distance from the Sun. The object is drifting further away with a radial velocity of +63 km/s, having come to within 89.6 light-years some 1.8 million years ago.

This is an aging giant star with a stellar classification of K3 III, which means it is no longer undergoing core hydrogen fusion. It has expanded to 30 times the Sun's radius and is radiating 279 times the luminosity of the Sun from its enlarged photosphere at an effective temperature of 4,289 K.
