= Variable-star designation =

Unique identifier given to variable stars

In astronomy, a variable-star designation is a unique identifier given to variable stars. It extends the Bayer designation format, with an identifying label (as described below) preceding the Latin genitive of the name of the constellation in which the star lies. The identifying label can be one or two Latin letters or a V plus a number (e.g. V399). Examples are R Coronae Borealis, YZ Ceti, V603 Aquilae. (See List of constellations for a list of constellations and the genitive forms of their names.)

== Naming ==
The current naming system is:

- Stars with existing Greek letter Bayer designations are not given new designations.
- Otherwise, start with the letter R and go through Z.
- Continue with RR–RZ, then use SS–SZ, TT–TZ and so on until ZZ.
- After ZZ return to the beginning of the Latin alphabet and use AA–AZ, BB–BZ, CC–CZ, and so on, until reaching QZ, but omitting the letter J in either first or second position. (Note: Most of this system was invented in Germany, which was still on Fraktur at the time, in which the majuscules "I" and "J" can be difficult to distinguish.) The second letter is never nearer the beginning of the alphabet than the first, e.g., no star can be BA, CA, CB, DA and so on.
- Abandon the Latin letters after all 334 combinations of letters and start naming stars with V335, V336, and so on.
- After the combination/number, put the genitive of the constellation name (e.g. Centaurus becomes Centauri, Orion becomes Orionis) to get the star name.

List of variable star designations
Variable Number	Designation
1	R
2	S
3	T
4	U
5	V
6	W
7	X
8	Y
9	Z
10	RR
11	RS
12	RT
13	RU
14	RV
15	RW
16	RX
17	RY
18	RZ
19	SS
20	ST
21	SU
22	SV
23	SW
24	SX
25	SY
26	SZ
27	TT
28	TU
29	TV
30	TW
31	TX
32	TY
33	TZ
34	UU
35	UV
36	UW
37	UX
38	UY
39	UZ
40	VV
41	VW
42	VX
43	VY
44	VZ
45	WW
46	WX
47	WY
48	WZ
49	XX
50	XY
51	XZ
52	YY
53	YZ
54	ZZ
55	AA
56	AB
57	AC
58	AD
59	AE
60	AF
61	AG
62	AH
63	AI
64	AK
65	AL
66	AM
67	AN
68	AO
69	AP
70	AQ
71	AR
72	AS
73	AT
74	AU
75	AV
76	AW
77	AX
78	AY
79	AZ
80	BB
81	BC
82	BD
83	BE
84	BF
85	BG
86	BH
87	BI
88	BK
89	BL
90	BM
91	BN
92	BO
93	BP
94	BQ
95	BR
96	BS
97	BT
98	BU
99	BV
100	BW
101	BX
102	BY
103	BZ
104	CC
105	CD
106	CE
107	CF
108	CG
109	CH
110	CI
111	CK
112	CL
113	CM
114	CN
115	CO
116	CP
117	CQ
118	CR
119	CS
120	CT
121	CU
122	CV
123	CW
124	CX
125	CY
126	CZ
127	DD
128	DE
129	DF
130	DG
131	DH
132	DI
133	DK
134	DL
135	DM
136	DN
137	DO
138	DP
139	DQ
140	DR
141	DS
142	DT
143	DU
144	DV
145	DW
146	DX
147	DY
148	DZ
149	EE
150	EF
151	EG
152	EH
153	EI
154	EK
155	EL
156	EM
157	EN
158	EO
159	EP
160	EQ
161	ER
162	ES
163	ET
164	EU
165	EV
166	EW
167	EX
168	EY
169	EZ
170	FF
171	FG
172	FH
173	FI
174	FK
175	FL
176	FM
177	FN
178	FO
179	FP
180	FQ
181	FR
182	FS
183	FT
184	FU
185	FV
186	FW
187	FX
188	FY
189	FZ
190	GG
191	GH
192	GI
193	GK
194	GL
195	GM
196	GN
197	GO
198	GP
199	GQ
200	GR
201	GS
202	GT
203	GU
204	GV
205	GW
206	GX
207	GY
208	GZ
209	HH
210	HI
211	HK
212	HL
213	HM
214	HN
215	HO
216	HP
217	HQ
218	HR
219	HS
220	HT
221	HU
222	HV
223	HW
224	HX
225	HY
226	HZ
227	II
228	IK
229	IL
230	IM
231	IN
232	IO
233	IP
234	IQ
235	IR
236	IS
237	IT
238	IU
239	IV
240	IW
241	IX
242	IY
243	IZ
244	KK
245	KL
246	KM
247	KN
248	KO
249	KP
250	KQ
251	KR
252	KS
253	KT
254	KU
255	KV
256	KW
257	KX
258	KY
259	KZ
260	LL
261	LM
262	LN
263	LO
264	LP
265	LQ
266	LR
267	LS
268	LT
269	LU
270	LV
271	LW
272	LX
273	LY
274	LZ
275	MM
276	MN
277	MO
278	MP
279	MQ
280	MR
281	MS
282	MT
283	MU
284	MV
285	MW
286	MX
287	MY
288	MZ
289	NN
290	NO
291	NP
292	NQ
293	NR
294	NS
295	NT
296	NU
297	NV
298	NW
299	NX
300	NY
301	NZ
302	OO
303	OP
304	OQ
305	OR
306	OS
307	OT
308	OU
309	OV
310	OW
311	OX
312	OY
313	OZ
314	PP
315	PQ
316	PR
317	PS
318	PT
319	PU
320	PV
321	PW
322	PX
323	PY
324	PZ
325	QQ
326	QR
327	QS
328	QT
329	QU
330	QV
331	QW
332	QX
333	QY
334	QZ
335	V335
336	V336
337	V337
338	V338
-	V339, V340, etc.

== History ==
In the early 19th century few variable stars were known, so it seemed reasonable to use the letters of the Latin script. Because very few constellations contained stars with uppercase Latin-letter Bayer designation greater than Q, the letter R was chosen as a starting point so as to avoid confusion with letter spectral types or the (now rarely used) Latin-letter Bayer designations. Although Lacaille had used uppercase R–Z letters in a few cases, for example X Puppis (HR 2548), these designations were either dropped or accepted as variable star designations. The star T Puppis was accepted by Argelander as a variable star and is included in the General Catalogue of Variable Stars with that designation but is now classed as non-variable.

This variable star naming convention was developed by Friedrich W. Argelander. There is a widespread belief according to which Argelander chose the letter R for German rot or French rouge, both meaning "red", because many variable stars known at that time appear red. However, Argelander's own statement disproves this.

By 1836, even the letter S had only been used in one constellation, Serpens. With the advent of photography the number of variables piled up quickly, and variable star names soon fell into the Bayer-trap of reaching the end of the alphabet while still having stars to name. After two subsequent supplementary double-lettering systems hit similar limits, numbers were finally introduced.

In 1865, G. F. Chambers published a catalogue of 123 variables, all but one of which had a variable star designation in the Argelander scheme. The following year, E. Schönfeld published a variable star catalogue with 112 entries; most used the same scheme. This catalogue would not be updated until 1888, when S. C. Chandler published an update. He released two more updates to this catalogue in 1893 and 1896. The German Astronomical Society then took over the task of maintaining variable star identifiers by publishing annual updates in the Astronomische Nachrichten journal.

As with all categories of astronomical objects, names are now assigned by the International Astronomical Union (IAU). Since 1946, the IAU has delegated this task to the Sternberg Astronomical Institute and the Institute of Astronomy of the Russian Academy of Sciences in Moscow, Russia. Sternberg publishes the General Catalog of Variable Stars (GCVS), which is amended approximately once every two years by the publication of a new Name-List of Variable Stars. For example, in December 2011, the 80th Name-List of Variable Stars, Part II, was released, containing designations for 2,161 recently discovered variable stars, which brought the total number in the GCVS to 45,678 variable stars. Among the newly designated objects were V0654 Aurigae, V1367 Centauri, and BU Coronae Borealis.

== See also ==
- star catalogue
- star designation
