= HR 3643 =

Binary star system in the constellation Carina

- Location of HR 3643 (circled in red)

Observation data Epoch J2000 Equinox ICRS
- Constellation: Carina
- Right ascension: 09^{h} 05^{m} 08.81309^{s}
- Declination: −72° 36′ 09.7437″
- Apparent magnitude (V): 4.48 + 14.50

Characteristics
- Spectral type: F8II + DA1.6
- B−V color index: +0.607±0.010

Astrometry
| Radial velocity (R_{v}) | +22.5±0.7 km/s |
| Proper motion (μ) | RA: −8.81 mas/yr Dec.: −5.26 mas/yr |
| Parallax (π) | 8.14±0.15 mas |
| Distance | 401 ± 7 ly (123 ± 2 pc) |
| Absolute magnitude (M_{V}) | −0.98 |

Details

A
| Radius | 13.15+1.03 −0.53 R_{☉} |
| Luminosity | 206.2±5.4 L_{☉} |
| Temperature | 6,030+127 −222 K |
| Metallicity [Fe/H] | −0.04±0.04 dex |
| Rotational velocity (v sin i) | 53 km/s |

B
| Mass | 0.74 M_{☉} |
| Surface gravity (log g) | 7.47 cgs |
| Temperature | 21,551 K |
| Age | 25 Myr |

Other designations
- G Car, CPD−72°779, FK5 2720, GC 12595, HD 78791, HIP 44599, HR 3643, SAO 256582, WDS J17039+1941, WD 0905-724

Database references
| SIMBAD | data |

HR 3643 is a binary star system in the southern constellation of Carina. It has the Bayer designation G Carinae, with HR 3643 being the star's designation in the Bright Star Catalogue. The system is visible to the naked eye with an apparent visual magnitude of 4.48. It is located at a distance of approximately 401 light years from the Sun based on parallax, and is drifting further away with a radial velocity of +22.5 km/s.

The binary nature of this system was first detected as an ultraviolet excess in 1996. No radial velocity variation has been detected so it must be a wide system with an orbital period of up to 21 years. The estimated semimajor axis of their orbit is 10.90 AU. The pair were not resolved using the Hubble Space Telescope WFPC2 instrument.

The primary is an evolved bright giant star with a yellow-white hue and a stellar classification of F8II. With the supply of hydrogen exhausted at its core, it has expanded to 13 times the Sun's radius. It has a relatively high projected rotational velocity of 53 km/s for a star of this class, suggesting it is an intermediate-mass star with 2–5 times the mass of the Sun. The star is radiating 206 times the luminosity of the Sun from its photosphere at an effective temperature of 6,030 K.

The magnitude 14.50 companion is a white dwarf with a class of DA1.6. It has a mass estimated at 74% of the mass of the Sun and a temperature of 21,551 K, indicating a cooling time of 25 million years. This object is a source for hard X-ray emission. The primary is one of the most massive stars known to have a white dwarf companion.
