= 106 Aquarii =

Star in the constellation Aquarius

- Location of 106 Aquarii (circled)

Observation data Epoch J2000.0 (ICRS) Equinox ICRS
- Constellation: Aquarius
- Right ascension: 23^{h} 44^{m} 12.07852^{s}
- Declination: −18° 16′ 36.9999″
- Apparent magnitude (V): +5.244

Characteristics
- Evolutionary stage: main sequence
- Spectral type: B9 V
- U−B color index: −0.239
- B−V color index: −0.086

Astrometry
Radial velocity (R_{v})	+14.0 km/s
Proper motion (μ)	RA: +27.23 mas/yr Dec.: −2.94 mas/yr
Parallax (π)	8.7588±0.2859 mas
Distance	370 ± 10 ly (114 ± 4 pc)
Absolute magnitude (M_{V})	−0.07

Details
Mass	3.0 M_{☉}
Radius	3.0 R_{☉}
Luminosity	146 L_{☉}
Surface gravity (log g)	3.95±0.07 cgs
Temperature	11,505±142 K
Rotational velocity (v sin i)	328±48 km/s

Other designations
- i^{1} Aqr, 106 Aqr, BD−19°6500, FK5 1621, HD 222847, HIP 117089, HR 8998, SAO 165854

Database references
SIMBAD	data

106 Aquarii, abbreviated 106 Aqr, is a single star in the equatorial constellation of Aquarius. 106 Aquarii is the Flamsteed designation, and it also bears the Bayer designation i^{1} Aquarii. It has an apparent visual magnitude of +5.2, making it bright enough to be viewed from the suburbs according to the Bortle Dark-Sky Scale. An annual parallax shift of 8.61 milliarcseconds yields an estimated distance of around 380 light-years (120 parsecs) from Earth.

The spectrum of this star fits a stellar classification of B9 V, indicating this is a B-type main sequence star. It is spinning rapidly with a projected rotational velocity of 328 km/s. The star has three times the mass of the Sun and is radiating 146 times the Sun's luminosity from its photosphere at an effective temperature of 11,505 K. X-ray emission with a luminosity of 6.0×10^{29} erg s^{−1} has been detected from this star. This is unusual since a B-type star normally does not have any significant X-ray emission. Instead, it may have an undetected lower mass companion.
