= Nu Aquarii =

Star in the constellation Aquarius

ν Aquarii
- Location of ν Aquarii (circled)

Observation data Epoch J2000 Equinox ICRS
- Constellation: Aquarius
- Right ascension: 21^{h} 09^{m} 35.648^{s}
- Declination: −11° 22′ 18.09″
- Apparent magnitude (V): 4.520

Characteristics
- Evolutionary stage: red giant branch
- Spectral type: G8 III
- U−B color index: +0.66
- B−V color index: +0.943

Astrometry
Radial velocity (R_{v})	−11.23 km/s
Proper motion (μ)	RA: +93.613 mas/yr Dec.: −15.494 mas/yr
Parallax (π)	20.0842±0.1137 mas
Distance	162.4 ± 0.9 ly (49.8 ± 0.3 pc)
Absolute magnitude (M_{V})	+0.93

Details
Mass	2.35 M_{☉}
Radius	8 R_{☉}
Luminosity	37 L_{☉}
Surface gravity (log g)	2.88±0.09 cgs
Temperature	4,920±5 K
Metallicity [Fe/H]	−0.06±0.04 dex
Rotational velocity (v sin i)	2.8±0.3 km/s
Age	708 Myr

Other designations
- ν Aquarii, ν Aqr, Nu Aqr, 13 Aquarii, BD−11 5538, HD 201381, HIP 104459, HR 8093, SAO 164182

Database references
SIMBAD	data

Nu Aquarii is a star in the equatorial constellation of Aquarius. The name is a Bayer designation that is Latinized from ν Aquarii, and abbreviated Nu Aqr or ν Aqr. With an apparent visual magnitude of 4.52, Nu Aquarii is faintly visible to the naked eye. Its distance from Earth, as determined from parallax measurements, is 162 light-years (50 parsecs). The star is drifting closer to the Sun with a radial velocity of −11 km/s.

At an estimated age of 708 million years, Nu Aquarii has exhausted the supply of hydrogen at its core and evolved into a giant star with a spectrum that matches a stellar classification of G8 III. It has double the mass of the Sun and has expanded to eight times the Sun's radius. Nu Aquarii is radiating 37 times the luminosity of the Sun from its photosphere at an effective temperature of 4,920 K. At this heat, the star is glowing with the yellowish hue of a G-type star.

Together with μ Aquarii, it is Albulaan /ˌælbjəˈlɑːn/, a name derived from the Arabic term al-bulaʽān (ألبولعان), meaning "the two swallowers". This star, along with ε Aqr (Albali) and μ Aqr (Albulaan), were al Bulaʽ (البلع)—the Swallower.

In Chinese, 天壘城 (Tiān Lěi Chéng), meaning Celestial Ramparts, refers to an asterism consisting of ν Aquarii, ξ Aquarii, 46 Capricorni, 47 Capricorni, λ Capricorni, 50 Capricorni, 18 Aquarii, 29 Capricorni, 9 Aquarii, 8 Aquarii, 14 Aquarii, 17 Aquarii and 19 Aquarii. Consequently, the Chinese name for ν Aquarii itself is 天壘城十 (Tiān Lěi Chéng shí, English: the Tenth Star of Celestial Ramparts).
