= Xi Aquarii =

Star in the constellation Aquarius

ξ Aquarii
- Location of ξ Aquarii (circled)

Observation data Epoch J2000 Equinox ICRS
- Constellation: Aquarius
- Right ascension: 21^{h} 37^{m} 45.110^{s}
- Declination: −07° 51′ 15.13″
- Apparent magnitude (V): 4.690

Characteristics
- Evolutionary stage: main sequence
- Spectral type: A7 V
- U−B color index: +0.187
- B−V color index: +0.181

Astrometry
Radial velocity (R_{v})	−26.2 km/s
Proper motion (μ)	RA: +114.890 mas/yr Dec.: −24.434 mas/yr
Parallax (π)	18.2324±0.1374 mas
Distance	179 ± 1 ly (54.8 ± 0.4 pc)
Absolute magnitude (M_{V})	1.9

Orbit
Period (P)	8,016 d (21.95 yr)
Eccentricity (e)	0.54
Semi-amplitude (K_{1}) (primary)	11.0 km/s

Details

ξ Aqr A
Mass	1.7^{+0.10}_{−0.07} M_{☉}
Radius	2.76 R_{☉}
Luminosity	36.0±1.1 L_{☉}
Surface gravity (log g)	4.0±0.14 cgs
Temperature	8,140±277 K
Metallicity [Fe/H]	–0.03 dex
Rotational velocity (v sin i)	170 km/s
Age	567^{+239}_{−326} Myr

ξ Aqr B
Mass	0.9±0.6 M_{☉}

Other designations
- Bunda, ξ Aqr, 23 Aqr, BD−08 5701, FK5 1569, HD 205767, HIP 106786, HR 8264, SAO 145537, WDS J21378-0751AB

Database references
SIMBAD	data

Xi Aquarii is a binary star system in the equatorial constellation of Aquarius. Its name is a Bayer designation that is Latinized from ξ Aquarii, and abbreviated Xi Aqr or ξ Aqr. The system is visible to the naked eye as a point of light with an apparent visual magnitude of 4.7. The two components are designated Xi Aquarii A (also named Bunda) and B. Based upon parallax measurements, this system lies at a distance of approximately 179 light-years (55 parsecs) from the Sun. It is drifting closer with a heliocentric radial velocity of –26 km/s. The position of this system near the ecliptic means it is subject to lunar occultation.

Xi Aquarii is a single-lined spectroscopic binary system, which means that the presence of an unseen orbiting companion can be inferred from Doppler shifts in the spectral absorption lines. The two bodies orbit each other with a period of 8,016 days (22 y) and an eccentricity of 0.54. The primary component, Xi Aquarii A, is an A-type main sequence star with a stellar classification of A7 V. It has about 1.7 times the mass of the Sun and is spinning rapidly with a projected rotational velocity of 170 km/s. The star is radiating 36 times the luminosity of the Sun from its photosphere at an effective temperature of 8,140 K.

The orbital data is consistent with the secondary component, Xi Aquarii B, being either a red dwarf or a white dwarf star.

== Nomenclature ==
ξ Aquarii (Latinised to Xi Aquarii) is the binary's Bayer designation. The designations of the two components as Xi Aquarii A and B derive from the convention used by the Washington Multiplicity Catalog (WMC) for multiple star systems, and adopted by the International Astronomical Union (IAU).

Along with Beta Aquarii (Sadalsuud) it constituted the Persian lunar mansion Bunda. In 2016, the IAU organized a Working Group on Star Names (WGSN) to catalog and standardize proper names for stars. The WGSN decided to attribute proper names to individual stars rather than entire multiple systems. It approved the name Bunda for the component Xi Aquarii A on 1 June 2018 and it is now so included in the List of IAU-approved Star Names.

In the catalogue of stars in the Calendarium of Al Achsasi al Mouakket, this star was designated Thanih Saad al Saaoud (ثاني سعد السعود – thānī sa‘d al-su‘ūd), which was translated into Latin as Secunda Fortunæ Fortunarum, meaning "the second of luck of lucks". This star, along with Beta Aquarii and 46 Capricorni, were Saʽd al Suʽud (سعد السعود), "the Luck of Lucks".

In Chinese, 天壘城 (Tiān Lěi Chéng), meaning Celestial Ramparts, refers to an asterism consisting of Xi Aquarii, 46 Capricorni, 47 Capricorni, Lambda Capricorni, 50 Capricorni, 18 Aquarii, 29 Capricorni, 9 Aquarii, 8 Aquarii, Nu Aquarii, 14 Aquarii, 17 Aquarii and 19 Aquarii. Consequently, the Chinese name for Xi Aquarii itself is 天壘城一 (Tiān Lěi Chéng yī, English: the First Star of Celestial Ramparts).
