= Epsilon Aquarii =

Binary star in the constellation Aquarius

- Location of ε Aquarii (circled)

Observation data Epoch J2000 Equinox ICRS
- Constellation: Aquarius
- Right ascension: 20^{h} 47^{m} 40.54957^{s}
- Declination: −09° 29′ 44.7969″
- Apparent magnitude (V): 3.77

Characteristics
- Evolutionary stage: Main sequence or subgiant
- Spectral type: A1 V + KV
- U−B color index: +0.029
- B−V color index: −0.001
- Variable type: Constant

Astrometry
Radial velocity (R_{v})	−19.82±0.58 km/s
Proper motion (μ)	RA: +33.923 mas/yr Dec.: −34.926 mas/yr
Parallax (π)	13.3619±0.3737 mas
Distance	244 ± 7 ly (75 ± 2 pc)
Absolute magnitude (M_{V})	−0.46

Orbit
Primary	A
Name	B
Period (P)	1.2 years
Semi-major axis (a)	25.9 mas 1.7 AU

Details

A
Mass	2.98±0.03 M_{☉}
Radius	4.2 R_{☉}
Luminosity	161±9 L_{☉}
Surface gravity (log g)	3.66±0.14 cgs
Temperature	9,622±327 K
Metallicity [Fe/H]	−0.08±0.35 dex
Rotational velocity (v sin i)	118.0±5.9 km/s
Age	388 Myr

B
Mass	0.61 M_{☉}
Radius	0.57 R_{☉}
Temperature	4,070 K

Other designations
- Albali, ε Aqr, 2 Aquarii, BD−10°5506, FK5 781, HD 198001, HIP 102618, HR 7950, SAO 144810

Database references
SIMBAD	data

Epsilon Aquarii is a binary star system in the equatorial zodiac constellation of Aquarius, located near the western constellation border with Capricornus. Its identifier is a Bayer designation that is Latinized from ε Aquarii, and abbreviated Eps Aqr or ε Aqr, respectively. It has the proper name Albali /ælˈbeɪli/, now formally recognized by the IAU. This system is visible to the naked eye as a point of light with an apparent visual magnitude of 3.77, and has an absolute magnitude of −0.46. Based upon parallax measurements taken by the Gaia spacecraft, it is located at a distance of approximately 244 light-years (75 pc) from Earth. The star is drifting closer with a radial velocity of −20 km/s.

== Properties ==
The primary member has a stellar classification of A1 V, indicating it is an A-type main-sequence star. However, isochrone fitting suggests this star has recently evolved away from the main sequence and is now a subgiant star. It is estimated to be 388 million years old with a high rate of spin, showing a projected rotational velocity of around 118 km/s. The elemental abundances in the stellar atmosphere are close to solar, with pronounced underabundances of aluminium and strontium. The star has three times the mass of the Sun and about 4.2 times the Sun's radius. It is radiating 161 times the luminosity of the Sun from its photosphere at an effective temperature of 9,622 K.

The binary nature of this system was discovered in 2023 based on observations from the European Southern Observatory. The secondary component is a K-type main-sequence star with 0.6 times the mass and 0.57 times the radius of the Sun. Located at a projected separation of 26 milliarcseconds from the primary, this translates to a physical separation of 1.7 astronomical units. Albali A and B complete an orbit around their center of mass each 1.2 years.

== Nomenclature ==
ε Aquarii (Latinised to Epsilon Aquarii) is the star's Bayer designation.

It bore the traditional name, Albali, from the Arabic البالع (albāli‘), meaning "the swallower". (See also Albulaan.) Along with Mu Aquarii (Albulaan) and Nu Aquarii (also Albulaan), they were al Bulaʽ (البلع), meaning "the Swallower". In 2016, the International Astronomical Union organized a Working Group on Star Names (WGSN) to catalogue and standardize proper names for stars. The WGSN approved the name Albali for this star on 12 September 2016, and it is now so included in the List of IAU-approved Star Names.

In the catalogue of stars in the Calendarium of Al Achsasi al Mouakket, it was designated Nir Saad Bula (نير سعد ألبلع nayyir sa'd al bulaʽ), which was translated into Latin as Lucida Fortunæ Dissipantis, meaning "the brightest of luck of the swallower".

In Chinese, 女 (Nǚ), meaning Girl (asterism), refers to an asterism consisting of Epsilon Aquarii, Mu Aquarii, 4 Aquarii, 5 Aquarii and 3 Aquarii. Consequently, the Chinese name for Epsilon Aquarii itself is 女一 (Nǚ yī, English: the First Star of Girl).
