= August 2 =

August 2 this year in various calendars
- Sunday, 2 August 2026
Akan	Monokwasi
Armenian	13 Nawasardi 1476
Aztec	Pānquetzaliztli 4, 10 Malīnalli
Babylonian	18 Du'uzu, 2337 SE
Balinese pawukon	Menga, Kajeng, Laba, Umanis, Maulu, Redite of Merakih, Brahma, Dadi, Pandita
Bengali	18 Shrabon, BS 1433
Chinese	Yang Earth Monkey・Emptiness Mansion; Fire Horse Year, Month 6, Day 20 (Dashu, 5 days until Liqiu)
Common Era	2 August 2026 CE
Coptic	26 Epip, AM 1742
Egyptian	18 Choiak, 2775 NE
Ethiopian	26 Ḥamlē, 2018 Amätä Məhrät
French Republican	Décade II, Quintidi de Thermidor de l'Année 234 de la République
Gregorian	2 August, AD 2026
Hebrew	19 Av, AM 5786
Hindu	Pūrvabhādrapada・Atigaṇḍa; Solar: 17 Śrāvaṇa, 1948 SE; Lunisolar: Caturthī, Kṛishna pakṣa of Āṣāḍha, 2083 VE; Rāudra・5127 KY・1,872,789
Icelandic	Sunnudagur, 8 Heyannir 2026
Islamic	17 Safar, AH 1448 (using tabular method)
ISO week date	2026-W31-7
Japanese	20 Minazuki, Reiwa 8 (Taisho, 5 days until Risshū)
Julian	20 July, AD 2026 (AM 7534)
Julian day	2461255
Korean	20 Yangdal, 4359 DE
Maya	13.0.13.14.12; 5 Yaxkin, 10 Eb
Roman	ante diem XIII Kalendas Augustas, MMDCCLXXIX AUC
Solar Hijri	11 Mordad, SH 1405
Tibetan	19 chu stod, me pho rta 2153 or 1772 or 1000

<<	August					>>
Su	Mo	Tu	We	Th	Fr	Sa
						1
2	3	4	5	6	7	8
9	10	11	12	13	14	15
16	17	18	19	20	21	22
23	24	25	26	27	28	29
30	31
2026

August 2 in recent years
2026 (Sunday)
2025 (Saturday)
2024 (Friday)
2023 (Wednesday)
2022 (Tuesday)
2021 (Monday)
2020 (Sunday)
2019 (Friday)
2018 (Thursday)
2017 (Wednesday)

August 2 is the 214th day of the year (215th in leap years) in the Gregorian calendar; 151 days remain until the end of the year.

== Events ==
=== Pre-1600 ===
- 338 BC – A Macedonian army led by Philip II defeats the combined forces of Athens and Thebes in the Battle of Chaeronea, securing Macedonian hegemony in Greece and the Aegean.
- 216 BC – The Carthaginian army led by Hannibal defeats a numerically superior Roman army at the Battle of Cannae.
- 49 BC – Caesar, who marched to Spain earlier in the year, leaving Marcus Antonius in charge of Italy, defeats Pompey's general Afranius and Petreius in Ilerda (Lerida) north of the Ebro river.
- 47 BC – Julius Caesar defeats Pharnaces II of Pontus in the battle of Zela.
- 461 – Western Roman Emperor Majorian is arrested near Tortona (northern Italy) and deposed by the Suebian general Ricimer.
- 932 – After a two-year siege, the city of Toledo, in Spain, surrenders to the forces of the Caliph of Córdoba Abd al-Rahman III, assuming an important victory in his campaign to subjugate the Central March.
- 1274 – Edward I of England returns from the Ninth Crusade and is crowned King seventeen days later.
- 1343 – After the execution of her husband, Jeanne de Clisson sells her estates and raises a force of men with which to attack French shipping and ports.
- 1377 – Russian troops are defeated by forces of the Blue Horde Khan Arapsha in the Battle on Pyana River.
- 1415 – Thomas Grey is executed for participating in the Southampton Plot.
- 1492 – The Jews are expelled from Spain: 40,000–200,000 leave. Sultan Bayezid II of the Ottoman Empire, learning of this, dispatches the Ottoman Navy to bring the Jews safely to Ottoman lands, mainly to the cities of Thessaloniki (in modern-day Greece) and İzmir (in modern-day Turkey).

=== 1601–1900 ===
- 1610 – During Henry Hudson's search for the Northwest Passage, he sails into what is now known as Hudson Bay.
- 1776 – American Revolution: The signing of the United States Declaration of Independence by the Second Continental Congress takes place.
- 1784 – The first British mail coach service runs from Bristol to London.
- 1790 – The first United States Census is conducted.
- 1798 – French Revolutionary Wars: The Battle of the Nile concludes in a British victory.
- 1830 – July Revolution: Charles X of France abdicates the throne in favor of his grandson Henri.
- 1858 – The Government of India Act 1858 replaces Company rule in India with that of the British Raj.
- 1869 – Japan's Edo society class system is abolished as part of the Meiji Restoration reforms.
- 1870 – Tower Subway, the world's first underground tube railway, opens in London, England, United Kingdom.
- 1873 – The Clay Street Hill Railroad begins operating the first cable car in San Francisco's famous cable car system.
- 1897 – Anglo-Afghan War: The Siege of Malakand ends when a relief column is able to reach the British garrison in the Malakand states.

=== 1901–present ===
- 1903 – The Ilinden–Preobrazhenie Uprising against the Ottoman Empire begins.
- 1909 – End of the Tragic Week in Barcelona, a series of antiwar and antigovernment protests in Spain and especially in Barcelona.
- 1914 – World War I: The German occupation of Luxembourg begins.
- 1916 – World War I: Austrian sabotage causes the sinking of the Italian battleship Leonardo da Vinci in Taranto.
- 1918 – The first general strike in Canadian history takes place in Vancouver.
- 1922 – A typhoon hits Shantou, Republic of China, killing more than 50,000 people.
- 1923 – U.S. Vice President Calvin Coolidge becomes president upon the death of President Warren G. Harding.
- 1932 – The positron (antiparticle of the electron) is discovered by Carl D. Anderson.
- 1934 – Reichskanzler Adolf Hitler becomes Führer of Germany following the death of President Paul von Hindenburg.
- 1937 – The Marihuana Tax Act of 1937 is passed in America, the effect of which is to render marijuana and all its by-products illegal.
- 1939 – Albert Einstein and Leo Szilard write a letter to Franklin D. Roosevelt, urging him to begin the Manhattan Project to develop a nuclear weapon.
- 1943 – The Holocaust: Jewish prisoners stage a revolt at Treblinka, one of the deadliest of Nazi death camps where approximately 900,000 persons were murdered in less than 18 months.
- 1943 – World War II: After the Motor Torpedo Boat PT-109 is rammed and sunk by the Japanese destroyer Amagiri, Lt. John F. Kennedy, future U.S. president, saves all but two of his crew.
- 1944 – ASNOM: Birth of the Socialist Republic of Macedonia, celebrated as Day of the Republic in North Macedonia.
- 1944 – World War II: The largest trade convoy of the world wars arrives safely in the Western Approaches.
- 1945 – World War II: The Potsdam Conference ends.
- 1947 – A British South American Airways Avro Lancastrian airliner crashes into a mountain during a flight from Buenos Aires, Argentina to Santiago, Chile. The wreckage would not be found until 1998.
- 1968 – An earthquake hits Casiguran, Aurora, Philippines killing more than 270 people and wounding 261.
- 1973 – A flash fire kills 50 people at the Summerland amusement centre at Douglas, Isle of Man.
- 1980 – A bomb explodes at the railway station in Bologna, Italy, killing 85 people and wounding more than 200.
- 1982 – The Helsinki Metro, the first rapid transit system of Finland, is opened to the general public.
- 1985 – Delta Air Lines Flight 191, a Lockheed L-1011 TriStar, crashes at Dallas/Fort Worth International Airport killing 137.
- 1989 – Pakistan is re-admitted to the Commonwealth of Nations after having restored democracy for the first time since 1972.
- 1989 – A massacre is carried out by an Indian Peace Keeping Force in Sri Lanka killing 64 ethnic Tamil civilians.
- 1990 – Iraqi invasion of Kuwait: Iraq invades Kuwait and temporarily establishes the Republic of Kuwait puppet state on the orders of Saddam Hussein, eventually leading to the Gulf War.
- 1991 – Space Shuttle Atlantis is launched on STS-43 to deploy the TDRS-5 satellite.
- 1999 – The Gaisal train disaster claims 285 lives in Assam, India.
- 2005 – Air France Flight 358 lands at Toronto Pearson International Airport and runs off the runway, causing the plane to burst into flames, leaving 12 injuries and no fatalities.
- 2014 – At least 146 people are killed and more than 114 injured in a factory explosion in Kunshan, Jiangsu, China.

== Births ==
=== Pre-1600 ===
- 1260 – Kyawswa of Pagan, last ruler of the Pagan Kingdom (died 1299)
- 1455 – John Cicero, Elector of Brandenburg (died 1499)
- 1533 – Theodor Zwinger, Swiss physician and scholar (died 1588)
- 1549 – Mikołaj Krzysztof "the Orphan" Radziwiłł, Polish nobleman (died 1616)

=== 1601–1900 ===
- 1612 – Saskia van Uylenburgh, Dutch model and wife of Rembrandt van Rijn (died 1642)
- 1627 – Samuel Dirksz van Hoogstraten, Dutch painter (died 1678)
- 1630 – Estephan El Douaihy, Maronite patriarch (died 1704)
- 1646 – Jean-Baptiste du Casse, French admiral and buccaneer (died 1715)
- 1672 – Johann Jakob Scheuchzer, Swiss paleontologist and scholar (died 1733)
- 1674 – Philippe II, Duke of Orléans (died 1723)
- 1696 – Mahmud I, Ottoman sultan (died 1754)
- 1702 – Dietrich of Anhalt-Dessau (died 1769)
- 1703 – Lorenzo Ricci, Italian religious leader, 18th Superior General of the Society of Jesus (died 1775)
- 1740 – Jean Baptiste Camille Canclaux, French general (died 1817)
- 1754 – Pierre Charles L'Enfant, French-American architect and engineer, designed Washington, D.C. (died 1825)
- 1788 – Leopold Gmelin, German chemist and academic (died 1853)
- 1815 – Adolf Friedrich von Schack, German poet and historian (died 1894)
- 1820 – John Tyndall, Irish-English physicist and mountaineer (died 1893)
- 1828 – Manuel Pavía y Rodríguez de Alburquerque, Spanish general (died 1895)
- 1834 – Frédéric Auguste Bartholdi, French sculptor, designed the Statue of Liberty (died 1904)
- 1835 – Elisha Gray, American businessman, co-founded Western Electric (died 1901)
- 1861 – Prafulla Chandra Ray, Indian chemist and academic (died 1944)
- 1865 – Irving Babbitt, American academic and critic (died 1933)
- 1865 – John Radecki, Australian stained glass artist (died 1955)
- 1867 – Ernest Dowson, English poet, novelist, and short story writer (died 1900)
- 1868 – Constantine I of Greece (died 1923)
- 1870 – Marianne Weber, German sociologist and suffragist (died 1954)
- 1871 – John French Sloan, American painter and illustrator (died 1951)
- 1872 – George E. Stewart, Australian-American colonel, Medal of Honor recipient (died 1946)
- 1876 – Pingali Venkayya, Indian geologist, designed the Flag of India (died 1963)
- 1877 – Ravishankar Shukla, Indian lawyer and politician, 1st Chief Minister of Madhya Pradesh (died 1956)
- 1878 – Aino Kallas, Finnish-Estonian author (died 1956)
- 1880 – Arthur Dove, American painter and educator (died 1946)
- 1882 – Red Ames, American baseball player and manager (died 1936)
- 1882 – Albert Bloch, American painter and academic (died 1961)
- 1884 – Rómulo Gallegos, Venezuelan author and politician, 46th President of Venezuela (died 1969)
- 1886 – John Alexander Douglas McCurdy, Canadian pilot and politician, 20th Lieutenant Governor of Nova Scotia (died 1961)
- 1887 – Oskar Anderson, Bulgarian-German mathematician and statistician (died 1960)
- 1889 – Margaret Lawrence, American stage actress (died 1929)
- 1891 – Arthur Bliss, English composer and conductor (died 1975)
- 1891 – Viktor Zhirmunsky, Russian linguist and historian (died 1971)
- 1892 – Jack L. Warner, Canadian-born American production manager and producer, co-founded Warner Bros. (died 1978)
- 1894 – Bertha Lutz, Brazilian feminist and scientist (died 1976)
- 1895 – Matt Henderson, New Zealand cricketer (died 1970)
- 1897 – Karl-Otto Koch, German SS officer (died 1945)
- 1897 – Max Weber, Swiss lawyer and politician (died 1974)
- 1898 – Ernő Nagy, Hungarian fencer (died 1977)
- 1899 – Charles Bennett, English director and screenwriter (died 1995)
- 1900 – Holling C. Holling, American author and illustrator (died 1973)
- 1900 – Helen Morgan, American actress and singer (died 1941)

=== 1901–present ===
- 1902 – Pope Cyril VI of Alexandria (died 1971)
- 1902 – Mina Rees, American mathematician (died 1997)
- 1905 – Karl Amadeus Hartmann, German composer (died 1963)
- 1905 – Myrna Loy, American actress (died 1993)
- 1905 – Ruth Nelson, American actress (died 1992)
- 1907 – Mary Hamman, American journalist and author (died 1984)
- 1910 – Roger MacDougall, Scottish director, playwright, and screenwriter (died 1993)
- 1911 – Ann Dvorak, American actress (died 1979)
- 1912 – Palle Huld, Danish actor (died 2010)
- 1912 – Håkon Stenstadvold, Norwegian painter, illustrator, and critic (died 1977)
- 1912 – Vladimir Žerjavić, Croatian economist and author (died 2001)
- 1913 – Xavier Thaninayagam, Sri Lankan scholar and academic (died 1980)
- 1914 – Félix Leclerc, Canadian singer-songwriter, actor, and poet (died 1988)
- 1914 – Big Walter Price, American singer-songwriter and pianist (died 2012)
- 1914 – Beatrice Straight, American actress (died 2001)
- 1915 – Gary Merrill, American actor (died 1990)
- 1916 – Alfonso A. Ossorio, Filipino-American painter and sculptor (died 1990)
- 1917 – Wah Chang, Chinese-American artist and designer (died 2003)
- 1919 – Nehemiah Persoff, Israeli-American actor (died 2022)
- 1920 – Louis Pauwels, French journalist and author (died 1997)
- 1920 – Augustus Rowe, Canadian physician and politician (died 2013)
- 1921 – George Wilson, American comics artist (died 1998)
- 1922 – Betsy Bloomingdale, American philanthropist and socialite (died 2016)
- 1922 – Geoffrey Dutton, Australian historian and author (died 1998)
- 1922 – Len Murray, British trade union leader (died 2004)
- 1923 – Shimon Peres, Polish-Israeli lawyer and politician, 9th President of Israel (died 2016)
- 1923 – Ike Williams, American boxer (died 1994)
- 1924 – James Baldwin, American novelist, poet, and critic (died 1987)
- 1924 – Joe Harnell, American pianist and composer (died 2005)
- 1924 – Carroll O'Connor, American actor, director, producer, and screenwriter (died 2001)
- 1925 – K. Arulanandan, Ceylon-American engineer and academic (died 2004)
- 1925 – John Dexter, English director and producer (died 1990)
- 1925 – John McCormack, Canadian ice hockey player (died 2017)
- 1925 – Jorge Rafael Videla, Argentinian general and politician, 43rd President of Argentina (died 2013)
- 1926 – Annie Geeraerts, Belgian actress
- 1926 – Geles Cabrera, Mexican sculptor (died 2026)
- 1927 – Peter Swinnerton-Dyer, English mathematician and academic (died 2018)
- 1928 – Malcolm Hilton, English cricketer (died 1990)
- 1929 – Roy Crimmins, English trombonist and composer (died 2014)
- 1929 – John Gale, English director and producer (died 2025)
- 1929 – Vidya Charan Shukla, Indian politician, Indian Minister of External Affairs (died 2013)
- 1929 – David Waddington, Baron Waddington, English lawyer and politician, Governor of Bermuda (died 2017)
- 1929 – K. M. Peyton, British children's author (died 2023)
- 1930 – Vali Myers, Australian painter and dancer (died 2003)
- 1931 – Pierre DuMaine, American bishop and academic (died 2019)
- 1931 – Eddie Fuller, South African cricketer (died 2008)
- 1931 – Karl Miller, English journalist and critic (died 2014)
- 1931 – Viliam Schrojf, Czech footballer (died 2007)
- 1932 – Lamar Hunt, American businessman, co-founded the American Football League and World Championship Tennis (died 2006)
- 1932 – Peter O'Toole, British-Irish actor and producer (died 2013)
- 1933 – Ioannis Varvitsiotis, Greek politician, Greek Minister of Defence
- 1934 – Valery Bykovsky, Russian general and cosmonaut (died 2019)
- 1935 – Hank Cochran, American singer-songwriter and guitarist (died 2010)
- 1936 – Anthony Payne, English composer and author (died 2021)
- 1937 – Ron Brierley, New Zealand businessman
- 1937 – Billy Cannon, American football player and dentist (died 2018)
- 1937 – María Duval, Mexican actress and singer
- 1937 – Garth Hudson, Canadian keyboard player, songwriter, and producer (died 2025)
- 1937 – Tim Bowden, Australian historian and television presenter (died 2024)
- 1938 – Dave Balon, Canadian ice hockey player and coach (died 2007)
- 1938 – Pierre de Bané, Israeli-Canadian lawyer and politician (died 2019)
- 1938 – Terry Peck, Falkland Islander soldier (died 2006)
- 1939 – Benjamin Barber, American theorist, author, and academic (died 2017)
- 1939 – Wes Craven, American director, producer, and screenwriter (died 2015)
- 1939 – John W. Snow, American businessman and politician, 73rd United States Secretary of the Treasury
- 1940 – Angel Lagdameo, Filipino archbishop (died 2022)
- 1940 – Beko Ransome-Kuti, Nigerian physician and activist (died 2006)
- 1940 – Will Tura, Belgian singer-songwriter and guitarist
- 1941 – Doris Coley, American singer (died 2000)
- 1941 – Jules A. Hoffmann, Luxembourgish-French biologist and academic, Nobel Prize laureate
- 1941 – François Weyergans, Belgian director and screenwriter (died 2022)
- 1942 – Isabel Allende, Chilean-American novelist, essayist, essayist
- 1942 – Leo Beenhakker, Dutch football manager (died 2025)
- 1942 – Juan Formell, Cuban singer-songwriter and bass player (died 2014)
- 1942 – Nell Irvin Painter, American author and historian
- 1943 – Herbert M. Allison, American lieutenant and businessman (died 2013)
- 1943 – Tom Burgmeier, American baseball player and coach
- 1943 – Jon R. Cavaiani, English-American sergeant, Medal of Honor recipient (died 2014)
- 1943 – Rose Tremain, English novelist and short story writer
- 1944 – Jim Capaldi, English drummer and singer-songwriter (died 2005)
- 1944 – Naná Vasconcelos, Brazilian singer and berimbau player (died 2016)
- 1945 – Joanna Cassidy, American actress
- 1945 – Alex Jesaulenko, Austrian-Australian footballer and coach
- 1945 – Bunker Roy, Indian educator and activist
- 1945 – Eric Simms, Australian rugby league player and coach
- 1946 – James Howe, American journalist and author
- 1947 – Ruth Bakke, Norwegian organist and composer
- 1947 – Lawrence Wright, American journalist, author, and screenwriter
- 1948 – Andy Fairweather Low, Welsh singer-songwriter, guitarist, and producer
- 1948 – Dennis Prager, American radio host and author
- 1948 – Tapan Kumar Sarkar, Indian-American electrical engineer and academic (died 2021)
- 1948 – James Street, American football and baseball player (died 2013)
- 1948 – Snoo Wilson, English playwright and screenwriter (died 2013)
- 1949 – James Fallows, American journalist and author
- 1949 – Bertalan Farkas, Hungarian general and cosmonaut
- 1950 – Jussi Adler-Olsen, Danish author and publisher
- 1950 – Sue Rodriguez, Canadian assisted suicide advocate, diagnosed with ALS (died 1994)
- 1950 – Ted Turner, British guitarist
- 1950 – Alberto Iribarne, Argentine lawyer and politician (died 2026)
- 1951 – Andrew Gold, American singer-songwriter and producer (died 2011)
- 1951 – Steve Hillage, English singer-songwriter and guitarist
- 1951 – Burgess Owens, American football player and politician
- 1951 – Joe Lynn Turner, American singer-songwriter and guitarist
- 1951 – Per Westerberg, Swedish businessman and politician, Speaker of the Parliament of Sweden
- 1952 – Alain Giresse, French footballer and manager
- 1953 – Donnie Munro, Scottish singer and guitarist
- 1953 – Butch Patrick, American actor
- 1953 – Anthony Seldon, English historian and author
- 1954 – Sammy McIlroy, Northern Irish footballer and manager
- 1955 – Caleb Carr, American historian and author (died 2024)
- 1955 – Tony Godden, English footballer and manager
- 1955 – Butch Vig, American drummer, songwriter, and record producer
- 1956 – Fulvio Melia, Italian-American physicist, astrophysicist, and author
- 1957 – Jacky Rosen, United States senator
- 1959 – Jim Doughan, American actor
- 1959 – Victoria Jackson, American actress and singer
- 1959 – Johnny Kemp, Bahamian singer-songwriter and producer (died 2015)
- 1959 – Apollonia Kotero, American singer and actress
- 1960 – Linda Fratianne, American figure skater
- 1960 – Neal Morse, American singer and keyboard player
- 1960 – David Yow, American singer-songwriter
- 1961 – Pete de Freitas, Trinidadian-British drummer and producer (died 1989)
- 1961 – Cui Jian, Chinese singer-songwriter
- 1962 – Lee Mavers, English singer, songwriter and guitarist
- 1962 – Cynthia Stevenson, American actress
- 1963 – Laura Bennett, American architect and fashion designer
- 1963 – Uğur Tütüneker, Turkish footballer and manager
- 1964 – Frank Biela, German race car driver
- 1964 – Mary-Louise Parker, American actress
- 1965 – Joe Hockey, Australian lawyer and politician, 38th Treasurer of Australia
- 1965 – Hisanobu Watanabe, Japanese baseball player and coach
- 1966 – Takashi Iizuka, Japanese wrestler
- 1966 – Grainne Leahy, Irish cricketer
- 1966 – Tim Wakefield, American baseball player and sportscaster (died 2023)
- 1967 – Aaron Krickstein, American tennis player
- 1967 – Aline Brosh McKenna, American screenwriter and producer
- 1968 – Stefan Effenberg, German footballer and sportscaster
- 1968 – Chrystia Freeland, Canadian politician and journalist
- 1969 – Cedric Ceballos, American basketball player
- 1969 – Fernando Couto, Portuguese footballer and manager
- 1970 – Tony Amonte, American ice hockey player and coach
- 1970 – Kevin Smith, American actor, director, producer, and screenwriter
- 1970 – Philo Wallace, Barbadian cricketer
- 1971 – Jason Bell, Australian rugby league player
- 1971 – Michael Hughes, Irish footballer and manager
- 1972 – Mohamed Al-Deayea, Saudi Arabian footballer
- 1972 – Muriel Bowser, American politician, Mayor of Washington, D.C.
- 1973 – Danie Keulder, Namibian cricketer
- 1973 – Miguel Mendonça, Zimbabwean journalist and author
- 1973 – Susie O'Neill, Australian swimmer
- 1974 – Phil Williams, English journalist and radio host
- 1975 – Mineiro, Brazilian footballer
- 1975 – Xu Huaiwen, Chinese-German badminton player and coach
- 1975 – Tamás Molnár, Hungarian water polo player
- 1976 – Reyes Estévez, Spanish runner
- 1976 – Jay Heaps, American soccer player and coach
- 1976 – Michael Weiss, American figure skater
- 1976 – Pritam Singh, Singaporean lawyer and politician
- 1976 – Sam Worthington, English-Australian actor and producer
- 1976 – Mohammad Zahid, Pakistani cricketer
- 1977 – Edward Furlong, American actor
- 1978 – Goran Gavrančić, Serbian footballer
- 1978 – Matt Guerrier, American baseball player
- 1978 – Deividas Šemberas, Lithuanian footballer
- 1978 – Dragan Vukmir, Serbian footballer
- 1979 – Marco Bonura, Italian footballer
- 1979 – Reuben Kosgei, Kenyan runner
- 1980 – Ivica Banović, Croatian footballer
- 1981 – Alexander Emelianenko, Russian mixed martial artist and boxer
- 1981 – Tim Murtagh, English-Irish cricketer
- 1982 – Hélder Postiga, Portuguese footballer
- 1982 – Kerry Rhodes, American football player
- 1982 – Grady Sizemore, American baseball player
- 1983 – Michel Bastos, Brazilian footballer
- 1983 – Huston Street, American baseball player
- 1984 – Giampaolo Pazzini, Italian footballer
- 1984 – JD Vance, American politician, 50th vice president of the United States
- 1985 – Stephen Ferris, Irish rugby player
- 1985 – David Hart Smith, Canadian wrestler
- 1986 – Mathieu Razanakolona, Canadian skier
- 1986 – Lily Gladstone, American actress
- 1988 – Rob Kwiet, Canadian ice hockey player
- 1988 – Golden Tate, American football player
- 1989 – Nacer Chadli, Belgian footballer
- 1990 – Ima Bohush, Belarusian tennis player
- 1990 – Vitalia Diatchenko, Russian tennis player
- 1990 – Skylar Diggins, American basketball player
- 1991 – Evander Kane, Canadian ice hockey player
- 1992 – Charli XCX, English singer-songwriter
- 1993 – Gael Bussa, Congolese politician
- 1993 – Joey Florez, American scholar and cultural critic
- 1994 – Emil Krafth, Swedish footballer
- 1994 – Laura Pigossi, Brazilian tennis player
- 1994 – Laremy Tunsil, American football player
- 1994 – MoistCr1tikal, American YouTuber and streamer
- 1995 – Kristaps Porziņģis, Latvian basketball player
- 1995 – Vikkstar123, English internet personality
- 1996 – Keston Hiura, American baseball player
- 1996 – Simone Manuel, American swimmer
- 1997 – Austin Theory, American wrestler
- 1999 – Anastasios Douvikas, Greek footballer
- 1999 – Mark Lee, Korean-Canadian singer
- 1999 – Joël Piroe, Dutch-Surinamese footballer
- 2000 – Varvara Gracheva, Russian tennis player
- 2000 – Mohammed Kudus, Ghanaian footballer
- 2006 – Héctor Fort, Spanish footballer

== Deaths ==
=== Pre-1600 ===
- 216 BC – Gnaeus Servilius Geminus, Roman consul
- 216 BC – Lucius Aemilius Paullus, Roman consul and general
- 216 BC – Marcus Minucius Rufus, Roman consul
- 257 – Pope Stephen I
- 575 – Ahudemmeh, Syriac Orthodox Grand Metropolitan of the East.
- 640 – Pope Severinus
- 686 – Pope John V
- 855 – Ahmad ibn Hanbal, Arab theologian and jurist (born 780)
- 924 – Ælfweard of Wessex (born 904)
- 1075 – Patriarch John VIII of Constantinople
- 1100 – William II of England (born 1056)
- 1222 – Raymond VI, Count of Toulouse (born 1156)
- 1277 – Mu'in al-Din Sulaiman Pervane, Chancellor and Regent of the Sultanate of Rum
- 1316 – Louis of Burgundy (born 1297)
- 1330 – Yolande of Dreux, Queen consort of Scotland and Duchess consort of Brittany (born 1263)
- 1332 – King Christopher II of Denmark (born 1276)
- 1415 – Thomas Grey, English conspirator (born 1384)
- 1445 – Oswald von Wolkenstein, Austrian poet and composer (born 1376)
- 1451 – Elizabeth of Görlitz (born 1390)
- 1511 – Andrew Barton, Scottish admiral (born 1466)
- 1512 – Alessandro Achillini, Italian physician and philosopher (born 1463)
- 1589 – Henry III of France (born 1551)

=== 1601–1900 ===
- 1605 – Richard Leveson, English admiral (born c. 1570)
- 1611 – Katō Kiyomasa, Japanese daimyō (born 1562)
- 1667 – Francesco Borromini, Swiss architect, designed San Carlo alle Quattro Fontane and Sant'Agnese in Agone (born 1599)
- 1696 – Robert Campbell of Glenlyon (born 1630)
- 1769 – Daniel Finch, 8th Earl of Winchilsea, English politician, Lord President of the Council (born 1689)
- 1788 – Thomas Gainsborough, English painter (born 1727)
- 1796 – Sir Robert Pigot, 2nd Baronet, English colonel and politician (born 1720)
- 1799 – Jacques-Étienne Montgolfier, French inventor, co-invented the hot air balloon (born 1745)
- 1815 – Guillaume Brune, French general and politician (born 1763)
- 1823 – Lazare Carnot, French mathematician, general, and politician, president of the National Convention (born 1753)
- 1834 – Harriet Arbuthnot, English diarist (born 1793)
- 1849 – Muhammad Ali of Egypt, Ottoman Albanian commander (born 1769)
- 1854 – Heinrich Clauren, German author (born 1771)
- 1859 – Horace Mann, American educator and politician (born 1796)
- 1876 – "Wild Bill" Hickok, American sheriff (born 1837)
- 1889 – Eduardo Gutiérrez, Argentinian author (born 1851)
- 1890 – Louise-Victorine Ackermann, French poet and author (born 1813)

=== 1901–present ===
- 1903 – Eduard Magnus Jakobson, Estonian missionary and engraver (born 1847)
- 1903 – Edmond Nocard, French veterinarian and microbiologist (born 1850)
- 1911 – Ioryi Mucitano, Aromanian revolutionary
- 1913 – Ferenc Pfaff, Hungarian architect and academic, designed Zagreb Central Station (born 1851)
- 1915 – John Downer, Australian politician, 16th premier of South Australia (born 1843)
- 1921 – Enrico Caruso, Italian tenor and actor (born 1873)
- 1922 – Alexander Graham Bell, Scottish-Canadian engineer, invented the telephone (born 1847)
- 1923 – Warren G. Harding, American journalist and politician, 29th president of the United States (born 1865)
- 1923 – Joseph Whitty, Irish Republican died on hunger strike during the 1923 Irish Hunger Strikes (born 1904)
- 1934 – Paul von Hindenburg, German field marshal and politician, 2nd president of Germany (born 1847)
- 1937 – Artur Sirk, Estonian soldier, lawyer, and politician (born 1900)
- 1939 – Harvey Spencer Lewis, American mystic and author (born 1883)
- 1945 – Pietro Mascagni, Italian composer and educator (born 1863)
- 1955 – Alfred Lépine, Canadian ice hockey player and coach (born 1901)
- 1955 – Wallace Stevens, American poet and educator (born 1879)
- 1963 – Oliver La Farge, American anthropologist and author (born 1901)
- 1967 – Walter Terence Stace, English-American epistemologist, philosopher, and academic (born 1886)
- 1970 – Angus MacFarlane-Grieve, English academic, mathematician, rower, and soldier (born 1891)
- 1972 – Brian Cole, American bass player (born 1942)
- 1972 – Paul Goodman, American psychotherapist and author (born 1911)
- 1972 – Helen Hoyt, American poet and author (born 1887)
- 1973 – Ismail Abdul Rahman, Former Deputy Prime Minister of Malaysia (born 1915)
- 1973 – Jean-Pierre Melville, French actor, director, producer, and screenwriter (born 1917)
- 1974 – Douglas Hawkes, English race car driver and businessman (born 1893)
- 1976 – László Kalmár, Hungarian mathematician and academic (born 1905)
- 1976 – Fritz Lang, Austrian-American director, producer, and screenwriter (born 1890)
- 1978 – Carlos Chávez, Mexican composer and conductor (born 1899)
- 1978 – Antony Noghès, French businessman, founded the Monaco Grand Prix (born 1890)
- 1979 – Thurman Munson, American baseball player (born 1947)
- 1981 – Kieran Doherty, Irish republican, died on hunger strike (born 1955)
- 1981 – Stefanie Clausen, Danish diver (born 1900)
- 1983 – James Jamerson, American bass player (born 1936)
- 1986 – Roy Cohn, American lawyer and politician (born 1927)
- 1988 – Joe Carcione, American activist and author (born 1914)
- 1988 – Raymond Carver, American short story writer and poet (born 1938)
- 1990 – Norman Maclean, American short story writer and essayist (born 1902)
- 1990 – Edwin Richfield, English actor and screenwriter (born 1921)
- 1992 – Michel Berger, French singer-songwriter and producer (born 1947)
- 1996 – Michel Debré, French lawyer and politician, 150th prime minister of France (born 1912)
- 1996 – Obdulio Varela, Uruguayan footballer and manager (born 1917)
- 1996 – Mohamed Farrah Aidid, Somali general and politician, 5th president of Somalia (born 1934)
- 1996 – Sergey Golovkin, Russian serial killer and rapist, last person executed by Russia (born 1959)
- 1997 – William S. Burroughs, American novelist, short story writer, and essayist (born 1914)
- 1997 – Harald Kihle, Norwegian painter and illustrator (born 1905)
- 1997 – Fela Kuti, Nigerian singer-songwriter and activist (born 1938)
- 1998 – Shari Lewis, American television host and puppeteer (born 1933)
- 1999 – Willie Morris, American writer (born 1934)
- 2003 – Peter Safar, Austrian-American physician and academic (born 1924)
- 2004 – Ferenc Berényi, Hungarian painter and academic (born 1929)
- 2004 – François Craenhals, Belgian illustrator (born 1926)
- 2004 – Heinrich Mark, Estonian lawyer and politician, 5th prime minister of Estonia in exile (born 1911)
- 2005 – Steven Vincent, American journalist and author (born 1955)
- 2007 – Chauncey Bailey, American journalist (born 1950)
- 2008 – Fujio Akatsuka, Japanese illustrator (born 1935)
- 2011 – José Sanchis Grau, Spanish author and illustrator (born 1932)
- 2012 – Gabriel Horn, English biologist and academic (born 1927)
- 2012 – Magnus Isacsson, Canadian director and producer (born 1948)
- 2012 – Jimmy Jones, American singer-songwriter (born 1930)
- 2012 – John Keegan, English historian and journalist (born 1934)
- 2012 – Bernd Meier, German footballer (born 1972)
- 2012 – Marguerite Piazza, American soprano (born 1920)
- 2013 – Julius L. Chambers, American lawyer and activist (born 1936)
- 2013 – Richard E. Dauch, American businessman, co-founded American Axle (born 1942)
- 2013 – Alla Kushnir, Russian–Israeli chess player (born 1941)
- 2014 – Ed Joyce, American journalist (born 1932)
- 2014 – Billie Letts, American author and educator (born 1938)
- 2014 – Barbara Prammer, Austrian social worker and politician (born 1954)
- 2014 – James Thompson, American-Finnish author (born 1964)
- 2015 – Forrest Bird, American pilot and engineer (born 1921)
- 2015 – Giovanni Conso, Italian jurist and politician, Italian Minister of Justice (born 1922)
- 2015 – Piet Fransen, Dutch footballer (born 1936)
- 2015 – Jack Spring, American baseball player (born 1933)
- 2016 – Terence Bayler, New Zealand actor (born 1930)
- 2016 – David Huddleston, American actor (born 1930)
- 2016 – Franciszek Macharski, Polish cardinal (born 1927)
- 2016 – Ahmed Zewail, Egyptian-American chemist and academic, Nobel Prize laureate (born 1946)
- 2017 – Judith Jones, American literary and cookbook editor (born 1924)
- 2020 – Suzanne Perlman, Hungarian-Dutch visual artist (born 1922)
- 2022 – Vin Scully, American sportscaster and game show host (born 1927)
- 2023 – Nitin Chandrakant Desai, Indian art director, production designer, and film and television producer (born 1965)

== Holidays and observances ==
- Christian feast day:
  - Ahudemmeh (Syriac Orthodox Church).
  - Basil Fool for Christ (Russian Orthodox Church)
  - Ceferino Giménez Malla
  - Centola and Helen
  - Joan of Aza
  - Justin Russolillo
  - Peter Julian Eymard
  - Plegmund
  - Pope Stephen I
  - Portiuncola Indulgence ("Pardon of Assisi"), the plenary indulgence related to St. Francis of Assisi (Catholic Church).
  - Samuel David Ferguson (Episcopal Church)
  - August 2 (Eastern Orthodox liturgics)
- Day of Azerbaijani cinema (Azerbaijan)
- Our Lady of the Angels Day (Costa Rica)
- Paratroopers Day (Russia)
- Republic Day (North Macedonia)
- Romani genocide-related observances, including:
  - Roma Holocaust Memorial Day (Council of Europe, European Parliament)
