= Mu Aquarii =

Binary star system in the constellation Aquarius

- Location of μ Aquarii (circled)

Observation data Epoch J2000 Equinox ICRS
- Constellation: Aquarius
- Right ascension: 20^{h} 52^{m} 39.23277^{s}
- Declination: −08° 58′ 59.9499″
- Apparent magnitude (V): 4.731

Characteristics
- Evolutionary stage: main sequence
- Spectral type: A3m or kA4hF1mF3 (III) EuSr
- U−B color index: +0.149
- B−V color index: +0.322

Astrometry
| Radial velocity (R_{v}) | −9.1 km/s |
| Proper motion (μ) | RA: +45.75 mas/yr Dec.: −33.59 mas/yr |
| Parallax (π) | 20.74±0.29 mas |
| Distance | 157 ± 2 ly (48.2 ± 0.7 pc) |
| Absolute magnitude (M_{V}) | +1.31 |

Orbit
| Period (P) | 2.404±0.002 yr |
| Semi-major axis (a) | 0.0565±0.0008 |
| Eccentricity (e) | 0.150±0.024 |
| Inclination (i) | 85.7±1.2° |
| Longitude of the node (Ω) | 136.6±0.7° |
| Periastron epoch (T) | 2018.973±0.068 |
| Argument of periastron (ω) (secondary) | 308.0±9.8° |
| Semi-amplitude (K_{1}) (primary) | 3.2±0.6 km/s |

Details

A
| Mass | 2.059±0.103 M_{☉} |
| Radius | 3.151±0.158 R_{☉} |
| Luminosity | 20.3 L_{☉} |
| Surface gravity (log g) | 3.68 cgs |
| Temperature | 7,090 K |
| Metallicity [Fe/H] | −0.51 dex |
| Rotational velocity (v sin i) | 53.7 km/s |
| Age | 1.03 Gyr |

Other designations
- μ Aqr, 6 Aquarii, BD−09 5598, FK5 1547, HD 198743, HIP 103045, HR 7990, SAO 144895, WDS 20527-0859A

Database references
| SIMBAD | data |

Mu Aquarii is the a binary star system in the equatorial constellation of Aquarius. Its name is a Bayer designation that is Latinized from μ Aquarii, and abbreviated Mu Aqr or μ Aqr. The star is visible to the naked eye with a combined apparent visual magnitude of 4.7. Based upon parallax measurements, the distance to this system is about 157 light-years (48 parsecs). It is drifting closer to the Sun with a radial velocity of −9.1 km/s.

This star was tentatively identified as a single-lined spectroscopic binary by Helmut A. Abt in 1961. It has an orbital period of 2.404 years and an eccentricity (ovalness) of 0.150. The pair have been resolved by speckle interferometry, showing an angular separation of 0.06″.

The visible spectrum matches a stellar classification of A3m, with the 'm' suffix indicating that this is an Am, or chemically peculiar star. A 2020 classification of kA4hF1mF3 (III) EuSr, indicates ionized calcium (k) lines match a class of A4, hydrogen lines (h) a class of F1, and metal lines (m) F3. There are also abundance anomalies of europium (Eu) and strontium (Sr). The primary has double the mass of the Sun and 3.5 times the Sun's radius, It is radiating 20 times the luminosity of the Sun from its photosphere at an effective temperature of 7,090 K.

This star together with ν Aquarii is Albulaan /ˌælbjəˈlɑːn/, derived from an Arabic term al-bulaʽān (ألبولعان) meaning "the two swallowers". This star, along with ε Aqr (Albali) and ν Aqr (Albulaan), were al Bulaʽ (البلع), the Swallower. In Chinese, 女宿 (Nǚ Xiù), meaning Girl (asterism) (or Woman), refers to an asterism consisting of μ Aquarii, ε Aquarii, 4 Aquarii, 5 Aquarii and 3 Aquarii. Consequently, the Chinese name for μ Aquarii itself is 女宿二 (Nǚ Xiù èr, English: the Second Star of Girl / Woman.)
