= C Capricorni =

c Capricorni can refer to two different stars:

- c^{1} Capricorni or 46 Capricorni, commonly called simply c Capricorni
- c^{2} Capricorni or 47 Capricorni.
