= Árpád Ferenczy =

Hungarian journalist

Árpád Ferenczy (1877-c. 1933) was a legal writer, law professor and Buddhist monk.

He studied law until 1901, later a librarian at the Parliamentary Library. From 1902 he taught law in Sárospatak. From 1903, he was a university professor at Kolozsvár and then from 1909 in Budapest. During his legal literary operation, he first wrote about international law. In his public work, he was a proponent of civil democracy, studying some English legal institutions. During World War I, he was a war correspondent in the Western Theater, then traveled to India and Ceylon. He came to Buddhist faith, and then he became a member of the Church as a monk.

== Major works ==
=== Politics ===
- A nemzetközi választott bíróságok múltja, jelenje és jövője (Bp., 1902)
- A politika rendszere. Alkotmány- és közigazgatástan (Bp., 1905)
- A semlegesség elmélete (Bp., 1907)
- Honosság, illetőség és lakóhely a nemzetközi magánjogban (Bp., 1908)
- Conflict of laws in Hungary.
- A nemzetközi magánjog kézikönyve (Bp., 1911)
- Az angol parlamenti szólásjog és jegyelem történeti fejlődése és jelen állapota. 1547–1914 (Bp., 1914)

=== Eastern philosophy ===
==== Towards Nirvana ====
- A bölcsesség iskolája (Légrády, 1918)
- Bráma éjszakája I-II. (Légrády, 1918)

=== Other writings ===
- Timotheus Thümmel und seine Ameisen (Berlin, 1923)
- The Ants of Timothy Thummel (London, 1924) - English translation of book listed above
- Kunala, an Indian Fantasy (London, 1925)
- Revue philosophique
- Revue d'éconimie politique
- Archives d'anthropologie criminelle

– Descamps: Essai sur l'Organisation de l'arbitrage international
