= Beta Aquarii =

Double star in the constellation Aquarius

- Location of β Aquarii (circled)

Observation data Epoch J2000 Equinox ICRS
- Constellation: Aquarius
- Right ascension: 21^{h} 31^{m} 33.53171^{s}
- Declination: −05° 34′ 16.2320″
- Apparent magnitude (V): 2.87

Characteristics
- Evolutionary stage: Yellow supergiant
- Spectral type: G0 Ib
- U−B color index: +0.58
- B−V color index: +0.84

Astrometry
| Radial velocity (R_{v}) | 6.451±0.0627 km/s |
| Proper motion (μ) | RA: +18.77 mas/yr Dec.: −8.21 mas/yr |
| Parallax (π) | 5.9728±0.2147 mas |
| Distance | 541.8+18.4 −15.5 ly (166.12+5.64 −4.75 pc) |
| Absolute magnitude (M_{V}) | −3.04 |

Details
| Mass | 4.97±0.10 – 6.3 M_{☉} |
| Radius | 47.88+1.68 −1.81 R_{☉} |
| Luminosity | 2046±180 L_{☉} |
| Surface gravity (log g) | 2.05 cgs |
| Temperature | 5608±71 K |
| Metallicity [Fe/H] | −0.03 dex |
| Rotational velocity (v sin i) | 6.3±1.3 km/s |
| Age | 56 – 110±10 Myr |

Other designations
- Sadalsuud, Saad el Sund, β Aqr, 22 Aqr, BD−06 5770, FK5 808, GC 30137, HD 204867, HIP 106278, HR 8232, SAO 145457, ADS 15050 A, CCDM J21316-0534A

Database references
| SIMBAD | data |

Beta Aquarii is a single yellow supergiant star in the constellation of Aquarius. It has the official name Sadalsuud (/ˌsædəlˈsuːəd/) and the Bayer designation β Aquarii, abbreviated Beta Aqr or β Aqr. Based upon parallax measurements obtained during the Hipparcos mission, this component is located at a distance of approximately 540 light years (165 parsecs) from the Sun. It is drifting further away with a radial velocity of 6.5 km/s. The star serves as an IAU radial velocity standard.

== Nomenclature ==
β Aquarii, Latinised to Beta Aquarii, is the star's Bayer designation.

It bore the traditional name Sadalsuud, from an Arabic expression سعد السعود (sa‘d al-su‘ūd), the "luck of lucks". Other spellings that were sometimes encountered were Sad es Saud, Sadalsund, and Saad el Sund. In the catalogue of stars in the Calendarium of Al Achsasi Al Mouakket, this star was designated Nir Saad al Saaoud, which was translated into Latin as Lucida Fortunæ Fortunarum (rather identic with R.H. Allen), meaning the brightest of luck of lucks. The International Astronomical Union Working Group on Star Names (WGSN) has approved the name Sadalsuud for the primary or 'A' component.

In Chinese, 虚宿 (Xū Xiù), meaning Emptiness (asterism), refers to an asterism consisting of Beta Aquarii and Alpha Equulei. Consequently, the Chinese name for Beta Aquarii itself is 虛宿一 (Xū Xiù Yī, English: the First Star of Emptiness).

Sadalsuud is found in Hindu texts as Kalpeny and, in the context of the ancient Indian system of astronomy, Jyotisha Veda, is located in the 23rd Nakshatra Shravishthā, a lunar mansion which is ruled by Eight vasus - the "deities of earthly abundance" . On the Euphrates, Sadalsuud was known as Kakkab Nammax, the Star of Mighty Destiny; that may have given origin to the title of the manzil, as well as to the astrologers' name for it — Fortuna Fortunarum.

== Properties ==
β Aquarii is the brightest star in Aquarius with an apparent magnitude of 2.87 and a stellar classification of G0 Ib. Since 1943, the spectrum of this star has served as one of the stable anchor points by which other stars are classified. It has an estimated age of 56 million years; old enough for a star of this mass to evolve into a supergiant. The star has about five or six times the mass of the Sun, but it has expanded to 48 times the Sun's radius. It is most likely fusing helium into carbon in its core, and, with insufficient mass to explode as a supernova, will likely end up as a massive white dwarf comparable to Sirius B. It is emitting roughly 2,000 times the Sun's luminosity from its enlarged photosphere at an effective temperature of 5,608 K, giving it the characteristic yellow hue of G-type stars.

X-ray emissions from the corona of this star have been detected using the Chandra X-ray Observatory; among the first such detections of X-rays for a G-type supergiant. A secondary X-ray source discovered near Beta Aquarii probably has an extragalactic origin. This star belongs to a group of three intermediate mass stars with a space velocity that is carrying them perpendicular to the plane of the galaxy. The other members of this grouping are Alpha Aquarii and Eta Pegasi.

=== Optical companions ===
β Aquarii companions
| Component | Magnitude | RA | Dec |
| B | 11.0 | 21^{h} 31^{m} 31.9^{s} | −05° 33′ 46″ |
| C | 11.6 | 21^{h} 31^{m} 33.0^{s} | −05° 35′ 10″ |

β Aquarii appears as a solitary star to the naked eye, but when viewed with a telescope is seen to have two faint optical companions. The first has an apparent magnitude of 11.0. In 1947, the position angle was observed at 321 degrees with a separation from Beta Aquarii of 35.4 arcseconds. The second star has a magnitude of 11.6. Its position angle is 186 degrees with a separation from Beta Aquarii of 57.2 arcseconds. The brighter star is designated component A of this grouping, while the companions are components B and C, respectively. As of 2008, there is no definitive evidence that the three stars form a ternary star system, and Gaia Data Release 2 shows the two companions to be around twice the distance of β Aquarii. All three stars have very different proper motions.

== In mythology ==
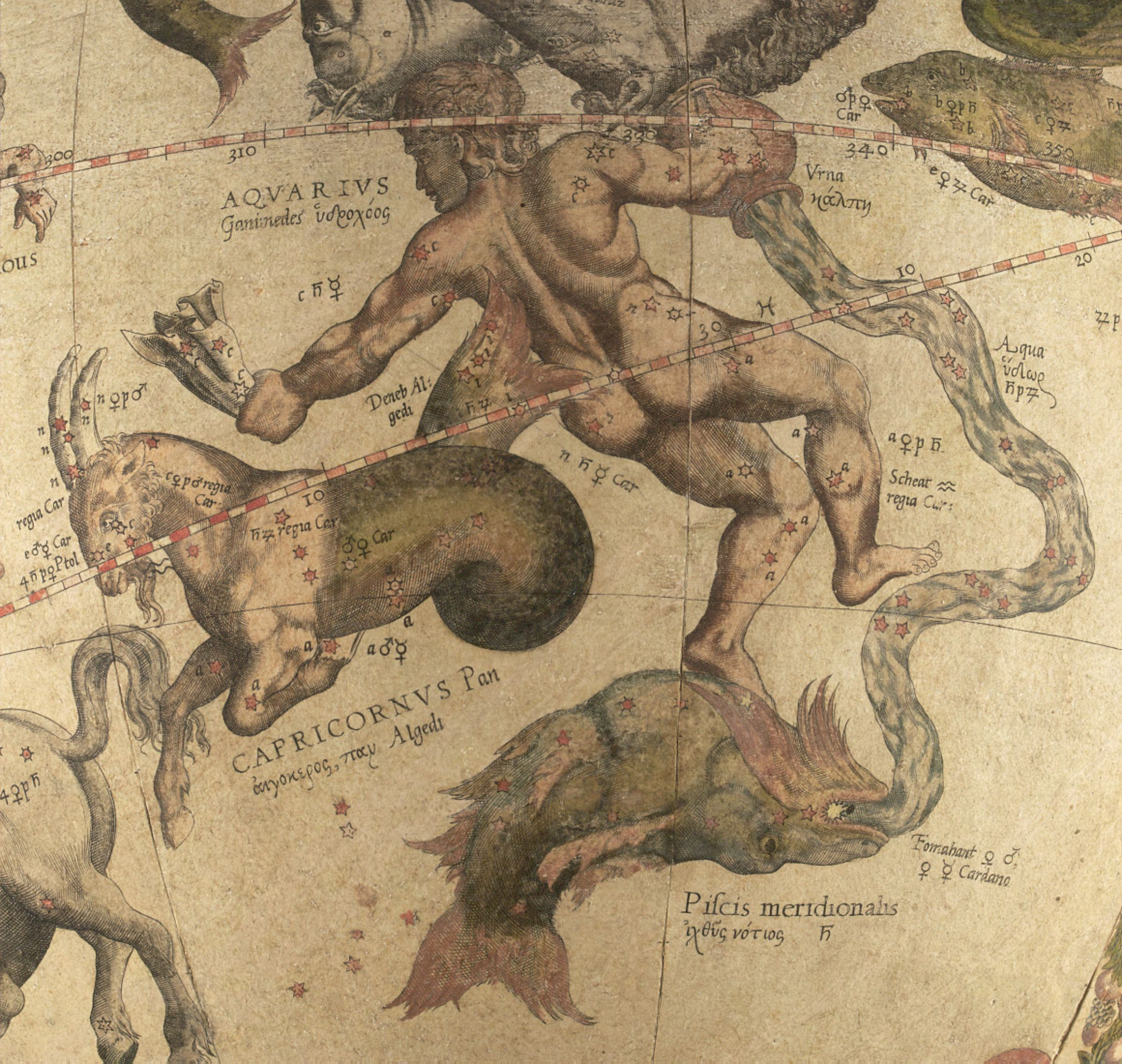
A Gerardus Mercator chart showing Aquarius overlooking Capricorn and pouring water into the mouth of the southern fish (Pisces). β Aquarii is the star in the left shoulder, just above δ Capricorni

In the context of older worldviews (i.e. Egyptian, Persian and Islamic mythology), Sadalsuud relates to the rising of the Sun when winter has passed (March) and the season of gentle, continuous rain has begun. Hence the myth of "luck" or "good fortune" was seen as closely aligned with the essence of spring itself, the burgeoning of new life, and by extension agriculture, which in all societies is the very foundation of prosperity or "good fortune". This mythological view of "the luck of the lucks" also belongs to the 22d Manzil (Arabic Lunar Mansion), which included the two stars Xi Aquarii (Bunda) and 46 Capricorni. (Note: β Aqr as Nir Saad al Saaoud or Lucida Fortunæ Fortunarum (the brightest of luck of lucks) and Xi Aquarii as Thanih Saad al Saaoud or Secunda Fortunæ Fortunarum (the second of luck of lucks). 46 Capricorni should be Thalath Fortunæ Fortunarum or Tertia Fortunæ Fortunarum (the third of luck of lucks) consistently, but Al Achsasi Al Mouakket was not designated the title for this star with uncleared consideration. Possibly according to the differences of opinion with R.H.Allen.)

β and ξ Aquarii also constitute the Persian lunar mansion Bunda and the similar Coptic mansion Upuineuti, the meaning of which is "the Foundation".

In Chinese mythology, β Aqr alone marks the xiu (Chinese lunar mansion) Heu, Hiu, or Hü, "the Void/Emptiness", anciently Ko, the central one of seven xiu which, taken together, were known as Heung Wu, the Black Warrior, in the northern quarter of the sky. As such, Sadalsuud is an expression of the feminine archetype, the Yin or "Void" (Cosmic Mother), from which, many cultures have believed, creation itself (birth) emanates.
