= Katalin Korinthus =

Hungarian politician (1953–2020)

- Born: Katalin Korinthus; 11 May 1953; Miskolc, Hungary
- Died: 25 October 2020 (aged 67)
- Occupation(s): teacher, politician

Katalin Korinthus (11 May 1953 – 25 October 2020) was a Hungarian teacher and politician who served as an MP.

== Career ==
Korinthus graduated from Sárospatak Teacher Training College in 1975 as a lower school teacher and from Lajos Kossuth University in 1980 as a R&D pedagogue. From 1975 until 1980 she taught in No. 3 Primary School and from 1982 until 1992 in Ottó Herman Primary School in Miskolc respectively.

From 1975 until 1992 Korinthus was a member of labor unions of pedagogy. She was a member of MSZP from 1989. From 1990 until 1994 she was a councillor in Miskolc City Council. She ran for a seat in the National Assembly in 1990, 1994 and 1998. She had a seat in the National Assembly from constituency no. 3 of Borsod-Abaúj-Zemplén County during the Horn administration (1994-1998). She was a Member of the Committee for Culture and Press Affairs.

Korinthus was an active volunteer and member in numerous associations and foundations, including Roma-Hungarian Friendship Society.

== Private life ==
Korinthus had been married twice. She married Attila Mihályi in 1973, who died in 1976. Their daughter, Helga, a sociologist, was born in 1975. Her first husband died in 1976. She married assistant professor Péter Tóth in 1977, they had a daughter, Petra. This marriage ended in divorce in 1981.

She died from COVID-19 on 25 October 2020, in Hungary.
