= Reformed Church, Sárospatak =

Reformed Church of Sárospatak

- Location within Hungary
- Country: Hungary
- Denomination: Reformed Christianity
- Website: patakirefegyhaz.hu

Architecture
- Functional status: Active
- Style: Baroque
- Years built: 1776–1786

Administration
- District: Cistibiscan Church District
- Parish: Reformed Congregation of Sárospatak

The Reformed Church of Sárospatak (Hungarian: Sárospataki református templom) is a 18th century Protestant church in Sárospatak, Hungary.

== History ==
After the Reformation, the Reformed congregation began using the St. Elizabeth's Basilica. On August 5, 1671, Zsófia Báthory took the church away from the Calvinists and gave it to the Catholics.

In 1710, the congregation built a wooden church on the site of the present-day church and in 1714, a bell tower was built next to it. In 1726, a larger wooden church was built, but by 1766 it had become dangerous to use due to its poor condition. By this time, the congregation was in need of a new, permanent church. Emperor Joseph II’s visit to Sárospatak in May 1770 came at just the right time. The parish leader personally presented his request for the construction of a stone church to the emperor, and his request was granted six years later, on March 27 1776. The church was completed in 1781. Between 1824 and 1828, the tower was raised by extending the walls and was given a tower clock.

An earthquake in 1834 caused extensive damage to the three-nave church, cracking the vaulted ceiling of the central nave. The damage was not repaired until 1896. The side aisle was built at the same time in front of the main western entrance, giving the church its present form.

== Organ ==
The church's greatest treasure is the organ dating from 1871, which was built by Ludwig Mooser, one of the greatest organ builders of his time, to mark the 100th anniversary of the church's founding. Mooser's greatness is reflected in the fact that his workshop produced, among others, the organs for the basilicas in Esztergom and Eger.

== Gallery ==
Interior

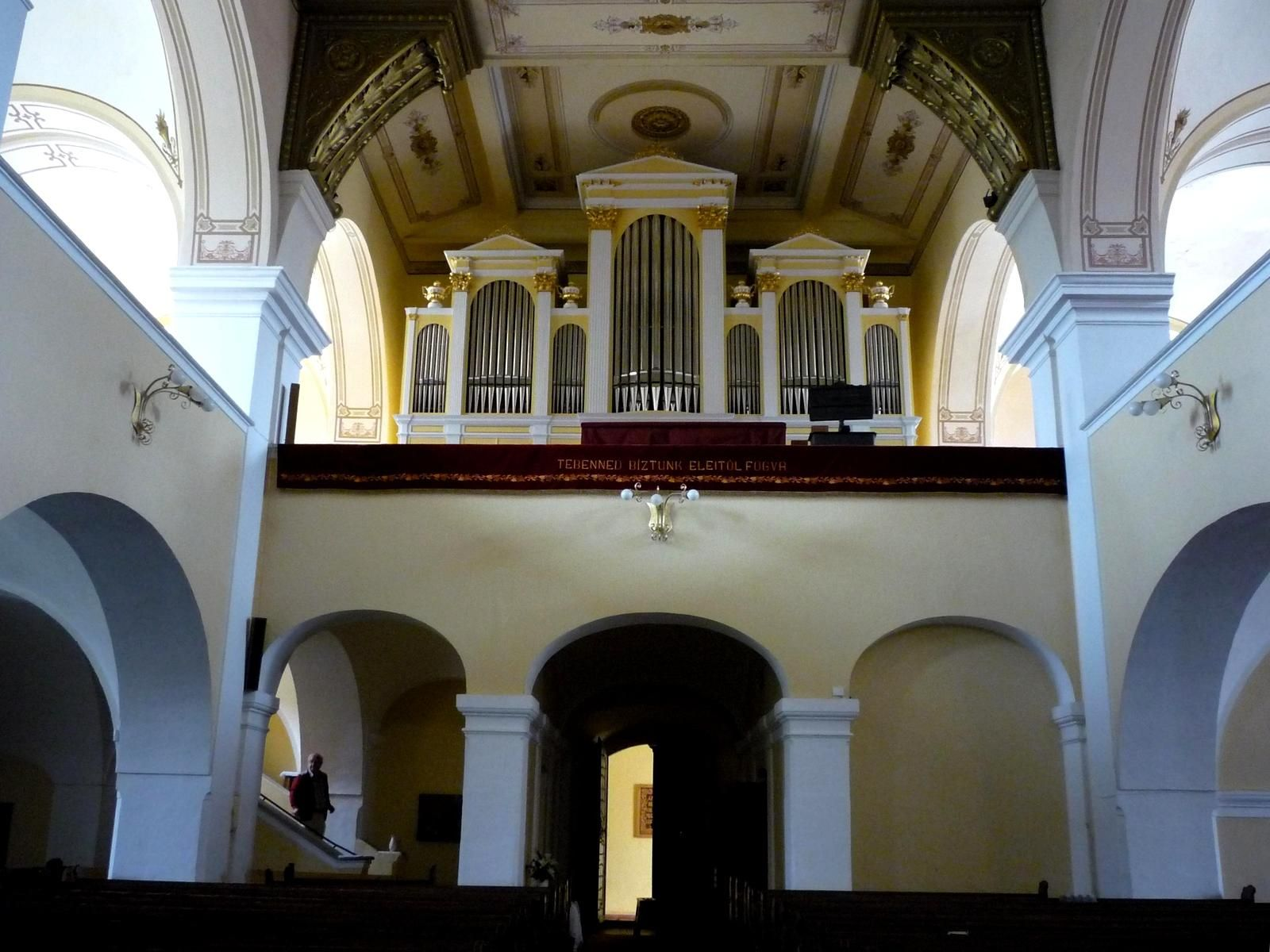
Organ

Tower

Balcony and clock

The church in 1972

== See also ==
- St. Elizabeth's Basilica
- Reformed Church in Hungary
