= Rho Aquarii =

Star in the constellation Aquarius

- Location of ρ Aquarii (circled)

Observation data Epoch J2000 Equinox ICRS
- Constellation: Aquarius
- Right ascension: 22^{h} 20^{m} 11.917^{s}
- Declination: −07° 49′ 15.97″
- Apparent magnitude (V): +5.34

Characteristics
- Spectral type: B8 IIIp Mn:Hg:
- U−B color index: −0.358
- B−V color index: −0.057

Astrometry
Radial velocity (R_{v})	−9 km/s
Proper motion (μ)	RA: +14.803 mas/yr Dec.: +0.472 mas/yr
Parallax (π)	4.3443±0.1468 mas
Distance	750 ± 30 ly (230 ± 8 pc)
Absolute magnitude (M_{V})	−1.78

Orbit
Period (P)	220.41±0.10 d
Eccentricity (e)	0 (assumed)
Periastron epoch (T)	2418548.7±7.4 JD
Semi-amplitude (K_{1}) (primary)	18.66±2.75 km/s

Details

A
Mass	4.63±0.25 M_{☉}
Radius	5.5 R_{☉}
Luminosity	1,023^{+357}_{−264} L_{☉}
Surface gravity (log g)	3.5 cgs
Temperature	12,454±152 K
Metallicity [Fe/H]	0.059 dex
Rotation	6.5633±0.0063 d
Rotational velocity (v sin i)	65.0±6.9 km/s

Other designations
- ρ Aqr, 46 Aquarii, BD−08 5855, GC 31225, HD 211838, HIP 110273, HR 8512, SAO 146023, PPM 206239

Database references
SIMBAD	data

Rho Aquarii is a binary star system in the equatorial constellation of Aquarius. Its name is a Bayer designation that is Latinized from ρ Aquarii, and abbreviated Rho Aqr or ρ Aqr. This system is visible to the naked eye as a point of light with an apparent visual magnitude of +5.34. Based upon parallax measurements, this star is located at a distance of approximately 750 light-years (230 parsecs) from the Sun. It is drifting closer with a radial velocity of –9 km/s. The position of this star near the ecliptic means it is subject to lunar occultations.

This is a single-lined spectroscopic binary, with the presence of a companion being revealed by Doppler shifts in the spectrum. An initial orbital solution for the data gives a period of 220.4 days with a circular orbit.

The primary is a non-magnetic chemically peculiar star with a stellar classification of B8 IIIp Mn:Hg:. It is a candidate mercury-manganese star, showing a surfeit of these elements in the spectrum. At least two pulsation periods have been detected; the first is characteristic of a Delta Scuti variable and the second of a Gamma Doradus variable, suggesting this is a hybrid pulsator. The dominant pulsation period is 1.1203±0.0002 d. With 4.63 times the Sun's mass, this star is radiating 1,023 times as much luminosity from its outer atmosphere at an effective temperature of 12,454 K. This heat gives it the blue-white hue of a B-type star. It is spinning with a rotation period of 6.5633±0.0063 d. The primary does not display photometric variability, but the companion may be a variable star. Although no specific age estimates have been published for this star, it is likely to be less than 50 million years old.
