= Albulaan =

The traditional star name Albulaan refers to two stars in the constellation Aquarius:

- μ Aquarii
- ν Aquarii

The name derives from the Arabic term, al-bulaʽān (ألبولعان) meaning "the two swallowers".
