= St. Elizabeth's Basilica =

Catholic basilica in Sárospatak, Hungary

- Szent Erzsébet-bazilika (Hungarian)
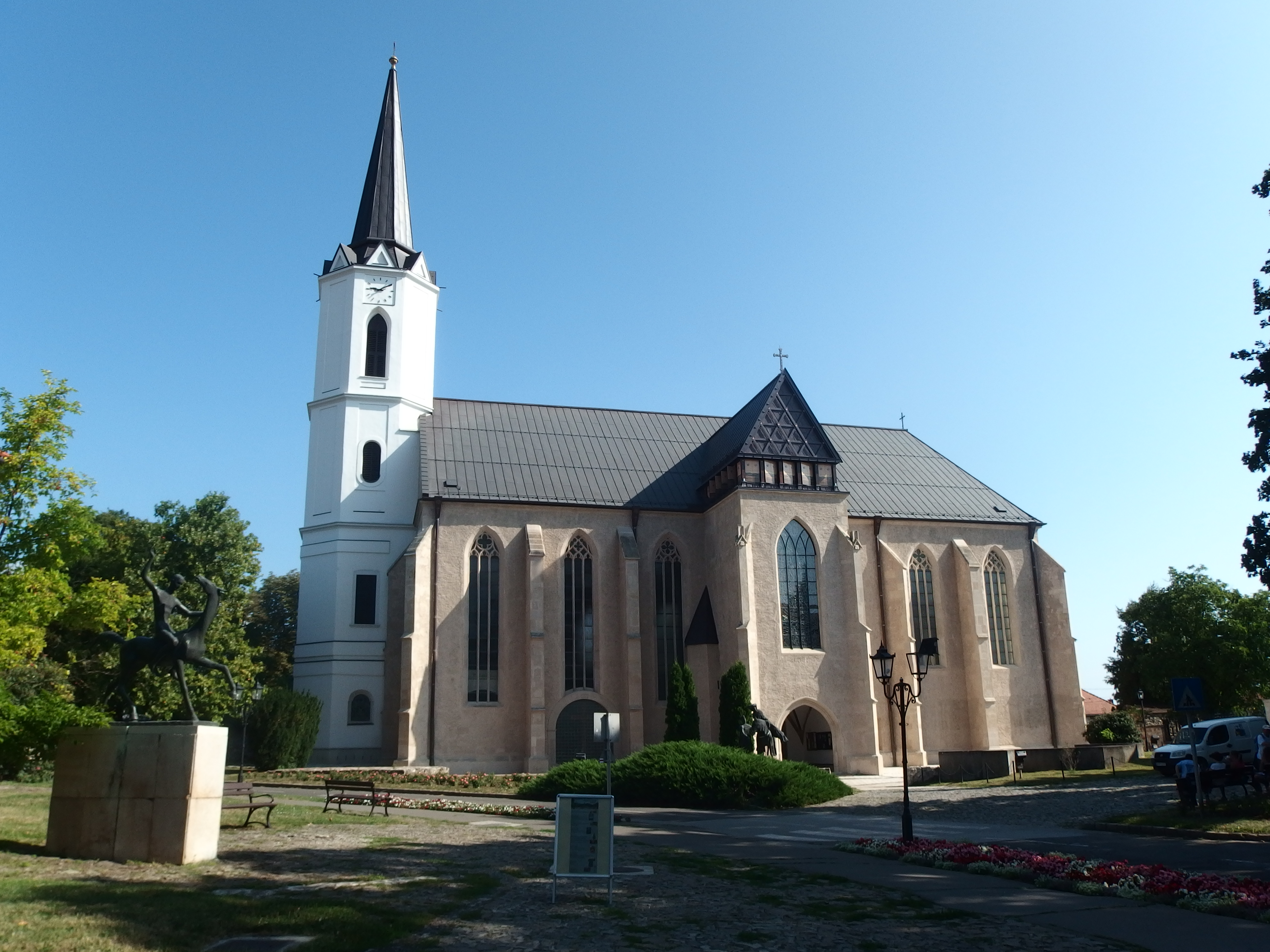
- The south façade

- Location within Hungary
- 48.3184141454924°N 21.56871514033375°E
- Location: Sárospatak
- Country: Hungary
- Denomination: Catholic Church
- Sui iuris church: Latin Church

History
- Status: Basilica, Parish church

Architecture
- Functional status: Active
- Style: Gothic
- Years built: 1492

Administration
- Archdiocese: Archdiocese of Eger

St. Elizabeth's Basilica (Hungarian: Szent Erzsébet-bazilika) is a Roman Catholic basilica in Sárospatak, Hungary. It is named in honour of Elizabeth, the princess of the Kingdom of Hungary and the landgravine of Thuringia. The relics of Elizabeth are kept here, and the St. Elizabeth Trail (Szent Erzsébet Út) pilgrimage route to Košice begins here. It is a significant historical landmark within the Tokaj wine region UNESCO World Heritage site.

== History ==
According to tradition, Saint Elizabeth of Hungary was born in Sárospatak in 1207 and was baptized in a small round church next to the royal manor house.

The current gothic hall church was completed in 1492. During the Turkish occupation the town's castle was fortified with a defensive wall, the northern wall of the church also became part of this wall.

In 1737 a massive fire destroyed the city. The gothic vault, which was three meters higher than the current one, collapsed, and the gothic interior was also destroyed by the fire. It was unused for 50 years. Parts of the church, such as the roof, were rebuilt in Baroque style. It received its Baroque high altar from the Carmelite Monastery of Buda also this time.

On November 18, 2007, the Papal Nuncio to the Vatican, Juliusz Janus elevated the church to the rank of Basilica Minor.

== Gallery ==
Side tower

Eastern side of the church

Fortified walls

Foundations of the round church

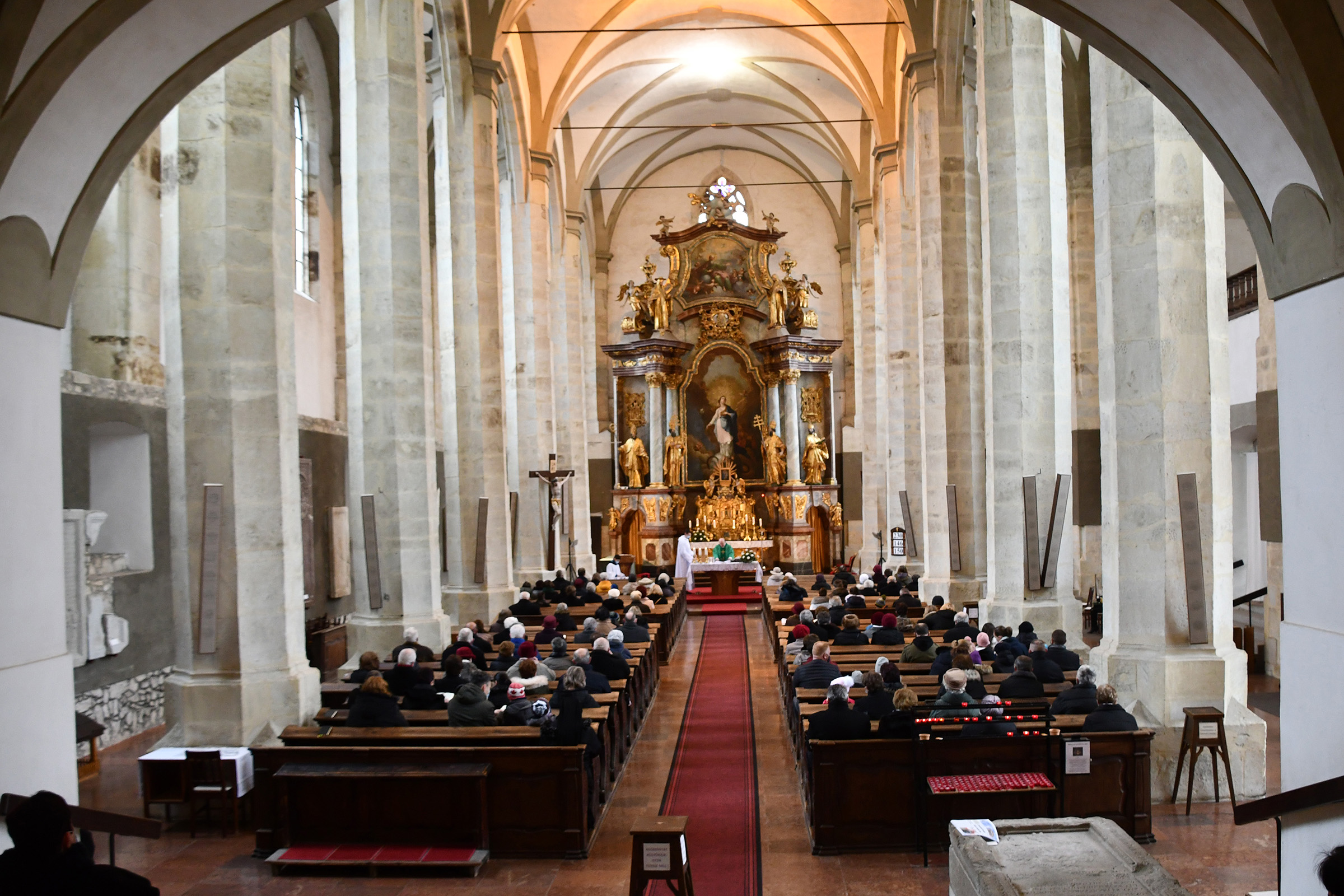
Sanctuary and altar

Main altar

== See also ==
- Roman Catholicism in Hungary
- Elizabeth of Hungary
- Sárospatak
