= Ed Joyce (journalist) =

American television executive (1932–2014)

Edward Matthew Joyce
- Born: December 13, 1932; Phoenix, Arizona
- Died: August 2, 2014 (aged 81); Redding, Connecticut
- Occupation: President of CBS News

Edward Matthew Joyce (December 13, 1932 – August 2, 2014) was a former television executive. He was president of CBS News. He lived for many years in California's Santa Ynez Valley and in Redding, Connecticut.

== Biography ==
=== Early life ===
Born in Phoenix, Arizona during the Depression, Ed Joyce’s father was a member of the Civilian Conservation Corps (an unemployment combatant during the FDR administration), making travel commonplace (think cardboard boxes, second hand at that, a precious commodity during the Depression) for the Joyce family. They moved throughout the Southwest where Ed’s father would trade advertisement in his magazine (as a side job [actually his only job]), The Last Frontier, for tangible goods. This was Ed’s first exposure to the world of media. He would later attend the University of Wyoming and work at small radio station as a janitor/DJ. From his media debut in small-time radio, he moved to television in Utica and Schenectady, New York.

=== CBS Radio and CBS News ===
He then hooked up with CBS Radio, first in Chicago and later in New York, where he was given a daily discussion program called “The Talk of New York” and the opportunity to interview such individuals as civil rights activist Malcolm X and sports legend Jackie Robinson. His success with the radio station and program was only the initial step in his corporate climb. First, he earned a position as an executive producer for the CBS News radio network, then a news director for a television station in New York, third, a Vice President of the news for all five stations in New York, then the general manager for stations in Chicago, including WBBM-TV, where he was well known for his decisive management style, so much so that some disgruntled employees referred to him as the "velvet shiv". Later he was dispatched to Los Angeles, and New York, culminating his career as the President of CBS News.

One of his more prominent accolades was his investigation and publication on the Kennedy-Chappaquiddick fiasco wherein he bypassed the conventional reporting of events and delivered the story for what it was: sensational and dubious. He took note of the fact that Senator Kennedy was in fact a senator, and that he had walked for over a mile from the accident, past two lighted houses, waded a shallow stream, taken a bus, stopped for a lobster roll, bought an ice cream cone, gone beach combing and then waited 12 hours before reporting anything. Ed’s initiative and burning desire for truth earned him the prestigious Sigma Delta Chi journalistic award which he graciously shared with his colleagues who had given him invaluable assistance.

=== Memoir ===
In 1988, Doubleday published Prime Times Bad Times, Joyce's memoir of his time as president of CBS News. Then-Chicago Sun-Times TV and radio critic Robert Feder reviewed the book in May 1988, calling it an "unbelievably detailed, if utterly self-serving, record of chaos at CBS from the moment Dan Rather succeeded Walter Cronkite as nightly news anchorman in 1981 until Joyce's downfall." Feder also wrote that Joyce was "widely regarded throughout his career as aloof, arrogant and insensitive to others," and that the book did "little to dispel that reputation despite the familiar alibi that he was only following orders." Feder concluded by writing that Joyce "wastes our time settling old scores and vainly trying to rehabilitate his image."

== Personal life ==
Journalism is a family tradition. His only son, Randall Joyce is A Producer for CBS NEWS 60 Minutes. Also an award winner, he won an Emmy for his investigative report on the proliferation of dangerous reptiles in suburban, southwest Florida.

Joyce and his wife, Maureen Jarry Joyce, moved from California's Santa Ynez Valley to Redding, Connecticut in 2007.

Joyce died of throat cancer at his Redding, Connecticut home on August 2, 2014, at the age of 81.
