= 46 Capricorni =

Star in the constellation Capricornus

Observation data Epoch J2000 Equinox ICRS
- Constellation: Capricornus
- Right ascension: 21^{h} 45^{m} 00.25467^{s}
- Declination: −09° 04′ 56.7396″
- Apparent magnitude (V): 5.10

Characteristics
- Evolutionary stage: red giant branch
- Spectral type: G8Iab or G7.5II-IIICN0.5
- B−V color index: 1.108±0.001

Astrometry
Radial velocity (R_{v})	−15.52±0.15 km/s
Proper motion (μ)	RA: +13.438 mas/yr Dec.: −1.900 mas/yr
Parallax (π)	4.1906±0.0858 mas
Distance	780 ± 20 ly (239 ± 5 pc)
Absolute magnitude (M_{V})	−1.81

Details
Mass	4.64±0.53 M_{☉}
Radius	32.6±2.3 R_{☉}
Luminosity (bolometric)	627 L_{☉}
Surface gravity (log g)	2.00 cgs
Temperature	4,837±18 K
Metallicity [Fe/H]	+0.01 dex

Other designations
- c^{1} Cap, 46 Cap, BD−09°5829, GC 30448, HD 206834, HIP 107382, HR 8311, SAO 145637, PPM 205561, GSC 05788-01167

Database references
SIMBAD	data

46 Capricorni is a solitary star located around 780 light years away from the Sun in the southern constellation of Capricornus, near the northern border with Aquarius. It is visible to the naked eye as a dim, yellow-hued point of light with an apparent visual magnitude of +5.10. 46 Cap is also known by its Bayer designation of c Capricorni (c Cap), and occasionally as c^{1} Capricorni to distinguish it from the nearby star c^{2} Capricorni. It is moving closer to the Earth with a heliocentric radial velocity of −15.5 km/s.

This star has received a stellar classification of G8Iab, which suggests it is a G-type supergiant star, as well as G7.5II-IIICN0.5, which instead indicates a luminosity class between a giant and a bright giant. Abundance analysis suggests the star has not yet passed the first dredge-up. It has 4.6 times the mass of the Sun and has expanded to 33 times the Sun's radius. The star is radiating 627 times the luminosity of the Sun from its photosphere at an effective temperature of 4,837 K.

== Etymology ==
This star, along with β Aqr (Sadalsuud) and ξ Aqr (Bunda), were Saʽd al Suʽud (سعد السعود), the Luck of Lucks.
