= Ferenc Berényi =

Hungarian painter

Ferenc Berényi (Dévaványa, November 9, 1927 – Budapest, August 2, 2004) was a Hungarian painter.

He studied at the Hungarian Academy of Fine Arts between 1949 and 1953 where his prominent teachers were Jenő Barcsay and Endre Domanovszky. From 1954 he was a regular participant of many exhibitions in Hungary and many other cities, like Moscow, Prague, Warsaw, Sofia, Košice, Kuwait, Bombay, Lausanne, Teheran, Paris, Basel, Washington and Helsinki. In 1961 he was one of the founding members of the Studio of Young Artists. In the same year he got a three-year Derkovits Scholarship and moved to Szolnok where he lived and continued his art until 2004. He was a two-time board member of the painter class of direction of the Hungarian Fine and Applied Arts. From 1975 to 1982 he taught at the University of Art and Design.

== Awards ==
1. 1961–1964: Derkovits Scholarship
2. 1966: Artists Union Country Council Art Award
3. 1968: Munkácsy Award
4. 1975: Szolnok Painter Triennial, 1st Prize,
5. 1978: Szolnok County Council Art Award

== Exhibitions ==
1. 1964 • Szolnok, Szigligeti Theater
2. 1966 • Hungarian National Gallery, Budapest
3. 1967 • Ernst Museum, Budapest
4. 1967 • Szolnok, János Damjanich Museum
5. 1968 • Hódmezővásárhely, János Tornyai Museum
6. 1979 • Horticultural Institute
7. 1981 • Sofia
8. 1983 • Szolnok, Collective Studio
9. 1984 • Szolnok, Cultural Center
10. 2003 • Szolnok, János Damjanich Museum
11. 2007. November 9. - 2008. February Szolnok Gallery, In memoriam Berényi Ferenc

== Works in public ownership ==
1. Budapest, Hungarian National Gallery
2. Szolnok, János Damjanich Museum
3. Hódmezővásárhely, János Tornyai Museum,
4. Sárospatak, Art Gallery
5. Miskolc, Art Gallery
6. Helsinki, Hungarian Embassy
7. Washington, D.C., Hungarian Embassy
8. Athens, Hungarian Embassy
