= 18 Aquarii =

Yellowish star in the constellation Aquarius

Observation data Epoch J2000 Equinox ICRS
- Constellation: Aquarius
- Right ascension: 21^{h} 24^{m} 11.49206^{s}
- Declination: −12° 52′ 41.1928″
- Apparent magnitude (V): 5.49

Characteristics
- Evolutionary stage: main sequence
- Spectral type: F0 V
- B−V color index: +0.29

Astrometry
Radial velocity (R_{v})	−3.0±6.9 km/s
Proper motion (μ)	RA: +89.60 mas/yr Dec.: +8.62 mas/yr
Parallax (π)	21.23±0.29 mas
Distance	154 ± 2 ly (47.1 ± 0.6 pc)
Absolute magnitude (M_{V})	2.12

Details
Mass	1.54 M_{☉}
Luminosity	11.8 L_{☉}
Surface gravity (log g)	3.98 cgs
Temperature	7,194 K
Metallicity [Fe/H]	–0.16 dex
Rotational velocity (v sin i)	138 km/s
Age	480 Myr

Other designations
- 18 Aqr, BD−13°5923, FK5 1562, HD 203705, HIP 105668, HR 8187, SAO 164364

Database references
SIMBAD	data

18 Aquarii is a single, yellow-white hued star in the equatorial constellation of Aquarius. The designation is from the catalogue of English astronomer John Flamsteed, first published in 1712. The star is faintly visible to the naked eye with an apparent visual magnitude of 5.49 and is located about 154 light-years (47 parsecs) from Earth.

This is an F-type main sequence star with a stellar classification of F0 V. It is an estimated 480 million years old and has a high rate of spin with a projected rotational velocity of 138 km/s. The star has 1.54 times the mass of the Sun and is radiating 11.8 times the Sun's luminosity from its photosphere at an effective temperature of 7,194 K.
