= 3 Aquarii =

Star in the constellation Aquarius

- Location of 3 Aquarii (circled)

Observation data Epoch J2000 Equinox ICRS
- Constellation: Aquarius
- Right ascension: 20^{h} 47^{m} 44.23898^{s}
- Declination: −05° 01′ 39.7220″
- Apparent magnitude (V): 4.429

Characteristics
- Evolutionary stage: asymptotic giant branch
- Spectral type: M3 III
- U−B color index: +1.914
- B−V color index: +1.651
- Variable type: Lb

Astrometry
Radial velocity (R_{v})	−22.0 km/s
Proper motion (μ)	RA: +1.68 mas/yr Dec.: −40.06 mas/yr
Parallax (π)	5.57±0.28 mas
Distance	590 ± 30 ly (180 ± 9 pc)
Absolute magnitude (M_{V})	−1.83

Details
Mass	1.8 M_{☉}
Radius	117.59+3.98 −4.21 R_{☉}
Luminosity	1,771±128 L_{☉}
Surface gravity (log g)	0.25 cgs
Temperature	3,452±35 K

Other designations
- EN Aqr, BD−05°5378, FK5 1543, HD 198026, HIP 102624, HR 7951, SAO 144814

Database references
SIMBAD	data

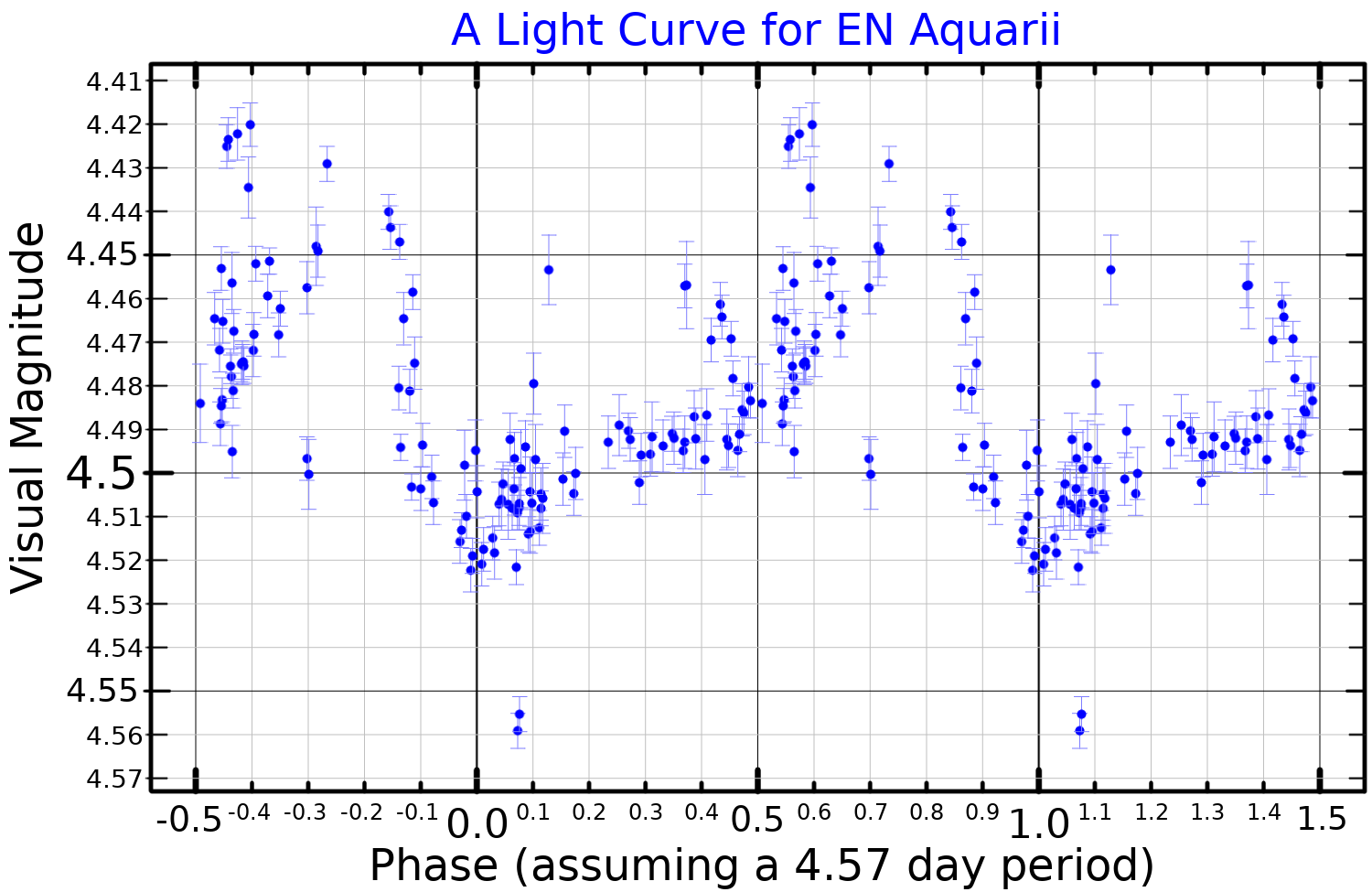
A light curve for EN Aquarii, plotted from Hipparcos data. The data were folded with the 4.57 day period reported by Koen and Eyer (2002)

3 Aquarii (abbreviated 3 Aqr) is a variable star in the equatorial constellation of Aquarius. 3 Aquarii is the Flamsteed designation; it also bears the Bayer designation k Aquarii and the variable star designation EN Aquarii. With a mean apparent visual magnitude of 4.429, it is visible to the naked eye in dark skies. It has an annual parallax shift of 5.57 milliarcseconds with a 5% margin of error, which translates to a physical distance of around 590 light-years (180 parsecs) from Earth.

With a stellar classification of M3 III, this is a red giant star that has exhausted the hydrogen at its core and evolved away from the main sequence of stars like the Sun. The measured angular diameter of this star, after correction for limb darkening, is 5.60±0.70 mas. At the estimated distance of 3 Aquarii, this yields a physical size of about 108 times the radius of the Sun. The effective temperature of the outer atmosphere is 3,450 K, giving this star the cool, reddish hue of an M-type star.

The apparent magnitude of 3 Aquarii varies by up to 0.06 magnitudes, which was first noted in the 1960s. It was formally listed as a variable star in 1973, and given the variable star designation EN Aquarii. It is classified as an irregular variable, although detailed analysis shows multiple possible periods.

Pulsation periods
Period (days)	20.2	24.9	27.2	35.0	36.9	143.9	197.2
Amplitude (magnitudes)	0.020	0.038	0.027	0.021	0.024	0.022	0.027
