= Sárospatak =

- Town
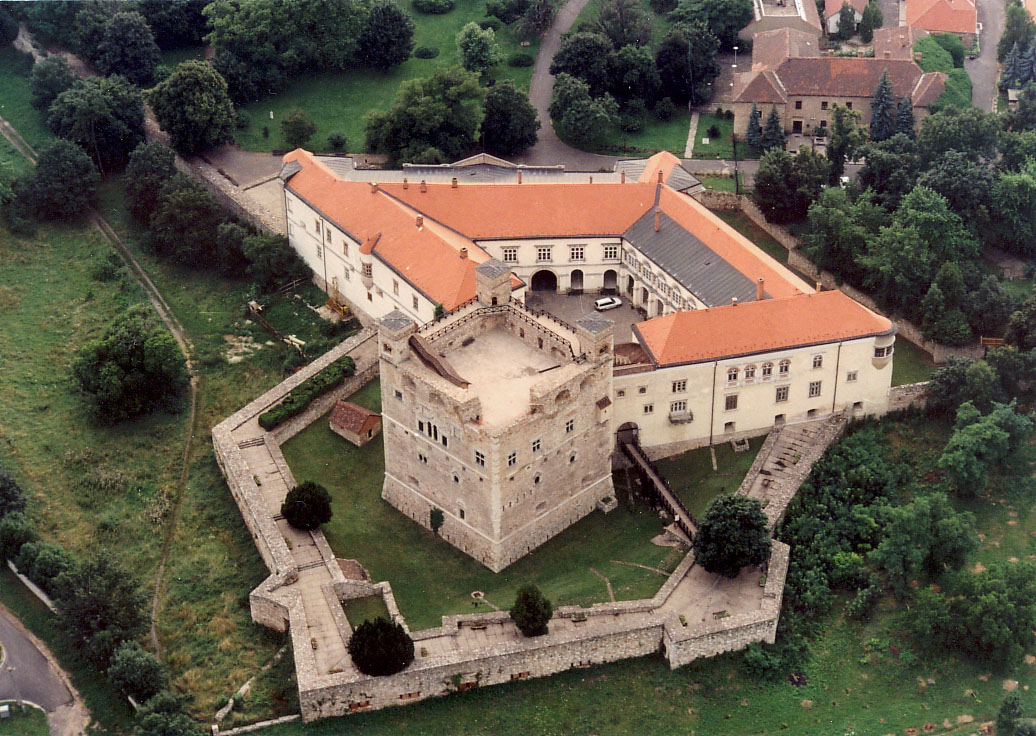
- Sárospatak Castle

- Flag Coat of arms

- Location within Borsod-Abaúj-Zemplén County Location within Hungary
- Coordinates: 48.31897°N 21.56636°E
- Country: Hungary
- Region: Northern Hungary
- County: Borsod-Abaúj-Zemplén
- District: Sárospatak

Area
  - Total: 100.5 km^{2} (38.8 sq mi)

Population (2017)
  - Total: 11,886
  - Density: 118.3/km^{2} (306.3/sq mi)
- Time zone: UTC+1 (CET)
  - Summer (DST): UTC+2 (CEST)
- Postal code: 3950
- Area code: (+36) 47
- Website: sarospatak.hu

Sárospatak (German: Potock, Blattenbach, Slovak: Blatný Potok, lit. 'Muddy Stream or Muddy Creek') is a town in Borsod-Abaúj-Zemplén County, northern Hungary. It lies 70 kilometres (43 miles) northeast from Miskolc, in the Bodrog river valley. The town, often called simply Patak, is a cultural centre, a historical town and a popular tourist destination.

== History ==
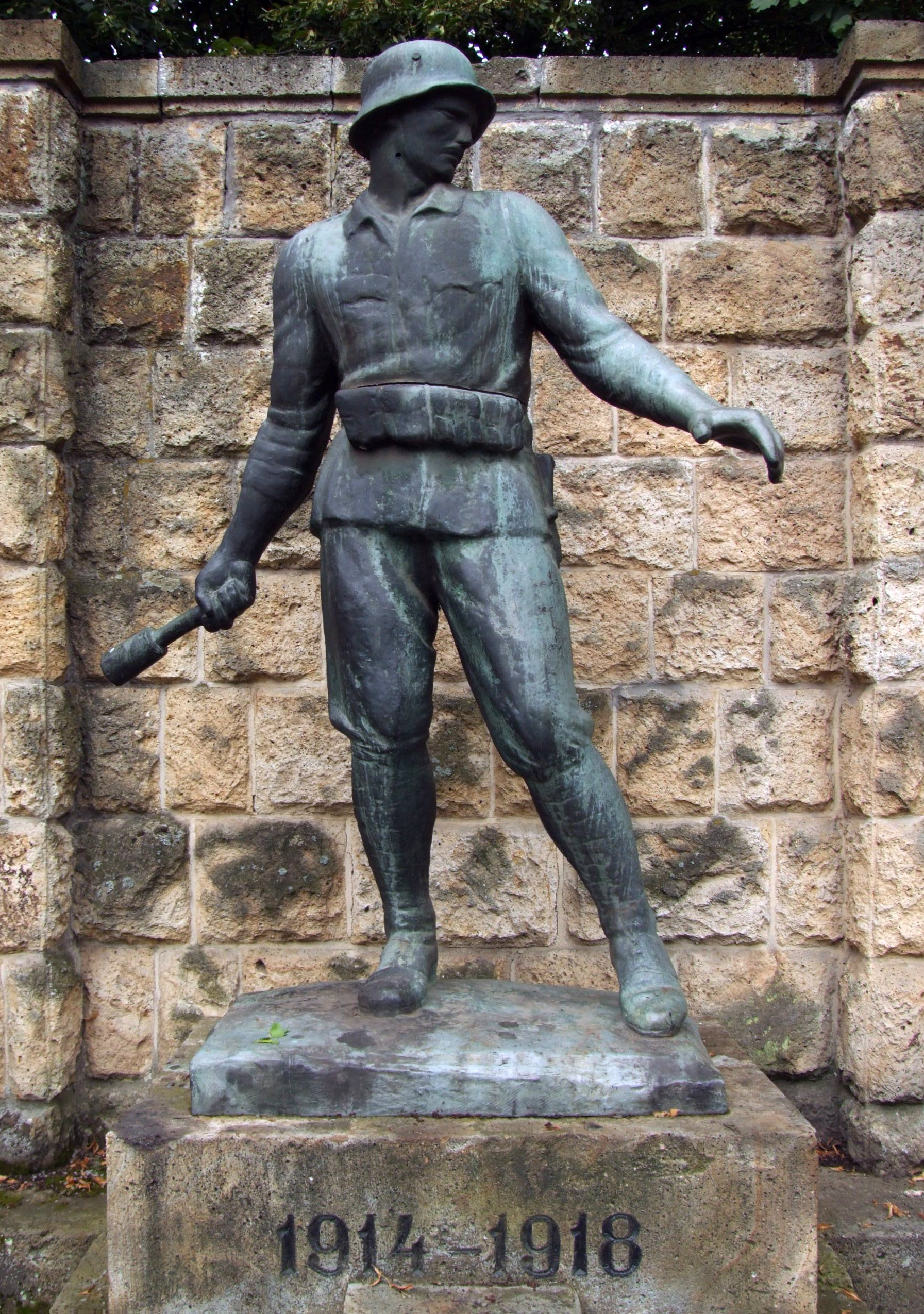
World War I memorial

The area has been inhabited since ancient times. Sárospatak was granted town status in 1201 by King Emeric. In the Middle Ages it was an important place due to its proximity to an important trade route leading to Poland.

=== Castle of Sárospatak ===
==== 13th century ====
Its castle, built by Andrew II, is traditionally identified as the birthplace of his daughter Saint Elizabeth.

==== 15th and 16th centuries ====
Sárospatak was elevated to the rank of free royal town by King Sigismund. In 1460, during the reign of King Matthias it received the right to hold a market. In the 15th and 16th centuries, it was owned by the Pálóczi (Pálóczy) family, until baron Antal Pálóczi was killed at the first Battle of Mohács in 1526, which precipitated a conflict between the family of his widow, born of the Perényi family, and the Pálóczi-related Dobó family. The Perényi family gained control of the castle, and it was in their possession until 1602, when it passed to the Dobó family.

==== 17th and 18th centuries ====
Bálint Balassi, the most important Hungarian poet of the century, married Krisztina Dobó at the castle; the bride was the daughter of István Dobó, who defended the castle of Eger against the Ottoman Turks. Later the castle was owned by the Rákóczi family. The residents of the town took an active part in the revolution and war of independence against Habsburg rule led by Francis II Rákóczi between 1703 and 1711.

The participants of the Wesselényi conspiracy held their secret meetings in a small room in the castle decorated by frescoes of roses.

=== College of Sárospatak ===
The Reformation began spreading into Hungary from this area. The first Protestant college, one of the most important colleges of Hungary at the time, was founded in Sárospatak in 1531. In 1650 Zsuzsanna Lorántffy, widow of George I Rákóczi prince of Transylvania invited the famous Czech educator John Amos Comenius to Sárospatak. Comenius lived there until 1654, as a professor of the college, and he wrote some of his most important works there. Following organizational changes, the educational institution has operated under the name Tokaj-Hegyalja University since 2021, offering courses in viticulture and enology, teaching, tourism and catering, economics, and IT.

=== Hutterite community ===
In 1631 Hutterites from Alvinc (today Vințu de Jos, Romania) came to Sárospatak for construction work. In 1645 George I Rákóczi gave land to Hutterite families in the Héce area of Sárospatak. They came mostly from Csejte (today Čachtice, Slovakia). According to Conrad Jacob Hildebrandt in 1656 there was a significant population of Hutterites numbering 200 people. They were predominantly craftsmen, but some also worked in the agricultural industry. The appearance of the Jesuits in the city in 1663 meant the end of the life of the community. The Jesuit, Johannes Grueber forced them to recatholisation.

=== The Jewish community ===
Jews began to settle in the area in the first half of the 18th century. the Jewish community organized in the late 18th century. They had a rabbi and a jewish school, a yeshiva, and a "Talmud Torah".

In 1930, 1,096 Jews lived there and in 1944 there were 910 Jews.

In 1939, four Jewish families who did not have Hungarian citizenship were deported across the border. After the outbreak of World War II, wealthy Jews and members of the community administration were arrested and imprisoned in a concentration camp. In 1940, Jews were forbidden to sell wine and tobacco and to own radios.

From 1941, Sárospatak served as a center for forced labour within the Hungarian army. The recruited young Jews were mostly sent to Ukraine and some were employed in the construction of a nearby airport.

On April 15, 1944, a few weeks after the German army entered Hungary, a temporary ghetto was established in the city's Jewish school building where the wealthy among the local Jews were tortured to extort confessions about burying property. A few days later, they were transferred by train to the Sátoraljaújhely ghetto and from there sent to the Auschwitz extermination camp.

== Climate ==
Climate data for Sárospatak
Month	Jan	Feb	Mar	Apr	May	Jun	Jul	Aug	Sep	Oct	Nov	Dec	Year
Daily mean °F	26.1	29.8	39.7	50.4	60.4	65.3	69.6	68.0	60.6	50.4	39.0	31.1	49.3
Daily mean °C	−3.3	−1.2	4.3	10.2	15.8	18.5	20.9	20.0	15.9	10.2	3.9	−0.5	9.6

== Sights ==
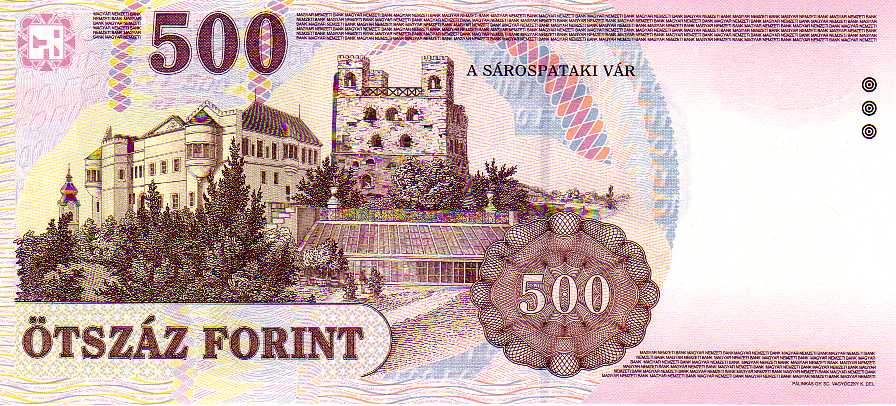
The castle of Sárospatak on the reverse side of 500 Hungarian Forint banknote

- Castle of Sárospatak (with Renaissance tower)
- Art Gallery of Sárospatak
- St. Elizabeth's Basilica
- Reformed Church

== Notable people ==
=== 13th to 16th C. ===
- Elizabeth of Hungary (1207 – 1231), a princess of the Kingdom of Hungary.
- Ladislaus IV of Hungary (1262 – 1290), king of Hungary and Croatia from 1272 to 1290.
- Bálint Balassi (1554 – 1594), a Hungarian Renaissance lyric poet.
- János Petki (1572 in Sárospatak – 1612 in Brassó), a Hungarian noble and poet, Chancellor of Transylvania, 1607-1608.
- John Amos Comenius (1592 – 1670) a Czech philosopher, pedagogue and theologian.

=== 17th C. ===
- Zsuzsanna Lorántffy (1602 in Ónod, Hungary – 1660 in Sárospatak) a Princess consort of Transylvania
- George II Rákóczi (1621 – 1660) a Hungarian nobleman and Prince of Transylvania (1648-1660).
- Johann Grueber (1623, Linz – 1680, Sárospatak) an Austrian Jesuit missionary and astronomer in China
- Ilona Zrínyi (1643, Ozalj – 1703, Izmit) a noblewoman and heroine.
- Francis II Rákóczi (1676 – 1735) a Hungarian nobleman and leader of Rákóczi's War of Independence (1703–11).

=== 18th C. ===
- András Fáy (1786 – 1864) a Hungarian author, lawyer, politician and businessman.
- Ján Chalupka (1791-1871) a Slovak dramatist, playwright, publicist and Evangelical pastor.

=== 19th C. ===
- Lajos Kossuth (1802 – 1894) a Hungarian nobleman, lawyer, journalist, politician and statesman.
- János Erdélyi (1814 in Nagykapos – 1868 in Sárospatak) a Hungarian poet, critic, author, philosopher and ethnographist.
- Frigyes Ákos Hazslinszky (1818 – Eperjes, 1896) a Hungarian mycologist and botanist.
- Mihály Tompa (1819 – 1868), a Hungarian lyric poet, Calvinist minister and scientist.
- Miklós Izsó (1831, Izsófalva, Hungary - 1875, Budapest) a Hungarian sculptor

=== 20th C. ===
- Ferenc Berényi (Dévaványa, 1927 – Budapest, 2004) a Hungarian painter.
- Imre Makovecz (1935 in Budapest – 2011 in Budapest) a Hungarian architect

== Twin towns – sister cities ==
Sárospatak is twinned with:

- Bardejov, Slovakia
- Collegno, Italy
- Eisenach, Germany
- Izvoru Crișului, Romania
- Jindřichův Hradec, Czech Republic
- Krosno, Poland
- Soest, Germany
- Tekirdağ, Turkey
- Ogulin, Croatia
- Næstved, Denmark
- Jasło, Poland
- Trešnjevac, Serbia
- Oberschützen, Austria
