= 5 Aquarii =

Star in the constellation Aquarius

Observation data Epoch J2000 Equinox J2000
- Constellation: Aquarius
- Right ascension: 20^{h} 52^{m} 08.69383^{s}
- Declination: −05° 30′ 25.4095″
- Apparent magnitude (V): 5.55

Characteristics
- Spectral type: B9 III
- B−V color index: −0.076±0.010

Astrometry
Radial velocity (R_{v})	−2.6±0.6 km/s
Proper motion (μ)	RA: +1.271 mas/yr Dec.: −5.828 mas/yr
Parallax (π)	4.1831±0.0861 mas
Distance	780 ± 20 ly (239 ± 5 pc)
Absolute magnitude (M_{V})	−0.94

Details
Luminosity	317.56 L_{☉}
Surface gravity (log g)	3.35 cgs
Temperature	11,200 K
Metallicity [Fe/H]	0.10 dex
Rotational velocity (v sin i)	25 km/s

Other designations
- 5 Aqr, NSV 13360, BD−06°5606, HD 198667, HIP 103005, HR 7985, SAO 144889

Database references
SIMBAD	data

5 Aquarii is a single star in the zodiac constellation of Aquarius, located about 780 light years away from the Sun, based on parallax. 5 Aquarii is the Flamsteed designation. It is visible to the naked eye as a faint, blue-white hued star with an apparent visual magnitude of 5.55. This object is moving closer to the Earth with a heliocentric radial velocity of −3 km/s.

This is a suspected chemically peculiar star star with a stellar classification of B9 III, although Adelman et al. (2004) consider it to be a normal star with near-solar elemental abundances. It is relatively sharp-lined with a projected rotational velocity of 25 km/s. The star is radiating 318 times the luminosity of the Sun from its photosphere at an effective temperature of 11,200 K.
