= 14 Aquarii =

Star in the constellation Aquarius

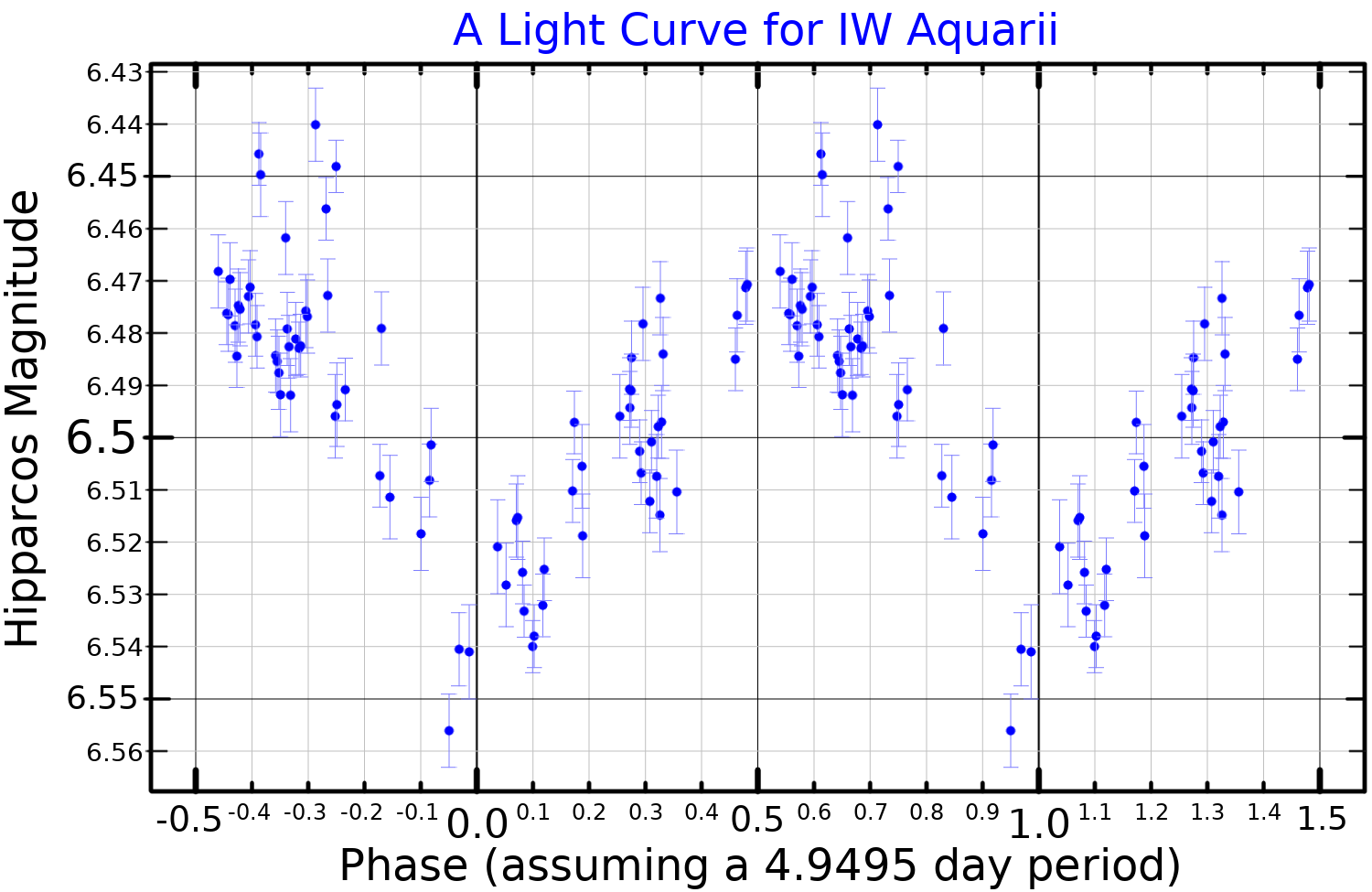
- A light curve for IW Aquarii, plotted from Hipparcos data

Observation data Epoch J2000 Equinox ICRS
- Constellation: Aquarius
- Right ascension: 21^{h} 16^{m} 17.7734^{s}
- Declination: −09° 12′ 52.795″
- Apparent magnitude (V): 6.44 - 6.55

Characteristics
- Evolutionary stage: red giant branch
- Spectral type: M4III:
- B−V color index: 1.57
- Variable type: SRb

Astrometry
Radial velocity (R_{v})	8.00 km/s
Proper motion (μ)	RA: −1.597 mas/yr Dec.: +3.549 mas/yr
Parallax (π)	2.4622±0.0685 mas
Distance	1,320 ± 40 ly (410 ± 10 pc)
Absolute magnitude (M_{V})	−2.3

Details
Mass	1.9 M_{☉}
Radius	106 R_{☉}
Luminosity	2,145 L_{☉}
Surface gravity (log g)	+0.36 cgs
Temperature	3,542 K
Metallicity [Fe/H]	−0.4 dex
Age	1.5 Gyr

Other designations
- IW Aquariii, BD−09°5700, HD 202466, HIP 105019, SAO 145251.

Database references
SIMBAD	data

14 Aquarii (abbreviated 14 Aqr) is red giant star. 14 Aquarii is the Flamsteed designation; it also bears the variable star designation IW Aquarii. It is a semiregular variable with an amplitude of a tenth of a magnitude, and shows variations on a timescale of just one day. At its brightest, magnitude 6.44, it could be faintly visible to the naked eye under ideal observing conditions.

In 1996 the variability of the brightness of 14 Aquarii was first detected, in the Hipparcos satellite data, resulting in the publication of its variable star designation in 1999.
