= 8 Aquarii =

Star in the constellation Aquarius

Observation data Epoch J2000 Equinox J2000
- Constellation: Aquarius
- Right ascension: 20^{h} 59^{m} 54.826^{s}
- Declination: −13° 03′ 05.87″
- Apparent magnitude (V): 6.60

Characteristics
- Spectral type: A3/4 IV
- B−V color index: 0.177±0.007

Astrometry
Proper motion (μ)	RA: −31.787 mas/yr Dec.: −6.566 mas/yr
Parallax (π)	10.9478±0.1472 mas
Distance	298 ± 4 ly (91 ± 1 pc)
Absolute magnitude (M_{V})	1.91

Details
Mass	1.9 M_{☉}
Radius	2.27 R_{☉}
Luminosity	19 L_{☉}
Surface gravity (log g)	4.06 cgs
Temperature	8,008 K
Metallicity [Fe/H]	0.11 dex

Other designations
- BD−13°5813, HD 199828, HIP 103640, SAO 164046

Database references
SIMBAD	data

8 Aquarii (abbreviated 8 Aqr) is a blue-white sub-giant of the spectral class A4IV in the constellation Aquarius. 8 Aquarii is the Flamsteed designation. It is approximately 298 light-years away from Earth, based on parallax. It is approximately 1.7 solar masses and about 3 times hotter than the Sun and thus allows lines of ionized metals with an abundance of metals.
