= 4 Aquarii =

Star in the constellation Aquarius

Observation data Epoch J2000 Equinox ICRS
- Constellation: Aquarius
- Right ascension: 20^{h} 51^{m} 25.74827^{s}
- Declination: −05° 37′ 35.8719″
- Apparent magnitude (V): 5.99 (6.40 + 7.43)

Characteristics
- Spectral type: F7 IV + F6: V:
- B−V color index: 0.464±0.003

Astrometry
Radial velocity (R_{v})	−21.50 km/s
Proper motion (μ)	RA: 95.47 mas/yr Dec.: 1.78 mas/yr
Parallax (π)	16.47±0.59 mas
Distance	198 ± 7 ly (61 ± 2 pc)
Absolute magnitude (M_{V})	2.15

Orbit
Period (P)	200.7±1.1 yr
Semi-major axis (a)	0.816±0.006″
Eccentricity (e)	0.535+0.006 −0.005
Inclination (i)	64.06+0.26 −0.27°
Longitude of the node (Ω)	174.31+0.38 −0.39°
Periastron epoch (T)	B 1,896.8+0.39 −0.40
Argument of periastron (ω) (secondary)	45.9±1.2°

Details

4 Aqr A
Mass	1.618±0.004 M_{☉}
Luminosity	11.0 L_{☉}
Surface gravity (log g)	3.79 cgs
Temperature	6,440 K
Metallicity [Fe/H]	0.18 dex
Rotational velocity (v sin i)	34.6 km/s
Age	1.60 Gyr

4 Aqr B
Mass	1.331±0.003 M_{☉}

Other designations
- 4 Aqr, BD−06°5604, HD 198571, HIP 102945, HR 7982, SAO 144877, WDS J2051.4-0538

Database references
SIMBAD	4 Aqr
- 4 Aqr A
- 4 Aqr B

4 Aquarii (abbreviated 4 Aqr) is a binary star system in the constellation Aquarius, located approximately 198 light years away from the Sun. 4 Aquarii is the Flamsteed designation. It is visible to the naked eye as a dim, yellow-white hued star with a combined apparent visual magnitude of 5.99. The system is moving closer to the Earth with a heliocentric radial velocity of −21.5 km/s.

This is a visual binary with an orbital period of 200.7 years and an eccentricity of 0.535. The magnitude 6.40 primary, designated component A, is an F-type subgiant star with a stellar classification of F7 IV, suggesting that it has exhausted the hydrogen at its core and evolved off the main sequence. It has a dynamically-measured mass 1.6 times that of the Sun and is radiating 11 times the Sun's luminosity from its photosphere at an effective temperature of 6,440 K. The magnitude 7.43 secondary, component B, is a suspected F-type main-sequence star of class F6 V. The pair are an estimated 1.6 billion years old.
