= 17 Aquarii =

Star in the constellation Aquarius

Observation data Epoch J2000 Equinox ICRS
- Constellation: Aquarius
- Right ascension: 21^{h} 22^{m} 56.25866^{s}
- Declination: −09° 19′ 09.5823″
- Apparent magnitude (V): 5.99

Characteristics
- Spectral type: K4/5 III
- B−V color index: 1.516±0.008

Astrometry
Radial velocity (R_{v})	18.2±2.9 km/s
Proper motion (μ)	RA: −29.659 mas/yr Dec.: −29.022 mas/yr
Parallax (π)	4.9125±0.1260 mas
Distance	660 ± 20 ly (204 ± 5 pc)
Absolute magnitude (M_{V})	−0.73

Orbit
Period (P)	7,290 d
Eccentricity (e)	0.4

Details

17 Aqr A
Luminosity	495.46 L_{☉}
Surface gravity (log g)	1.74±0.14 cgs
Temperature	3,951±14 K
Metallicity [Fe/H]	−0.10±0.06 dex

Other designations
- 17 Aqr, BD−09°5728, FK5 3705, HD 203525, HIP 105574, HR 8175, SAO 145351

Database references
SIMBAD	data

17 Aquarii, abbreviated 17 Aqr, is a spectroscopic binary star system in the constellation of Aquarius. 17 Aquarii is the Flamsteed designation. It appears to the naked eye as a faint sixth magnitude star, having a combined apparent visual magnitude of 5.99. The distance to 17 Aqr can be estimated from its annual parallax shift of 4.9 mas, which yields a separation of around 660 light years. It is moving further away with a heliocentric radial velocity of 18 km/s.

A preliminary orbit for the pair gives a period of 20 years and an eccentricity of 0.4. The primary component is an aging giant star with a stellar classification of K4/5 III. It is radiating 495 times the Sun's luminosity from its photosphere at an effective temperature of 3,951 K.
