= 47 Capricorni =

Star in the constellation Capricornus

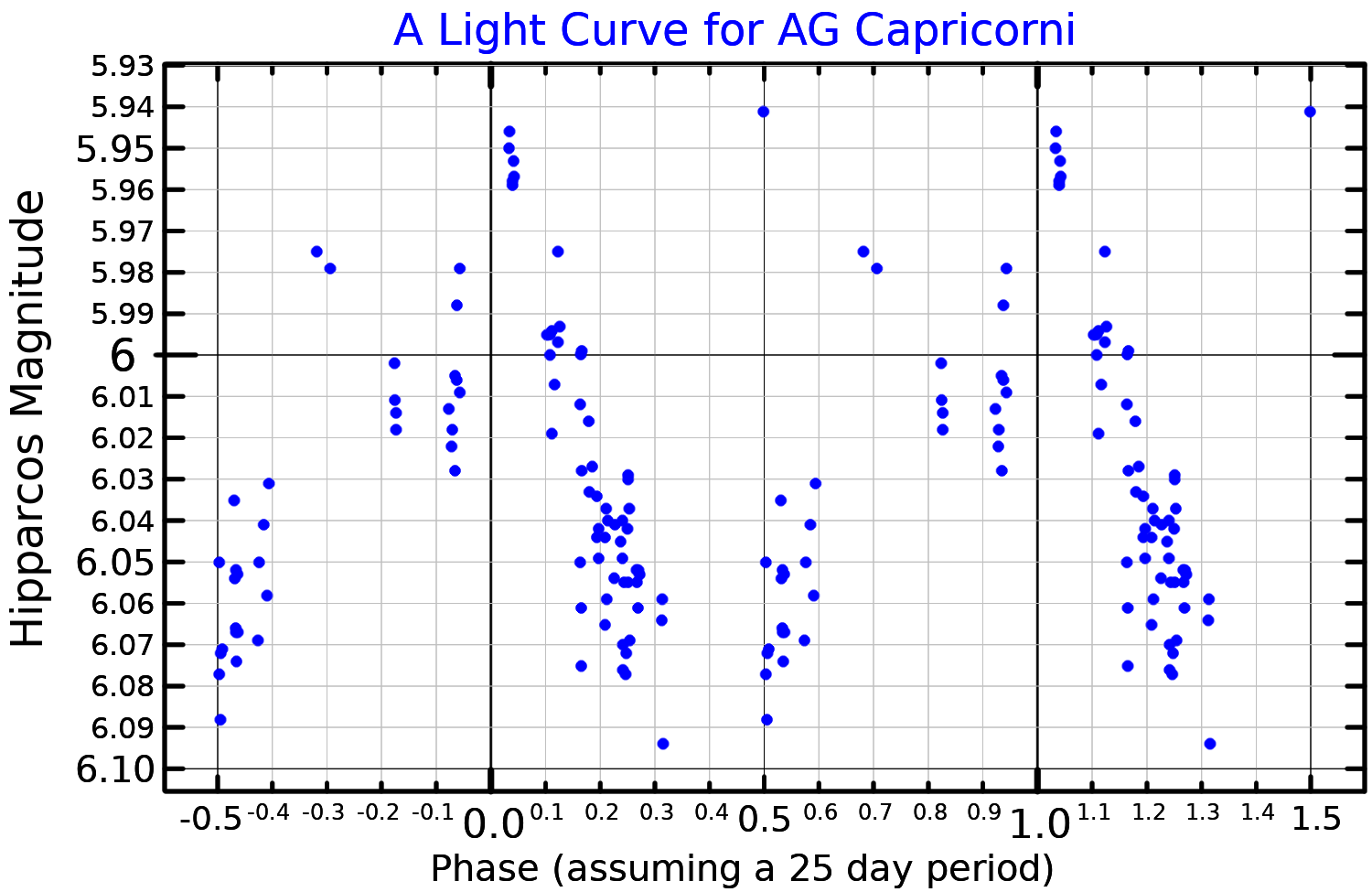
- A light curve for AG Capricorni, plotted from Hipparcos data

Observation data Epoch J2000 Equinox ICRS
- Constellation: Capricornus
- Right ascension: 21^{h} 46^{m} 16.26931^{s}
- Declination: −09° 16′ 33.3668″
- Apparent magnitude (V): 5.90 - 6.14

Characteristics
- Evolutionary stage: AGB
- Spectral type: M2III
- B−V color index: 1.629±0.010
- Variable type: SRb

Astrometry
Radial velocity (R_{v})	+19.80±0.89 km/s
Proper motion (μ)	RA: +18.355 mas/yr Dec.: +7.562 mas/yr
Parallax (π)	3.4703±0.0825 mas
Distance	940 ± 20 ly (288 ± 7 pc)
Absolute magnitude (M_{V})	−1.76

Details
Mass	1.7 M_{☉}
Radius	122 R_{☉}
Luminosity	1,672 L_{☉}
Surface gravity (log g)	1.25 cgs
Temperature	3,646 K
Metallicity [Fe/H]	−0.28 dex
Age	224 Myr

Other designations
- c^{2} Cap, 47 Cap, AG Cap, BD−09°5833, HD 207005, HIP 107487, HR 8318, SAO 145648

Database references
SIMBAD	data

47 Capricorni is a variable star located around 940 light years from the Sun in the southern constellation Capricornus, near the northern border with Aquarius. It has the variable star designation of AG Capricorni and a Bayer designation of c^{2} Capricorni; 47 Capricorni is the Flamsteed designation. This object is visible to the naked eye as a dim, red-hued point of light with an apparent visual magnitude that varies between 5.90 and 6.14. The star is receding from the Earth with a heliocentric radial velocity of +20 km/s.

In 1963, Alan William James Cousins announced that 47 Capricorni is a variable star. It was given its variable star designation in 1973.

This is an aging red giant star with a stellar classification of M2III. It is a semiregular variable star of subtype SRb with a period of 30.592 days and a maximum brightness of 5.9 magnitude. With the supply of hydrogen at its core exhausted, the star has expanded to around 122 times the Sun's radius. It is radiating 1,672 times the luminosity of the Sun from its swollen photosphere at an effective temperature of 3,646 K.
