= Emptiness (Chinese constellation) =

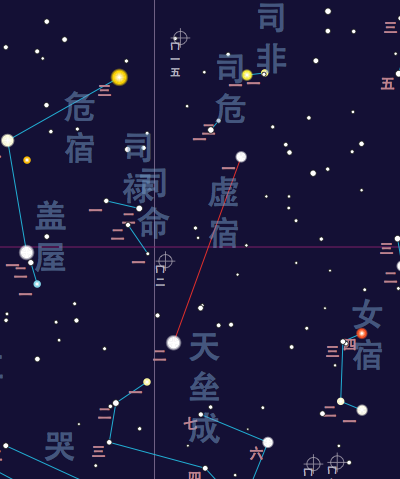
Xū Xiù map

The Emptiness mansion (simplified Chinese: 虚宿; traditional Chinese: 虛宿; pinyin: Xū Xiù) is one of the Twenty-eight mansions of the Chinese constellations. It is one of the northern mansions of the Black Tortoise.

== Asterisms ==
English name	Chinese name	European constellation	Number of stars	Representing
Emptiness	虛	Aquarius/Equuleus	2	Empty ruins or the officials responsible for funeral
Deified Judge of Life	司命	Aquarius	2	Palm to punish the sin, or the ghost of God
Deified Judge of Rank	司祿	Aquarius/Pegasus	2	Palm to give the rank, or the God of life
Deified Judge of Disaster and Good Fortune	司危	Equuleus	2	Palm to forecast disaster and good fortune, or the God of peace
Deified Judge of Right and Wrong	司非	Equuleus	2	Right and wrong or a sin palm of God
Crying	哭	Aquarius/Capricornus	2	Crying
Weeping	泣	Aquarius	2	Low crying
Celestial Ramparts	天壘城	Aquarius/Capricornus	13	Fortifications in heaven
Decayed Mortar	腋臼	Piscis Austrinus/Grus	4	Rotten mortar fracture
Jade Ornament on Ladies' Wear	離瑜	Piscis Austrinus/Microscopium	3	Women's jacket and ball decoration
