= Matariki =

Māori new year festival

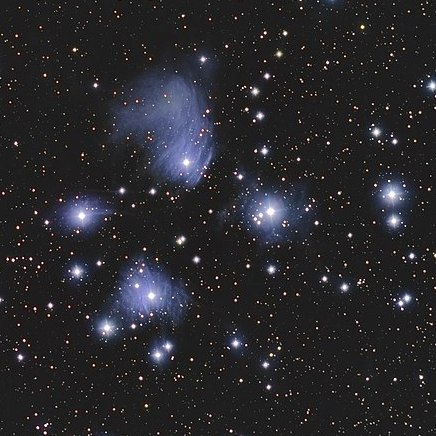
- Observed by: Māori people, New Zealand
- Type: Cultural
- Significance: Heliacal rising of the Pleiades star cluster (Māori: Matariki), signalling the Māori new year.
- Celebrations: Some hold dawn ceremonies and/or lay a hāngī
- Date: June to July (varies)
- 2025 date: 20 June
- 2026 date: 10 July
- 2027 date: 25 June
- 2028 date: 14 July
- Frequency: Annual
- First time: 2022

In Māori culture, Matariki (Māori pronunciation: [ˈmɐtɐɾiki]) is the Pleiades star cluster and a celebration of its first rising in late June or early July. The rising marks the beginning of the new year in the Māori lunar calendar.

Historically, Matariki was usually celebrated for a period of days during the last quarter of the moon of the lunar month Pipiri (around June). The ceremony involved viewing the individual stars for forecasts of the year to come, mourning the deceased of the past year, and making an offering of food to replenish the stars. Some Māori use the rise of Puanga (Rigel) or other stars to mark the new year.

Celebration of Matariki declined during the 20th century, but beginning in the early 1990s it underwent a revival. Matariki was first celebrated as an official public holiday in New Zealand on 24 June 2022.

== Name and meaning ==
Matariki is the Māori name for the cluster of stars also known as the Pleiades in the constellation Taurus. Matariki is a shortened version of Ngā mata o te ariki o Tāwhirimātea, "the eyes of the god Tāwhirimātea". According to Māori tradition, Tāwhirimātea, the god of wind and weather, was enraged by the separation of heaven and earth – his parents, Ranginui and Papatūānuku. Defeated in battle by his brother, Tāwhirimātea fled to the sky to live with Ranginui, but in his anger he first plucked out his eyes as a gesture of contempt towards his siblings, and flung them into the sky, where they remain, stuck to his father's chest. In Māori tradition the unpredictability of the winds is blamed on Tāwhirimātea's blindness.

The word Matariki is the name of both the star cluster and one of the stars within it. Other terms for the cluster as a whole include Te Tautari-nui-o-Matariki ("Matariki fixed in the heavens") and Te Huihui o Matariki ("the assembly of Matariki").

Matariki is sometimes incorrectly translated as mata riki ("little eyes"), a mistake originating in the work of Elsdon Best and continued by others.

=== In other Polynesian cultures ===
The word matariki or similar, referring to the Pleiades, is found in many Polynesian languages. In the Marquesas the star cluster is known as Mataiʻi or Mataʻiki, in the Cooks as Matariki, and in the Tuamotu archipelago as Mata-ariki. In some languages it has Best's meaning of 'little eyes', but in most it is a contraction of mata-ariki, meaning 'eyes of the god' or 'eyes of the chief'. In Hawaiʻi, the rising of Makaliʻi on 20 November ushers in the four-month season Makahiki, which honours Lono, the god of agriculture and fertility. In Tahiti, the year was divided into two seasons, named according to whether the Pleiades are visible after sunset: Matariʻi i nia ('Matariʻi above') and Matariʻi i raro ('Matariʻi below'). On Rapa Nui, Matariki heralded the New Year, and its disappearance in mid-April ended the fishing season.

== The nine stars ==
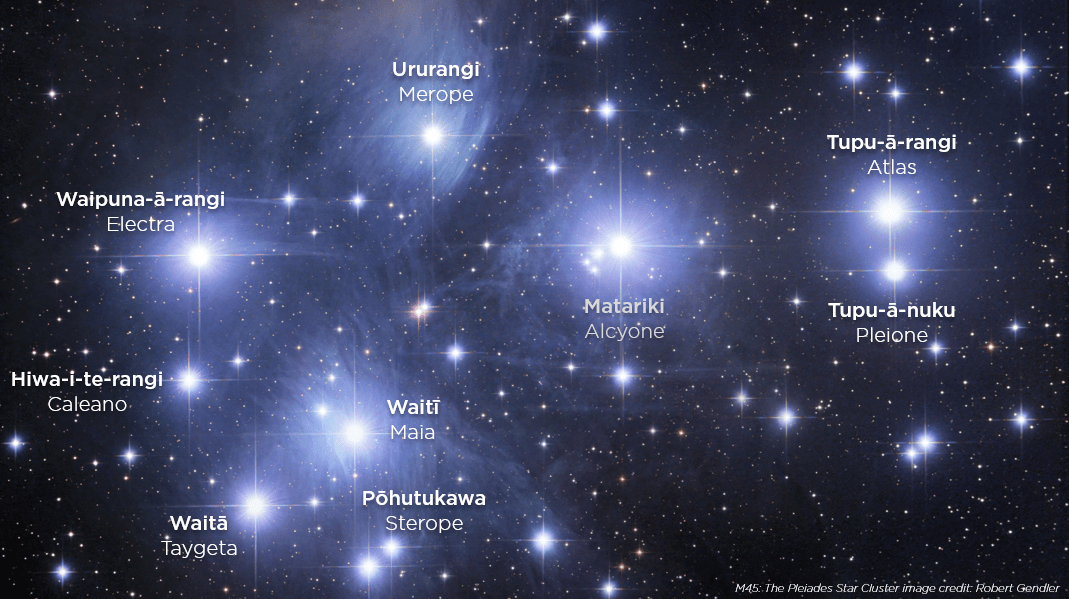
Māori and Greek names for the nine stars of Matariki

To the ancient Greeks, the Pleiades contained nine stars: the parents Atlas and Pleione, positioned to one side of the cluster, and their seven daughters Alcyone, Maia, Taygeta, Electra, Merope, Celaeno and Sterope.

Many Māori sources, especially older ones, list seven stars in Matariki: Matariki herself, the central star in the cluster (the kai whakahaere or 'conductor'), and six children. The emblem of the Kīngitanga or Māori King movement, Te Paki o Matariki, includes the star Matariki flanked by three stars on each side. The six other stars are sometimes named as Matariki's daughters.

It has been suggested that the idea of Matariki as a group of seven female stars was influenced by the concept of the Pleiades' "seven sisters". Others claim the near-universal tradition of recognising seven stars is based on astronomical observations made up to 100,000 years ago, maintained through oral histories in various cultures.

The manuscript of Rāwiri Te Kōkau passed on to Rangi Mātāmua recognised nine stars in Matariki, adding Pōhutukawa and Hiwa-i-te-Rangi (also known just as Hiwa) to make a total of eight children, five of which were female and three male. The father of Matariki's children was Rehua, paramount chief of the heavens, identified by Māori as the star Antares.

The stars of Matariki and their genders as recorded by Te Kōkau are identified with particular traits and areas of influence, also reflected in their positions in the star cluster:

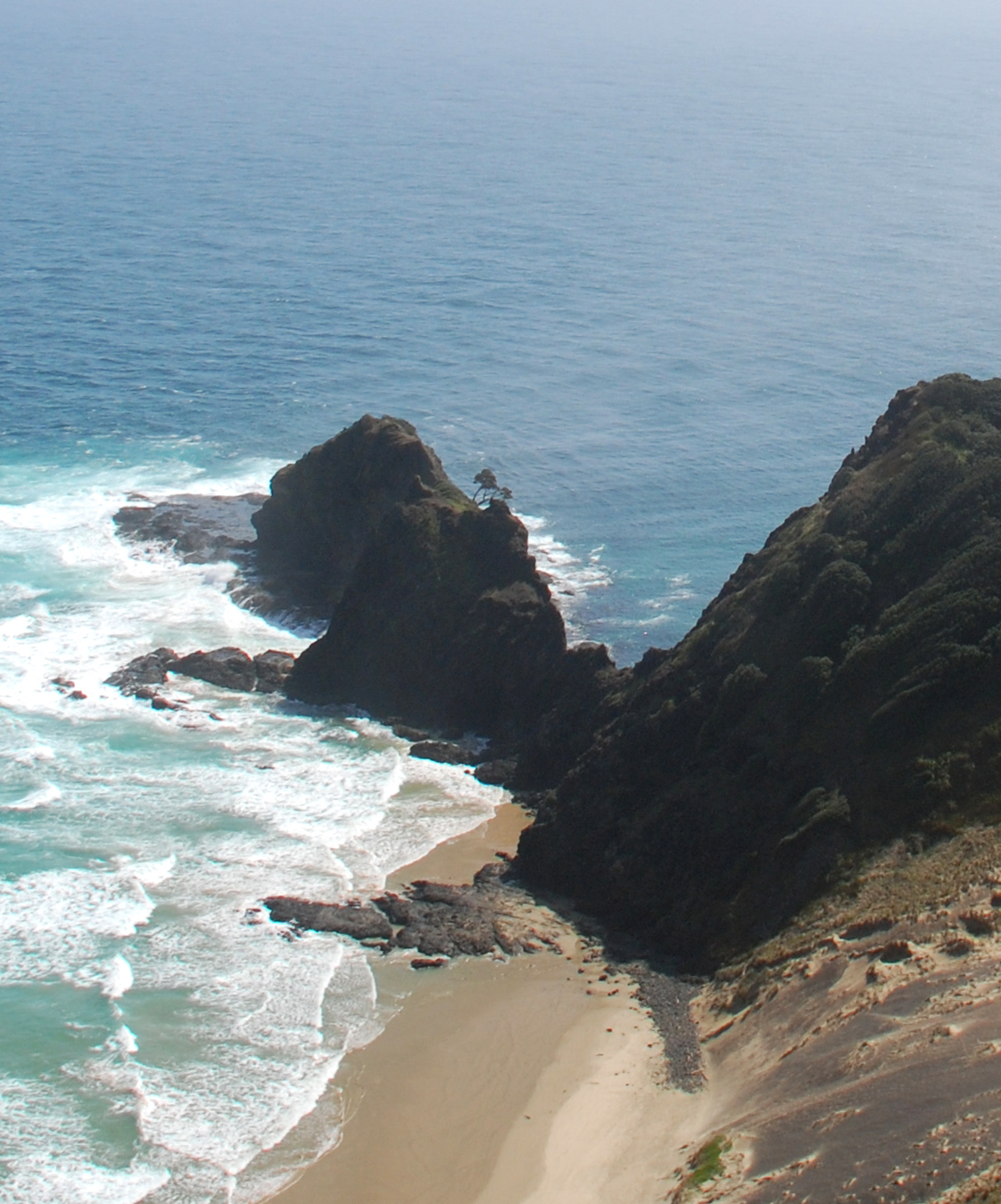
The lone pōhutukawa tree at Cape Reinga marks Te Rerenga Wairua, the departing place of the spirits of the dead

The nine stars of Matariki
Māori	Greek	Gender	Provenance
Matariki	Alcyone	Female	Well-being and health
Tupuārangi	Atlas	Male	Food that comes from above
Tupuānuku	Pleione	Female	Food that grows in the soil
Ururangi	Merope	Male	The winds
Waipunārangi	Electra	Female	Rainwater
Hiwaiterangi	Celaeno	Female	Growth and prosperity
Waitī	Maia	Female	Fresh water
Waitā	Taygeta	Male	The ocean
Pōhutukawa	Sterope	Female	The deceased

The star Pōhutukawa's association with the departed relates to the lone pōhutukawa tree at Te Rerenga Wairua (Cape Reinga), the departing place for the spirits of the deceased as they return to the ancestral homeland of Hawaiki. Mourning the deceased is one component of the Matariki celebration.

Hiwa-i-te-rangi, also known just as Hiwa, is the youngest of Matariki's children and was considered the "wishing star": Māori would rest their hopes and desires on Hiwa, similar to "wishing upon a star", and if it appeared to shine bright and clear on the first viewing of Matariki those individual and collective wishes were likely to be answered.

== Māori New Year ==
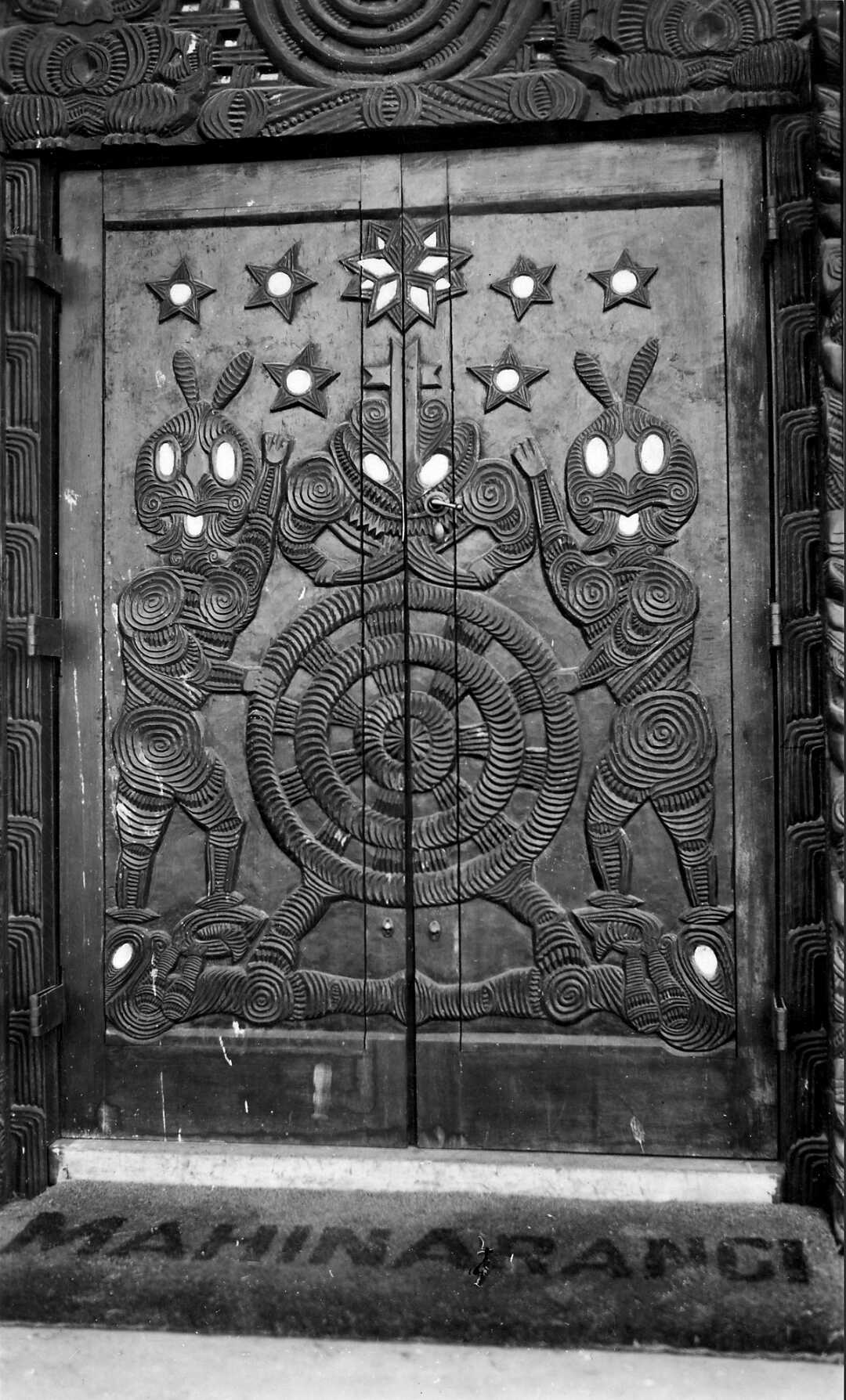
Door displaying Matariki as part of the Kīngitanga coat of arms, Te Māhinārangi meeting house, Tūrangawaewae marae, Ngāruawāhia

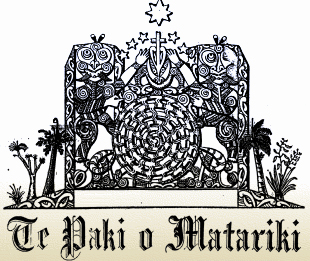
Masthead of Te Paki o Matariki, newspaper of the Kīngitanga movement, showing the stars of Matariki

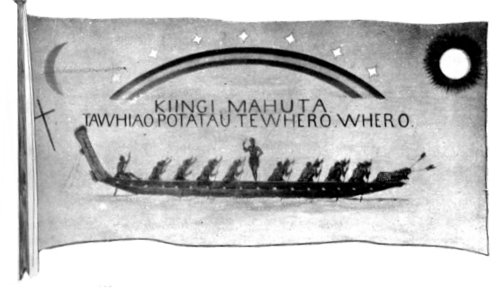
Kīngitanga flag from Waahi, showing the seven stars of Matariki

Traditional Māori culture was interwoven with astronomical knowledge, with constellations and the lunar cycle used for navigation, planting and harvesting, delineating the seasons, and marking the spawning and migration of fish. This knowledge was passed down by oral tradition, and different regions and iwi (tribes) recorded different dates, significant constellations, and traditional calendars or maramataka.

The Pleiades constellation (Matariki) is visible for most of the year in New Zealand, except for approximately a month in the middle of winter. Matariki finally sets in the west in the early evening in May, and reappears just prior to sunrise in late June or early July, which begins the first month of the Māori lunar calendar, Pipiri (meaning to huddle together). All the months of the Māori calendar are indicated by this heliacal rising of a particular star on the eastern horizon just before dawn, on the night of the new moon: for example, the tenth month, Poutūterangi, is signalled by the heliacal rising of Altair. Matariki's role in signalling the start of the year means it is known as te whetū o te tau ("the star of the year").

The time in midsummer when Matariki is overhead in the night sky is referred to as te paki o Matariki, i.e. the calm weather of summer – a phrase meaning good weather and good fortune. Because of these associations with peace and calm, the second Māori king, Matutaera Tāwhiao, chose Matariki as an emblem, and the Kīngitanga newspaper was named Te Paki o Matariki.

Most celebration of Matariki begins in the last quarter phase of the moon after the constellation's first appearance, during 3–4 nights known as "the nights of Tangaroa" (ngā po o Tangaroa), and finishes on the night before the new moon. The new moon, or whiro, is considered inauspicious in the Māori calendar, so would spoil any celebrations. Because Māori traditionally use a 354-day lunar calendar with 29.5 days to the month, rather than the 365-day Gregorian solar calendar, the dates of Matariki vary each year. Māori did not use a single unified lunar calendar, and different iwi might recognise different numbers of months, give them different names, or start the month on the full moon rather than the new moon.

=== Puanga and Matariki ===
There has also always been regional variation across Aotearoa, in which stars signal the start of the New Year, and what date is chosen to celebrate it. Some iwi – specifically those in the far north of Te Ika-a-Māui (the North Island), the mid-western parts of Te Ika-a-Māui around Taranaki, the Chatham Islands, and much of Te Waipounamu (South Island) – celebrate Puanga, using the rising of the brighter star Rigel (Puanga in northern Māori, Puaka in southern Māori) as the marker of the New Year, instead of Matariki. This is sometimes attributed to Puanga being more visible or visible earlier than Matariki, but, as Rangi Mātāmua puts it, "the variation in the rising between Matariki and Puanga is very small, and if the Tangaroa nights of Piripi are observed correctly, then both stars will be seen in the morning sky." It has been suggested that that tradition of Puaka belonged to the first Polynesian settlers to arrive in Aotearoa, and Matariki was brought by a second wave of arrivals, who also brought the first kūmara (with which Matariki is associated).

In Māori tradition the stars Puanga and Matariki were rivals, with Puanga beautifying herself every winter, attempting to be the star beside which the sun rises and signals the New Year, but being eternally frustrated when each year the Sun rose beside Matariki.

Other iwi use Atutahi (Canopus) rather than Puanga, or the setting of Rehua (Antares) in winter, to mark the New Year.

== Traditional celebration ==
Matariki was an occasion to mourn the deceased, celebrate the present, and prepare the ground for the coming year. The ceremony had three parts: viewing the stars, remembering the deceased, and making an offering of food to the stars. In addition, certain birds and fish were associated with Matariki: to Tūhoe it marked the beginning of the season where kererū or native pigeon could be captured, cooked, and preserved in its own fat, and the rise of Matariki corresponded with the return of korokoro (lampreys) from the sea to spawn in rivers.

Food traditionally associated with Matariki

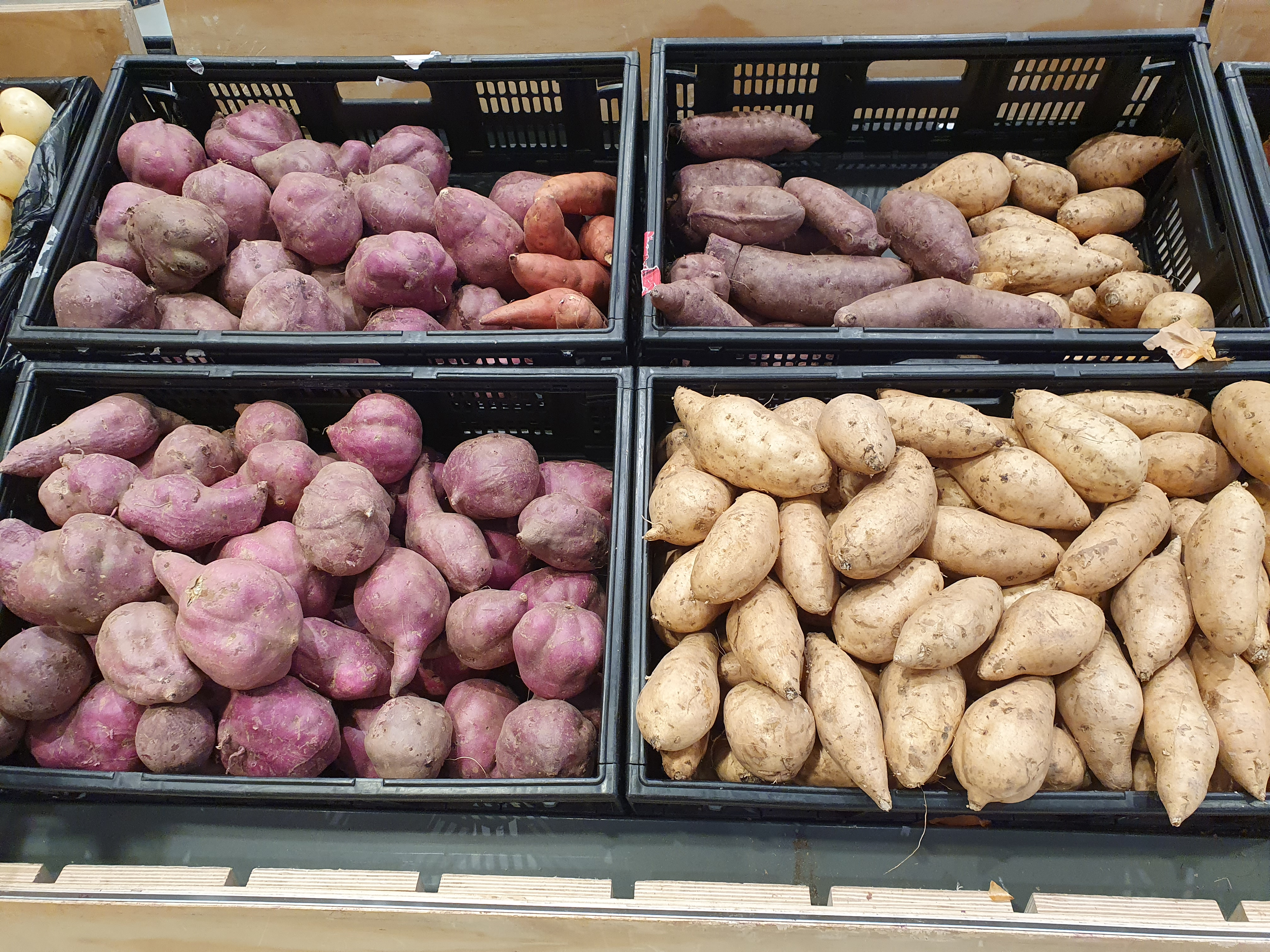
Kūmara (Ipomoea batatas)

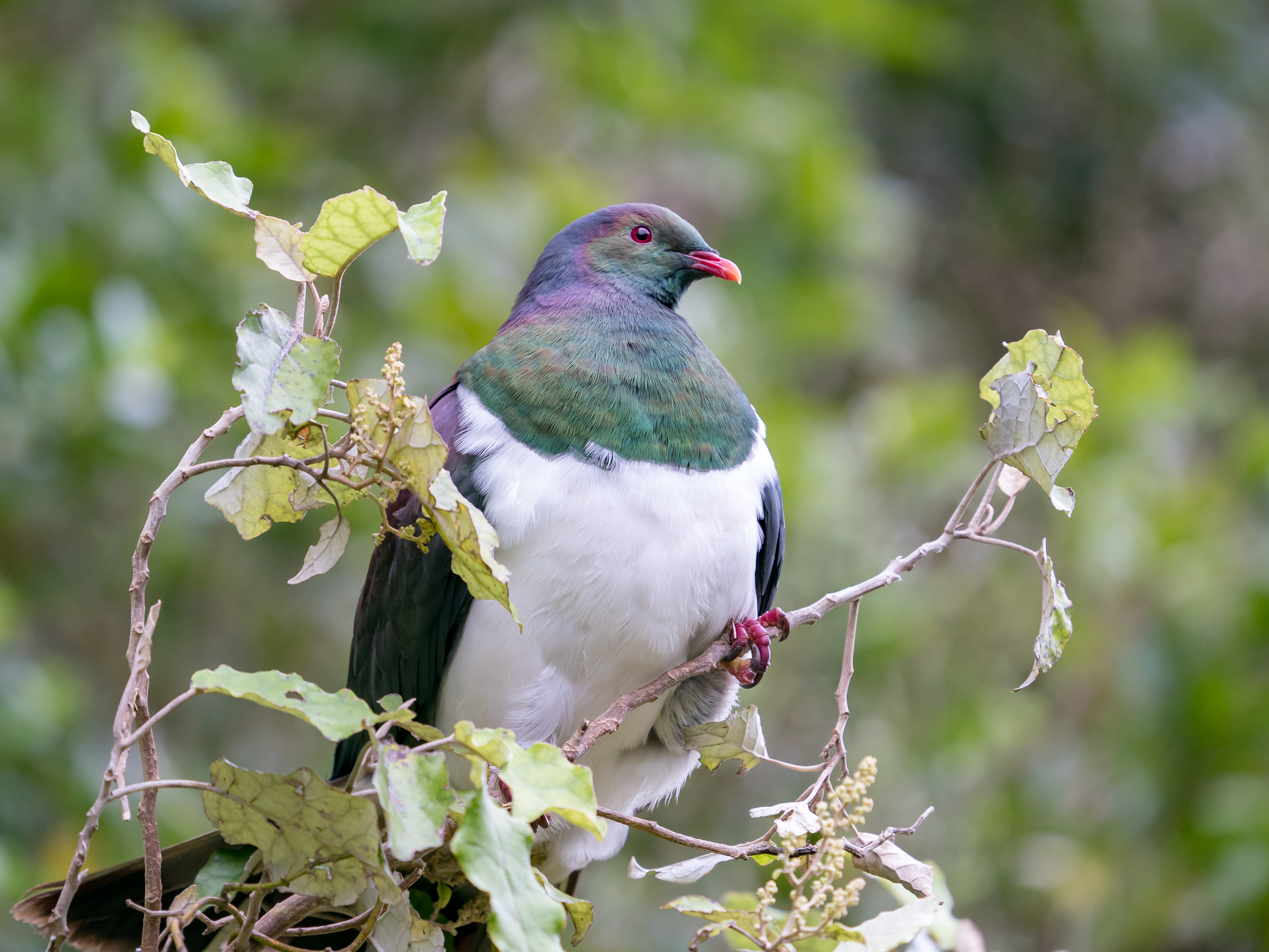
Kererū (Hemiphaga novaeseelandiae)

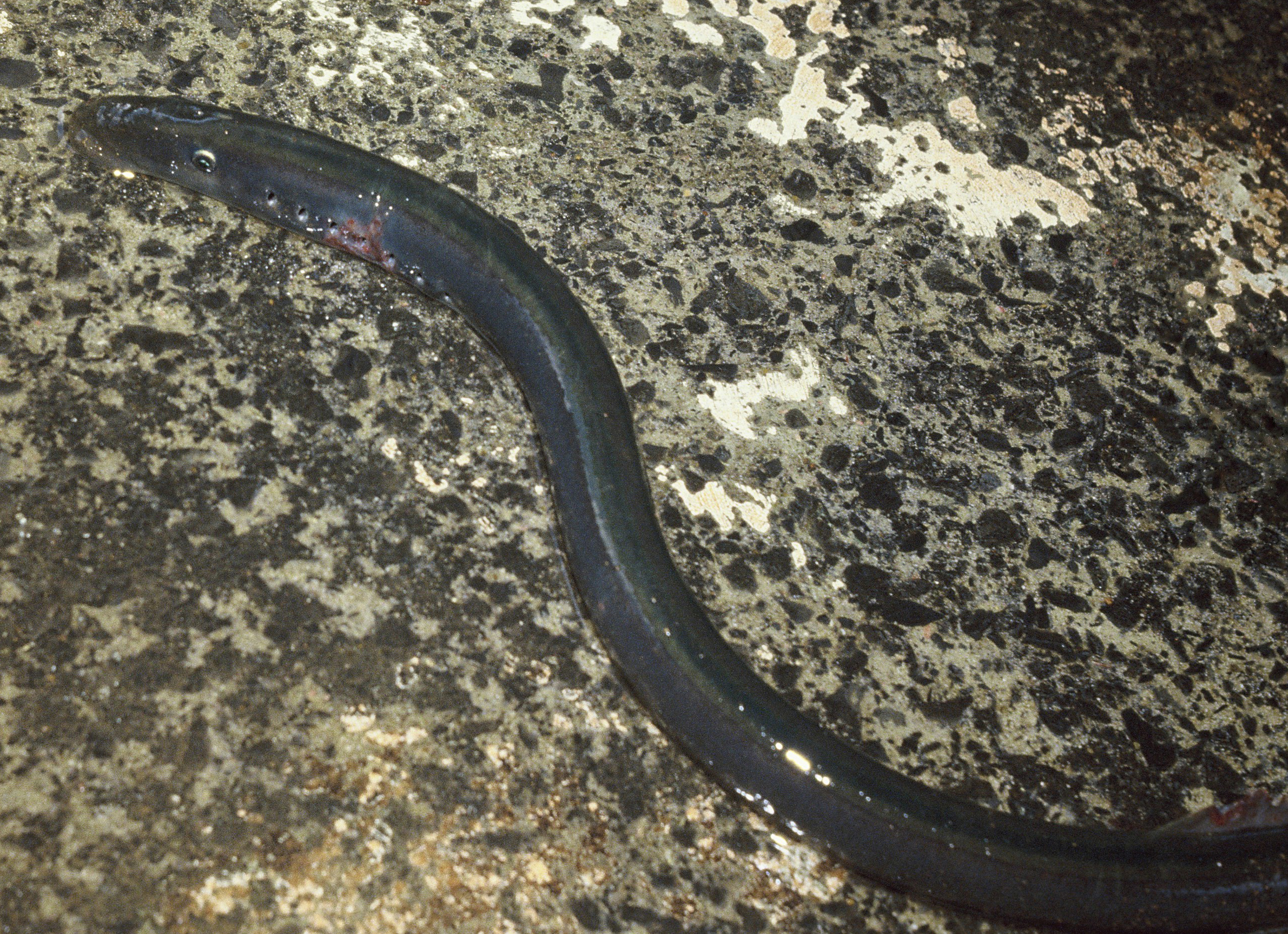
Korokoro (Geotria australis)

=== Viewing ===
Because of the frequent poor weather in winter, the viewing of Matariki was spread across the three or four nights of Tangaroa to increase the chance that the stars would be clearly seen. The first clear night marked the beginning of festivities. When Matariki reappeared, Māori would look to its stars for a forecast of the coming season's prosperity: if they shone clear and bright, the remaining winter would be warm, but hazy or twinkling stars predicted bad weather in the season ahead. The colour, brightness, and distinctiveness of each star in Matariki would be assessed, and forecasts made according to each of their associations: for example, if Tupu-ā-rangi did not shine clearly then hunters would expect a poor catch of birds in the coming season. Pōhutukawa was linked to the deceased, so its brightness would signal how many people were likely to pass away in the coming year. These predictions were made by tohunga kōkōrangi, learned elders who had studied and debated for many years in a whare kōkōrangi (house of astronomical learning).

=== Remembering the deceased ===
After the forecasts for the year had been read from the stars, the deceased were invoked with tears and song in a ceremony called te taki mōteatea ("the reciting of laments"). The names of everyone who had died since Matariki's last rising were recited. Traditionally, Māori believed that the spirits of the dead were collected during the year and at the setting of Matariki in the month of Hautara they were led into the afterlife. On the rising of Matariki at the start of the year, the deceased of the past year were carried up from the underworld and cast up into the night sky to become stars, accompanied by prayers and the recitation of their names. Beginning the mourning for the previous year's departed at Matariki is still reflected in modern Māori mourning practices.

=== Offering of food ===
An important part of the celebration was whāngai i te hautapu, a ceremonial offering of food to the stars. The reasoning was that Matariki, after shepherding the spirits of the dead up from the underworld and turning the sun back from the winter solstice, would be weak and in need of sustenance. A small hāngī or earth oven was built, with heated stones in a pit on which was placed food, a layer of leaves, and earth. The uncovering of the cooked food released steam which rose into the sky and fed the stars, the steam being the hautapu or sacred offering. The food was chosen to correspond with the domains of the stars in Matariki: these might include kūmara for Tupuānuku, a bird for Tupuārangi, freshwater fish for Waitī, and shellfish for Waitā. The offering of food was the final part of the ceremony, which ended at sunrise.

The Matariki ceremony was followed by days of festivities – song, dance, and feasting – known as te mātahi o te tau ("the first fruits of the year"), celebrating prosperity, life, and the promise of the year to come.

== Modern observance ==
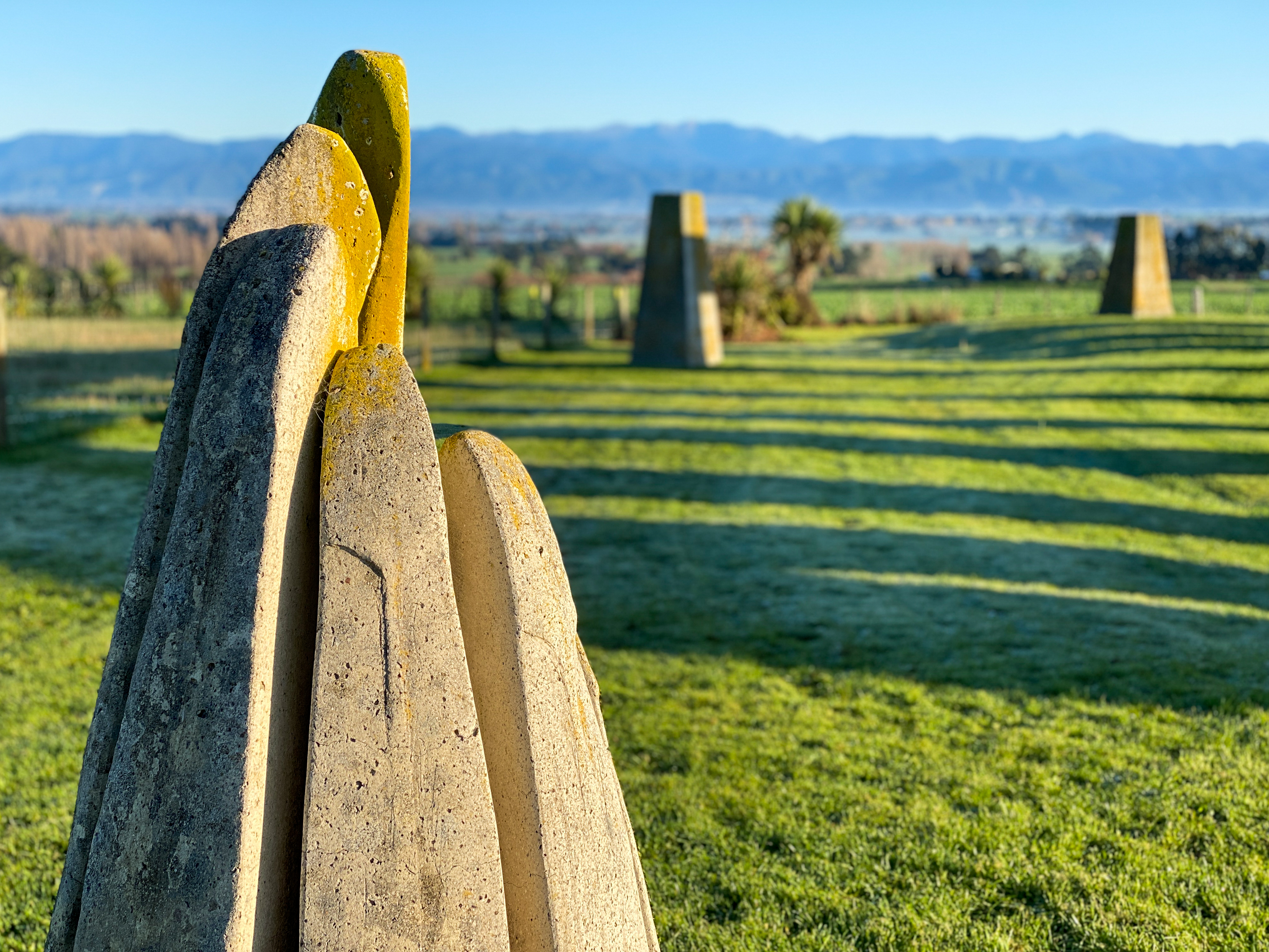
The Fingers of Mother Earth sculpture at Stonehenge Aotearoa marks the heliacal rise of Matariki

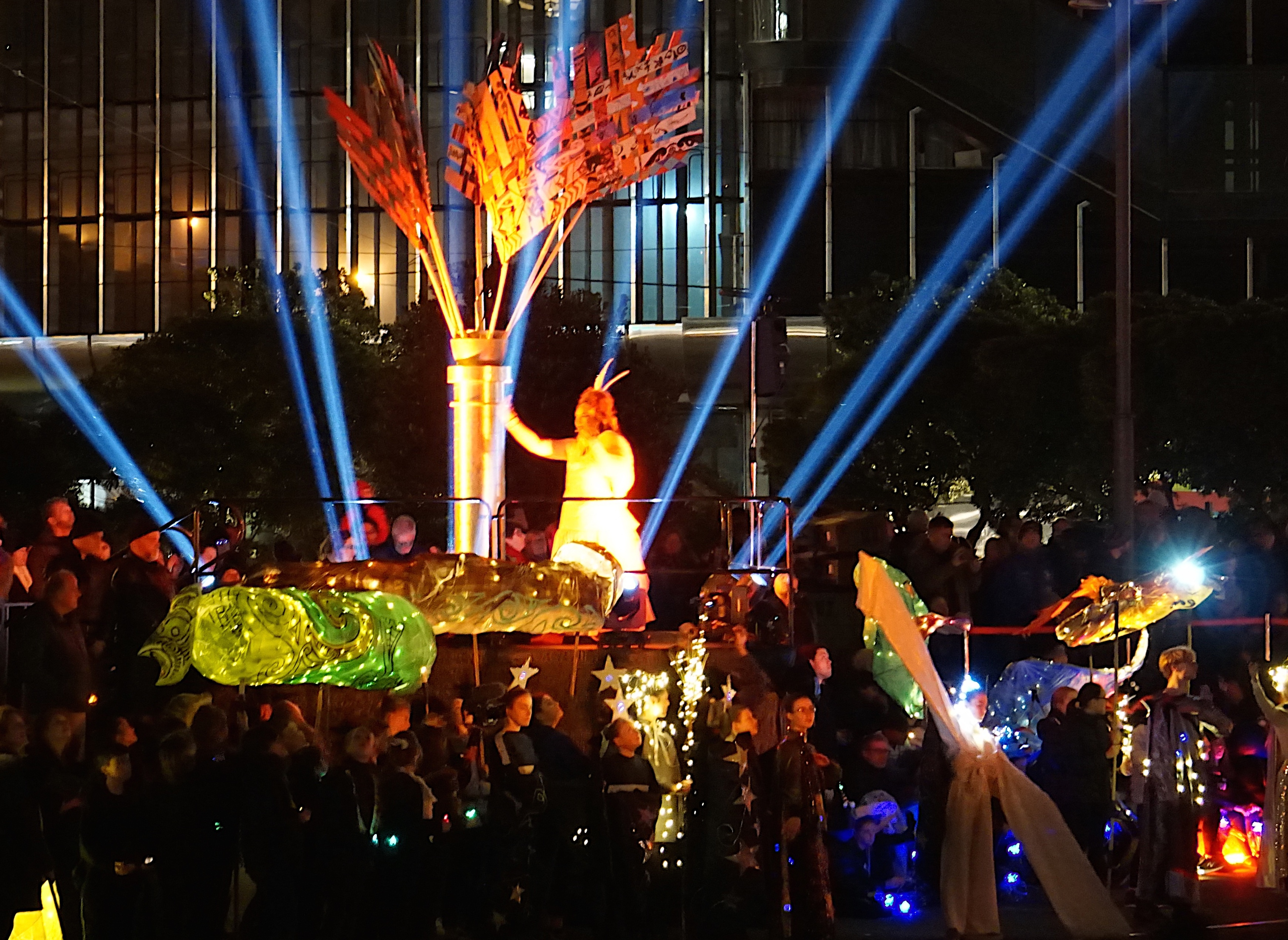
Ahi Kā festival of fire and light celebrating Matariki, Wellington, June 2018

With the colonisation of New Zealand by Pākehā settlers in the 19th century, many traditional Māori practices began to decline. Some aspects of Matariki were incorporated into new religious traditions such as the Ringatū church, but its traditional celebration had almost ceased by the early 20th century. The last of the traditional Matariki celebrations were recorded in the 1940s. Dansey records the ceremony being still practised in the 1880s or 1890s, and gives an account of one elderly New Plymouth woman carrying on the custom on her own until her death in 1941.

The revival of the celebration of Matariki can be traced to the early 1990s, sparked by various Māori iwi and organisations such as the Museum of New Zealand Te Papa Tongarewa, for example in 1995 there was a festival called Pipitea Marae: Te Whakanui i a Matariki, at Pipitea Marae, Wellington City supported by Te Awa Kairangi Community Arts, Te Atiawa FM, Ernst & Young and Te Taura Whiri.

Te Rangi Huata of Ngāti Kahungunu began in 2000 an annual Matariki celebration in Hastings, which attracted 500 people, which reached 15,000 in 2001. In 2001, the Māori Language Commission began a move to "reclaim Matariki, or Aotearoa Pacific New Year, as an important focus for Māori language regeneration". In 2016 Te Wānanga o Aotearoa promoted a new vision of Matariki in a month-long roadshow called "Te Iwa o Matariki" (iwa being Māori for "nine"), stressing the nine stars recognised by some iwi.

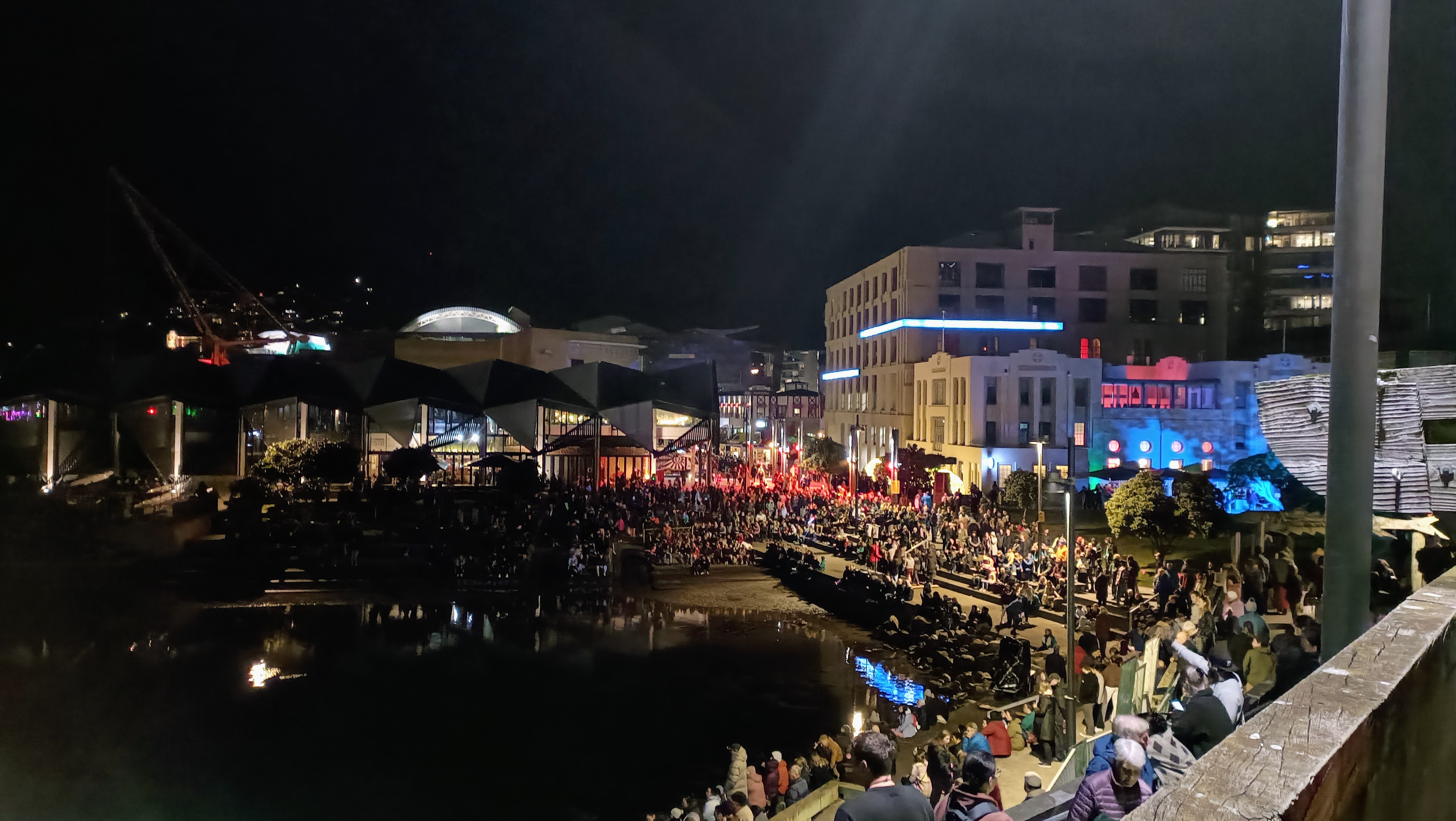
Ahi Kā festival, Wellington 2023

Since then it has increasingly become common practice for people – Māori and non-Māori – and institutions such as schools, libraries, and city councils to celebrate Matariki in a range of ways. These have included concerts, festivals of lights, the illumination of Auckland's Sky Tower, and tree planting. In 2017 Wellington City Council announced they would cancel the Sky Show fireworks held on Guy Fawkes Night for 22 years, and move them to a Matariki cultural festival from July 2018. The celebrations have taken place over the period of a week or month, anywhere from early June to late August, but increasingly coincide with the winter solstice or the traditional dates of Matariki.

In 2008 NZ Post began issuing an annual series of stamps to celebrate Matariki.

=== Public holiday ===
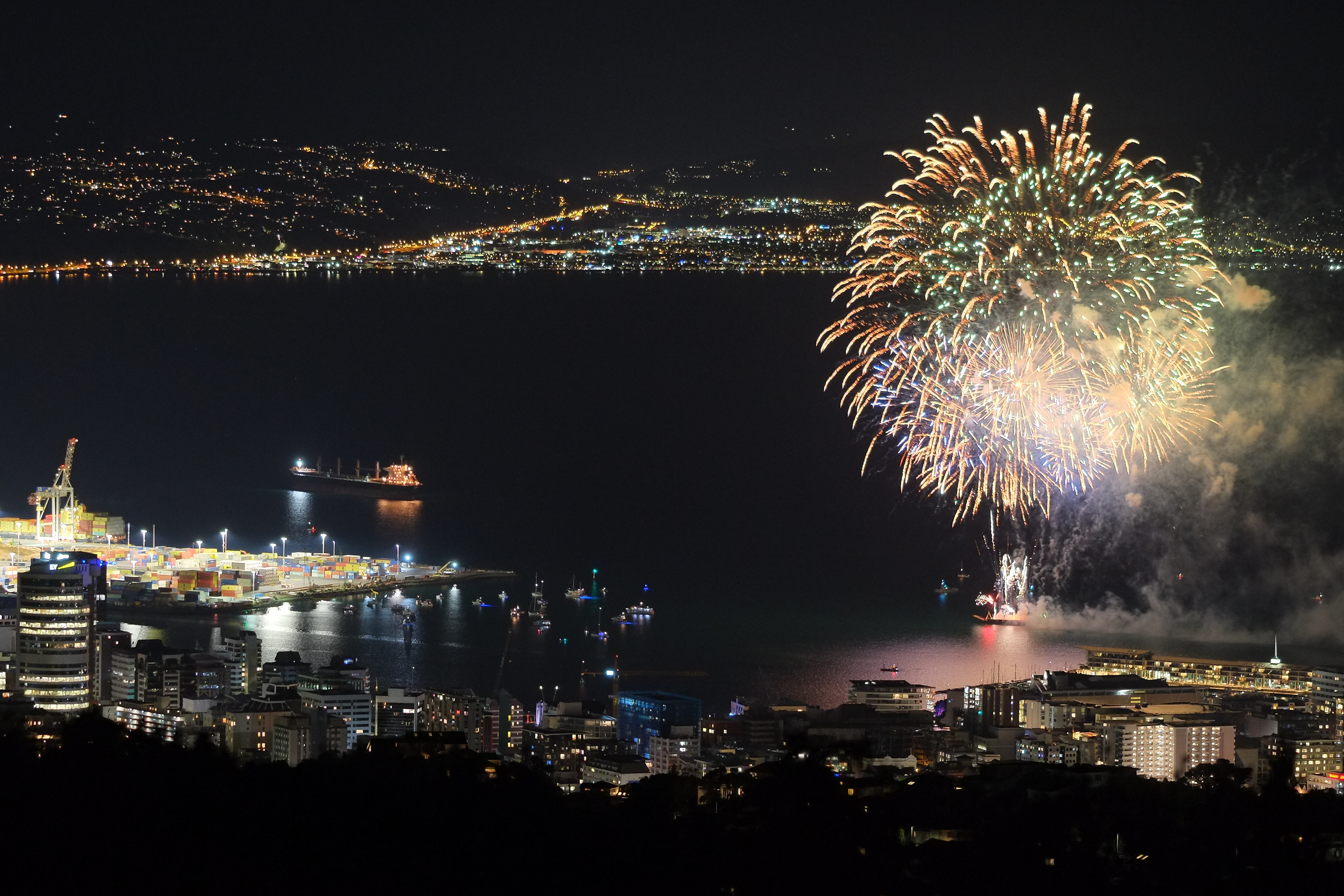
Fireworks in Wellington on first Matariki public holiday in 2022

A proposal to make Matariki an official public holiday in New Zealand was made by former Māori Party MP Rahui Katene's member's bill Te Ra o Matariki Bill/Matariki Day Bill, drawn from the ballot in June 2009. The Bill would have fixed the date of a public holiday using the new moon in June; this was later changed to the new moon of the heliacal rising of Matariki when the bill was drawn a month later and set down for introduction into Parliament. Mayor of Waitakere City Bob Harvey supported the call to make Matariki a public holiday to replace Queen's Birthday, along with the Republican Movement of Aotearoa New Zealand, which found none of New Zealand's local authorities held celebrations for Queen's Birthday but many celebrated Matariki. However, the Bill itself did not propose abolishing Queen's Birthday, and was voted down at its first reading.

As part of the National–Māori Party agreement subsequent to the 2011 New Zealand general election, both parties agreed to support a "cultural heritage bill to recognise Matariki/Puanga, and to honour the peace-making heritage established at Parihaka."

In July 2020, Te Raukura O'Connell Rapira delivered two combined petitions calling for Matariki to be made a public holiday that were signed by 30,000 people.

On 7 September 2020, Prime Minister Jacinda Ardern pledged to make Matariki a public holiday if the Labour Party were re-elected in the 2020 general election. The proposed public holiday would not be implemented until 2022, during which businesses could recover from the economic impacts of the COVID-19 pandemic in New Zealand. On 4 February 2021, Ardern announced the first date for the public holiday as 24 June 2022. Legislation to give this legal effect would be introduced during the 2021 parliamentary session.

On 2 July 2021, the day the constellation rose, Ardern announced the proposed dates of the holiday for the next 30 years, as determined by a Matariki Advisory Group drawn from iwi across the country. The date of the holiday was formalised as the Friday closest to the 4 days of the nights of Tangaroa in the lunar month Piripi. The dates vary from late June to mid July, but are always on a Friday, to encourage people to travel and spend time with their families, and to give an extra public holiday to people who usually miss out on Mondayised public holidays (e.g. those who normally work Tuesday to Saturday). The date of Matariki varies because the 354-day Māori lunar calendar (with occasional intercalary months) only approximates the 365.24 day solar Gregorian solar calendar.

On 30 September 2021, Associate Minister for Arts, Culture and Heritage Kiri Allan introduced the Te Kāhui o Matariki Public Holiday Bill to make Matariki a public holiday. The bill passed its first reading supported by the Labour, Green and Māori parties, but opposed by National and ACT. National argued that Matariki should replace an existing public holiday instead of being added as a new holiday, to lessen the impact on businesses which is estimated to be NZ$448 million annually. The bill passed its second reading on 29 March 2022. During the debate, the National and ACT parties expressed concerns about creating a 12th public holiday; claiming that it would cost NZ$450 million and have a negative impact on businesses. The Labour, Green and Māori parties argued that the bill would establish a new Māori public holiday in the calendar and raise awareness of Māori indigenous knowledge.

The bill passed its third reading on 7 April. During the final debate, National MP Paul Goldsmith argued that Matariki should replace a previous public holiday while ACT's Small Business spokesperson Chris Baillie claimed that having a new public holiday would cost businesses NZ$453 million. The Bill's sponsor Kiritapu Allan defended Matariki, arguing that public holidays reduced employee burnout and stress while boosting hospitality and tourism. National MP Simon O'Connor suggested naming the bill a "neutral" name such as Pleiades, which prompted Crown-Māori Relations Minister Kelvin Davis to claim that the former's remarks showed National's contempt for Māori culture. The bill received royal assent on 11 April 2022.

Matariki was first observed as a public holiday on 24 June 2022, including a pre-dawn live broadcast of a hautapu ceremony. It was received positively overall by New Zealanders. Its significance to New Zealanders is also enhanced by being exclusive to New Zealand culture.

Dates of Matariki
Year	Tangaroa lunar period	Matariki public holiday
2022	21–24 June	24 June
2023	10–13 July	14 July
2024	29 June – 2 July	28 June
2025	19–22 June	20 June
2026	8–11 July	10 July
2027	27–30 June	25 June
2028	15–18 July	14 July
2029	4–7 July	6 July
2030	23–26 June	21 June
2031	11–14 July	11 July
2032	30 June – 2 July	2 July
2033	20–23 June	24 June
2034	9–12 July	7 July
2035	29 June – 1 July	29 June

In 2024, Charles III, as King of New Zealand, released a message recognising the holiday in both English and Māori. On 30 April that year, President of French Polynesia Moetai Brotherson in a session with his Council of Ministers, following a proposal by its Minister of Culture Eliane Tevahitua, agreed to make their local counterpart Matariʻi as an official public holiday starting 20 November 2025, in place of Internal Autonomy Day on 29 June, inspired by the success of the celebrations in Aotearoa.

For businesses, Matariki is treated identically to most other public holidays; employees working on Matariki are required to be paid time-and-a-half and there are no restrictions on shops opening or alcohol sales. However, due to the unique cultural significance of the holiday, Māori cultural advisers and academics have warned companies against commercialising Matariki, citing cultural disrespect. Due to its position between King's Birthday and Labour Day, concerns were made regarding overcommercialisation of Matariki in terms of appropriating the extended public holiday as an opportunity for shopping events, such as the sale of fireworks. There are concerns regarding the impact of commercialisation on Matariki in the future, potentially associating the holiday with binge-drinking instead of time with whānau (family) as intended.

== See also ==
- Matariki, a 2010 New Zealand drama film set in Ōtara, South Auckland
- Makahiki, an ancient Hawaiian New Year festival
- Matrikas, the Seven Mothers in Hindu tradition, often identified with the Krittika (Pleiades) constellation
