= Sterope (star) =

Double star in the constellation Taurus

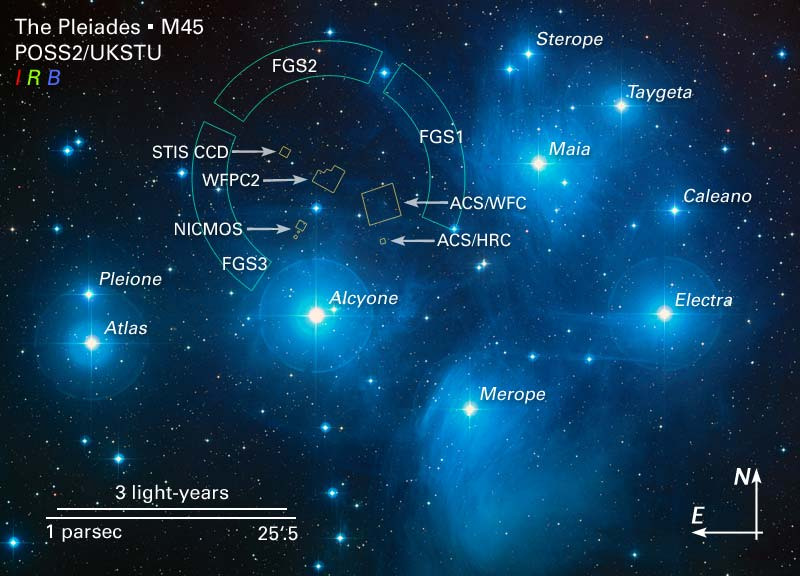
Position of the Asterope pair in the Pleiades

The Sterope /ˈstɛroʊpi/ or Asterope /əˈstɛrəpi/ system is a double star in the zodiac constellation of Taurus. Its components have the Flamsteed designations 21 Tauri and 22 Tauri, and are sometimes known as Sterope I and Sterope II, respectively.

The International Astronomical Union applies the name Asterope specifically to 21 Tauri. The two stars are thus

- 21 Tauri (or Sterope I, formally Asterope)
- 22 Tauri (or Sterope II)

The two stars are separated by 0.047° on the sky, which is equal to 2.82 arc-minutes and thus closer than the usual naked-eye resolution limit of 4 arc-min, giving an elongated appearance of the two together. Both are members of the Pleiades open star cluster (M45) and approximately 440 light-years from the Sun.

== Nomenclature ==
Asterope was one of the Pleiades sisters in Greek mythology.

In 2016, the International Astronomical Union organized a Working Group on Star Names (WGSN) to catalogue and standardize proper names for stars. The WGSN decided to attribute proper names to individual stars rather than entire multiple systems. It approved the name Asterope for 21 Tauri on 21 August 2016 and it is now so included in the List of IAU-approved Star Names.

=== Namesake ===
USS Sterope (AK-96) was a United States Navy Crater class cargo ship named after the star.

== Cultural meaning ==
In Māori tradition the star is known as Pōhutukawa, which forms part of the Matariki cluster. It is said to be a female being linked to the dead, whose absence in the night sky portends upcoming death.

== See also ==
- Pleiades in folklore and literature
- Taurus (Chinese astronomy)
