= USS Celeno =

Cargo ship of the United States Navy

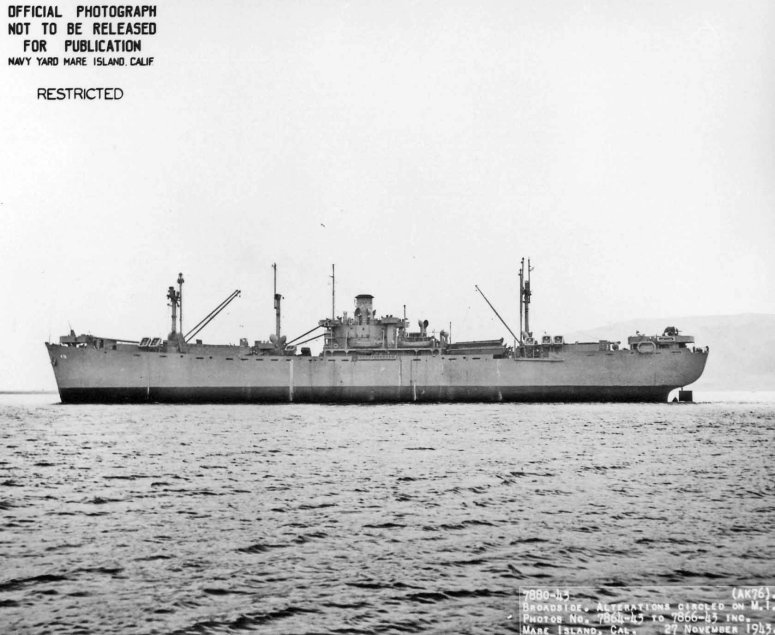
- USS Celeno (AK-76), November 1943

History

United States
- Name: Redfield Proctor; Celeno
- Namesake: Redfield Proctor; The star Celaeno
- Ordered: as a Type EC2-S-C1 hull, MCE hull 439
- Builder: Permanente Metals Corporation, Richmond, California
- Cost: $1,112,554
- Yard number: 439
- Way number: 6
- Laid down: 3 November 1942
- Launched: 12 December 1942
- Sponsored by: Mrs. G. G. Sherwood
- Acquired: 19 December 1942
- Commissioned: 2 January 1943
- Decommissioned: 1 March 1946
- Stricken: 20 March 1946
- Identification: Hull symbol: AK-76; Code letters: NYJY
- Honours and awards: 3 × battle stars
- Fate: Sold for scrapping, 14 March 1961, completed, 4 August 1961

General characteristics
- Class & type: Crater-class cargo ship
- Displacement: 4,023 long tons (4,088 t) (standard); 14,550 long tons (14,780 t) (full load)
- Length: 441 ft 6 in (134.57 m)
- Beam: 56 ft 11 in (17.35 m)
- Draft: 28 ft 4 in (8.64 m)
- Installed power: 2 × Oil fired 450 °F (232 °C) boilers, operating at 220 psi (1,500 kPa) , (manufactured by Babcock & Wilcox); 2,500 shp (1,900 kW)
- Propulsion: 1 × Vertical triple-expansion reciprocating steam engine, (manufactured by Joshua Hendy); 1 × screw propeller
- Speed: 12.5 kn (23.2 km/h; 14.4 mph)
- Capacity: 7,800 t (7,700 long tons) DWT; 444,206 cu ft (12,578.5 m^{3}) (non-refrigerated)
- Complement: 207
- Armament: 1 × 5 in (127 mm)/38 caliber dual-purpose (DP) gun; 1 × 3 in (76 mm)/50 caliber DP gun; 2 × 40 mm (1.57 in) Bofors anti-aircraft (AA) gun mounts; 6 × 20 mm (0.79 in) Oerlikon cannon AA gun mounts

USS Celeno (AK-76) was a Crater-class cargo ship in the service of the US Navy in World War II. Named with a variant spelling of the star Celaeno in the constellation Pleiades, it was the only ship of the Navy to bear this name.

== Construction ==
Celeno was laid down 3 November 1942 as liberty ship SS Redfield Proctor, MCE hull 439, by Permanente Metals Corporation, Yard No. 2, Richmond, California, under a Maritime Commission (MARCOM) contract; launched 12 December 1942; sponsored by Mrs. G. G. Sherwood; transferred to the Navy 19 December 1942; and commissioned 2 January 1943.

== Service history ==
Celeno joined the Pacific Fleet and cleared San Francisco 10 January 1943 with cargo for Nouméa, New Caledonia. She arrived 1 February to support the operations on Guadalcanal and throughout the Solomons with cargo brought from New Zealand to Nouméa, Tulagi, and Guadalcanal itself.

Unloading cargo off Guadalcanal on 16 June, Celeno was attacked by a swarm of Japanese bombers. As the freighter's antiaircraft guns began to fire, the dive bombers scored three near misses, then hit Celeno's stern, putting her 5-inch (127 mm)/38 caliber gun out of operation. Her men stood to the remaining guns, and aided in downing at least three enemy planes and damaging several others. A second direct hit set two of Celeno's holds on fire, and another near miss sent her deck cargo of diesel oil and gasoline flaming. With her rudder jammed from the first hit, Celeno circled, as her crew determined to save her. Skillful damage control and seamanship beached her safely on Lunga Point, and when the air attack had been fought off, Celeno was towed off for repairs at Port Purvis on Florida Island in the Solomons. Fifteen of her crew were killed and 19 wounded in the attack.

Further repairs at Espiritu Santo and San Francisco fitted Celeno for action once more, and the ship returned to the South Pacific in January 1944 to continue her support of the Solomons campaign. As the seizure of bases in the Admiralty Islands began, Celeno brought troops and cargo to Manus through the spring of 1944, and continued to operate throughout the Solomons, Bismarcks, and Marianas. She sailed to Australia and New Zealand, then made a cargo run to newly secured Iwo Jima. Returning to Nouméa, Celeno performed rear-area support for the Okinawa operation by voyages to Eniwetok and Ulithi, en route to Okinawa itself, where she arrived 18 June. She returned to Ulithi 3 July, and resumed cargo operations throughout the South Pacific.

In November 1945, Celeno sailed to Iwo Jima to embark troops for transportation to Saipan, where she picked up another group of men bound for the west coast.

== Decommission and final disposition ==
Celeno was decommissioned at San Francisco, 1 March 1946, and transferred to MARCOM. She was delivered to Suisun Bay, California, the same day for layup in the National Defense Reserve Fleet. She was sold to Union Minerals & Alloys Corporation, for $65,139.89 on 14 March 1961, for scrapping. She was removed, 6 June 1961. Her scrapping was completed 4 August 1961.

== Awards ==
Celeno received three battle stars for World War II service.

== Bibliography ==
- "Celeno". Dictionary of American Naval Fighting Ships. Naval History and Heritage Command. This article incorporates text from this source, which is in the public domain.
- "Kaiser Permanente No. 2, Richmond CA". ShipbuildingHistory.com. 13 October 2010.
- "USS Celeno (AK-76)". NavSource. 4 April 2014.
- "REDFIELD PROCTOR". United States Department of Transportation. Archived from the original on 12 December 2019.
- "SS REDFIELD PROCTOR".
