= 22 Tauri =

Star in the constellation Taurus

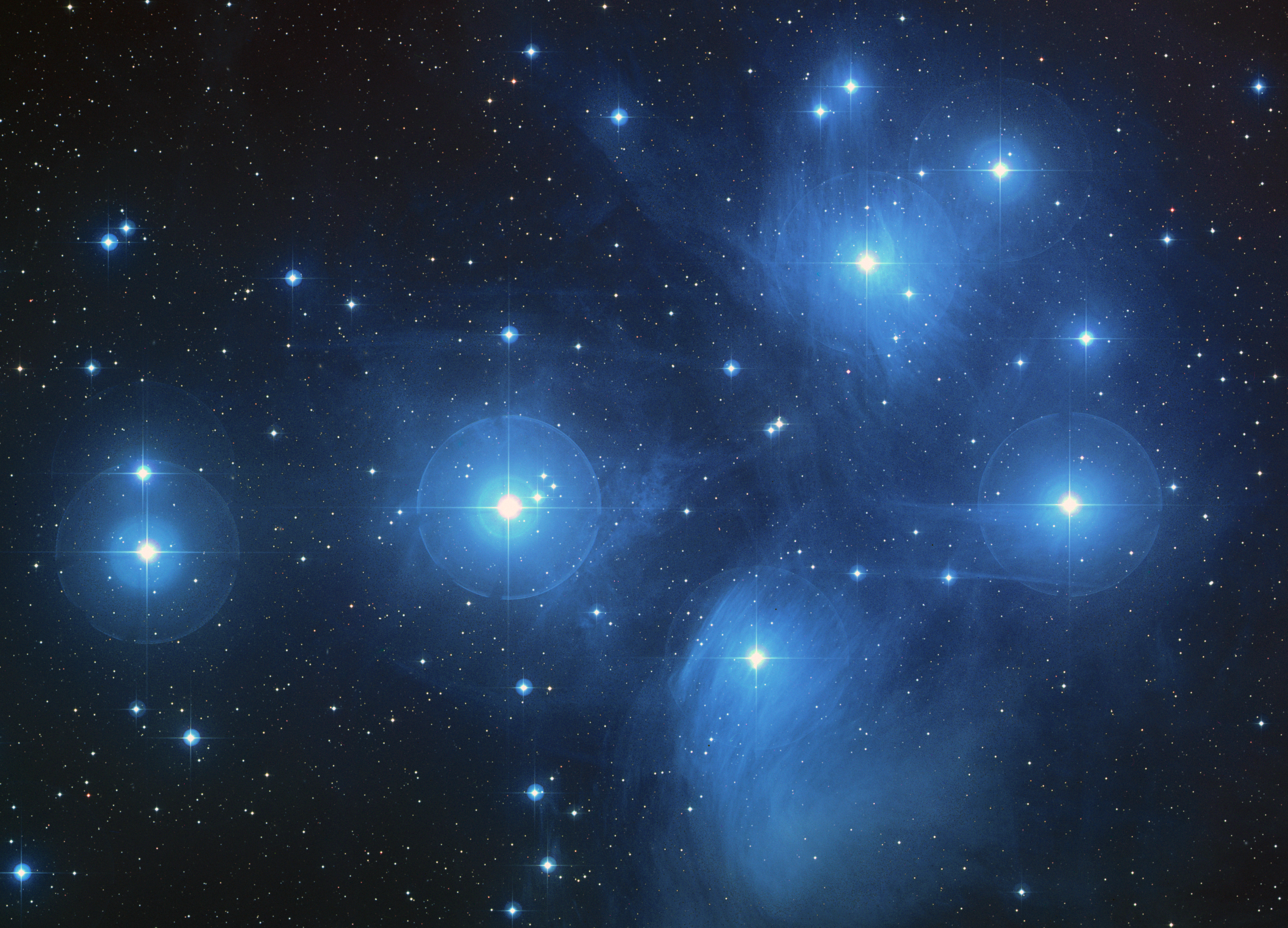
- 22 Tauri in the Pleiades cluster (circled), with 21 Tauri above and right

Observation data Epoch J2000 Equinox J2000
- Constellation: Taurus
- Right ascension: 03^{h} 46^{m} 02.90033^{s}
- Declination: +24° 31′ 40.4284″
- Apparent magnitude (V): 6.43

Characteristics
- Evolutionary stage: main sequence
- Spectral type: A0 Vn
- B−V color index: −0.020±0.006

Astrometry
Radial velocity (R_{v})	+6.9±1.3 km/s
Proper motion (μ)	RA: +19.582 mas/yr Dec.: −44.878 mas/yr
Parallax (π)	7.4231±0.0359 mas
Distance	439 ± 2 ly (134.7 ± 0.7 pc)
Absolute magnitude (M_{V})	1.00

Details
Radius	3.1 R_{☉}
Luminosity	63.6 L_{☉}
Surface gravity (log g)	4.209±0.113 cgs
Temperature	11,817±191 K
Metallicity [Fe/H]	−0.1 dex
Rotational velocity (v sin i)	232 km/s

Other designations
- Sterope II, 22 Tau, BD+24°556, GC 4506, HD 23441, HIP 17588, HR 1152, SAO 76164

Database references
SIMBAD	data

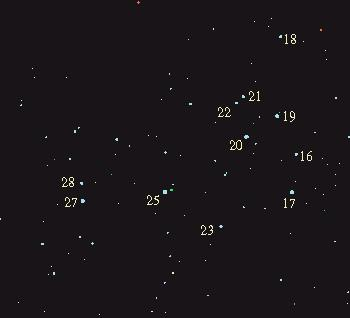
Flamsteed numbers for the brighter stars of the Pleiades

22 Tauri is a component of the Sterope double star in the Pleiades open cluster. 22 Tauri is the star's Flamsteed designation. It is situated near the ecliptic and thus is subject to lunar occultation. The star has an apparent visual magnitude of 6.43, which is near the lower threshold of visibility to the naked eye. Anybody attempting to view the object is likely to instead see the Sterope pair as a single elongated form of magnitude 5.6. Based upon an annual parallax shift of 7.42 mas, this star is located 439 light years away from the Sun. It is moving further from the Earth with a heliocentric radial velocity of +7 km/s.

This star traditionally shared the name Sterope or Asterope with 21 Tauri, and has sometimes been called Sterope II, but the IAU Working Group on Star Names officially approved the name Asterope for 21 Tauri.

This is an ordinary A-type main-sequence star with a stellar classification of A0 Vn. The 'n' suffix indicates the spectrum displays "nebulous" absorption lines due to rapid rotation. This is confirmed by a high projected rotational velocity of 232 km/s. The star is radiating sixty times the Sun's luminosity from its photosphere at an effective temperature of 11,817 K.
