= USS Sterope =

Cargo ship of the United States Navy

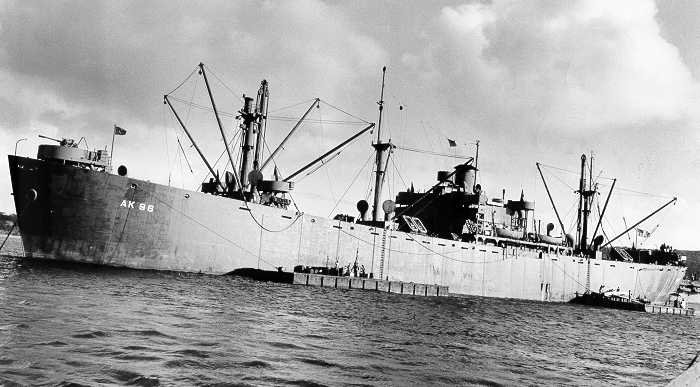
- USS Sterope (AK-96) unloading cargo onto pontoons at Guadalcanal, 1943

History

United States
- Name: James Wilson
- Namesake: James Wilson
- Owner: War Shipping Administration (WSA))
- Operator: American President Lines Ltd. (APL)
- Builder: Oregon Shipbuilding Corporation, Portland, Oregon
- Cost: $1,267,331
- Laid down: 9 December 1941
- Launched: 22 February 1942
- Completed: 11 April 1942
- Identification: Code letters: KERK
- Fate: Transferred to the US Navy, 27 March 1943

United States
- Name: James Wilson; Sterope
- Namesake: James Wilson; Asterope (star)
- Acquired: 27 March 1943
- Commissioned: 14 May 1943
- Decommissioned: 16 May 1946
- Refit: converted for Naval service by the Los Angeles Shipbuilding and Drydock Company
- Stricken: 19 November 1947
- Identification: Hull symbol: AK-96
- Fate: Sold for scrapping, 16 August 1963

General characteristics
- Class & type: Crater-class cargo ship
- Displacement: 4,023 long tons (4,088 t) (standard); 14,550 long tons (14,780 t) (full load)
- Length: 441 ft 6 in (134.57 m)
- Beam: 56 ft 11 in (17.35 m)
- Draft: 28 ft 4 in (8.64 m)
- Installed power: 2 × Oil fired 450 °F (232 °C) boilers, operating at 220 psi (1,500 kPa) , (manufactured by Combustion Engineering); 2,500 shp (1,900 kW)
- Propulsion: 1 × Vertical triple-expansion reciprocating steam engine, (manufactured by General Machinery Corp., Hamilton, Ohio); 1 × screw propeller
- Speed: 12.5 kn (23.2 km/h; 14.4 mph)
- Complement: 207
- Armament: 1 × 5 in (127 mm)/38 caliber dual-purpose (DP) gun; 1 × 3 in (76 mm)/50 caliber DP gun; 2 × 40 mm (1.57 in) Bofors anti-aircraft (AA) gun mounts; 6 × 20 mm (0.79 in) Oerlikon cannon AA gun mounts

USS Sterope (AK-96) was a Crater-class cargo ship commissioned by the U.S. Navy for service in World War II. She was responsible for delivering troops, goods and equipment to locations in the war zone.

== Construction ==
Originally named SS James Wilson (MC hull 183) after Founding Father James Wilson, she was laid down on 9 December 1941, by the Oregon Shipbuilding Co., Portland, Oregon; launched on 22 February 1942; sponsored by Mrs. John Spady; acquired by the Navy on 27 March 1943; and commissioned on 14 May 1943.

== World War II Pacific Theatre operations ==
Sterope was converted to Navy specifications by the Los Angeles Shipbuilding and Drydock Co., and completed her shakedown cruise on 10 June. The ship --- assigned to the Naval Transportation Service ---proceeded to San Francisco, California, loaded, and sailed on 24 June for New Caledonia. Sterope arrived at Noumea on 16 July 1943 and, for the next two years, shuttled supplies to advanced bases as a part of the Service Force, Pacific Fleet.

Highlights of her service came in July 1944, when she delivered supplies to American forces engaged in recapturing Guam and in May 1945 when she took supplies to troops fighting for Okinawa.

== End-of-war operations ==
Late in July 1945, Sterope headed for Pearl Harbor and the U.S. west coast. She reached San Francisco on 6 August and was undergoing overhaul there when the war ended. On 9 October 1945, the ship sailed for Guam and moved varied cargo among the islands of the Central Pacific for the next six months.

== Post-war decommissioning ==
Sterope arrived at Pearl Harbor on 18 April 1946 and was decommissioned there on 16 May. In August 1947, she was towed to San Francisco and returned to the Maritime Commission. Her name was struck from the Navy list on 19 November 1947.

== Military awards and honors ==
Sterope received two battle stars for World War II service. Her crew was eligible for the following medals:

- American Campaign Medal
- Asiatic-Pacific Campaign Medal (2)
- World War II Victory Medal

== Bibliography ==
- "Sterope". Dictionary of American Naval Fighting Ships. Naval History and Heritage Command. This article incorporates text from this source, which is in the public domain.
- "USS Sterope (AK-96)". NavSource.
- "James Wilson". United States Department of Transportation. Archived from the original on 4 November 2016.
- "SS James Wilson". usmaritimecommission.de.
