= Celaeno (star) =

Star in the Taurus constellation

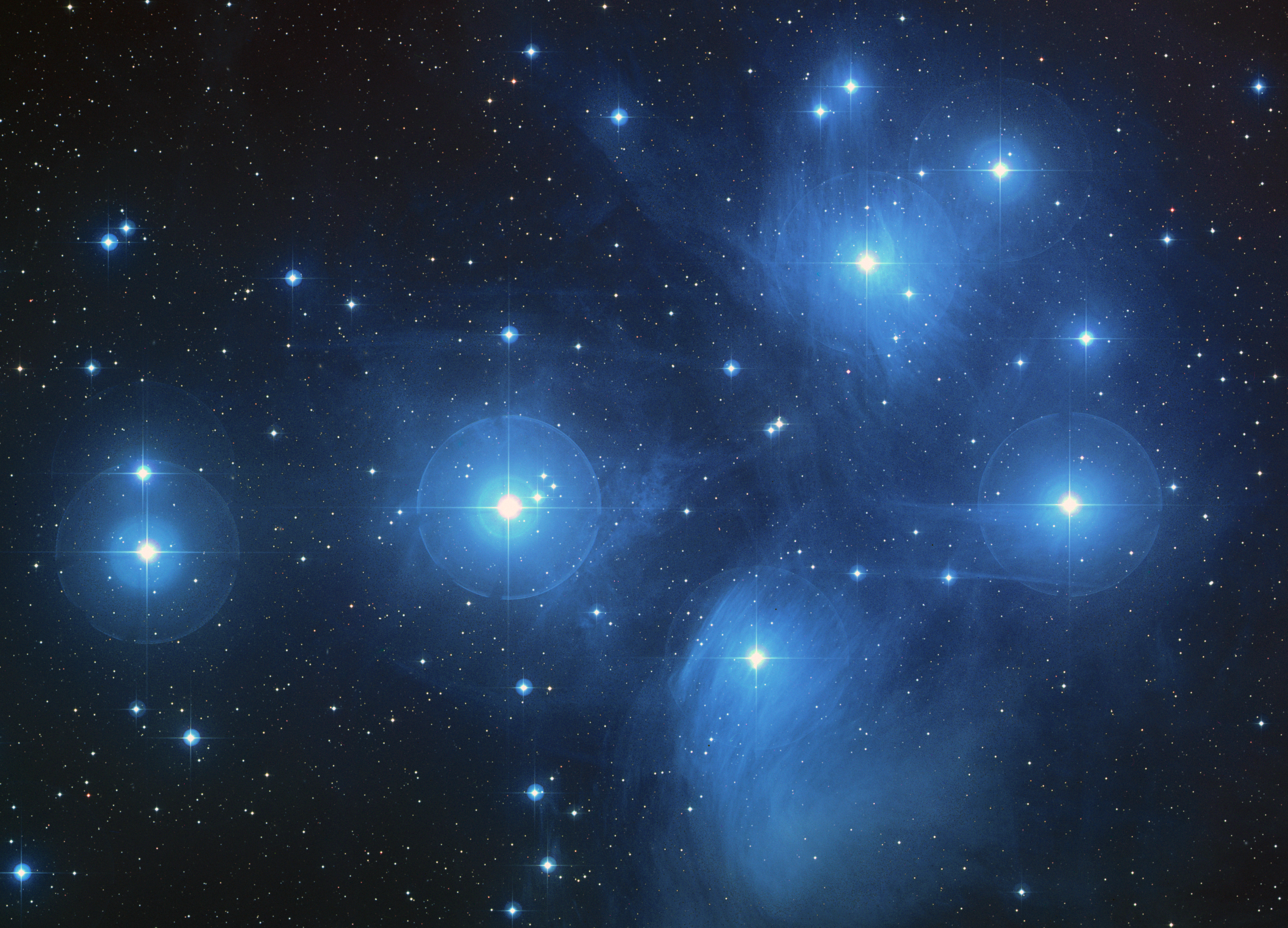
- Celaeno in the Pleiades cluster (circled)

Observation data Epoch J2000 Equinox ICRS
- Constellation: Taurus
- Right ascension: 03^{h} 44^{m} 48.2149^{s}
- Declination: +24° 17′ 22.083″
- Apparent magnitude (V): +5.45

Characteristics
- Evolutionary stage: main sequence
- Spectral type: B7V
- U−B color index: –0.33
- B−V color index: –0.046

Astrometry
Radial velocity (R_{v})	+2.9 km/s
Proper motion (μ)	RA: +19.849 mas/yr Dec.: –44.966 mas/yr
Parallax (π)	7.3852±0.0724 mas
Distance	442 ± 4 ly (135 ± 1 pc)
Absolute magnitude (M_{V})	−0.76

Details
Mass	4.0 M_{☉}
Radius	2.34 R_{☉}
Luminosity	344 L_{☉}
Surface gravity (log g)	3.9 cgs
Temperature	12,800 K
Metallicity [Fe/H]	−0.05 dex
Rotational velocity (v sin i)	212 km/s
Age	122 Myr

Other designations
- Celaeno, Celeno, 16 Tau, BD+23 505, GC 4475, HD 23288, HIP 17489, HR 1140, SAO 76126

Database references
SIMBAD	data

Celaeno (/səˈliːnoʊ/), designated 16 Tauri, is a star in the constellation of Taurus and a member of the Pleiades open star cluster (M45) of stars.

== Properties ==
16 Tauri is a blue-white B-type subgiant with an apparent magnitude of +5.45. It is approximately 430 light years from the Sun; about the same distance as the Pleiades. The interstellar extinction of this star is fairly small at 0.05 magnitudes. The projected rotational velocity of the equator is 185 km/s. It is 3.4 times the radius of the Sun and has a surface temperature of 12,800 K.

== Nomenclature ==
16 Tauri is the star's Flamsteed designation.

It bore the traditional named Celaeno (or Celeno) and was called the "Lost Pleiad" by Theon the Younger. Celaeno was one of the Pleiades sisters in Greek mythology. In 2016, the International Astronomical Union organized a Working Group on Star Names (WGSN) to catalogue and standardize proper names for stars. The WGSN approved the name Celaeno for this star on 21 August 2016 and it is now so entered in the IAU Catalog of Star Names.

=== Namesake ===
USS Celeno (AK-76) was a United States Navy Crater class cargo ship named after the star.
