= Taygeta =

Double star system in the constellation Taurus

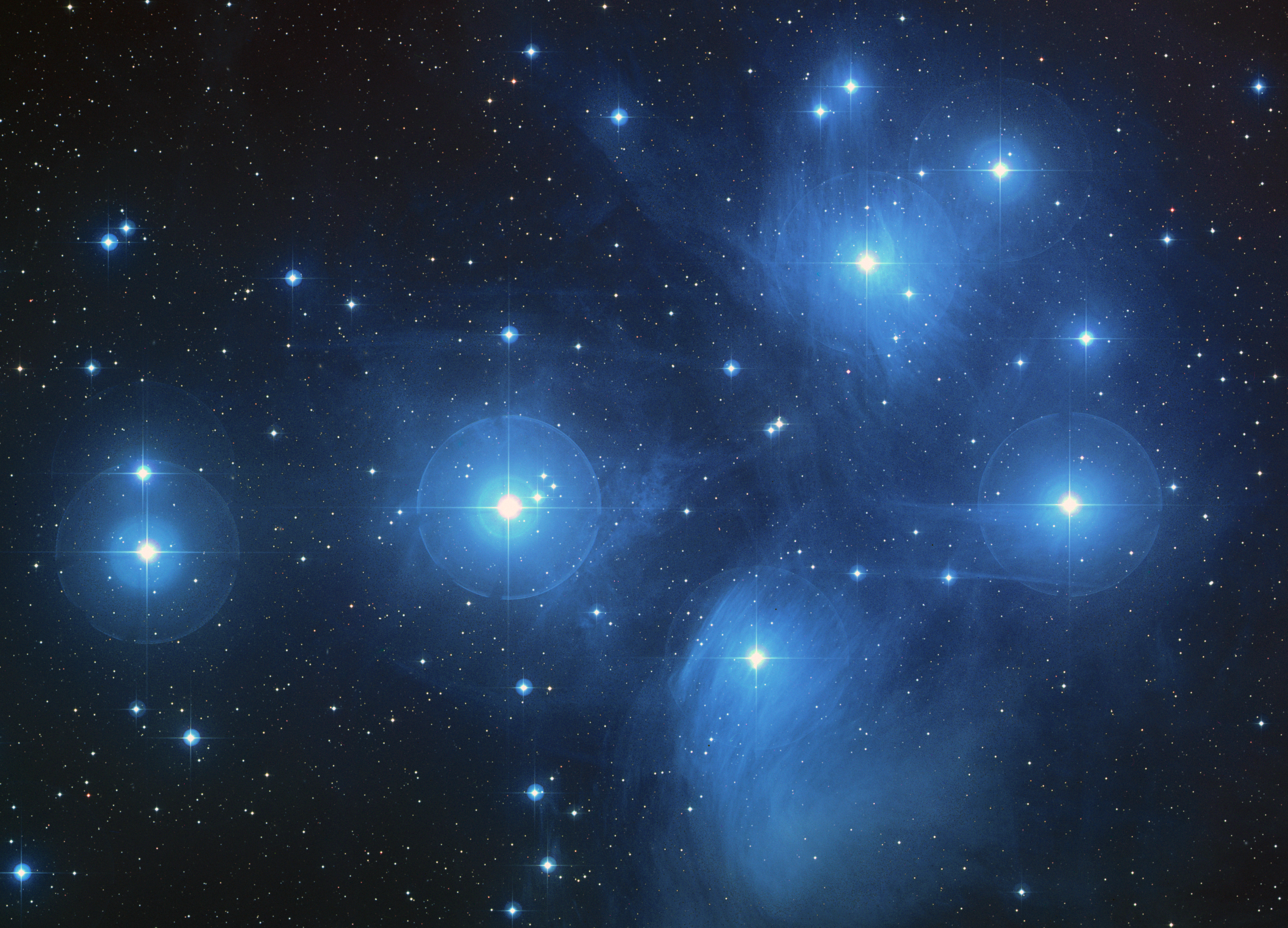
- Taygeta in the Pleiades cluster (circled)

Observation data Epoch J2000.0 Equinox ICRS
- Constellation: Taurus
- Right ascension: 03^{h} 45^{m} 12.49578^{s}
- Declination: +24° 28′ 02.2097″
- Apparent magnitude (V): 4.30

Characteristics
- Evolutionary stage: main sequence
- Spectral type: B6IV + ?
- U−B color index: −0.48
- B−V color index: −0.12

Astrometry
Radial velocity (R_{v})	10.1 km/s
Proper motion (μ)	RA: +21.24±0.38 mas/yr Dec.: −40.56±0.35 mas/yr
Parallax (π)	7.97±0.33 mas
Distance	410 ± 20 ly (125 ± 5 pc)

Details

Taygeta
Mass	4.41±0.09 M_{☉}
Radius	4.36±0.14 R_{☉}
Luminosity	600 L_{☉}
Surface gravity (log g)	3.772±0.113 cgs
Temperature	13,696±222 K
Rotational velocity (v sin i)	105±16 km/s

19 Tauri Ab
Mass	3.2 M_{☉}
Luminosity	150 L_{☉}
Surface gravity (log g)	4.2 cgs
Temperature	8,306 K

Other designations
- q Tauri, 19 Tauri, BD+24°547, GC 4486, HD 23338, HIP 17531, HR 1145, SAO 76140, CCDM J03452+2429A

Database references
SIMBAD	data

Taygeta is a double star in the constellation of Taurus and a member of the Pleiades open star cluster (M45).

It consists of a binary pair designated 19 Tauri A together with a single-star visual companion, 19 Tauri B. A's two components are themselves designated 19 Tauri Aa (officially named Taygeta /teɪˈɪdʒətə/, the traditional name for the entire system) and Ab.

Based on parallax measurements obtained during the Hipparcos mission, Taygeta is approximately 410 light-years from the Sun.

== Nomenclature ==
19 Tauri is the system's Flamsteed designation. It also bears the little-used Bayer designation q Tauri. The designations of the two constituents as 19 Tauri A and B, and those of A's components—19 Tauri Aa and Ab—derive from the convention used by the Washington Multiplicity Catalog (WMC) for multiple star systems, and adopted by the International Astronomical Union (IAU).

The system bore the traditional name Taygeta (or Taygete). Taygete was one of the Pleiades sisters in Greek mythology. In 2016, the IAU organized a Working Group on Star Names (WGSN) to catalogue and standardize proper names for stars. The WGSN approved the name Taygeta for the component 19 Tauri Aa on 21 August 2016 and it is now so included in the List of IAU-approved Star Names.

== Properties ==
Taygeta has an apparent magnitude of +4.30 and presents as a blue-white B-type subgiant. It has been used as a standard star for that spectral type. It is a spectroscopic binary, whose component stars have magnitudes of +4.6 and +6.1. They are separated by 0.012 arcseconds and complete one orbit every 1,313 days. The subgiant primary is one of just a handful of stars in the young Pleiades cluster that have evolved away from the main sequence.

The 8th-magnitude visual companion, 19 Tauri B, is 69 arcseconds away. It is thought to be a yellow star somewhat more massive and larger than the Sun, and further away than the Pleiades cluster.

Taygeta was once reported to be variable, but has since been measured to be very nearly constant.

== In UFO and extraterrestrial-contact literature ==
The name Taygeta has also been associated in some modern UFO and extraterrestrial-contact literature with claimed beings referred to as Taygetans or Taygetan Pleiadians. In Swaruu-related material, these beings are described as tall and human-like, with reported variation in hair and eye colour.

Descriptions within this literature include blue or green eyes and varying hair colours. Some accounts describe dark-haired individuals, while other descriptions use blond or reddish-blond hair.

Female Taygetans are portrayed in this literature as tall, human-looking women. Artistic interpretations vary, with some emphasizing long dark hair and striking blue eyes and presenting an idealized feminine appearance.

These descriptions belong to modern extraterrestrial-contact narratives and are not established astronomical observations. The astronomical star Taygeta described in this article is distinct from the claimed Taygetan beings described in such literature.
