= Asterope (star) =

Star in the constellation Taurus

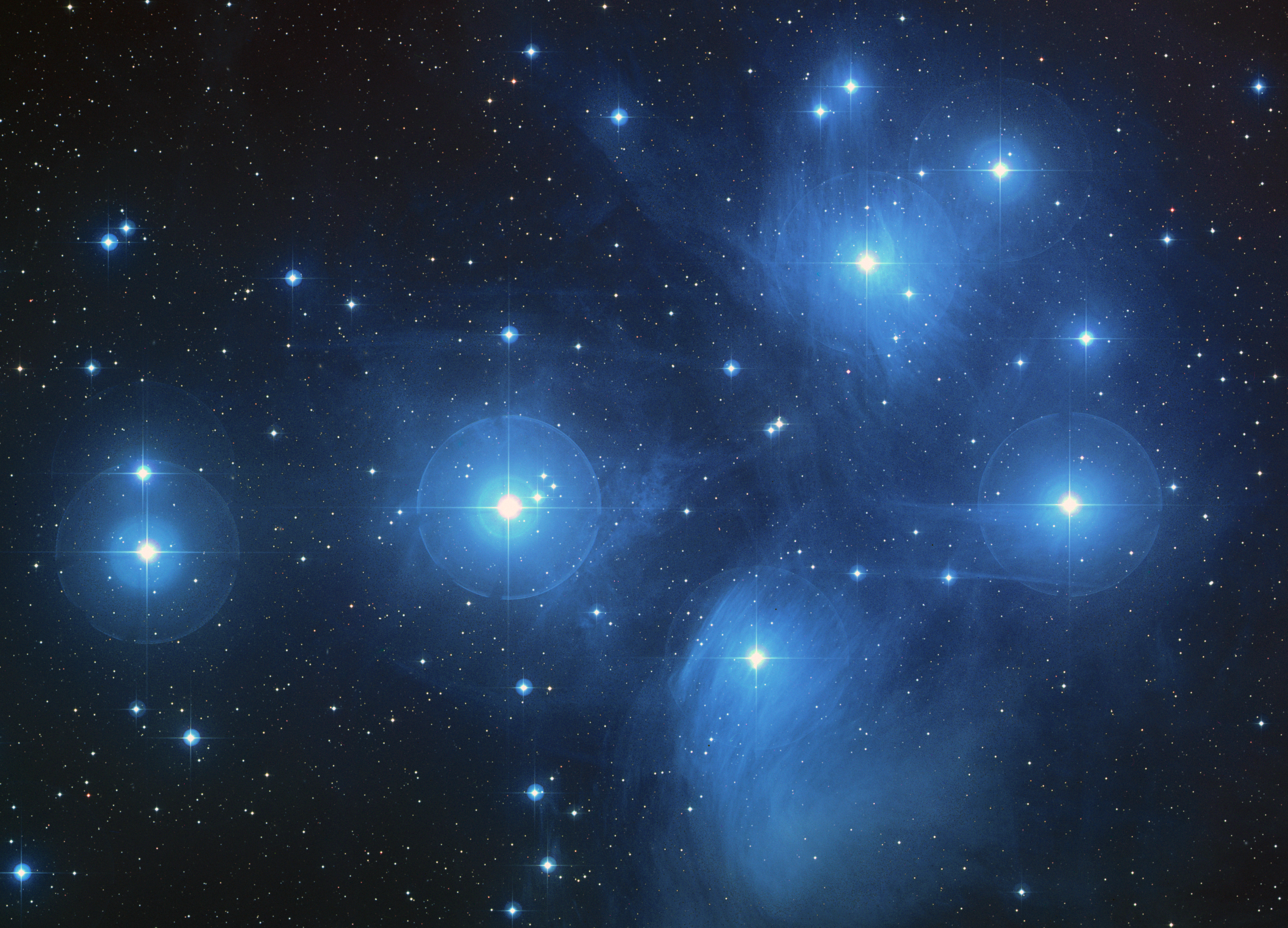
- Asterope in the Pleiades cluster (circled), with 22 Tauri below and left

Observation data Epoch J2000 Equinox ICRS
- Constellation: Taurus
- Right ascension: 03^{h} 45^{m} 54.47676^{s}
- Declination: +24° 33′ 16.2418″
- Apparent magnitude (V): 5.76

Characteristics
- Evolutionary stage: main sequence
- Spectral type: B8 V
- B−V color index: +0.04

Astrometry
Radial velocity (R_{v})	+6.0±0.6 km/s
Proper motion (μ)	RA: +20.025 mas/yr Dec.: −45.949 mas/yr
Parallax (π)	7.5658±0.1321 mas
Distance	431 ± 8 ly (132 ± 2 pc)
Absolute magnitude (M_{V})	+0.34

Details
Mass	2.93±0.07 M_{☉}
Luminosity	100+15 −13 L_{☉}
Surface gravity (log g)	4.250±0.113 cgs
Temperature	11,041±76 K
Rotational velocity (v sin i)	159 km/s
Age	100 Myr

Other designations
- Asterope, Sterope I, 21 Tau, BD+24°553, GC 4502, HD 23432, HIP 17579, HR 1151, SAO 76159

Database references
SIMBAD	data

Asterope /əˈstɛrəpi/ designated 21 Tauri, is a component of the Sterope double star in the Pleiades open cluster. 21 Tauri is the star's Flamsteed designation. This star is potentially faintly visible to the naked eye with an apparent visual magnitude of 5.76 in ideal conditions, although anybody viewing the object is likely to instead see the pair as a single elongated form of magnitude 5.6. The distance to Asterope can be estimated from its annual parallax shift of 7.6 mas, yielding a range of around 431 light years. It is moving further from the Earth with a heliocentric radial velocity of +6 km/s.

Asterope was one of the Pleiades sisters in Greek mythology. This star traditionally shared the name Sterope or Asterope with 22 Tauri, and was sometimes called Sterope I. In 2016, the International Astronomical Union organized a Working Group on Star Names (WGSN) to catalogue and standardize proper names for stars. The WGSN decided to attribute proper names to individual stars rather than entire multiple systems. It approved the name Asterope for 21 Tauri on 21 August 2016 and it is now so included in the List of IAU-approved Star Names.

Asterope is a blue-white hued B-type main sequence star with a stellar classification of B8 V. It is a single star with around three times the mass of the Sun and is 100 million years old. The star is radiating 100 times the Sun's luminosity from its photosphere at an effective temperature of 11,041 K. It displays an infrared excess, but this is due to reflection nebula rather than a circumstellar disk.
