= List of Chinese star names =

Chinese star names (Chinese: 星名, xīng míng) are named according to ancient Chinese astronomy and astrology. The sky is divided into star mansions (星宿, xīng xiù, also translated as "lodges") and asterisms (星官, xīng guān). The ecliptic is divided into four sectors that are associated with the Four Symbols, guardians in Chinese mythology, and further into 28 mansions. Stars around the north celestial pole are grouped into three enclosures (垣, yuán). The system of 283 asterisms under the Three Enclosures and Twenty-Eight Mansions was established by Chen Zhuo of the Three Kingdoms period, who synthesized ancient constellations and the asterisms created by early astronomers Shi Shen, Gan De and Wuxian. Since the Han and Jin dynasties, stars have been given reference numbers within their asterisms in a system similar to the Bayer or Flamsteed designations, so that individual stars can be identified. For example, Deneb (α Cyg) is referred to as 天津四 (Tiān Jīn Sì, the Fourth Star of Celestial Ford).

In the Qing dynasty, Chinese knowledge of the sky was improved by the arrival of European star charts. Yixiang Kaocheng, compiled in mid-18th century by then deputy Minister of Rites Ignaz Kögler, expanded the star catalogue to more than 3000 stars. The newly added stars (增星, zēng xīng) were named as 增一 (zēng yī, 1st added star), 增二 (zēng èr, 2nd added star) etc. For example, γ Cephei is referred to as 少衛增八 (Shào Wèi Zēng Bā, 8th Added Star of Second Imperial Guard). Some stars may have been assigned more than one name due to the inaccuracies of traditional star charts.

While there is little disagreement on the correspondence between traditional Chinese and Western star names for brighter stars, many asterisms, in particular those originally from Gan De, were created primarily for astrological purposes and can only be mapped to very dim stars. The first attempt to fully map the Chinese constellations was made by Paul Tsuchihashi in late 19th century. In 1981, based on Yixiang Kaocheng and Yixiang Kaocheng Xubian, the first complete map of Chinese stars and constellations was published by Yi Shitong (伊世同).

The list is based on Atlas Comparing Chinese and Western Star Maps and Catalogues by Yi Shitong (1981) and Star Charts in Ancient China by Chen Meidong (1996). In a few cases, meanings of the names are vague due to their antiquity. In this article, the translation by Hong Kong Space Museum is used.

== Three Enclosures ==
=== Purple Forbidden Enclosure ===
The Purple Forbidden Enclosure (紫微垣 Zǐ Wēi Yuán) occupies the region around the north celestial pole and represents the imperial palace. It corresponds to constellations Auriga, Boötes, Camelopardalis, Canes Venatici, Cassiopeia, Cepheus, Draco, Hercules, Leo Minor, Lynx, Ursa Major, and Ursa Minor.

Asterism	1	2	3	4	5	6	7	8	9	Note
北極 (Běi Jí, North Pole)	太子 (Tài Zǐ, Crown Prince) γ UMi (Pherkad)	帝 (Dì, Emperor) β UMi (Kochab)	庶子 (Shù Zǐ, Son of Concubine); 5 UMi	後宮 (Hòu Gōng, Imperial Harem); 4 UMi	天樞 (Tiān Shū, Celestial Pivot); HIP 62561					
四輔 (Sì Fǔ, Four Advisors)	Unclear	HIP 51384	HIP 51502	Unclear						
勾陳 (Gōu Chén, Curved Array)	α UMi (Polaris)	δ UMi (Yildun)	ε UMi	ζ UMi (Akhfa al Farkadain)	2 UMi (Tarandus)	HIP 113116				
天皇大帝 (Tiān Huáng Dà Dì, Great Emperor of Heaven)	HIP 109693 (Note: Polaris is another possible identity of this star. For example, in Song dynasty Taoist text Shangqing Dingbao Dafa: "A bright star located right in the middle [of Gōu Chén] is Tiān Huáng Dà Dì." (其下一大星，正居其中，是為天皇大帝也。 Shangqing Lingbao Dafa Volume 4))									
天柱 (Tiān Zhù, Celestial Pillars)	76 Dra	77 Dra	69 Dra	59 Dra	40 Dra					
御女 (Yù Nǚ, Maids-in-waiting)	τ Dra	50 Dra	29 Dra	χ Dra						
女史 (Nǚ Shǐ, Female Protocol)	ψ1 Dra (Dziban)									
柱史 (Zhù Shǐ, Official of Royal Archives)	φ Dra									
尚書 (Shàng Shū, Royal Secretary)	27 Dra	15 Dra	18 Dra	HIP 80161	19 Dra					
天床 (Tiān Chuáng, Celestial Bed)	HIP 69373	HIP 74605	HIP 77277	HIP 79414	RR UMi	6 UMi				
大理 (Dà Lǐ, Chief Judge)	CO Cam	Unclear								
陰德 (Yīn Dé, Hidden Virtue)	HIP 51808	HD 91114								
六甲 (Liù Jiǎ, Six Jia)	HIP 32439	HD 49878 (Tonglingxing)	HIP 39538	VZ Cam	HIP 23265	K Cam				
五帝內座 (Wǔ Dì Nèi Zuò, Interior Seats of Five Emperors)	HIP 14417	47 Cas	HIP 13055	HIP 15547	HIP 19461					
華蓋 (Huá Gài, Canopy of the Emperor)	Unclear	40 Cas	HIP 5926	31 Cas	ψ Cas	43 Cas	ω Cas			
槓 (Gàng, Canopy Support)	γ Cam (Shaowei)	HIP 14862 (Shangcheng)	49 Cas (Rangifer)	51 Cas	50 Cas (Gang)	54 Cas	48 Cas	42 Cas	38 Cas	
紫微右垣 (Zǐ Wēi Yòu Yuán, Right Wall)	右樞 (Yòu Shū, Right Pivot) α Dra (Thuban)	少尉 (Shào Wèi, Second Chief Judge) κ Dra	上輔 (Shàng Fǔ, First Minister) λ Dra (Giausar)	少輔 (Shào Fǔ, Second Minister); 24 UMa	上衛 (Shàng Wèi, First Imperial Guard); 43 Cam	少衛 (Shào Wèi, Second Imperial Guard) α Cam	上丞 (Shàng Chéng, First Prime Minister); BK Cam			
紫微左垣 (Zǐ Wēi Zuǒ Yuán, Left Wall)	左樞 (Zuǒ Shū, Left Pivot) ι Dra (Edasich)	上宰 (Shàng Zǎi, First Premier) θ Dra	少宰 (Shào Zǎi, Second Premier) η Dra (Athebyne)	上弼 (Shàng Bì, First Minister) ζ Dra (Aldhibah)	少弼 (Shào Bì, Second Minister) υ Dra	上衛 (Shàng Wèi, First Imperial Guard); 73 Dra	少衛 (Shào Wèi, Second Imperial Guard) π Cep	少丞 (Shào Chéng, Second Prime Minister); 23 Cas		
天乙 (Tiān Yǐ, Celestial Great One)	7 Dra (Tianyi)									
太乙 (Tài Yǐ, First Great One)	8 Dra (Taiyi)									
內廚 (Nèi Chú, Inner Kitchen)	10 Dra	HIP 66798								
北斗 (Běi Dǒu, Northern Dipper)	天樞 (Tiān Shū, Celestial Pivot) α UMa (Dubhe)	天璇 (Tiān Xuán, Celestial Rotating Jade) β UMa (Merak)	天璣 (Tiān Jī, Celestial Shining Pearl) γ UMa (Phecda)	天權 (Tiān Quán, Celestial Balance) δ UMa (Megrez)	玉衡 (Yù Héng, Jade Sighting-tube) ε UMa (Alioth)	開陽 (Kāi Yáng, Opener of Heat) ζ UMa (Mizar)	搖光 (Yáo Guāng, Twinkling Brilliance) η UMa (Alkaid)			
輔 (Fǔ, Assistant)	80 UMa (Alcor)									
天槍 (Tiān Qiāng, Celestial Spear)	κ Boo (Asellus Tertius)	ι Boo (Asellus Secundus)	θ Boo (Asellus Primus)							
玄戈 (Xuán Gē, Sombre Lance)	λ Boo (Xuange)									
三公 (Sān Gōng, Three Excellencies)	Unclear	24 CVn	21 CVn							
相 (Xiàng, Prime Minister)	5 CVn									
天理 (Tiān Lǐ, Judge for Nobility)	HIP 55060	HIP 55797	66 UMa	HIP 58259						
太陽守 (Tài Yáng Shǒu, Guard of the Sun)	χ UMa (Taiyangshou)									
太尊 (Tài Zūn, Royals)	ψ UMa									
天牢 (Tiān Láo, Celestial Prison)	ω UMa	57 UMa	47 UMa (Chalawan)	58 UMa	49 UMa	56 UMa				
勢 (Shì, Eunuch)	34 LMi	33 LMi	42 LMi	46 LMi (Praecipua)						
文昌 (Wén Chāng, Administrative Centre)	υ UMa	Unclear	φ UMa	θ UMa	15 UMa	18 UMa				
內階 (Nèi Jiē, Inner Steps)	ο UMa (Muscida)	c UMa	6 UMa	23 UMa	b UMa	17 UMa				
三師 (Sān Shī, Three Top Instructors)	ρ UMa	Unclear	σ2 UMa							
八穀 (Bā Gǔ, Eight Kinds of Crops)	δ Aur (Bagu)	ξ Aur	26 Cam	14 Cam	7 Cam	9 Aur	11 Cam	31 Cam		
傳舍 (Chuán Shè, Guest House)	HIP 117371	16 Cas	32 Cas	32 Cas	55 Cas	HIP 13665	CS Cam	CE Cam	D Cam	
天廚 (Tiān Chú, Celestial Kitchen)	δ Dra (Altais)	σ Dra (Alsafi)	ε Dra (Tyl)	ρ Dra	64 Dra	π Dra				
天棓 (Tiān Bàng, Celestial Flail)	ξ Dra (Grumium)	ν2 Dra (Kuma)	β Dra (Rastaban)	γ Dra (Eltanin)	ι Her (Tianbang)					

Added Stars

Asterism	+1	+2	+3	+4	+5	+6	+7	+8	+9	+10	+11	+12	+13	+14	+15	+16	+17	+18	+19	+20	+21	+22	+23	+24	+25	+26	+27	+28	+29	+30	+31	+32	+33	+34	Note
庶子 (Shù Zǐ, Son of Concubine)	Unclear	3 UMi	10 UMi																																
後宮 (Hòu Gōng, Imperial Harem)	Unclear																																		
四輔 (Sì Fǔ, Four Advisors)	HIP 47193																																		
勾陳 (Gōu Chén, Curved Array)	HIP 112519	HIP 115746	Unclear	OV Cep	λ UMi	24 UMi	θ UMi	19 UMi	η UMi (Anwar al Farkadain)	20 UMi																									
天柱 (Tiān Zhù, Celestial Pillars)	59 Dra	κ Cep	74 Dra	75 Dra	41 Dra	35 Dra																													
御女 (Yù Nǚ, Maids-in-waiting)	Unclear																																		
女史 (Nǚ Shǐ, Female Protocol)	ψ2 Dra																																		
柱史 (Zhù Shǐ, Official of Royal Archives)	38 Dra	37 Dra																																	
尚書 (Shàng Shū, Royal Secretary)	ω Dra	20 Dra																																	
天床 (Tiān Chuáng, Celestial Bed)	9 UMi	11 UMi (Pherkad Minor)																																	
大理 (Dà Lǐ, Chief Judge)	HIP 60044	HD 104985																																	
陰德 (Yīn Dé, Hidden Virtue)	HIP 51808																																		
六甲 (Liù Jiǎ, Six Jia)	BN Cam																																		
五帝內座 (Wǔ Dì Nèi Zuò, Interior Seats of Five Emperors)	47 Cas	HD 6798	HD 7238																																
槓 (Gàng, Canopy Support)	HIP 12273																																		
少尉 (Shào Wèi, Second Chief Judge)	6 Dra	4 Dra																																	
上輔 (Shàng Fǔ, First Minister)	2 Dra	3 Dra																																	
少輔 (Shào Fǔ, Second Minister)	27 UMa																																		
上衛 (Shàng Wèi, Right Wall First Imperial Guard)	36 Cam	L Cam	42 Cam																																
少衛 (Shào Wèi, Right Wall Second Imperial Guard)	HIP 20266																																		
上丞 (Shàng Chéng, First Prime Minister)	BE Cam (Custos)	HIP 17587	H Cam																																
上衛 (Shàng Wèi, Left Wall First Imperial Guard)	β Cep (Alfirk)	11 Cep	78 Dra																																
少衛 (Shào Wèi, Left Wall Second Imperial Guard)	79 Dra	16 Cep	24 Cep	HIP 109434	31 Cep	31 Cep	ρ Cep	γ Cep (Errai)																											
內廚 (Nèi Chú, Inner Kitchen)	9 Dra	76 UMa																																	
天樞 (Tiān Shū, Celestial Pivot)	32 UMa	35 UMa	38 UMa																																
天璇 (Tiān Xuán, Celestial Rotating Jade)	36 UMa	37 UMa	42 UMa	41 UMa	39 UMa	40 UMa	43 UMa	44 UMa																											
天權 (Tiān Quán, Celestial Balance)	74 UMa	70 UMa	73 UMa																																
開陽 (Kāi Yáng, Opener of Heat)	80 UMa (Alcor)	82 UMa																																	
輔 (Fǔ, Assistant)	83 UMa	84 UMa	86 UMa																																
天槍 (Tiān Qiāng, Celestial Spear)	13 Boo	24 Boo	39 Boo	44 Boo (Quadrans)																															
玄戈 (Xuán Gē, Sombre Lance)	33 Boo	38 Boo (Merga)																																	
相 (Xiàng, Prime Minister)	1 CVn	3 CVn	11 CVn																																
天理 (Tiān Lǐ, Judge for Nobility)	HIP 56035																																		
太陽守 (Tài Yáng Shǒu, Guard of the Sun)	60 UMa																																		
天牢 (Tiān Láo, Celestial Prison)	59 UMa	55 UMa																																	
勢 (Shì, Eunuch)	35 LMi	38 LMi	32 LMi	β LMi	29 LMi	26 LMi	27 LMi	28 LMi	30 LMi	36 LMi	37 LMi	47 LMi	46 UMa	43 LMi	44 LMi	44 LMi	27 LMi	28 LMi	30 LMi																
文昌 (Wén Chāng, Administrative Centre)	28 UMa	HIP 47965	21 UMa	26 UMa	37 Lyn	39 Lyn	31 UMa	Unclear																											
內階 (Nèi Jiē, Inner Steps)	19 Lyn	18 Lyn	24 Lyn	30 Lyn	29 Lyn	Unclear	π2 UMa	2 UMa	π1 UMa	τ UMa																									
三師 (Sān Shī, Three Top Instructors)	σ1 UMa																																		
八穀 (Bā Gǔ, Eight Kinds of Crops)	4 Cam	6 Cam	5 Cam	9 Aur	HIP 28385	ξ Aur	29 Cam	28 Cam	24 Cam	18 Cam	16 Cam	15 Cam	12 Cam	β Cam	19 Cam	21 Cam	23 Cam	30 Cam	37 Cam	40 Cam	1 Lyn	3 Lyn	8 Lyn	10 Lyn	4 Lyn	2 Lyn	5 Lyn	6 Lyn	14 Lyn	15 Lyn	13 Lyn	11 Lyn	9 Lyn	45 Aur	
傳舍 (Chuán Shè, Guest House)	13 Cas	HIP 18488	HIP 19968	HIP 19018																															
天廚 (Tiān Chú, Celestial Kitchen)	55 Dra	65 Dra																																	
天棓 (Tiān Bàng, Celestial Flail)	ν1 Dra (Kuma)	30 Dra	88 Her	82 Her	ν2 Dra (Alawaidh)	ν1 Dra (Kuma)	74 Her	77 Her	μ Dra (Alrakis)	26 Dra																									

=== Supreme Palace Enclosure ===
The Supreme Palace Enclosure (太微垣, Tài Wēi Yuán) represents the imperial court. It corresponds to constellations Canes Venatici, Coma Berenices, Leo, Leo Minor, Lynx, Sextans, Ursa Major and Virgo.

Asterism	1	2	3	4	5	6	7	8	9	10	11	12	13	14	15	Note
五帝座 (Wǔ Dì Zuò, Thrones of the Five Emperors)	β Leo (Denebola)	HIP 57646	HIP 57320	95 Leo	HIP 57779											
太子 (Tài Zǐ, Crown Prince)	93 Leo															
從官 (Cóng Guān, Retinue)	92 Leo															
幸臣 (Xìng Chén, Officer of Honour)	GK Com															
五諸侯 (Wǔ Zhū Hóu, Five Feudal Kings)	39 Com	GK Com	27 Com	Unclear	6 Com											
九卿 (Jiǔ Qīng, Nine Ministers)	ρ Vir	d2 Vir	HIP 61579													
三公 (Sān Gōng, Three Excellencies)	Unclear	d1 Vir	35 Vir													
內屏 (Nèi Píng, Inner Screen)	ξ Vir	ν Vir	π Vir	ο Vir												
太微右垣 (Tài Wēi Yòu Yuán, Right Wall)	右執法 (Yòu Zhí Fǎ, Right Law Administrator) β Vir (Zavijava)	西上將 (Xī Shàng Jiàng, First Western General) σ Leo	西次將 (Xī Cì Jiàng, Second Western General) ι Leo	西上相 (Xī Shàng Xiàng, First Western Minister) θ Leo (Chertan)	西次相 (Xī Cì Xiàng, Second Western Minister) δ Leo (Zosma)											
太微左垣 (Tài Wēi Zuǒ Yuán, Left Wall)	左執法 (Zuǒ Zhí Fǎ, Left Law Administrator) η Vir (Zaniah)	東上將 (Dōng Shàng Jiàng, First Eastern General) γ Vir (Porrima)	東次將 (Dōng Cì Jiàng, Second Eastern General) δ Vir (Minelauva)	東上相 (Dōng Shàng Xiàng, First Eastern Minister) ε Vir (Vindemiatrix)	東次相 (Dōng Cì Xiàng, Second Eastern Minister) α Com (Diadem)											
郎將 (Láng Jiàng, Captain of the Bodyguards)	31 Com															
郎位 (Láng Wèi, Officers of the Imperial Guard)	γ Com	Unclear	14 Com	16 Com	17 Com	13 Com	12 Com	21 Com	18 Com	7 Com	23 Com (Phyllon Kissinou)	26 Com	20 Com	5 Com	2 Com	
常陳 (Cháng Chén, Imperial Guards)	α CVn (Cor Caroli)	10 CVn	9 CVn	β CVn (Chara)	6 CVn	2 CVn	67 UMa									
上台 (Shàng Tái, Upper Step)	ι UMa (Talitha)	κ UMa (Alkaphrah)														Part of 三台 (Sān Tái, Three Steps) Asterism
中台 (Zhōng Tái, Middle Step)	λ UMa (Tania Borealis)	μ UMa (Tania Australis)														Part of 三台
下台 (Xià Tái, Lower Step)	ν UMa (Alula Borealis)	ξ UMa (Alula Australis)														Part of 三台
虎賁 (Hǔ Bēn, Emperor's Bodyguard)	72 Leo															
少微 (Shào Wēi, Junior Officers)	52 LMi	54 Leo A	41 LMi	51 Leo												
长垣 (Cháng Yuán, Long Wall)	46 Leo	52 Leo	53 Leo	48 Leo												
靈台 (Líng Tái, Astronomical Observatory)	χ Leo	59 Leo	58 Leo													
明堂 (Míng Táng, Cosmological Temple)	τ Leo	υ Leo	87 Leo													
謁者 (Yè Zhě, Usher of the Court)	16 Vir															

Added Stars

Asterism	+1	+2	+3	+4	+5	+6	+7	+8	+9	Note
五帝座 (Wǔ Dì Zuò, Thrones of the Five Emperors)	90 Leo	85 Leo	88 Leo	HIP 57320						
五諸侯 (Wǔ Zhū Hóu, Five Feudal Kings)	40 Com	35 Com	38 Com	25 Com	24 Com	11 Com	3 Com			
九卿 (Jiǔ Qīng, Nine Ministers)	29 Com	29 Com	28 Com	34 Vir	27 Vir	33 Vir	HIP 61579	20 Vir	20 Vir	
內屏 (Nèi Píng, Inner Screen)	ω Vir	4 Vir	6 Vir	12 Vir	11 Vir	7 Vir				
西次相 (Xī Cì Xiàng, Second Western Minister)	Unclear	81 Leo	73 Leo							
西上相 (Xī Shàng Xiàng, First Western Minister)	60 Leo	86 Leo								
左執法 (Zuǒ Zhí Fǎ, Left Law Administrator)	13 Vir									
東次相 (Dōng Cì Xiàng, Second Eastern Minister)	37 Vir									
東次將 (Dōng Cì Jiàng, Second Eastern General)	41 Vir	Unclear	59 Vir							
東上將 (Dōng Shàng Jiàng, First Eastern General)	70 Vir	71 Vir	HIP 66610	HIP 66640						
郎將 (Láng Jiàng, Captain of the Bodyguards)	30 Com	HIP 62857								
郎位 (Láng Wèi, Officers of the Imperial Guard)	10 Com	9 Com	4 Com							
常陳 (Cháng Chén, Imperial Guards)	4 CVn	18 CVn	20 CVn	16 CVn	15 CVn	17 CVn	HIP 64212			
上台 (Shàng Tái, Upper Step)	27 Lyn	26 Lyn	25 Lyn	31 Lyn (Alsciaukat)	35 Lyn	36 Lyn	41 Lyn			
中台 (Zhōng Tái, Middle Step)	Unclear	19 LMi	HIP 50689	HIP 50485						
下台 (Xià Tái, Lower Step)	61 UMa	62 UMa								
少微 (Shào Wēi, Junior Officers)	39 LMi	40 LMi	48 LMi	50 LMi	51 LMi	67 Leo	64 Leo	HIP 53439	54 Leo B	
长垣 (Cháng Yuán, Long Wall)	50 Leo	49 Leo	32 Sex	23 Sex	31 Sex	34 Sex	35 Sex	37 Sex	38 Sex	
靈台 (Líng Tái, Astronomical Observatory)	56 Leo	36 Sex	55 Leo	57 Leo	61 Leo	66 Leo	62 Leo	65 Leo		
明堂 (Míng Táng, Cosmological Temple)	89 Leo	80 Leo	79 Leo	75 Leo	69 Leo	φ Leo	87 Leo			
謁者 (Yè Zhě, Usher of the Court)	10 Vir	17 Vir								

=== Heavenly Market Enclosure ===
The Heavenly Market Enclosure (天市垣, Tiān Shì Yuán) represents the emperor's realm. It corresponds to constellations Aquila, Boötes, Corona Borealis, Draco, Hercules, Ophiuchus, Sagitta, Serpens and Vulpecula.

Asterism	1	2	3	4	5	6	7	8	9	10	11	Note
帝座 (Dì Zuò, Emperor's Seat)	α Her (Rasalgethi)											
候 (Hòu, Astrologer)	α Oph (Rasalhague)											
宦者 (Huàn Zhě, Eunuch Official)	32 Oph	HIP 83478	60 Her	37 Oph								
斗 (Dǒu, Dipper [for Liquids])	ω Her (Cujam)	49 Ser	13 Her	29 Her	33 Her							
斛 (Hú, Dipper [for Solids])	ι Oph	κ Oph	47 Her	43 Her								
列肆 (Liè Sì, Jewel Market)	σ Ser	λ Oph (Marfik)										
車肆 (Chē Sì, Commodity Market)	υ Oph	20 Oph										
市樓 (Shì Lóu, Municipal Office)	μ Oph	ο Ser	τ Oph	ν Ser	HIP 85397	HIP 86768						
宗正 (Zōng Zhèng, Official for Royal Clan)	β Oph (Cebalrai)	γ Oph (Bake-eo)										
宗人 (Zōng Rén, Official for Religious Ceremonies)	66 Oph	67 Oph	68 Oph	70 Oph								
宗 (Zōng, Patriarchal Clan)	110 Her	111 Her										
帛度 (Bó Dù, Textile Ruler)	95 Her (Bodu)	102 Her (Ramus)										
屠肆 (Tú Sì, Butcher's Shops)	109 Her (Tusizuo)	98 Her										
天市右垣 (Tiān Shì Yòu Yuán, Right Wall)	河中 (Hé Zhōng, Hezhong) β Her (Kornephoros)	河間 (Hé Jiān, Hejian) γ Her	晉 (Jìn, Jin) κ Her A (Marsic)	鄭 (Zhèng, Zheng) γ Ser	周 (Zhōu, Zhou) β Ser (Zhou)	秦 (Qín, Qin) δ Ser	蜀 (Shǔ, Shu) α Ser (Unukalhai)	巴 (Bā, Ba) ε Ser	梁 (Liáng, Liang) δ Oph (Yed Prior)	楚 (Chǔ, Chu) ε Oph (Yed Posterior)	韓 (Hán, Han) ζ Oph (Han)	
天市左垣 (Tiān Shì Zuǒ Yuán, Left Wall)	魏 (Wèi, Wei) δ Her (Sarin)	趙 (Zhào, Zhao) λ Her (Maasym)	九河 (Jiǔ Hé, Jiuhe) μ Her	中山 (Zhōng Shān, Zhongshan) ο Her	齊 (Qí, Qi); 112 Her	吳越 (Wú Yuè, Wuyue) ζ Aql (Okab)	徐 (Xú, Xu) θ Ser (Alya)	東海 (Dōng Hǎi, Donghai) η Ser	燕 (Yān, Yan) ν Oph	南海 (Nán Hǎi, Nanhai) ξ Ser	宋 (Sòng, Song) η Oph (Sabik)	
天紀 (Tiān Jì, Celestial Discipline)	ξ CrB	ζ Her (Tianji)	ε Her (Khepdenreret)	59 Her	61 Her	68 Her	HIP 86178	Unclear	θ Her			
女床 (Nǚ Chuáng, Woman's Bed)	π Her (Nüchuang)	69 Her	ρ Her									
貫索 (Guàn Suǒ, Coiled Thong)	π CrB (Stephanos)	θ CrB (Guansuo)	β CrB (Nusakan)	α CrB (Alphecca)	γ CrB (Baltesha)	δ CrB (Matrichakra)	ε CrB	ι CrB (Aurwandilsta)	ρ CrB			
七公 (Qī Gōng, Seven Excellencies)	42 Her	τ Her (Asuusiha)	φ Her	χ Her	ν1 Boo	μ Boo (Alkalurops)	δ Boo (Qigong)					

Added Stars

Asterism	+1	+2	+3	+4	+5	+6	+7	+8	+9	+10	+11	12	+13	+14	+15	+16	+17	Note
候 (Hòu, Astrologer)	Unclear	Unclear	54 Oph	56 Oph	53 Oph	Unclear												
宦者 (Huàn Zhě, Eunuch Official)	54 Oph	54 Oph	49 Her	HIP 83504	e Oph													
斗 (Dǒu, Dipper [for Liquids])	ω Her (Cujam)	15 Her	46 Ser	45 Ser	47 Ser	12 Her	9 Her	Unclear	21 Her	28 Her	28 Her							
斛 (Hú, Dipper [for Solids])	43 Her	41 Her	45 Her	38 Her	36 Her	37 Her	Unclear											
列肆 (Liè Sì, Jewel Market)	21 Oph	16 Oph	14 Oph	12 Oph														
車肆 (Chē Sì, Commodity Market)	23 Oph	30 Oph																
市樓 (Shì Lóu, Municipal Office)	ν Ser																	
宗正 (Zōng Zhèng, Official for Royal Clan)	61 Oph	σ Oph	41 Oph															
宗人 (Zōng Rén, Official for Religious Ceremonies)	72 Oph	71 Oph	73 Oph	74 Oph														
帛度 (Bó Dù, Textile Ruler)	96 Her	101 Her	93 Her															
屠肆 (Tú Sì, Butcher's Shops)	97 Her	105 Her	106 Her															
河間 (Hé Jiān, Hejian)	16 Her																	
晉 (Jìn, Jin)	5 Her	8 Her	q Her	8 Her	κ Her B													
周 (Zhōu, Zhou)	τ1 Ser	τ4 Ser	τ5 Ser	τ6 Ser	τ3 Ser	τ7 Ser	ι Ser	κ Ser (Gudja)	τ8 Ser	Unclear	29 Ser	υ Ser	39 Ser	χ Ser	υ Ser	HIP 77412		
秦 (Qín, Qin)	Unclear	16 Ser																
蜀 (Shǔ, Shu)	λ Ser	3 Ser	HIP 77163															
巴 (Bā, Ba)	ψ Ser	ω Ser	HIP 78442	43 Ser	36 Ser													
魏 (Wèi, Wei)	51 Her	56 Her	57 Her	HIP 83830	62 Her	70 Her	70 Her	73 Her										
趙 (Zhào, Zhao)	78 Her	79 Her	84 Her															
九河 (Jiǔ Hé, Jiuhe)	87 Her																	
中山 (Zhōng Shān, Zhongshan)	ξ Her	μ Her	99 Her	104 Her	108 Her	107 Her	100 Her											
齊 (Qí, Qi)	113 Her	1 Sge	1 Vul	2 Vul	α Vul (Anser)	HIP 95744	HIP 95492	3 Vul	HIP 93975	HIP 94382	8 Vul	HIP 96081						
吳越 (Wú Yuè, Wuyue)	ε Aql (Arin-majlep)	10 Aql	11 Aql	18 Aql	ω1 Aql	28 Aql	31 Aql											
徐 (Xú, Xu)	4 Aql	62 Ser	19 Aql	64 Ser														
東海 (Dōng Hǎi, Donghai)	ζ Ser	59 Ser	61 Ser	60 Ser														
宋 (Sòng, Song)	V841 Oph	29 Oph																
天紀 (Tiān Jì, Celestial Discipline)	η Her	25 Her	ν2 CrB	23 Her	26 Her	32 Her	39 Her	46 Her	50 Her	48 Her	53 Her	Unclear	72 Her	90 Her	HIP 85181			
貫索 (Guàn Suǒ, Coiled Thong)	χ Boo	ο CrB	η CrB	κ CrB	λ CrB	τ CrB	σ CrB	υ CrB	19 Her	17 Her	10 Her	π Ser	ρ Ser					
七公 (Qī Gōng, Seven Excellencies)	17 Dra	16 Dra	34 Her	υ Her	β Boo (Nekkar)	40 Boo	ζ CrB	μ CrB	ν2 Boo	φ Boo	4 Her	2 Her	14 Her	30 Her	σ Her	52 Her	HD 149026 (Ogma)	

== Azure Dragon ==
=== Horn ===
The Horn mansion represents the Dragon's horns. It corresponds to constellations Centaurus, Circinus, Coma Berenices, Hydra, Lupus and Virgo.

Asterism	1	2	3	4	5	6	7	8	9	10	11	Note
角宿 (Jiǎo Xiù, Horn Mansion)	α Vir (Spica)	ζ Vir (Heze)										
平道 (Píng Dào, Flat Road)	θ Vir	82 Vir										
天田 (Tiān Tián, Celestial Farmland)	78 Vir	τ Vir										
周鼎 (Zhōu Dǐng, Tripod of the Zhou)	β Com	37 Com	41 Com									
進賢 (Jìn Xián, Recommending Virtuous Man)	44 Vir											
天門 (Tiān Mén, Celestial Gate)	53 Vir	69 Vir										
平 (Píng, Judging)	γ Hya (Naga)	π Hya										
庫樓 (Kù Lóu, Arsenal)	ζ Cen (Leepwal)	η Cen	θ Cen (Menkent)	2 Cen	d Cen	f Cen	γ Cen	τ Cen	D Cen	σ Cen		
柱 (Zhù, Pillars)	υ2 Cen	υ1 Cen	ι Lup	τ1 Lup	HD 125823	ψ Cen	4 Cen	3 Cen	1 Cen	π Cen	ι Cen (Kulou)	
衡 (Héng, Railings)	ν Cen (Heng)	μ Cen	φ Cen	χ Cen								
南門 (Nán Mén, Southern Gate)	ε Cen	α Cen (Rigil Kentaurus)										

Added Stars

Asterism	+1	+2	+3	+4	+5	+6	+7	+8	+9	+10	+11	+12	+13	+14	+15	+16	Note
角宿 (Jiǎo Xiù, Horn Mansion)	65 Vir	72 Vir	74 Vir (Apamvatsa)	80 Vir	81 Vir	88 Vir	86 Vir	76 Vir	68 Vir	62 Vir	58 Vir	56 Vir	Uncertain	50 Vir	49 Vir	66 Vir	
天田 (Tiān Tián, Celestial Farmland)	σ Vir	64 Vir	84 Vir	92 Vir	92 Vir	90 Vir	τ Vir										
進賢 (Jìn Xián, Recommending Virtuous Man)	38 Vir	44 Vir	46 Vir	48 Vir	ψ Vir	39 Vir	28 Vir	χ Vir	25 Vir								
天門 (Tiān Mén, Celestial Gate)	57 Vir	55 Vir	54 Vir	61 Vir	63 Vir	75 Vir	83 Vir	85 Vir	89 Vir	87 Vir	73 Vir						
平 (Píng, Judging)	45 Hya	47 Hya	48 Hya	47 Hya													
庫樓 (Kù Lóu, Arsenal)	ω Cen																
南門 (Nán Mén, Southern Gate)	R Cen	α Cir (Xami)															

=== Neck ===
The Neck mansion represents the Dragon's neck. It corresponds to constellations Boötes, Centaurus, Hydra, Libra, Lupus and Virgo.

Asterism	1	2	3	4	5	6	7	Note
亢宿 (Kàng Xiù, Neck Mansion)	κ Vir (Kang)	ι Vir (Syrma)	φ Vir (Elgafar)	λ Vir (Khambalia)				
大角 (Dà Jiǎo, Great Horn)	α Boo (Arcturus)							
右攝提 (Yòu Shè Tí, Right Conductor)	η Boo (Muphrid)	τ Boo (Tepiamenit)	υ Boo					
左攝提 (Zuǒ Shè Tí, Left Conductor)	ο Boo	π1 Boo	ζ Boo					
折威 (Zhé Wēi, Executions)	50 Hya	Unclear	3 Lib	4 Lib	4 Lib	12 Lib	σ Lib (Brachium)	
頓頑 (Dùn Wán, Trials)	φ1 Lup	1 Lup						
陽門 (Yáng Mén, Gate of Yang)	b Cen	c1 Cen						

Added Stars

Asterism	+1	+2	+3	+4	+5	+6	+7	+8	+9	+10	+11	+12	Note
亢宿 (Kàng Xiù, Neck Mansion)	94 Vir	95 Vir	96 Vir	97 Vir	106 Vir	104 Vir	μ Vir	11 Lib	108 Vir	109 Vir (Maenalus)	103 Vir	υ Vir	
大角 (Dà Jiǎo, Great Horn)	22 Boo	CN Boo											
右攝提 (Yòu Shè Tí, Right Conductor)	6 Boo	2 Boo	1 Boo	HIP 66992	τ Boo (Tepiamenit)	7 Boo							
左攝提 (Zuǒ Shè Tí, Left Conductor)	ξ Boo	32 Boo	31 Boo	DE Boo									
折威 (Zhé Wēi, Executions)	50 Hya	51 Hya	54 Hya	55 Hya	56 Hya	HIP 73189	57 Hya						
頓頑 (Dùn Wán, Trials)	φ2 Lup												

=== Root ===
The Root mansion represents the Dragon's chest. It corresponds to constellations Boötes, Centaurus, Hydra, Libra, Lupus, Serpens and Virgo.

Asterism	1	2	3	4	5	6	7	8	9	10	Note
氐宿 (Dī Xiù, Root Mansion)	α2 Lib (Zubenelgenubi)	ι1 Lib	γ Lib (Zubenelhakrabi)	β Lib (Zubeneschamali)							
亢池 (Kàng Chí, Boats and Lake)	20 Boo	HIP 69260	14 Boo	18 Boo	Uncertain	Uncertain					
帝席 (Dì Xí, Mattress of the Emperor)	12 Boo	11 Boo	9 Boo								
梗河 (Gěng Hé, Celestial Lance) (Note: Book of Jin, Volume 11. 北三星曰梗河，天矛也。一曰天锋，主胡兵。又为丧，故其变动应以兵丧也。)	ε Boo (Izar)	σ Boo (Genghe)	ρ Boo (Kalasungsang)								
招搖 (Zhāo Yáo, Twinkling Indicator)	γ Boo (Seginus)										
天乳 (Tiān Rǔ, Celestial Milk)	μ Ser										
天輻 (Tiān Fú, Celestial Spokes)	υ Lib	τ Lib									
陣車 (Zhèn Chē, Battle Chariots)	E Hya (Solitaire)	60 Hya	f Lup								
騎官 (Qí Guān, Imperial Guards)	γ Lup	δ Lup	κ Cen	β Lup	λ Lup	ε Lup	μ Lup	π Lup	ο Lup	α Lup (Uridim)	
車騎 (Chē Qí, Chariots and Cavalry)	ζ Lup	ρ Lup	σ Lup								
騎陣將軍 (Qí Zhèn Jiāng Jūn, Chariot and Cavalry General)	κ Lup										

Added Stars

Asterism	+1	+2	+3	+4	+5	+6	+7	+8	+9	+10	+11	+12	+13	+14	+15	+16	+17	+18	+19	+20	+21	+22	+23	+24	+25	+26	+27	+28	+29	+30	Note
氐宿 (Dī Xiù, Root Mansion)	δ Lib (Zuben Elakribi)	18 Lib	ξ2 Lib	ξ1 Lib	μ Lib	5 Lib	α1 Lib	10 Lib	22 Lib	ν Lib	25 Lib	26 Lib	28 Lib	ζ Lib	34 Lib	32 Lib	ο Lib	30 Lib	37 Lib	ε Lib	A1 Ser	14 Ser	10 Ser	5 Ser	6 Ser	4 Ser	110 Vir	2 Ser	16 Lib	17 Lib	
帝席 (Dì Xí, Mattress of the Emperor)	3 Boo																														
梗河 (Gěng Hé, Celestial Lance)	ψ Boo	46 Boo	45 Boo	ω Boo	W Boo (Alrumh)																										
天乳 (Tiān Rǔ, Celestial Milk)	A2 Ser	36 Ser	30 Ser	30 Ser																											
天輻 (Tiān Fú, Celestial Spokes)	36 Lib																														
陣車 (Zhèn Chē, Battle Chariots)	E Hya (Solitaire)	59 Hya																													

=== Room ===
The Room mansion represents the Dragon's abdomen. It corresponds to constellations Libra, Lupus, Ophiuchus and Scorpius.

Asterism	1	2	3	4	Note
房宿 (Fáng Xiù, Room Mansion)	π Sco (Fang)	ρ Sco (Iklil)	δ Sco (Dschubba)	β Sco (Acrab)	
鉤鈐 (Gōu Qián, Lock)	ω1 Sco	ω2 Sco			
鍵閉 (Jiàn Bì, Door Bolt)	ν Sco (Jabbah)				
罰 (Fá, Punishment)	18 Sco	11 Sco	49 Lib		
西咸 (Xī Xián, Western Door)	ξ Sco	48 Lib	θ Lib	η Lib	
東咸 (Dōng Xián, Eastern Door)	φ Oph	χ Oph	ψ Oph	ω Oph	
日 (Rì, Sun)	κ Lib				
從官 (Cóng Guān, Retinue)	ψ2 Lup	χ Lup			

Added Stars

Asterism	+1	+2	+3	+4	+5	+6	Note
房宿 (Fáng Xiù, Room Mansion)	47 Lib	λ Lib	42 Lib	1 Sco	2 Sco	4 Sco	
罰 (Fá, Punishment)	16 Sco	ψ Sco	χ Sco				
西咸 (Xī Xián, Western Door)	50 Lib	Unclear					
東咸 (Dōng Xián, Eastern Door)	24 Sco	ω Oph					
日 (Rì, Sun)	41 Lib						
從官 (Cóng Guān, Retinue)	ψ1 Lup						

=== Heart ===
The Heart mansion represents the Dragon's heart. It corresponds to constellations Lupus, Ophiuchus and Scorpius.

Asterism	1	2	3	Note
心宿 (Xīn Xiù, Heart Mansion)	σ Sco (Alniyat)	α Sco (Antares)	τ Sco (Paikauhale)	
積卒 (Jī Zú, Group of Soldiers)	θ Lup	η Lup		

Added Stars

Asterism	+1	+2	+3	+4	+5	+6	+7	+8	+9	Note
心宿 (Xīn Xiù, Heart Mansion)	12 Sco	13 Sco	ο Sco	ρ Oph	22 Sco	15 Oph	18 Oph	25 Sco	ρ Oph	
積卒 (Jī Zú, Group of Soldiers)	η Lup	HIP 18970								

=== Tail ===
The Tail mansion represents the Dragon's tail. It corresponds to constellations Ara, Ophiuchus and Scorpius.

Asterism	1	2	3	4	5	6	7	8	9	Note
尾宿 (Wěi Xiù, Tail Mansion)	μ1 Sco (Xamidimura)	ε Sco (Larawag)	ζ Sco	η Sco	θ Sco (Sargas)	ι1 Sco	κ Sco (Girtab)	λ Sco (Shaula)	υ Sco (Lesath)	
神宮 (Shén Gōng, Changing Room)	NGC 6231									
天江 (Tiān Jiāng, Celestial River)	HIP 84314	36 Oph A (Guniibuu)	θ Oph	b Oph						
傅說 (Fù Yuè, Fu Yue)	G Sco (Fuyue)									
魚 (Yú, Fish)	M7									
龜 (Guī, Tortoise)	ε1 Ara	γ Ara	δ Ara	η Ara	ζ Ara (Tseen Yin)					

Added Stars

Asterism	+1	+2	+3	+4	+5	+6	+7	+8	+9	+10	+11	Note
尾宿 (Wěi Xiù, Tail Mansion)	27 Sco	μ2 Sco (Pipirima)	Q Sco	HIP 87472								
天江 (Tiān Jiāng, Celestial River)	43 Oph	38 Oph	36 Oph C	HIP 84947	191 Oph	ο Oph	ξ Oph	HIP 83684	26 Oph	28 Oph	31 Oph C	

=== Winnowing Basket ===
The Winnowing Basket mansion is the last of the Azure Dragon mansions. It corresponds to constellations Ara, Ophiuchus and Sagittarius.

Asterism	1	2	3	4	Note
箕宿 (Jī Xiù, Winnowing Basket Mansion)	γ Sgr (Alnasl)	δ Sgr (Kaus Media)	ε Sgr (Kaus Australis)	η Sgr (Heryibwia)	
糠 (Kāng, Chaff)	d Oph				
杵 (Chǔ, Pestle)	σ Ara	α Ara (Choo)	β Ara		

Added Stars

Asterism	+1	Note
糠 (Kāng, Chaff)	HIP 85442	
杵 (Chǔ, Pestle)	θ Ara	

== Black Turtle ==
=== Dipper ===
The Dipper mansion is the first of the Black Turtle mansions. It corresponds to constellations Aquila, Corona Australis, Ophiuchus, Sagittarius, Scutum and Telescopium.

Asterism	1	2	3	4	5	6	7	8	9	10	11	Note
斗宿 (Dǒu Xiù, Dipper Mansion)	φ Sgr (Nandou)	λ Sgr (Kaus Borealis)	μ Sgr (Polis)	σ Sgr (Nunki)	τ Sgr	ζ Sgr (Ascella)						
天籥 (Tiān Yuè, Celestial Keyhole)	63 Oph	HIP 87099	58 Oph	HIP 86352	52 Oph	51 Oph	HIP 85783	X Sgr				
天弁 (Tiān Biàn, Market Officer)	α Sct (Tianbian)	δ Sct	ε Sct	β Sct	η Sct	i Aql	λ Aql	15 Aql	14 Aql			
建 (Jiàn, Establishment)	ξ2 Sgr (Jian)	ο Sgr (Alqiladah)	π Sgr (Albaldah)	d Sgr	ρ1 Sgr (Kenemu)	υ Sgr						
天雞 (Tiān Jī, Celestial Cock)	e2 Sgr	f Sgr										
狗 (Gǒu, Dog)	h2 Sgr	χ1 Sgr										
狗國 (Gǒu Guó, Territory of Dogs)	ω Sgr (Terebellum)	A Sgr	c Sgr (Gouguo)	b Sgr								
天淵 (Tiān Yuān, Celestial Spring)	β2 Sgr (Arkab Posterior)	β1 Sgr(Arkab Prior)	α Sgr (Rukbat)									
農丈人 (Nóng Zhàng Rén, Old Peasant)	HIP 91918											
鱉 (Biē, River Turtle)	α Tel	η1 CrA	ζ CrA	δ CrA (Qedty)	β CrA (Alqubba)	α CrA (Meridiana)	γ CrA	ε CrA	V686 CrA	κ2 CrA	θ CrA (Bie)	

Added Stars

Asterism	+1	+2	+3	+4	+5	+6	+7	+8	+9	+10	Note
斗宿 (Dǒu Xiù, Dipper Mansion)	6 Sgr	15 Sgr	21 Sgr	26 Sgr	15 Sgr						
天籥 (Tiān Yuè, Celestial Keyhole)	50 Oph	4 Sgr (Tianyue)	5 Sgr	7 Sgr							
天弁 (Tiān Biàn, Market Officer)	5 Aql	7 Aql	8 Aql	20 Aql	26 Aql	HIP 92488					
建 (Jiàn, Establishment)	29 Sgr	ξ1 Sgr	33 Sgr	31 Sgr	30 Sgr	ν1 Sgr (Ainalrami)	ν2 Sgr (Pabilsang)	ρ2 Sgr	HIP 94823	HIP 94859	
天雞 (Tiān Jī, Celestial Cock)	e1 Sgr	57 Sgr	g Sgr								
狗 (Gǒu, Dog)	h1 Sgr	53 Sgr	50 Sgr	χ3 Sgr	χ2 Sgr	ψ Sgr	χ3 Sgr				
狗國 (Gǒu Guó, Territory of Dogs)	HIP 98842	θ2 Sgr	HIP 99461								
天淵 (Tiān Yuān, Celestial Spring)	ι Sgr	θ1 Sgr	HIP 98761								

=== Ox ===
The Ox mansion corresponds to constellations Aquila, Capricornus, Cygnus, Delphinus, Lyra, Microscopium, Sagitta, Sagittarius and Vulpecula. Its name derives from the Cowherd Star.

Asterism	1	2	3	4	5	6	7	8	9	Note
牛宿 (Niú Xiù, Ox Mansion)	β Cap (Dabih)	α2 Cap (Algedi)	ξ2 Cap	π Cap	ο Cap	ρ Cap				
天桴 (Tiān Fú, Celestial Drumstick)	θ Aql (Antinous)	62 Aql	58 Aql	η Aql (Pagru)						
河鼓 (Hé Gǔ, Drum at the River)	β Aql (Alshain)	α Aql (Altair)	γ Aql (Tarazed)							Also translated as "Drum-Bearer".
右旗 (Yòu Qí, Right Flag)	μ Aql	σ Aql (Hru)	δ Aql (Guqi)	ν Aql	ι Aql	HIP 96392	42 Aql	κ Aql	56 Aql	
左旗 (Zuǒ Qí, Left Flag)	α Sge (Sham)	β Sge (Shakh)	δ Sge (Zuoqi)	ζ Sge	γ Sge (Telum)	VZ Sge	11 Sge	14 Sge	ρ Aql (Tso Ke)	
織女 (Zhī Nǚ, Weaving Girl)	α Lyr (Vega)	ε1 Lyr (Pongaponga for A)	ζ1 Lyr (Kautoki)							
漸臺 (Jiàn Tái, Clepsydra Terrace)	δ2 Lyr (Jiantai)	β Lyr (Sheliak)	γ Lyr (Sulafat)	ι Lyr						
輦道 (Niǎn Dào, Imperial Passageway)	13 Lyr (Niandao)	η Lyr (Aladfar)	θ Lyr (Ninnisig)	4 Cyg	17 Cyg					
羅堰 (Luó Yàn, Networks of Dikes)	τ Cap	υ Cap	17 Cap							
天田 (Tiān Tián, Celestial Farmland)	3 PsA	ω Cap	24 Cap	ψ Cap						
九坎 (Jiǔ Kǎn, Nine Water Wells)	θ1 Mic	η Mic	ι Mic	ζ Mic	Unclear	Unclear	Unclear	Unclear	Unclear	

Added Stars

Asterism	+1	+2	+3	+4	+5	+6	+7	+8	+9	+10	+11	+12	+13	+14	+15	+16	+17	+18	+19	+20	+21	+22	+23	+24	+25	+26	+27	+28	+29	+30	Note
牛宿 (Niú Xiù, Ox Mansion)	63 Sgr	65 Sgr	64 Sgr	ξ1 Cap	3 Cap	α1 Cap (Sukhurmashu)	ν Cap (Alshat)	σ Cap	4 Cap	HIP 99825	ν Cap (Alshat)	β2 Cap	π Cap	HIP 101040																	
天桴 (Tiān Fú, Celestial Drumstick)	64 Aql	66 Aql																													
河鼓 (Hé Gǔ, Drum at the River)	ψ Aql	46 Aql	χ Aql	π Aql	ο Aql	φ Aql	τ Aql (Tianfu)	ξ Aql (Libertas)	υ Aql																						
右旗 (Yòu Qí, Right Flag)	22 Aql	21 Aql	27 Aql	35 Aql	45 Aql	ι Aql	36 Aql	36 Aql	Unclear	37 Aql	51 Aql	57 Aql																			
左旗 (Zuǒ Qí, Left Flag)	ε Sge	3 Sge	2 Sge	4 Vul	5 Vul	7 Vul	9 Vul	10 Vul	CK Vul	15 Vul	21 Vul	23 Vul	18 Vul	19 Vul	20 Vul	16 Vul	13 Vul	12 Vul	14 Vul	17 Vul	24 Vul	25 Vul	22 Vul	18 Sge	θ Sge	η Sge	15 Sge	10 Sge	9 Sge	HIP 98609	
織女 (Zhī Nǚ, Weaving Girl)	ζ2 Lyr (Urquchillay)	ε2 Lyr	μ Lyr	κ Lyr																											
漸臺 (Jiàn Tái, Clepsydra Terrace)	δ1 Lyr	Unclear	17 Lyr	λ Lyr	ν2 Lyr	ν1 Lyr	HIP 94484																								
輦道 (Niǎn Dào, Imperial Passageway)	16 Lyr	η Lyr (Aladfar)	11 Cyg	15 Cyg	η Cyg (Almighzal)	φ Cyg	β Cyg (Albireo)	2 Cyg	8 Cyg																						
羅堰 (Luó Yàn, Networks of Dikes)	13 Cap																														

=== Girl ===
The Girl mansion corresponds to constellations Aquarius, Aquila, Capricornus, Cygnus, Draco and Delphinus.

Asterism	1	2	3	4	5	6	7	8	9	Note
女宿 (Nǚ Xiù, Girl Mansion)	ε Aqr (Albali)	μ Aqr	4 Aqr	3 Aqr						
離珠 (Lí Zhū, Pearls on Ladies' Wear)	70 Aql	l Aql	1 Aqr	69 Aql						
敗瓜 (Bài Guā, Rotten Gourd)	ε Del (Aldulfin)	η Del	θ Del	ι Del	κ Del					
瓠瓜 (Hù Guā, Good Gourd)	α Del (Sualocin)	γ Del (Dhanishta)	δ Del	β Del (Rotanev)	ζ Del					
天津 (Tiān Jīn, Celestial Ford)	γ Cyg (Sadr)	δ Cyg (Fawaris)	30 Cyg	α Cyg (Deneb)	ν Cyg	τ Cyg (Enduri Senggu)	υ Cyg	ζ Cyg (Tianjinnan)	ε Cyg (Aljanah)	
奚仲 (Xī Zhòng, Xi Zhong)	κ Cyg	ι2 Cyg	θ Cyg	c Cyg						
扶筐 (Fú Kuāng, Basket for Mulberry Leaves)	46 Dra	45 Dra	39 Dra	ο Dra	48 Dra	49 Dra	51 Dra			
周 (Zhōu, Zhou)	η Cap	21 Cap								Part of 十二國 (Shí Èr Guó, Twelve Countries) Asterism.
秦 (Qín, Qin)	θ Cap (Udang)	30 Cap								Part of 十二國.
代 (Dài, Dai)	ι Cap	38 Cap								Part of 十二國.
趙 (Zhào, Zhao)	26 Cap	27 Cap								Part of 十二國.
越 (Yuè, Yue)	19 Cap									Part of 十二國.
齊 (Qí, Qi)	χ Cap									Part of 十二國.
楚 (Chǔ, Chu)	φ Cap									Part of 十二國.
鄭 (Zhèng, Zheng)	20 Cap									Part of 十二國.
魏 (Wèi, Wei)	33 Cap									Part of 十二國.
韓 (Hán, Han)	35 Cap									Part of 十二國.
晉 (Jìn, Jin)	36 Cap									Part of 十二國.
燕 (Yān, Yan)	ζ Cap									Part of 十二國.

Added Stars

Asterism	+1	+2	+3	+4	+5	+6	+7	+8	+9	+10	+11	+12	+13	+14	+15	+16	+17	+18	+19	+20	+21	+22	+23	+24	+25	+26	+27	+28	+29	+30	+31	+32	+33	+34	+35	+36	+37	+38	+39	+40	Note
女宿 (Nǚ Xiù, Girl Mansion)	5 Aqr	11 Aqr	10 Aqr	12 Aqr	7 Aqr																																				
離珠 (Lí Zhū, Pearls on Ladies' Wear)	68 Aql																																								
敗瓜 (Bài Guā, Rotten Gourd)	1 Del	14 Del	13 Del																																						
瓠瓜 (Hù Guā, Good Gourd)	10 Del	15 Del	16 Del	17 Del	29 Vul	HIP 101909	γ1 Del (Dhanishta)	17 Del																																	
天津 (Tiān Jīn, Celestial Ford)	14 Cyg	19 Cyg	22 Cyg	25 Cyg	27 Cyg	28 Cyg	29 Cyg	36 Cyg	p Cyg	40 Cyg	44 Cyg	42 Cyg	47 Cyg	35 Cyg	39 Cyg	41 Cyg	48 Cyg	49 Cyg	52 Cyg	27 Vul	26 Vul	28 Vul	30 Vul	31 Vul	32 Vul	69 Cyg	70 Cyg	σ Cyg	61 Cyg	λ Cyg	56 Cyg	57 Cyg	55 Cyg	ω2 Cyg	ω1 Cyg	43 Cyg	ο2 Cyg	ο1 Cyg	T Cyg	T Cyg	
奚仲 (Xī Zhòng, Xi Zhong)	7 Cyg	20 Cyg	26 Cyg	33 Cyg	HIP 98073	23 Cyg	31 Cyg																																		
扶筐 (Fú Kuāng, Basket for Mulberry Leaves)	36 Dra	42 Dra (Fafnir)	54 Dra	53 Dra																																					
代 (Dài, Dai)	37 Cap	41 Cap																																							

=== Ruins ===
The Ruins mansion (also translated as Emptiness) corresponds to constellations Aquarius, Capricornus, Delphinus, Equuleus, Grus, Microscopium, Pegasus and Piscis Austrinus.

Asterism	1	2	3	4	5	6	7	8	9	10	11	12	13	Note
虛宿 (Xū Xiù, Ruins Mansion)	β Aqr (Sadalsuud)	α Equ (Kitalpha)												
司命 (Sī Mìng, Judge of Life)	24 Aqr	26 Aqr												
司祿 (Sī Lù, Judge of Rank)	11 Peg	25 Aqr												
司危 (Sī Wēi, Judge of Disaster and Good Fortune)	β Equ	9 Equ												
司非 (Sī Fēi, Judge of Right and Wrong)	γ Equ	δ Equ (Tepennekhet)												
哭 (Kū, Crying)	μ Cap	38 Aqr												
泣 (Qì, Weeping)	ρ Aqr	θ Aqr (Ancha)												
璃瑜 (Lí Yú, Jade Ornament on Ladies' Wear)	α Mic	ε Mic (Aerostaticus)	5 PsA											
天壘城 (Tiān Lěi Chéng, Celestial Ramparts)	ξ Aqr (Bunda)	46 Cap	47 Cap	λ Cap	50 Cap	18 Aqr	29 Cap	9 Aqr	8 Aqr	ν Aqr	14 Aqr	17 Aqr	19 Aqr	
敗臼 (Bài Jiù, Decayed Mortar)	γ Gru (Aldhanab)	λ Gru	γ PsA	19 PsA										

Added Stars

Asterism	+1	+2	+3	+4	+5	+6	+7	+8	Note
虛宿 (Xū Xiù, Ruins Mansion)	λ Equ	4 Equ	3 Equ	ε Equ	15 Aqr	16 Aqr	21 Aqr	20 Aqr	
司非 (Sī Fēi, Judge of Right and Wrong)	6 Equ (Protome)	δ Del	6 Equ (Protome)						
哭 (Kū, Crying)	42 Cap	44 Cap	45 Cap	37 Aqr					
泣 (Qì, Weeping)	30 Aqr	36 Aqr							
璃瑜 (Lí Yú, Jade Ornament on Ladies' Wear)	γ Mic	2 PsA	6 PsA						
天壘城 (Tiān Lěi Chéng, Celestial Ramparts)	Unclear	ν Aqr	HD 206610						
敗臼 (Bài Jiù, Decayed Mortar)	β PsA (Tiangang)								

=== Rooftop ===
The Rooftop mansion corresponds to constellations Andromeda, Aquarius, Cepheus, Cygnus, Draco, Lacerta, Pegasus, Piscis Austrinus and Vulpecula.

Asterism	1	2	3	4	5	6	7	8	9	Note
危宿 (Wēi Xiù, Rooftop Mansion)	α Aqr (Sadalmelik)	θ Peg (Biham)	ε Peg (Enif)							
墳墓 (Fén Mù, Tomb)	ζ Aqr	γ Aqr (Sadachbia)	η Aqr (Fenmu)	π Aqr						
蓋屋 (Gài Wū, Roofing)	ο Aqr	32 Aqr								
虛梁 (Xū Liáng, Temple)	44 Aqr	51 Aqr	κ Aqr (Situla)	HIP 113345						
天錢 (Tiān Qián, Celestial Money)	13 PsA	θ PsA	ι PsA (Baijiu)	μ PsA	τ PsA					
人 (Rén, Humans)	2 Peg	1 Peg	12 Peg	9 Peg						
杵 (Chǔ, Pestle)	1 Lac	π2 Peg (Neichu)	23 Peg							
臼 (Jiù, Mortar)	μ1 Cyg	κ Peg	ι Peg (Jiu)	32 Peg						
車府 (Chē Fǔ, Yard for Chariots)	15 Lac	11 Lac	2 Lac	ρ Cyg	f1 Cyg	ξ Cyg	74 Cyg			
造父 (Zào Fù, Zao Fu)	δ Cep	ζ Cep	λ Cep	μ Cep (Garnet Star)	ν Cep					
天鈎 (Tiān Gōu, Celestial Hook)	4 Cep	HD 194298	θ Cep	η Cep	α Cep (Alderamin)	ξ Cep (Kurhah)	26 Cep	ι Cep	ο Cep	

Added Stars

Asterism	+1	+2	+3	+4	+5	+6	+7	+8	+9	+10	+11	+12	+13	+14	+15	+16	+17	+18	+19	+20	Note
危宿 (Wēi Xiù, Rooftop Mansion)	3 Peg	4 Peg	7 Peg	28 Aqr	30 Peg	ν Peg	18 Peg	19 Peg	21 Peg	20 Peg	17 Peg	HIP 108127	17 Peg	HIP 108766							
墳墓 (Fén Mù, Tomb)	34 Peg	35 Peg	37 Peg	60 Aqr																	
天錢 (Tiān Qián, Celestial Money)	η PsA	11 PsA	8 PsA	7 PsA																	
人 (Rén, Humans)	33 Vul	Unclear	5 Peg	13 Peg																	
杵 (Chǔ, Pestle)	π1 Peg	38 Peg																			
臼 (Jiù, Mortar)	14 Peg	15 Peg	16 Peg	25 Peg	28 Peg	HIP 109276	Unclear	Unclear													
車府 (Chē Fǔ, Yard for Chariots)	51 Cyg	60 Cyg	f2 Cyg	g Cyg	75 Cyg	77 Cyg	76 Cyg	72 Cyg	6 Lac	8 Lac	10 Lac	12 Lac	13 Lac	14 Lac	16 Lac	ο And (Alfarasalkamil)	2 And	6 And	5 Lac	ο And (Alfarasalkamil)	
造父 (Zào Fù, Zao Fu)	14 Cep	HIP 109190	15 Cep	12 Cep	ν Cep																
天鈎 (Tiān Gōu, Celestial Hook)	66 Dra	68 Dra	71 Dra	71 Dra	6 Cep	6 Cep	7 Cep	7 Cep	9 Cep	9 Cep	19 Cep	19 Cep	20 Cep	25 Cep	30 Cep	30 Cep	20 Cep	19 Cep			

=== Encampment ===
The Encampment mansion corresponds to constellations Andromeda, Aquarius, Capricornus, Cassiopeia, Cepheus, Cygnus, Lacerta, Pegasus, Pisces and Piscis Austrinus.

Asterism	1	2	3	4	5	6	7	8	9	10	11	12	13	14	15	16	17	18	19	20	21	22	23	24	25	26	27	28	29	30	31	32	33	34	35	36	37	38	39	40	41	42	43	44	45	Note
室宿 (Shì Xiù, Encampment Mansion)	α Peg (Markab)	β Peg (Scheat)																																												
離宮 (Lí Gōng, Resting Palace)	λ Peg (Ligong)	μ Peg (Sadalbari)	ο Peg	η Peg (Matar)	τ Peg (Salm)	υ Peg (Alkarab)																																								
螣蛇 (Téng Shé, Flying Serpent)	α Lac (Stellio)	4 Lac	π2 Cyg	π1 Cyg (Azelfafage)	Unclear	Unclear	HIP 106886	13 Cep	ε Cep	β Lac (Alsamaka)	σ Cas	ρ Cas	τ Cas	AR Cas	9 Lac	3 And	7 And (Honores)	8 And	λ And (Udkadua)	ψ And	κ And (Kaffalmusalsala)	ι And (Rasalnaqa)																								
雷電 (Léi Diàn, Thunder and Lightning)	ζ Peg (Homam)	ξ Peg (Tugongli)	σ Peg	55 Peg	66 Peg	70 Peg																																								
土公吏 (Tǔ Gōng Lì, Clerk for Earthworks)	31 Peg	36 Peg																																												
壘壁陣 (Lěi Bì Zhèn, Line of Ramparts)	κ Cap	ε Cap	γ Cap (Nashira)	δ Cap (Deneb Algedi)	ι Aqr	θ Aqr (Ancha)	λ Aqr (Shatabhisha)	φ Aqr	27 Psc	29 Psc	33 Psc	30 Psc																																		
羽林軍 (Yǔ Lín Jūn, Palace Guard)	29 Aqr	35 Aqr	41 Aqr	47 Aqr	49 Aqr	λ PsA	HIP 110641	ε PsA	21 PsA	20 PsA	υ Aqr	68 Aqr	66 Aqr	51 Aqr	53 Aqr	56 Aqr	50 Aqr	45 Aqr	58 Aqr	64 Aqr	65 Aqr	70 Aqr	74 Aqr	τ2 Aqr (Lintangkumba)	τ1 Aqr	δ Aqr (Skat)	77 Aqr	78 Aqr	89 Aqr	86 Aqr	101 Aqr	100 Aqr	99 Aqr	98 Aqr	97 Aqr	94 Aqr	ψ3 Aqr	ψ2 Aqr	ψ1 Aqr	87 Aqr	85 Aqr	83 Aqr	χ Aqr	ω1 Aqr	ω2 Aqr	
天綱 (Tiān Gāng, Celestial Headrope)	δ PsA																																													
北落師門 (Běi Luò Shī Mén, North Gate of the Military Camp)	α PsA (Fomalhaut)																																													
鈇鉞 (Fū Yuè, Axe)	103 Aqr	106 Aqr	108 Aqr																																											
八魁 (Bā Kuí, Net [for Catching Birds])	6 Cet	2 Cet (Hydor)	1 Cet	3 Cet	9 Cet	7 Cet																																								

Added Stars

Asterism	+1	+2	+3	+4	+5	+6	+7	+8	+9	+10	+11	+12	+13	+14	+15	+16	+17	+18	+19	Note
室宿 (Shì Xiù, Encampment Mansion)	51 Peg (Helvetios)	56 Peg	60 Peg	61 Peg	63 Peg	64 Peg	67 Peg													
離宮 (Lí Gōng, Resting Palace)	33 Peg	39 Peg	40 Peg	41 Peg	45 Peg	65 Peg	71 Peg	69 Peg												
螣蛇 (Téng Shé, Flying Serpent)	HIP 102431	5 And	11 And	4 And	13 And	10 And	9 And	12 And	14 And (Veritate)	15 And	22 And	18 And	1 Cas	4 Cas	2 Cas	2 Cas	HIP 115171	V1022 Cas	22 And	
雷電 (Léi Diàn, Thunder and Lightning)	52 Peg	ρ Peg (Leidian)	57 Peg	59 Peg	58 Peg	66 Peg	75 Peg	76 Peg												
壘壁陣 (Lěi Bì Zhèn, Line of Ramparts)	54 Aqr	67 Aqr	78 Aqr	20 Psc	24 Psc	4 Cet	5 Cet	HIP 106768												
鈇鉞 (Fū Yuè, Axe)	104 Aqr	107 Aqr	104 Aqr																	

=== Wall ===
The Wall mansion corresponds to constellations Andromeda, Cetus, Pegasus and Pisces.

Asterism	1	2	3	4	5	Note
壁宿 (Bì Xiù, Wall Mansion)	γ Peg (Algenib)	α And (Alpheratz)				
天廄 (Tiān Jiù, Celestial Stable)	θ And	ρ And	σ And			
土公 (Tǔ Gōng, Official for Earthworks)	32 Psc	45 Psc				
霹靂 (Pī Lì, Thunderbolt)	β Psc (Fumalsamakah)	γ Psc (Yunyu)	θ Psc	ι Psc (Puwuh Atarung)	ω Psc (Pili)	
雲雨 (Yún Yǔ, Cloud and Rain)	κ Psc	12 Psc	21 Psc	λ Psc		
鈇鑕 (Fū Zhì, Sickle)	48 Cet	Unclear	Unclear	υ Cet (Alnaamaat)	56 Cet	

Added Stars

Asterism	+1	+2	+3	+4	+5	+6	+7	+8	+9	+10	+11	+12	+13	+14	+15	+16	+17	+18	+19	+20	+21	+22	+23	Note
壁宿 (Bì Xiù, Wall Mansion)	73 Peg	72 Peg	78 Peg	79 Peg	85 Peg	ψ Peg	83 Peg	HIP 117710	φ Peg	86 Peg	37 Psc	42 Psc	43 Psc	49 Psc	48 Psc	40 Psc	39 Psc	87 Peg	χ Peg	47 Psc	46 Psc	52 Psc	52 Psc	
天廄 (Tiān Jiù, Celestial Stable)	23 And																							
土公 (Tǔ Gōng, Official for Earthworks)	31 Psc	34 Psc	35 Psc	36 Psc	41 Psc	51 Psc	44 Psc	10 Cet	11 Cet	14 Cet	15 Cet													
霹靂 (Pī Lì, Thunderbolt)	3 Psc	2 Psc	5 Psc	7 Psc	77 Peg	82 Peg	80 Peg	26 Psc	Unclear															
雲雨 (Yún Yǔ, Cloud and Rain)	11 Psc	14 Psc	13 Psc	9 Psc	15 Psc	16 Psc	19 Psc	22 Psc	25 Psc	21 Psc														

== White Tiger ==
=== Legs ===
The Legs mansion represents the tail of White Tiger. It corresponds to constellations Andromeda, Cassiopeia, Cetus, Pisces and Triangulum.

Asterism	1	2	3	4	5	6	7	8	9	10	11	12	13	14	15	16	Note
奎宿 (Kuí Xiù, Legs Mansion)	η And (Kui)	ζ And (Shimu)	65 Psc	ε And (Anunitu)	δ And (Kuda)	π And	ν And	μ And	β And (Mirach)	σ Psc	τ Psc	91 Psc	υ Psc	φ Psc	χ Psc	ψ1 Psc	
王良 (Wáng Liáng, Wang Liang)	β Cas (Caph)	κ Cas (Cexing)	η Cas (Achird)	α Cas (Schedar)	λ Cas												
策 (Cè, Whip)	γ Cas (Tiansi)																
附路 (Fù Lù, Auxiliary Road)	ζ Cas (Fulu)																
軍南門 (Jūn Nán Mén, Southern Military Gate)	φ And (Junnanmen)																
閣道 (Gé Dào, Flying Corridor)	ι Cas (Huagai)	ε Cas (Segin)	δ Cas (Ruchbah)	μ Cas (Note: Some sources identify this star with θ Cas.)	ν Cas	ο Cas											
外屏 (Wài Píng, Outer Screen)	δ Psc (Waiping)	ε Psc	ζ Psc (Revati)	μ Psc	ν Psc	ξ Psc	α Psc (Alrescha)										
天溷 (Tiān Hùn, Celestial Pigsty)	21 Cet	φ3 Cet	18 Cet	φ1 Cet													
土司空 (Tǔ Sī Kōng, Master of Constructions)	β Cet (Diphda)																

Added Stars

Asterism	+1	+2	+3	+4	+5	+6	+7	+8	+9	+10	+11	+12	+13	+14	+15	+16	+17	+18	+19	+20	+21	+22	+23	Note
奎宿 (Kuí Xiù, Legs Mansion)	28 And	55 Psc	54 Psc	59 Psc	64 Psc	66 Psc	ψ3 Psc	ψ2 Psc	36 And	67 Psc	68 Psc	1 Tri	82 Psc	78 Psc	σ Psc	45 And	47 And	44 And	41 And	39 And	M31 (Andromeda Galaxy)	32 And	υ Psc	
王良 (Wáng Liáng, Wang Liang)	6 Cas	10 Cas	9 Cas	12 Cas	υ2 Cas (Castula)	HIP 116687	HIP 116962	HIP 117472	HIP 43	HIP 124	HIP 1354	HIP 1982	HIP 2854	HIP 4151										
閣道 (Gé Dào, Flying Corridor)	π Cas	ξ Cas	φ Cas	χ Cas	44 Cas																			
外屏 (Wài Píng, Outer Screen)	72 Psc	75 Psc	88 Psc (Buranun)	80 Psc	77 Psc	73 Psc	70 Psc	62 Psc	60 Psc	26 Cet	29 Cet	33 Cet	35 Cet	89 Psc	112 Psc (Zibbatu)									
天溷 (Tiān Hùn, Celestial Pigsty)	12 Cet	13 Cet	20 Cet (Tianhun)	25 Cet	φ4 Cet	φ2 Cet																		

=== Bond ===
The Bond mansion represents the body of White Tiger. It corresponds to constellations Andromeda, Aries, Cetus, Fornax, Perseus, Pisces and Triangulum.

Asterism	1	2	3	4	5	6	7	8	9	10	11	Note
婁宿 (Lóu Xiù, Bond Mansion)	β Ari (Sheratan)	γ Ari (Mesarthim)	α Ari (Hamal)									
天大將軍 (Tiān Dà Jiāng Jūn, Great General of the Heaven)	γ And (Almach)	φ Per (Dajiangjunbei)	51 And (Nembus)	49 And	χ And	υ And (Titawin)	τ And	56 And	β Tri (Alaybasan)	γ Tri (Apdu)	δ Tri (Deltoton)	
右更 (Yòu Gēng, Official in Charge of Pasturing)	ρ Psc	η Psc (Alpherg)	π Psc (Idigna)	ο Psc (Torcular)	104 Psc							
左更 (Zuǒ Gēng, Official in Charge of Forest)	ν Ari	μ Ari	ο Ari	σ Ari	π Ari							
天倉 (Tiān Cāng, Square Celestial Granary)	ι Cet	η Cet (Gajahmina)	θ Cet (Tiancang)	ζ Cet (Baten Kaitos)	τ Cet	57 Cet						
天庾 (Tiān Yǔ, Ricks of Grain)	ν For	ω For	β For									

Added Stars

Asterism	+1	+2	+3	+4	+5	+6	+7	+8	+9	+10	+11	+12	+13	+14	+15	+16	+17	+18	+19	+20	+21	Note
婁宿 (Lóu Xiù, Bond Mansion)	ι Ari	VY Psc	107 Psc	Unclear	λ Ari	α Tri (Mothallah)	10 Ari	11 Ari	14 Ari	20 Ari	κ Ari	η Ari (Zuogeng)	θ Ari	15 Ari	19 Ari							
天大將軍 (Tiān Dà Jiāng Jūn, Great General of the Heaven)	ξ And (Adhil)	ξ And (Adhil)	ω And	τ And	ε Τri	ι Τri (Triminus)	7 Τri	14 Τri	58 And	59 And	55 And	60 And	62 And	HIP 10830	3 Per	2 Per	14 Per					
右更 (Yòu Gēng, Official in Charge of Pasturing)	94 Psc	101 Psc	HIP 8588	100 Psc	HIP 6451																	
左更 (Zuǒ Gēng, Official in Charge of Forest)	26 Ari	40 Ari	44 Ari	ρ3 Ari	45 Ari	47 Ari	ε Ari	HIP 13448														
天倉 (Tiān Cāng, Square Celestial Granary)	43 Cet	42 Cet	38 Cet	34 Cet	40 Cet	39 Cet	44 Cet	41 Cet	37 Cet	36 Cet	32 Cet	30 Cet	28 Cet	27 Cet	46 Cet	47 Cet	50 Cet	49 Cet	HIP 1499	HIP 7999	χ Cet A	
天庾 (Tiān Yǔ, Ricks of Grain)	Unclear	Unclear	Unclear																			

=== Stomach ===
The Stomach mansion represents the body of White Tiger. It corresponds to constellations Aries, Camelopardalis, Cetus, Eridanus, Perseus, Taurus and Triangulum.

Asterism	1	2	3	4	5	6	7	8	9	10	11	12	13	Note
胃宿 (Wèi Xiù, Stomach Mansion)	35 Ari (Weixiu)	39 Ari (Lilii Borea)	41 Ari (Bharani)											
大陵 (Dà Líng, Mausoleum)	i Per	τ Per	ι Per	κ Per (Misam)	β Per (Algol)	ρ Per (Gorgonea Tertia)	16 Per	12 Per						
積屍 (Jī Shī, Heaps of Corpses)	π Per (Gorgonea Secunda)													
天船 (Tiān Chuán, Celestial Boat)	η Per (Miram)	γ Per	α Per (Mirfak)	ψ Per	δ Per (Sarvvis)	48 Per	51 Per	HIP 20156	HIP 19949					
積水 (Jī Shuǐ, Stored Water)	λ Per													
天廩 (Tiān Lǐn, Celestial Foodstuffs)	5 Tau	4 Tau	ξ Tau	ο Tau										
天囷 (Tiān Qūn, Circular Celestial Granary)	α Cet (Menkar)	97 Cet	λ Cet	μ Cet	ξ1 Cet (Bawy)	ξ2 Cet	ν Cet	γ Cet (Kaffaljidhma)	δ Cet (Sawyqed)	75 Cet	70 Cet	63 Cet	66 Cet	

Added Stars

Asterism	+1	+2	+3	+4	+5	+6	+7	+8	+9	+10	+11	+12	+13	+14	+15	+16	+17	+18	+19	+20	+21	Note
胃宿 (Wèi Xiù, Stomach Mansion)	10 Tri	12 Tri	21 Per	52 Ari	33 Ari																	
大陵 (Dà Líng, Mausoleum)	7 Per	8 Per	5 Per	1 Per	4 Per	6 Per	63 And	64 And	65 And	66 And	τ Per	Unclear	θ Per	14 Per	20 Per	17 Per	HIP 14066	ω Per (Gorgonea Quarta)	32 Per	30 Per	ω Per (Gorgonea Quarta)	
天船 (Tiān Chuán, Celestial Boat)	29 Per	31 Per	34 Per	σ Per	36 Per	53 Per	3 Cam	2 Cam	1 Cam	b Per												
積水 (Jī Shuǐ, Stored Water)	43 Per																					
天廩 (Tiān Lǐn, Celestial Foodstuffs)	6 Tau	29 Tau	4 Tau																			
天囷 (Tiān Qūn, Circular Celestial Granary)	62 Cet	58 Cet	61 Cet	60 Cet	69 Cet	64 Cet	ξ Ari	31 Ari	85 Cet	93 Cet	κ1 Cet	12 Tau	25 Eri	24 Eri	10 Tau	95 Cet	94 Cet	7 Eri	5 Eri	84 Cet	V711 Tau	

=== Hairy Head ===
The Hairy Head mansion represents the body of White Tiger. It corresponds to constellations Aries, Cetus, Eridanus, Fornax, Perseus and Taurus.

Asterism	1	2	3	4	5	6	7	8	9	10	11	12	13	14	15	16	Note
昴宿 (Mǎo Xiù, Hairy Head Mansion)	17 Tau (Electra)	19 Tau (Taygeta)	21 Tau (Asterope)	20 Tau (Maia)	23 Tau (Merope)	η Tau (Alcyone)	27 Tau (Atlas)										
天阿 (Tiān Ē, Celestial River (Note: The same as "天河".))	62 Ari																
月 (Yuè, Moon)	37 Tau																
捲舌 (Juǎn Shé, Rolled Tongue)	ν Per	ε Per (Áldu)	ξ Per (Menkib)	ζ Per	ο Per (Atik)	40 Per											
天讒 (Tiān Chán, Celestial Slander)	42 Per																
礪石 (Lì Shí, Whetstone)	ψ Tau	44 Tau	χ Tau	φ Tau													
天陰 (Tiān Yīn, Celestial Yin Force)	τ2 Ari	ζ Ari	τ1 Ari	δ Ari (Botein)	65 Ari												
芻蒿 (Chú Hāo, Hay)	ρ Cet	77 Cet	67 Cet	71 Cet	Unclear	ε Cet											
天苑 (Tiān Yuàn, Celestial Meadows)	γ Eri (Zaurak)	π Eri	δ Eri (Rana)	ε Eri (Ran)	ζ Eri (Zibal)	η Eri (Azha)	π Cet	τ1 Eri	τ2 Eri (Angetenar)	τ3 Eri	τ4 Eri	τ5 Eri	τ6 Eri	τ7 Eri	τ8 Eri	τ9 Eri	

Added Stars

Asterism	+1	+2	+3	+4	+5	+6	+7	+8	+9	+10	+11	+12	+13	+14	+15	+16	+17	+18	Note
昴宿 (Mǎo Xiù, Hairy Head Mansion)	11 Tau	7 Tau	9 Tau	Unclear	32 Tau	Unclear	Unclear	18 Tau	16 Tau (Celaeno)	24 Tau	26 Tau	28 Tau (Pleione)	HIP 17900						
月 (Yuè, Moon)	39 Tau																		
捲舌 (Juǎn Shé, Rolled Tongue)	IX Per	55 Per	54 Per	49 Per	50 Per	52 Per	o Per (Atik)												
天陰 (Tiān Yīn, Celestial Yin Force)	54 Ari	64 Ari	13 Tau	14 Tau	HIP 14649	δ Ari (Botein)													
芻蒿 (Chú Hāo, Hay)	HIP 10215	ο Cet (Mira)	79 Cet	81 Cet	80 Cet														
天苑 (Tiān Yuàn, Celestial Meadows)	20 Eri	15 Eri	α For (Dalim)	α For (Dalim)	6 Eri	4 Eri	HIP 11287	τ1 Eri	σ Cet	ρ1 Eri	ρ2 Eri	ρ3 Eri	14 Eri	17 Eri	21 Eri	22 Eri	α For (Dalim)	HIP 16677	

=== Net ===
The Net mansion represents the body of White Tiger. It corresponds to constellations Auriga, Eridanus, Horologium, Lepus, Orion, Perseus and Taurus.

Asterism	1	2	3	4	5	6	7	8	9	10	11	12	13	Note
畢宿 (Bì Xiù, Net Mansion)	ε Tau (Ain)	δ3 Tau	δ1 Tau (Secunda Hyadum)	γ Tau (Prima Hyadum)	α Tau (Aldebaran)	θ2 Tau (Chamukuy)	71 Tau	λ Tau (Bibing)						
附耳 (Fù Ěr, Whisper)	σ2 Tau													
天街 (Tiān Jiē, Celestial Street)	κ1 Tau	ω Tau												
天高 (Tiān Gāo, Celestial High Terrace)	ι Tau	97 Tau (Lembu)	107 Tau	109 Tau										
諸王 (Zhū Wáng, Feudal Kings)	136 Tau	125 Tau	118 Tau	103 Tau	99 Tau	τ Tau (Gaja)								
五車 (Wǔ Chē, Five Chariots)	ι Aur (Hassaleh)	α Aur (Capella)	β Aur (Menkalinan)	θ Aur (Mahasim)	β Tau (Elnath)									
柱 (Zhù, Pillars)	ε Aur (Almaaz)	ζ Aur (Saclateni)	η Aur (Haedus)	υ Aur	ν Aur	τ Aur	χ Aur	26 Aur	Unclear					
咸池 (Xián Chí, Pool of Harmony)	ρ Aur	HIP 25810	λ Aur (Alhurr)											
天潢 (Tiān Huáng, Celestial Pond)	19 Aur	φ Aur	14 Aur	σ Aur	μ Aur									
天關 (Tiān Guān, Celestial Gate)	ζ Tau (Tianguan)													
天節 (Tiān Jié, Celestial Tally)	π Tau	ρ Tau	57 Tau	79 Tau	90 Tau	93 Tau	88 Tau	66 Tau						
九州殊口 (Jiǔ Zhōu Shū Kǒu, Interpreters of Nine Dialects)	39 Eri	ο1 Eri (Beid)	ξ Eri	ν Eri	56 Eri	55 Eri								
參旗 (Shēn Qí, Banner of Three Stars)	ο1 Ori	ο2 Ori	6 Ori	π1 Ori	π2 Ori	π3 Ori (Tabit)	π4 Ori	π5 Ori	π6 Ori					
九斿 (Jiǔ Yóu, Imperial Military Flag)	49 Eri	μ Eri	ω Eri	63 Eri	64 Eri	60 Eri	58 Eri	54 Eri	1 Lep					
天園 (Tiān Yuán, Celestial Orchard)	δ Phe	χ Eri	φ Eri	κ Eri	s Eri	θ Eri (Acamar)	h Eri	f Eri	g Eri	υ4 Eri	υ3 Eri (Beemim)	υ2 Eri (Theemin)	υ1 Eri	

Added Stars

Asterism	+1	+2	+3	+4	+5	+6	+7	+8	+9	+10	+11	+12	+13	+14	+15	+16	+17	+18	+19	Note
畢宿 (Bì Xiù, Net Mansion)	30 Tau	31 Tau	ν Tau	40 Tau	45 Tau	46 Tau	μ Tau	47 Tau	48 Tau	58 Tau	63 Tau	64 Tau	θ1 Tau	46 Tau	HIP 21029	HIP 21053	85 Tau			
附耳 (Fù Ěr, Whisper)	σ1 Tau	89 Tau	89 Tau	σ2 Tau																
天街 (Tiān Jiē, Celestial Street)	43 Tau	κ1 Tau	υ Tau	72 Tau																
天高 (Tiān Gāo, Celestial High Terrace)	104 Tau	106 Tau	105 Tau	114 Tau																
諸王 (Zhū Wáng, Feudal Kings)	95 Tau	98 Tau	121 Tau	132 Tau																
五車 (Wǔ Chē, Five Chariots)	59 Per	57 Per	58 Per	6 Aur	5 Aur	ω Aur	1 Aur	2 Aur	40 Aur	38 Aur	39 Aur	43 Aur	42 Aur	41 Aur	36 Aur	π Aur	ο Aur	12 Aur	HIP 21238	
天潢 (Tiān Huáng, Celestial Pond)	16 Aur	17 Aur																		
天關 (Tiān Guān, Celestial Gate)	113 Tau	126 Tau	128 Tau	129 Tau	130 Tau	127 Tau														
九州殊口 (Jiǔ Zhōu Shū Kǒu, Interpreters of Nine Dialects)	35 Eri	32 Eri	29 Eri	30 Eri	30 Eri	37 Eri	ο2 Eri (Keid)	47 Eri	46 Eri	51 Eri	ο2 Eri (Keid)									
參旗 (Shēn Qí, Banner of Three Stars)	96 Tau	HIP 23043	101 Tau	11 Ori	15 Ori	18 Ori	16 Ori	13 Ori	13 Ori	14 Ori	5 Ori	π5 Ori								
九斿 (Jiǔ Yóu, Imperial Military Flag)	HIP 20884	45 Eri	62 Eri	53 Eri (Sceptrum)	59 Eri	HIP 21685	HIP 23554													
天園 (Tiān Yuán, Celestial Orchard)	ι Eri	Unclear	e Eri	y Eri	i Eri	α Hor														

=== Turtle Beak ===
The Turtle Beak mansion represents the head of White Tiger. It corresponds to constellations Auriga, Gemini, Lynx, Orion and Taurus.

Asterism	1	2	3	4	5	6	7	8	9	Note
觜宿 (Zī Xiù, Turtle Beak Mansion)	λ Ori (Meissa)	φ1 Ori	φ2 Ori							
司怪 (Sī Guài, Deity in Charge of Monsters)	139 Tau	1 Gem	χ2 Ori	χ1 Ori						
座旗 (Zuò Qí, Seat Flags)	ψ6 Aur	ψ10 Aur	ψ4 Aur	ψ5 Aur	ψ2 Aur	ψ7 Aur	ψ3 Aur	51 Aur	59 Aur	

Added Stars

Asterism	+1	+2	+3	+4	+5	+6	+7	+8	+9	+10	+11	Note
司怪 (Sī Guài, Deity in Charge of Monsters)	140 Tau	HIP 28561	57 Ori	64 Ori	68 Ori	71 Ori						
座旗 (Zuò Qí, Seat Flags)	ψ1 Aur	47 Aur	60 Aur	ψ8 Aur	62 Aur	63 Aur	64 Aur	66 Aur	21 Lyn	22 Lyn	20 Lyn	

=== Three Stars ===
The Three Stars mansion represents the body of White Tiger. It corresponds to constellations Columba, Eridanus, Lepus, Monoceros and Orion.

Asterism	1	2	3	4	5	6	7	Note
參宿 (Shēn Xiù, Three Stars Mansion)	ζ Ori (Alnitak)	ε Ori (Alnilam)	δ Ori (Mintaka)	α Ori (Betelgeuse)	γ Ori (Bellatrix)	κ Ori (Saiph)	β Ori (Rigel)	
伐 (Fá, Punishment)	42 Ori	θ2 Ori	ι Ori (Hatysa)					
玉井 (Yù Jǐng, Jade Well)	λ Eri	ψ Eri	β Eri (Cursa)	τ Ori				
軍井 (Jūn Jǐng, Military Well)	ι Lep	κ Lep	λ Lep	ν Lep				
屏 (Píng, Screen)	μ Lep (Bade)	ε Lep (Ping)						
廁 (Cè, Toilet)	α Lep (Arneb)	β Lep (Nihal)	γ Lep	δ Lep				
屎 (Shǐ, Excrement)	μ Col							

Added Stars

Asterism	+1	+2	+3	+4	+5	+6	+7	+8	+9	+10	+11	+12	+13	+14	+15	+16	+17	+18	+19	+20	+21	+22	+23	+24	+25	+26	+27	+28	+29	+30	+31	+32	+33	+34	+35	+36	+37	+38	+39	Note
參宿 (Shēn Xiù, Three Stars Mansion)	σ Ori	31 Ori	η Ori (Algjebba)	27 Ori	22 Ori	25 Ori	25 Ori	21 Ori	ρ Ori	23 Ori	ψ Ori	33 Ori	32 Ori	38 Ori	ω Ori	51 Ori	52 Ori	μ Ori	63 Ori	66 Ori	59 Ori	56 Ori	HIP 28413	9 Mon	10 Mon	β Mon	7 Mon	γ Mon	6 Mon	4 Mon	3 Mon	2 Mon	1 Mon	55 Ori	49 Ori	υ Ori (Thabit)	29 Ori	τ Ori	HIP 25028	
伐 (Fá, Punishment)	45 Ori	θ1 Ori (Trapezium)																																						
玉井 (Yù Jǐng, Jade Well)	66 Eri	68 Eri	HIP 23802																																					
軍井 (Jūn Jǐng, Military Well)	8 Lep	RX Lep																																						
屏 (Píng, Screen)	μ Lep (Bade)	ε Lep (Ping)																																						
廁 (Cè, Toilet)	10 Lep	12 Lep	19 Lep	17 Lep	θ Lep	η Lep	ζ Lep (Darlugal)	12 Lep																																

== Vermilion Bird ==
The final seven mansions represents the Vermilion Bird, creature of the direction south and the element Fire.

=== Well ===
The Well Mansion corresponds to constellations Auriga, Cancer, Canis Major, Canis Minor, Carina, Columba, Gemini, Monoceros, Orion, Pictor, Puppis and Taurus.

Asterism	1	2	3	4	5	6	7	8	9	Note
井宿 (Jǐng Xiù, Well Mansion)	μ Gem (Tejat)	ν Gem	γ Gem (Alhena)	ξ Gem (Alzirr)	ε Gem (Mebsuta)	36 Gem	ζ Gem (Mekbuda)	λ Gem		
鉞 (Yuè, Battle Axe)	η Gem (Propus)									
水府 (Shuǐ Fǔ, Official for Irrigation)	ν Ori	ξ Ori	72 Ori	69 Ori						
天樽 (Tiān Zūn, Celestial Wine Cup)	57 Gem	δ Gem (Wasat)	ω Gem							
五諸侯 (Wǔ Zhū Hóu, Five Feudal Kings)	θ Gem	τ Gem	ι Gem	υ Gem	φ Gem					
北河 (Běi Hé, North River)	ρ Gem	α Gem (Castor)	β Gem (Pollux)							
積水 (Jī Shǔi, Accumulated Water)	ο Gem (Jishui)									
積薪 (Jī Xīn, Pile of Firewood)	κ Gem									
水位 (Shǔi Wèi, Water Level)	6 CMi	11 CMi	8 Cnc	ζ Cnc (Tegmine)						
南河 (Nán Hé, South River)	ε CMi	β CMi (Gomeisa)	α CMi (Procyon)							
四瀆 (Sì Dú, Four Great Rivers)	HIP 34033	17 Mon	13 Mon	ε Mon						
闕丘 (Què Qiū, Palace Gate)	18 Mon	21 Mon								
軍市 (Jūn Shì, Market for the Soldiers)	β CMa (Mirzam)	ν3 CMa	15 CMa	17 CMa	ο1 CMa	ξ1 CMa				
野雞 (Yě Jī, Wild Cockerel)	ν2 CMa									
天狼 (Tiān Láng, Celestial Wolf)	α CMa (Sirius)									
丈人 (Zhàng Rén, Grandfather)	α Col (Phact)	ε Col								
子 (Zǐ, Son)	λ Col (Tsze)	β Col (Wazn)								
孫 (Sūn, Grandson)	κ Col	θ Col (Elkurud)								
老人 (Lǎo Rén, Old Man)	α Car (Canopus)									
弧矢 (Hú Shǐ, Bow and Arrow)	δ CMa (Wezen)	η CMa (Aludra)	c Pup	χ Pup	ο Pup	k Pup	ε CMa (Adhara)	κ CMa	π Pup	

Added Stars

Asterism	+1	+2	+3	+4	+5	+6	+7	+8	+9	+10	+11	+12	+13	+14	+15	+16	+17	+18	+19	+20	+21	+22	+23	+24	+25	+26	+27	+28	+29	+30	+31	+32	Note
井宿 (Jǐng Xiù, Well Mansion)	κ Aur	48 Aur	53 Aur	28 Gem	54 Aur	49 Aur	26 Gem	23 Gem	W Gem	30 Gem	32 Gem	35 Gem	38 Gem	41 Gem	45 Gem	HIP 34858	51 Gem	30 Gem	ξ Gem (Alzirr)														
鉞 (Yuè, Battle Axe)	9 Gem																																
水府 (Shuǐ Fǔ, Official for Irrigation)	133 Tau	131 Tau	135 Tau	137 Tau	137 Tau	73 Ori	74 Ori	75 Ori																									
天樽 (Tiān Zūn, Celestial Wine Cup)	37 Gem	40 Gem	47 Gem	52 Gem	58 Gem	44 Gem	56 Gem	61 Gem	63 Gem																								
五諸侯 (Wǔ Zhū Hóu, Five Feudal Kings)	59 Gem	64 Gem	65 Gem	64 Gem	65 Gem	τ Gem																											
北河 (Běi Hé, North River)	70 Gem	ο Gem (Jishui)	π Gem	σ Gem																													
積薪 (Jī Xīn, Pile of Firewood)	76 Gem	82 Gem	84 Gem																														
水位 (Shǔi Wèi, Water Level)	1 CMi	68 Gem	74 Gem	81 Gem	85 Gem	μ Cnc	3 Cnc	5 Cnc	1 Cnc	Unclear	12 Cnc	HIP 36631																					
南河 (Nán Hé, South River)	γ CMi	η CMi	δ3 CMi	δ2 CMi	δ1 CMi	ζ CMi	14 CMi	HIP 39311	28 Mon	27 Mon	HD 61563																						
四瀆 (Sì Dú, Four Great Rivers)	HIP 34033	15 Mon	16 Mon	12 Mon	Unclear	HIP 30717	HIP 30720	HIP 31149	14 Mon																								
闕丘 (Què Qiū, Palace Gate)	24 Mon	23 Mon	δ Mon	19 Mon	20 Mon	25 Mon	α Mon																										
軍市 (Jūn Shì, Market for the Soldiers)	ν1 CMa	ξ2 CMa	12 CMa	π CMa	ο2 CMa	π CMa	π CMa																										
天狼 (Tiān Láng, Celestial Wolf)	11 CMa	θ CMa	μ CMa	γ CMa (Muliphein)	ι CMa	θ CMa																											
子 (Zǐ, Son)	γ Col																																
孫 (Sūn, Grandson)	ζ CMa (Furud)	λ CMa	δ Col	δ Col																													
老人 (Lǎo Rén, Old Man)	τ Pup	ν Pup (Pipit)	η Col	β Pic																													
弧矢 (Hú Shǐ, Bow and Arrow)	10 CMa	σ CMa (Unurgunite)	ω CMa	27 CMa	26 CMa	τ CMa	29 CMa	2 Pup	4 Pup	5 Pup	10 Pup	6 Pup	16 Pup	14 Pup	11 Pup	12 Pup	ξ Pup (Azmidi)	HIP 37590	3 Pup	HD 61831	b Pup	ζ Pup (Naos)	HD 64440	σ Pup	FV CMa	LZ CMa	HIP 36848	HIP 36787	HIP 37951	HIP 37915	12 Pup	ρ Pup (Tureis)	

=== Ghosts ===
The Ghosts Mansion corresponds to constellations Cancer, Gemini, Hydra, Monoceros, Puppis, Pyxis and Vela.

Asterism	1	2	3	4	5	6	7	Note
鬼宿 (Guǐ Xiù, Ghosts Mansion)	θ Cnc	η Cnc	γ Cnc (Asellus Borealis)	δ Cnc (Asellus Australis)				
積屍 (Jī Shī, Cumulative Corpses)	M44 (Beehive Cluster)							
爟 (Guàn, Beacon Fire)	ψ Cnc	λ Cnc (Piautos)	φ1 Cnc	15 Cnc				
外廚 (Wài Chú, Outer Kitchen)	2 Hya	F Hya	14 Hya	Unclear	Unclear	Unclear		
天記 (Tiān Jì, Judge to Estimate the Age of Animals)	λ Vel (Suhail)							
天狗 (Tiān Gǒu, Celestial Dog)	e Vel	d Vel	Unclear	β Pyx	α Pyx	γ Pyx	δ Pyx	
天社 (Tiān Shè, Celestial Earth God's Temple)	γ Vel (Regor)	b Vel	δ Vel (Alsephina)	φ Vel (Tseen Ke)	κ Vel (Markeb)	N Vel		

Added Stars

Asterism	+1	+2	+3	+4	+5	+6	+7	+8	+9	+10	+11	+12	+13	+14	+15	+16	+17	+18	+19	Note
鬼宿 (Guǐ Xiù, Ghosts Mansion)	35 Cnc	20 Cnc	25 Cnc	29 Cnc	27 Cnc	45 Cnc	50 Cnc	54 Cnc	52 Cnc	ο1 Cnc	ο2 Cnc	68 Cnc	71 Cnc	78 Cnc	83 Cnc	π Cnc	Unclear	Unclear	25 Cnc	
積屍 (Jī Shī, Cumulative Corpses)	39 Cnc	42 Cnc	ε Cnc (Meleph)																	
爟 (Guàn, Beacon Fire)	4 Cnc	ω Cnc	χ Gem	11 Cnc	13 Cnc	χ Cnc	φ1 Cnc	φ2 Cnc	24 Cnc	28 Cnc	υ1 Cnc									
外廚 (Wài Chú, Outer Kitchen)	ζ Mon	1 Hya	c Hya	3 Hya	F Hya	15 Hya	17 Hya	6 Hya	12 Hya	9 Hya	21 Pup	Unclear	20 Pup	18 Pup	HIP 40205	19 Pup	22 Pup			
天記 (Tiān Jì, Judge to Estimate the Age of Animals)	ψ Vel	q Vel																		
天社 (Tiān Shè, Celestial Earth God's Temple)	χ Car	a Vel	c Vel	ο Vel	Unclear															

=== Willow ===
The Willow Mansion corresponds to constellations Cancer, Hydra and Leo.

Asterism	1	2	3	4	5	6	7	8	Note
柳宿 (Liǔ Xiù, Willow Mansion)	δ Hya	σ Hya (Minchir)	η Hya	ρ Hya	ε Hya (Ashlesha)	ζ Hya	ω Hya	θ Hya	
酒旗 (Jiǔ Qí, Banner of Wine Shop)	ψ Leo	ξ Leo	ω Leo						

Added Stars

Asterism	+1	+2	+3	+4	+5	+6	+7	+8	+9	+10	+11	+12	+13	Note
柳宿 (Liǔ Xiù, Willow Mansion)	10 Hya	κ Cnc	α Cnc (Acubens)	60 Cnc	49 Cnc	37 Cnc	36 Cnc	34 Cnc	21 Cnc	β Cnc (Tarf)	HIP 40617	60 Cnc	α Cnc (Acubens)	
酒旗 (Jiǔ Qí, Banner of Wine Shop)	8 Leo	7 Leo	11 Leo	6 Leo	3 Leo									

=== Star ===
The Star Mansion corresponds to constellations Cancer, Hydra, Leo, Leo Minor, Lynx, Sextans.

Asterism	1	2	3	4	5	6	7	8	9	10	11	12	13	14	15	16	17	Note
星宿 (Xīng Xiù, Star Mansion)	α Hya (Alphard)	τ1 Hya	τ2 Hya	ι Hya (Ukdah)	27 Hya	26 Hya	HIP 46744											
天相 (Tiān Xiàng, Celestial Premier)	17 Sex	α Sex	ε Sex															
天稷 (Tiān Jì, Celestial Cereals)																		Not documented in Yixiang Kaocheng
軒轅 (Xuānyuán, Xuanyuan)	10 UMa	HIP 44700	38 Lyn	α Lyn	HIP 47617	f Leo	κ Leo (Al Minliar al Asad)	λ Leo (Alterf)	ε Leo (Algenubi)	μ Leo (Rasalas)	ζ Leo (Adhafera)	γ Leo (Algieba)	η Leo	α Leo (Regulus)	ο Leo (Subra)	ρ Leo (Shaomin)	31 Leo (Yunü) (also 御女 (Yù Nǚ, Maids-in-waiting)	
內平 (Nèi Píng, High Judge)	22 LMi	21 LMi	13 LMi	HIP 48742														

Added Stars

Asterism	+1	+2	+3	+4	+5	+6	+7	+8	+9	+10	+11	+12	+13	+14	+15	+16	+17	+18	+19	+20	+21	+22	+23	+24	+25	+26	+27	+28	+29	+30	+31	+32	+33	+34	+35	+36	+37	+38	+39	+40	+41	+42	+43	+44	+45	+46	+47	=48	+49	+50	+51	+52	+53	+54	+55	+56	+57	+58	+59	Note
星宿 (Xīng Xiù, Star Mansion)	29 Hya	24 Hya	20 Hya	19 Hya	21 Hya	23 Hya	28 Hya	33 Hya	6 Sex	3 Sex	5 Sex	γ Sex	37 Hya	Unclear	34 Hya																																													
天相 (Tiān Xiàng, Celestial Premier)	18 Sex	21 Sex	20 Sex	25 Sex	27 Sex	δ Sex	Unclear	24 Sex	26 Sex	β Sex	33 Sex	40 Sex																																																
軒轅 (Xuānyuán, Xuanyuan)	8 LMi	7 LMi	HIP 45412	66 Cnc	σ3 Cnc	σ2 Cnc	σ1 Cnc	33 Lyn	HIP 42503	HIP 42472	46 Cnc	57 Cnc	61 Cnc	τ Cnc	75 Cnc	70 Cnc	67 Cnc	ρ2 Cnc	ρ1 Cnc (Copernicus)	ρ1 Cnc	53 Cnc	ι Cnc B	ν Cnc	ξ Cnc (Nahn)	HIP 46058	9 Leo	13 Leo	22 Leo	20 Leo	35 Leo	39 Leo	40 Leo	40 Leo	33 Leo	42 Leo	37 Leo	34 Leo	π Leo	HIP 48876	HIP 48734	Unclear	ν Leo	23 Leo	18 Leo	10 Leo	2 Sex	7 Sex	4 Sex	9 Sex	12 Sex	13 Sex	14 Sex	19 Sex	19 Sex	43 Leo	44 Leo	45 Leo	79 Cnc	ο Leo	
內平 (Nèi Píng, High Judge)	17 LMi	16 LMi	43 Lyn	42 Lyn	9 LMi	10 LMi	11 LMi	HIP 47436	20 LMi	23 LMi	24 LMi																																																	

=== Extended Net ===
The Extended Net Mansion corresponds to constellation Hydra.

Asterism	1	2	3	4	5	6	7	8	9	10	11	12	13	14	Note
張宿 (Zhāng Xiù, Extended Net Mansion)	υ1 Hya (Zhang)	λ Hya	μ Hya	HIP 49321	κ Hya	φ1 Hya									
天廟 (Tiān Miào, Celestial Temple)															Not documented in Yixiang Kaocheng

Added Stars

Asterism	+1	+2	+3	+4	+5	Note
張宿 (Zhāng Xiù, Extended Net Mansion)	υ2 Hya	43 Hya	φ2 Hya	44 Hya	HIP 49809	

=== Wings ===
The Wings Mansion corresponds to constellations Crater and Hydra.

Asterism	1	2	3	4	5	6	7	8	9	10	11	12	13	14	15	16	17	18	19	20	21	22	Note
翼宿 (Yì Xiù, Wings Mansion)	α Crt (Alkes)	γ Crt	ζ Crt	λ Crt	ν Hya	η Crt	δ Crt	ι Crt	κ Crt	ε Crt	Unclear	HD 93833	θ Crt	HIP 57587	HD 100219	β Crt	Unclear	Unclear	Unclear	χ1 Hya	Unclear	Unclear	
東甌 (Dōng Ōu, Dong'ou) (Note: This constellation is not documented in Yixiang Kaocheng. Sun & Kistemaker (p. 186) identify q Velorum as the principal star, citing the star catalogue of Zhou Cong of the Song Dynasty. Note than Dong'ou is given the alternative title Barbarians.)	q Vel																						Not documented in Yixiang Kaocheng

Added Stars

Asterism	+1	+2	+3	+4	+5	+6	+7	Note
翼宿 (Yì Xiù, Wings Mansion)	41 Sex	39 Sex	b1 Hya	b2 Hya	b3 Hya	HIP 53963	HIP 54477	

=== Chariot ===
The Chariot Mansion corresponds to constellations Corvus, Crater, Hydra and Virgo.

Asterism	1	2	3	4	5	6	7	Note
軫宿 (Zhěn Xiù, Chariot Mansion)	γ Crv (Gienah)	ε Crv (Minkar)	δ Crv (Algorab)	β Crv (Kraz)				
右辖 (Yòu Xiá, Right Linchpin)	α Crv (Alchiba)							
左辖 (Zuǒ Xiá, Left Linchpin)	η Crv							
長沙 (Chángshā, Changsha)	ζ Crv							
青丘 (Qīng Qiū, Green Hill)	β Hya	HIP 58518	17 Crt	HIP 56332	ξ Hya	HIP 56452	ο Hya	
軍門 (Jūn Mén, Military Gate)								Not documented in Yixiang Kaocheng
土司空 (Tǔ Sī Kōng, Master of Construction)								Not documented in Yixiang Kaocheng
器府 (Qì Fǔ, House for Musical Instruments)								Not documented in Yixiang Kaocheng

Added Stars

Asterism	+1	+2	+3	+4	+5	Note
軫宿 (Zhěn Xiù, Chariot Mansion)	21 Vir	14 Vir	31 Crt	3 Crv	6 Crv	
青丘 (Qīng Qiū, Green Hill)	HIP 57047	HIP 56657	HIP 56623			

== Southern asterisms ==
Stars near the south celestial pole had not been catalogued in China until the arrival of western star charts. In the early 17th century, 23 new asterisms were designated during the compilation of the Chongzhen calendar.

Asterism	1	2	3	4	5	6	7	8	9	10	11	12	Note
海山 (Hǎi Shān, Sea and Mountain)	s Car	η Car	u Car	NGC 3766	λ Cen	λ Mus							
十字架 (Shízìjià, Cross)	γ Cru (Gacrux)	α Cru (Acrux)	β Cru (Mimosa)	δ Cru (Imai)									
馬尾 (Mǎ Wěi, Horse's Tail)	G Cen	ρ Cen	δ Cen										
馬腹 (Mǎ Fù, Horse's Abdomen)	β Cen (Hadar)	m Cen	Unclear										
蜜蜂 (Mìfēng, Bee)	β Mus	γ Mus	α Mus	δ Mus									
三角形 (Sānjiǎoxíng, Triangle)	γ TrA	β TrA	α TrA (Atria)										
異雀 (Yì Què, Exotic Bird)	ζ Aps	ι Aps	β Aps	γ Aps	δ Oct	δ Aps	η Aps	α Aps (Paradys)	ε Aps				
孔雀 (Kǒngquè, Peacock)	η Pav	π Pav	ν Pav	λ Pav	κ Pav	δ Pav	β Pav	ζ Pav	ε Pav	γ Pav	α Pav (Peacock)		
波斯 (Bōsī, Persia)	Unclear	α Ind	Unclear	Unclear	Unclear	Unclear	Unclear	Unclear	Unclear	Unclear	Unclear		
蛇尾 (Shé Wěi, Snake's Tail)	β Hyi	ψ Oct	ν Oct	α Oct									
蛇腹 (Shé Fù, Snake's Abdomen)	ζ Hyi	ε Hyi	δ Hyi	η2 Hyi									
蛇首 (Shé Shǒu, Snake's Head)	α Hyi	β Ret											
鳥喙 (Niǎo Huì, Bird's Beak)	α Tuc (Lang-Exster)	δ Tuc	HIP 118092	β Tuc	ρ Tuc	ζ Tuc	ε Tuc						
鶴 (Hè, Crane)	α Gru (Alnair)	β Gru (Tiaki)	ε Gru	η Gru	γ Tuc	ζ Gru	ι Gru	θ Gru	ρ Gru	ν Gru	δ2 Gru	μ1 Gru	
火鳥 (Huǒ Niǎo, Firebird)	β Scl	ι Phe	σ Phe	ε Phe	κ Phe	α Phe (Ankaa)	μ Phe	λ1 Phe	β Phe	γ Phe			
水委 (Shuǐ Wěi, Crooked Running Water)	α Eri (Achernar)	ζ Phe (Wurren)	η Phe										
附白 (Fù Bái, White Patches Nearby)	γ Hyi	ν Hyi											
夾白 (Jiā Bái, White Patches Attached)	θ Dor	α Ret (Rhombus)											
金魚 (Jīnyú, Goldfish)	γ Dor	α Dor	β Dor	δ Dor	ν Dor								
海石 (Hǎi Shí, Sea Rock)	ε Car (Avior)	ι Car (Aspidiske)	h Car	l Car	υ Car								
飛魚 (Fēi Yú, Flying Fish)	α Vol	γ Vol	β Vol	κ Vol	δ Vol	ζ Vol							
南船 (Nán Chuán, Southern Boat)	q Car	p Car	θ Car	ω Car	β Car (Miaplacidus)								
小斗 (Xiǎo Dǒu, Little Dipper)	β Cha	ε Cha	γ Cha	δ2 Cha	ζ Cha	ι Cha	HIP 43012	θ Cha	HIP 36982				

Added Stars

Asterism	+1	+2	+3	+4	Note
海山 (Hǎi Shān, Sea and Mountain)	p Vel	μ Vel			
十字架 (Shízìjià, Cross)	ε Cru (Ginan)				
三角形 (Sānjiǎoxíng, Triangle)	δ TrA	ε TrA	κ1 Aps	κ2 Aps	
孔雀 (Kǒngquè, Peacock)	HIP 92024	ξ Pav	ω Pav	β Ind	
鳥喙 (Niǎo Huì, Bird's Beak)	η Tuc				
鶴 (Hè, Crane)	μ2 Gru	δ1 Gru			
火鳥 (Huǒ Niǎo, Firebird)	HIP 116602				
金魚 (Jīnyú, Goldfish)	α Pic				
海石 (Hǎi Shí, Sea Rock)	a Car	c Car	i Car	x Car	
南船 (Nán Chuán, Southern Boat)	I Car				
小斗 (Xiǎo Dǒu, Little Dipper)	α Cha				

== Individual stars with traditional names ==
Names listed above are all enumerations within the respective Chinese constellations. The following stars have traditional proper names.

=== Single star asterisms ===
Name	Romanization	Translation	Western name	Proper name	Western constellation	Comments
軍南門	Jūn Nán Mén	Southern Military Gate	Phi Andromedae	Junnanmen	Andromeda	A single-star asterism within the Legs mansion. Jūn Nán Mén became the official name Junnanmen for Phi Andromedae A by approval of IAU on 25 August 2025
玄戈	Xuán Gē	Sombre Halberd	Lambda Boötis	Xuange	Boötes	A single-star asterism within the Purple Forbidden enclosure. Xuán Gē became the official name. Xuange for this star by approval of IAU on 30 June 2017
大角	Dà Jiǎo	Great Horn	Alpha Boötis	Arcturus	Boötes	A single-star asterism within the Neck mansion.
招搖	Zhāo Yáo	Twinkling Indicator	Gamma Boötis	Seginus	Boötes	A single-star asterism within the Root mansion.
積尸	Jī Shī	Cumulative Corpses	Messier 44	Beehive Cluster	Cancer	A single-star asterism within the Ghost mansion.
相	Xiāng	Prime Minister	5 Canum Venaticorum		Canes Venatici	A single-star asterism within the Purple Forbidden enclosure.
野雞	Yě Jī	Wild Cockerel	Nu2 Canis Majoris		Canis Major	A single-star asterism within the Well mansion.
天狼	Tiān Láng	Celestial Wolf	Alpha Canis Majoris	Sirius	Canis Major	A single-star asterism within the Well mansion.
老人	Lǎo Rén	Old Man	Alpha Carinae	Canopus	Carina	A single-star asterism within the Well mansion.
附路	Fù Lù	Auxiliary Road	Zeta Cassiopeiae	Fulu	Cassiopeia	A single-star asterism in the Legs mansion. Fù Lù became the official name Fulu for this star by approval of IAU on 30 June 2017
策	Cè	Whip	Gamma Cassiopeiae	Tiansi	Cassiopeia	A single-star asterism in the Legs mansion.
土司空	Tǔ Sī Kōng	Master of Constructions	Beta Ceti	Diphda	Cetus	A single-star asterism in the Legs mansion.
屎	Shǐ	Excrement	Mu Columbae		Columba	A single-star asterism in the Three Stars mansion.
郎將	Láng Jiāng	Captain of the Bodyguards	31 Comae Berenices		Coma Berenices	A single-star asterism in the Supreme Palace enclosure.
長沙	Cháng Shā	Changsha	Zeta Corvi		Corvus	A single-star asterism in the Chariot mansion.
左轄	Zuǒ Xiá	Left Linchpin	Eta Corvi		Corvus	A single-star asterism in the Chariot mansion.
右轄	Yòu Xiá	Right Linchpin	Alpha Corvi	Alchiba	Corvus	A single-star asterism in the Chariot mansion.
女史	Nǚ Shǐ	Female Protocol	Psi Draconis	Dziban	Draco	A single-star asterism in the Purple Forbidden enclosure.
柱史	Zhù Shǐ	Official of Royal Archives	Phi Draconis		Draco	A single-star asterism in the Purple Forbidden enclosure.
钺	Yuè	Battle Axe	Eta Geminorum	Propus	Gemini	A single-star asterism in the Well mansion.
積薪	Jī Xīn	Pile of Firewood	Kappa Geminorum		Gemini	A single-star asterism in the Well mansion.
帝座	Dì Zuò	Emperor's Seat	Alpha Herculis	Rasalgethi	Hercules	A single-star asterism in the Heavenly Market enclosure.
太子	Tài Zǐ	Crown Prince	93 Leonis		Leo	A single-star asterism in the Supreme Palace enclosure.
從官	Cóng Guān	Retinue	92 Leonis		Leo	A single-star asterism in the Supreme Palace enclosure.
虎賁	Hǔ Bēn	Emperor's Bodyguard	72 Leonis		Leo	A single-star asterism in the Supreme Palace enclosure.
日	Rì	Sun	Kappa Librae		Libra	A single-star asterism in the Room mansion
騎陣將軍	Qí Zhèn Jiāng Jūn	Chariots and Cavalry General	Kappa1 Lupi		Lupus	A single-star asterism in the Root mansion.
候	Hòu	Astrologer	Alpha Ophiuchi	Rasalhague	Ophiuchus	A single-star asterism in the Heavenly Market enclosure.
積屍	Jī Shī	Heap of Corpses	Pi Persei (Note: Allen (1899) associated the name with Algol. See: Perseus, the Champion.)	Gorgonea Secunda	Perseus	A single-star asterism in the Stomach mansion.
積水	Jī Shuǐ	Stored Water	Lambda Persei		Perseus	A single-star asterism in the Stomach mansion.
天讒	Tiān Chán	Celestial Slander	42 Persei		Perseus	A single-star asterism in the Stomach mansion.
北落師門	Běi Là Shī Mén	North Gate of the Military Camp	Alpha Piscis Austrini	Fomalhaut	Piscis Austrinus	A single-star asterism in the Encampment mansion
天綱	Tiān Gāng	Materials for Making Tents	Delta Piscis Austrini		Piscis Austrinus	A single-star asterism in the Encampment mansion
農丈人	Nóng Zhàng Rén	Peasant	HD 172910		Sagittarius	A single-star asterism in the Dipper mansion
鍵閉	Jiàn Bì	Door Bolt	Nu Scorpii	Jabbah	Scorpius	A single-star asterism in the Room mansion
神宮	Shén Gōng	Changing Room	Mu2 Scorpii	Pipirima	Scorpius	A single-star asterism in the Tail mansion
魚	Yú	Fish	Messier 7	Ptolemy Cluster	Scorpius	A single-star asterism in the Tail mansion
傅說	Fù Yuè	Fu Yue	G Scorpii	Fuyue	Scorpius	A single-star asterism in the Tail mansion. Fù Yuè became the official name Fuyue for this star by approval of IAU on 30 June 2017
天乳	Tiān Rǔ	Celestial Milk	Mu Serpentis		Serpens	A single-star asterism in the Root mansion
月	Yuè	Moon	37 Tauri		Taurus	A single-star asterism in the Hairy Head mansion
附耳	Fù Ěr	Whisper	Sigma2 Tauri		Taurus	A single-star asterism in the Net mansion
天關	Tiān Guān	Celestial Gate	Zeta Tauri	Tianguan	Taurus	A single-star asterism in the Net mansion. Tiān Guān became the official name Tianguan for this star by approval of IAU on 30 June 2017
太尊	Tài Zūn	Royal	Psi Ursae Majoris		Ursa Major	A single-star asterism in the Purple Forbidden enclosure
太陽守	Tài Yáng Shǒu	Guard of the Sun	Chi Ursae Majoris	Taiyangshou	Ursa Major	A single-star asterism in the Purple Forbidden enclosure. Tài Yáng Shǒu became the official name Taiyangshou for this star by approval of IAU on 30 June 2017
輔	Fǔ	Assistant	80 Ursae Majoris	Alcor	Ursa Major	A single-star asterism in the Purple Forbidden enclosure.
天記	Tiān Jì	Judge for Estimating the Age of Animals	Lambda Velorum	Suhail	Vela	A single-star asterism in the Ghost mansion
謁者	Yè Zhě	Usher to the Court	16 Virginis		Virgo	A single-star asterism in the Supreme Palace enclosure.

=== Proper names of individual stars ===
Name	Romanization	Translation	Western name	Proper name	Western constellation	Represent	Romanization	Translation	Description
天市左垣六	Tiān Shì Zuǒ Yuán liù	the Sixth Star of Left Wall	Zeta Aquilae	Okab	Aquila	吳越	Wú Yuè	The state of Wu and Yue	Left Wall (天市左垣, Tiānshìzuǒyuán) is the asterism in the Heavenly Market enclosure.
河鼓二	Hé Gŭ èr	the Second Star of Drum at the River	Alpha Aquilae	Altair	Aquila	牛郎 or 牵牛	Niúláng or Qiānniú	Niulang, Cowherd	Niulang, the cowherd who fell in love with the daughter of the Jade Emperor in the Qixi Festival Weaver Girl and the Cowherd folk story. Drum at the River (河鼓, Hégŭ) is the asterism in the Ox mansion.
紫微右垣六	Zǐ Wēi Yòu Yuán liù	the Sixth Star of Right Wall	Alpha Camelopardalis		Camelopardalis	少衛	Shǎo Wèi	The Second Imperial Guard	Right Wall (紫微右垣六, Zǐwēiyòuyuán) is the asterism in the Purple Forbidden enclosure.
			Phi Capricorni		Capricornus	楚	Chǔ	The state of Chu	These stars were once members of Twelve States (十二國, Shíèrguó), which is the asterism in the Girl mansion. The Twelve States refer to these ancient states in the Spring and Autumn period and the Warring States period: Chu (楚), Dai (代), Han (韓), Jin (晉), Qi (齊), Qin (秦), Wei (魏), Yan (燕), Yue (越), Zhao (趙), Zheng (鄭), Zhou (周).
			Iota Capricorni		Capricornus	代一	Dài yī	(First star of) The state of Dai	These stars were once members of Twelve States (十二國, Shíèrguó), which is the asterism in the Girl mansion. The Twelve States refer to these ancient states in the Spring and Autumn period and the Warring States period: Chu (楚), Dai (代), Han (韓), Jin (晉), Qi (齊), Qin (秦), Wei (魏), Yan (燕), Yue (越), Zhao (趙), Zheng (鄭), Zhou (周).
			35 Capricorni		Capricornus	韓	Hán	The state of Han	These stars were once members of Twelve States (十二國, Shíèrguó), which is the asterism in the Girl mansion. The Twelve States refer to these ancient states in the Spring and Autumn period and the Warring States period: Chu (楚), Dai (代), Han (韓), Jin (晉), Qi (齊), Qin (秦), Wei (魏), Yan (燕), Yue (越), Zhao (趙), Zheng (鄭), Zhou (周).
			36 Capricorni		Capricornus	晉	Jìn	The state of Jin	These stars were once members of Twelve States (十二國, Shíèrguó), which is the asterism in the Girl mansion. The Twelve States refer to these ancient states in the Spring and Autumn period and the Warring States period: Chu (楚), Dai (代), Han (韓), Jin (晉), Qi (齊), Qin (秦), Wei (魏), Yan (燕), Yue (越), Zhao (趙), Zheng (鄭), Zhou (周).
			Chi Capricorni		Capricornus	齊	Qí	The state of Qi	These stars were once members of Twelve States (十二國, Shíèrguó), which is the asterism in the Girl mansion. The Twelve States refer to these ancient states in the Spring and Autumn period and the Warring States period: Chu (楚), Dai (代), Han (韓), Jin (晉), Qi (齊), Qin (秦), Wei (魏), Yan (燕), Yue (越), Zhao (趙), Zheng (鄭), Zhou (周).
			Theta Capricorni	Udang	Capricornus	秦一	Qín yī	(First star of) The state of Qin	These stars were once members of Twelve States (十二國, Shíèrguó), which is the asterism in the Girl mansion. The Twelve States refer to these ancient states in the Spring and Autumn period and the Warring States period: Chu (楚), Dai (代), Han (韓), Jin (晉), Qi (齊), Qin (秦), Wei (魏), Yan (燕), Yue (越), Zhao (趙), Zheng (鄭), Zhou (周).
			30 Capricorni		Capricornus	秦二	Qín èr	(Second star of) The state of Qin	These stars were once members of Twelve States (十二國, Shíèrguó), which is the asterism in the Girl mansion. The Twelve States refer to these ancient states in the Spring and Autumn period and the Warring States period: Chu (楚), Dai (代), Han (韓), Jin (晉), Qi (齊), Qin (秦), Wei (魏), Yan (燕), Yue (越), Zhao (趙), Zheng (鄭), Zhou (周).
			33 Capricorni		Capricornus	魏	Wèi	The state of Wei	These stars were once members of Twelve States (十二國, Shíèrguó), which is the asterism in the Girl mansion. The Twelve States refer to these ancient states in the Spring and Autumn period and the Warring States period: Chu (楚), Dai (代), Han (韓), Jin (晉), Qi (齊), Qin (秦), Wei (魏), Yan (燕), Yue (越), Zhao (趙), Zheng (鄭), Zhou (周).
			Zeta Capricorni		Capricornus	燕	Yān	The state of Yan	These stars were once members of Twelve States (十二國, Shíèrguó), which is the asterism in the Girl mansion. The Twelve States refer to these ancient states in the Spring and Autumn period and the Warring States period: Chu (楚), Dai (代), Han (韓), Jin (晉), Qi (齊), Qin (秦), Wei (魏), Yan (燕), Yue (越), Zhao (趙), Zheng (鄭), Zhou (周).
			19 Capricorni		Capricornus	越	Yuè	The state of Yue	These stars were once members of Twelve States (十二國, Shíèrguó), which is the asterism in the Girl mansion. The Twelve States refer to these ancient states in the Spring and Autumn period and the Warring States period: Chu (楚), Dai (代), Han (韓), Jin (晉), Qi (齊), Qin (秦), Wei (魏), Yan (燕), Yue (越), Zhao (趙), Zheng (鄭), Zhou (周).
			20 Capricorni		Capricornus	鄭	Zhèng	The state of Zheng	These stars were once members of Twelve States (十二國, Shíèrguó), which is the asterism in the Girl mansion. The Twelve States refer to these ancient states in the Spring and Autumn period and the Warring States period: Chu (楚), Dai (代), Han (韓), Jin (晉), Qi (齊), Qin (秦), Wei (魏), Yan (燕), Yue (越), Zhao (趙), Zheng (鄭), Zhou (周).
			Eta Capricorni		Capricornus	周一	Zhōu yī	(First star of) The state of Zhou	These stars were once members of Twelve States (十二國, Shíèrguó), which is the asterism in the Girl mansion. The Twelve States refer to these ancient states in the Spring and Autumn period and the Warring States period: Chu (楚), Dai (代), Han (韓), Jin (晉), Qi (齊), Qin (秦), Wei (魏), Yan (燕), Yue (越), Zhao (趙), Zheng (鄭), Zhou (周).
老人	Lǎo Rén	Old Man	Alpha Carinae	Canopus	Carina	壽	Shòu	Longevity	One of the "Three Stars", the Shou star is personified as the Old Man of the South Pole, believed to control the life spans of mortals. He is sometimes conflated with Laozi and corresponding gods of Taoist theology. Old Man is the asterism in the Well mansion.
紫微左垣七	Zǐ Wēi Zuǒ Yuán qī	the Seventh Star of Right Wall	Gamma Cephei	Errai	Cepheus	少衛	Shǎo Wèi	The Second Imperial Guard	Right Wall (紫微右垣六, Zǐwēiyòuyuán) is the asterism in the Purple Forbidden enclosure.
太微左垣五	Tài Wēi Zuǒ Yuán wǔ	the Fifth Star of Left Wall	Alpha Comae Berenices	Diadem	Coma Berenices	東上將	Dōng Shǎng Jiāng	The First Eastern General	Left Wall (太微左垣, Tàiwēizuǒyuán) is the asterism in the Supreme Palace enclosure.
紫微左垣一	Zǐ Wēi Zuǒ Yuán yī	the First Star of Left Wall	Iota Draconis	Edasich	Draco	左樞	Zuǒ Shū	The Left Pivot	Left Wall (紫微左垣, Zǐwēizuǒyuán) is the asterism in the Purple Forbidden enclosure.
紫微左垣二	Zǐ Wēi Zuǒ Yuán èr	the Second Star of Left Wall	Theta Draconis		Draco	上宰	Shǎng Zǎi	The First Premier	Left Wall (紫微左垣, Zǐwēizuǒyuán) is the asterism in the Purple Forbidden enclosure.
紫微左垣三	Zǐ Wēi Zuǒ Yuán sān	the Third Star of Left Wall	Eta Draconis	Athebyne	Draco	少宰	Shǎo Zǎi	The Second Premier	Left Wall (紫微左垣, Zǐwēizuǒyuán) is the asterism in the Purple Forbidden enclosure.
紫微左垣四	Zǐ Wēi Zuǒ Yuán sì	the Fourth Star of Left Wall	Zeta Draconis	Aldhibah	Draco	上弼	Shǎng Bì	The First Minister	Left Wall (紫微左垣, Zǐwēizuǒyuán) is the asterism in the Purple Forbidden enclosure.
紫微左垣五	Zǐ Wēi Zuǒ Yuán wǔ	the Fifth Star of Left Wall	Upsilon Draconis		Draco	少弼	Shǎo Bì	The Second Minister	Left Wall (紫微左垣, Zǐwēizuǒyuán) is the asterism in the Purple Forbidden enclosure.
紫微右垣一	Zǐ Wēi Yòu Yuán yī	the First Star of Right Wall	Alpha Draconis	Thuban	Draco	右樞	Yòu Shū	The Right Pivot	Right Wall (紫微右垣, Zǐwēiyòuyuán) is the asterism in the Purple Forbidden enclosure.
紫微右垣二	Zǐ Wēi Yòu Yuán èr	the Second Star of Right Wall	Kappa Draconis		Draco	少尉	Shǎo Wèi	The Second Chief Judge	Right Wall (紫微右垣, Zǐwēiyòuyuán) is the asterism in the Purple Forbidden enclosure.
紫微右垣三	Zǐ Wēi Yòu Yuán sān	the Third Star of Right Wall	Lambda Draconis	Giausar	Draco	上輔	Shǎng Fǔ	The First Minister	Right Wall (紫微右垣, Zǐwēiyòuyuán) is the asterism in the Purple Forbidden enclosure.
天市左垣一	Tiān Shì Zuǒ Yuán yī	the First Star of Left Wall	Delta Herculis	Sarin	Hercules	魏	Wèi	The state of Wei	Left Wall (天市左垣, Tiānshìzuǒyuán) is the asterism in the Heavenly Market enclosure.
天市左垣二	Tiān Shì Zuǒ Yuán èr	the Second Star of Left Wall	Lambda Herculis	Maasym	Hercules	趙	Zhào	The state of Zhao	Left Wall (天市左垣, Tiānshìzuǒyuán) is the asterism in the Heavenly Market enclosure.
天市左垣三	Tiān Shì Zuǒ Yuán sān	the Third Star of Left Wall	Mu Herculis		Hercules	九河	Jiǔ Hé	Jiuhe	Left Wall (天市左垣, Tiānshìzuǒyuán) is the asterism in the Heavenly Market enclosure.
天市左垣四	Tiān Shì Zuǒ Yuán sì	the Fourth Star of Left Wall	Omicron Herculis		Hercules	中山	Zhōng Shān	Zhongshan	Left Wall (天市左垣, Tiānshìzuǒyuán) is the asterism in the Heavenly Market enclosure.
天市右垣一	Tiān Shì Yòu Yuán yī	the First Star of Right Wall	Beta Herculis	Kornephoros	Hercules	河中	Hé Zhōng	Hezhong	Right Wall (天市左垣, Tiānshìyòuyuán) is the asterism in the Heavenly Market enclosure.
天市右垣二	Tiān Shì Yòu Yuán èr	the Second Star of Right Wall	Gamma Herculis		Hercules	河間	Hé Jiān	Hejian	Right Wall (天市左垣, Tiānshìyòuyuán) is the asterism in the Heavenly Market enclosure.
天市右垣三	Tiān Shì Yòu Yuán sān	the Third Star of Right Wall	Kappa Herculis	Marsic	Hercules	晉	Jìn	The state of Jin	Right Wall (天市左垣, Tiānshìyòuyuán) is the asterism in the Heavenly Market enclosure.
太微右垣二	Tài Wēi Yòu Yuán èr	the Second Star of Right Wall	Sigma Leonis		Leo	西上將	Xī Shǎng Jiāng	The First Western General	Right Wall (太微右垣, Tàiwēiyòuyuán) is the asterism in the Supreme Palace enclosure.
太微右垣三	Tài Wēi Yòu Yuán sān	the Third Star of Right Wall	Iota Leonis		Leo	西次將	Xī Cì Jiāng	The Second Western General	Right Wall (太微右垣, Tàiwēiyòuyuán) is the asterism in the Supreme Palace enclosure.
太微右垣四	Tài Wēi Yòu Yuán sì	the Fourth Star of Right Wall	Theta Leonis	Chertan	Leo	西次相	Xī Cì Xiāng	The Second Western Minister	Right Wall (太微右垣, Tàiwēiyòuyuán) is the asterism in the Supreme Palace enclosure.
太微右垣五	Tài Wēi Yòu Yuán wǔ	the Fifth Star of Right Wall	Delta Leonis	Zosma	Leo	西上相	Xī Shǎng Xiāng	The First Western Minister	Right Wall (太微右垣, Tàiwēiyòuyuán) is the asterism in the Supreme Palace enclosure.
織女一	Zhī Nǚ yī	the First Star of Weaving Girl	Alpha Lyrae	Vega	Lyra	織女	Zhī Nǚ	Weaving Girl	After the Qixi Festival Weaver Girl and the Cowherd folk story. Weaving Girl (織女, Zhīnǚ) is the asterism in the Ox mansion.
天市左垣九	Tiān Shì Zuǒ Yuán jiǔ	the Ninth Star of Left Wall	Nu Ophiuchi		Ophiuchus	燕	Yān	The state of Yan	Left Wall (天市左垣, Tiānshìzuǒyuán) is the asterism in the Heavenly Market enclosure.
天市左垣十一	Tiān Shì Zuǒ Yuán shíyī	the Eleventh Star of Left Wall	Eta Ophiuchi	Sabik	Ophiuchus	宋	Sòng	The state of Song	Left Wall (天市左垣, Tiānshìzuǒyuán) is the asterism in the Heavenly Market enclosure.
天市右垣九	Tiān Shì Yòu Yuán jiǔ	the Ninth Star of Right Wall	Delta Ophiuchi	Yed Prior	Ophiuchus	梁	Liáng	The state of Liang	Right Wall (天市左垣, Tiānshìyòuyuán) is the asterism in the Heavenly Market enclosure.
天市右垣十	Tiān Shì Yòu Yuán shí	the Tenth Star of Right Wall	Epsilon Ophiuchi	Yed Posterior	Ophiuchus	楚	Chǔ	The state of Chu	Right Wall (天市左垣, Tiānshìyòuyuán) is the asterism in the Heavenly Market enclosure.
天市右垣十一	Tiān Shì Yòu Yuán shíyī	the Eleventh Star of Right Wall	Zeta Ophiuchi		Ophiuchus	韓	Hán	The state of Han	Right Wall (天市左垣, Tiānshìyòuyuán) is the asterism in the Heavenly Market enclosure.
天市左垣七	Tiān Shì Zuǒ Yuán qī	the Seventh Star of Left Wall	Theta Serpentis	Alya	Serpens	徐	Xú	The state of Xu	Left Wall (天市左垣, Tiānshìzuǒyuán) is the asterism in the Heavenly Market enclosure.
天市左垣八	Tiān Shì Zuǒ Yuán bā	the Eighth Star of Left Wall	Eta Serpentis		Serpens	東海	Dōng Hǎi	Dong Hai	Left Wall (天市左垣, Tiānshìzuǒyuán) is the asterism in the Heavenly Market enclosure.
天市左垣十	Tiān Shì Zuǒ Yuán shí	the Tenth Star of Left Wall	Xi Serpentis		Serpens	南海	Nán Hǎi	Nan Hai	Left Wall (天市左垣, Tiānshìzuǒyuán) is the asterism in the Heavenly Market enclosure.
天市右垣四	Tiān Shì Yòu Yuán sì	the Fourth Star of Right Wall	Gamma Serpentis	Muning	Serpens	鄭	Zhèng	The state of Zheng	Right Wall (天市右垣, Tiānshìyòuyuán) is the asterism in the Heavenly Market enclosure.
天市右垣五	Tiān Shì Yòu Yuán wǔ	the Fifth Star of Right Wall	Beta Serpentis	Zhou	Serpens	周	Zhōu	The state of Zhou. Zhōu became the official name. Zhou for Beta Serpentis A by approval of IAU on 5 December 2024	Right Wall (天市右垣, Tiānshìyòuyuán) is the asterism in the Heavenly Market enclosure.
天市右垣六	Tiān Shì Yòu Yuán liù	the Sixth Star of Right Wall	Delta Serpentis		Serpens	秦	Qín	The state of Qin	Right Wall (天市右垣, Tiānshìyòuyuán) is the asterism in the Heavenly Market enclosure.
天市右垣七	Tiān Shì Yòu Yuán qī	the Seventh Star of Right Wall	Alpha Serpentis	Unukalhai	Serpens	蜀	Shǔ	The state of Shu	Right Wall (天市右垣, Tiānshìyòuyuán) is the asterism in the Heavenly Market enclosure.
天市右垣八	Tiān Shì Yòu Yuán bā	the Eighth Star of Right Wall	Epsilon Serpentis		Serpens	巴	Bā	The state of Ba	Right Wall (天市右垣, Tiānshìyòuyuán) is the asterism in the Heavenly Market enclosure.
紫微右垣四	Zǐ Wēi Yòu Yuán sì	the Fourth Star of Right Wall	24 Ursae Majoris		Ursa Major	少辅	Shǎo Fǔ	The Second Minister	Right Wall (紫微右垣, Zǐwēiyòuyuán) is the asterism in the Purple Forbidden enclosure.
北斗一	Běi Dǒu yī	the First Star of Northern Dipper	Alpha Ursae Majoris	Dubhe	Ursa Major	天樞	Tiān Shū	The Celestial Pivot	Northern Dipper (北斗, Běidǒu) is the asterism in the Purple Forbidden enclosure.
北斗二	Běi Dǒu èr	the Second Star of Northern Dipper	Beta Ursae Majoris	Merak	Ursa Major	天璇	Tiān Xuán	The Celestial Rotating Jade	Northern Dipper (北斗, Běidǒu) is the asterism in the Purple Forbidden enclosure.
北斗三	Běi Dǒu sān	the Third Star of Northern Dipper	Gamma Ursae Majoris	Phecda	Ursa Major	天璣	Tiān Jī	The Celestial Shining Pearl	Northern Dipper (北斗, Běidǒu) is the asterism in the Purple Forbidden enclosure.
北斗四	Běi Dǒu sì	the Fourth Star of Northern Dipper	Delta Ursae Majoris	Megrez	Ursa Major	天權	Tiān Quán	The Celestial Balance	Northern Dipper (北斗, Běidǒu) is the asterism in the Purple Forbidden enclosure.
北斗五	Běi Dǒu wǔ	the Fifth Star of Northern Dipper	Epsilon Ursae Majoris	Alioth	Ursa Major	玉衡	Yù Héng	The Jade Sighting-Tube	Northern Dipper (北斗, Běidǒu) is the asterism in the Purple Forbidden enclosure.
北斗六	Běi Dǒu liù	the Sixth Star of Northern Dipper	Zeta Ursae Majoris	Mizar	Ursa Major				Northern Dipper (北斗, Běidǒu) is the asterism in the Purple Forbidden enclosure.
北斗六	Běi Dǒu liù	the Sixth Star of Northern Dipper	Zeta Ursae Majoris	Mizar	Ursa Major	禄	Lù	Status	One of the "Three Stars", the Lu star is believed to be Zhang Xian, who lived during the Later Shu dynasty. The word lu specifically refers to the salary of a government official. As such, the Lu star is the star of prosperity, rank, and influence.
北斗六	Běi Dǒu liù	the Sixth Star of Northern Dipper	Zeta Ursae Majoris	Mizar	Ursa Major	開陽	Kāi Yáng	The Opener of Heat	Northern Dipper (北斗, Běidǒu) is the asterism in the Purple Forbidden enclosure.
北斗七	Běi Dǒu qī	the Seventh Star of Northern Dipper	Eta Ursae Majoris	Alkaid	Ursa Major	搖光	Yáo Guāng	The Twinkling Brilliance	Northern Dipper (北斗, Běidǒu) is the asterism in the Purple Forbidden enclosure.
			Iota Ursae Majoris	Talitha	Ursa Major	上台一	Shàng Tái yī	The First Upper Step	These stars is once of members of Three Steps (三台, Sāntái), which is the asterism in the Supreme Palace enclosure mansion. The Three Steps represent three rank official, or triple deck room in the heaven. They are The Upper Step (上台, Shàngtái), The Middle Step (中台, Zhōngtái) and The Lower Step (下台, Xiàtái).
			Kappa Ursae Majoris	Alkaphrah	Ursa Major	上台二	Shàng Tái èr	The Second Upper Step	These stars is once of members of Three Steps (三台, Sāntái), which is the asterism in the Supreme Palace enclosure mansion. The Three Steps represent three rank official, or triple deck room in the heaven. They are The Upper Step (上台, Shàngtái), The Middle Step (中台, Zhōngtái) and The Lower Step (下台, Xiàtái).
			Lambda Ursae Majoris	Tania Borealis	Ursa Major	中台一	Zhōng Tái yī	The First Middle Step	These stars is once of members of Three Steps (三台, Sāntái), which is the asterism in the Supreme Palace enclosure mansion. The Three Steps represent three rank official, or triple deck room in the heaven. They are The Upper Step (上台, Shàngtái), The Middle Step (中台, Zhōngtái) and The Lower Step (下台, Xiàtái).
			Mu Ursae Majoris	Tania Australis	Ursa Major	中台一	Zhōng Tái èr	The Second Middle Step	These stars is once of members of Three Steps (三台, Sāntái), which is the asterism in the Supreme Palace enclosure mansion. The Three Steps represent three rank official, or triple deck room in the heaven. They are The Upper Step (上台, Shàngtái), The Middle Step (中台, Zhōngtái) and The Lower Step (下台, Xiàtái).
			Nu Ursae Majoris	Alula Borealis	Ursa Major	下台一	Xià Tái yī	The First Lower Step	These stars is once of members of Three Steps (三台, Sāntái), which is the asterism in the Supreme Palace enclosure mansion. The Three Steps represent three rank official, or triple deck room in the heaven. They are The Upper Step (上台, Shàngtái), The Middle Step (中台, Zhōngtái) and The Lower Step (下台, Xiàtái).
			Xi Ursae Majoris	Alula Australis	Ursa Major	下台二	Xià Tái èr	The Second Lower Step	These stars is once of members of Three Steps (三台, Sāntái), which is the asterism in the Supreme Palace enclosure mansion. The Three Steps represent three rank official, or triple deck room in the heaven. They are The Upper Step (上台, Shàngtái), The Middle Step (中台, Zhōngtái) and The Lower Step (下台, Xiàtái).
太微左垣一	Tài Wēi Zuǒ Yuán yī	the First Star of Left Wall	Eta Virginis	Zaniah	Virgo	左執法	Zuǒ Zhí Fǎ	The Left Law Administrator	Left Wall (太微左垣, Tàiwēizuǒyuán) is the asterism in the Supreme Palace enclosure.
太微左垣二	Tài Wēi Zuǒ Yuán èr	the Second Star of Left Wall	Gamma Virginis	Porrima	Virgo	東上相	Dōng Shàng Xiàng	The First Eastern Minister	Left Wall (太微左垣, Tàiwēizuǒyuán) is the asterism in the Supreme Palace enclosure.
太微左垣三	Tài Wēi Zuǒ Yuán sān	the Third Star of Left Wall	Delta Virginis	Minelauva	Virgo	東次相	Dōng Cì Xiàng	The Second Eastern Minister	Left Wall (太微左垣, Tàiwēizuǒyuán) is the asterism in the Supreme Palace enclosure.
太微左垣四	Tài Wēi Zuǒ Yuán sì	the Fourth Star of Left Wall	Epsilon Virginis	Vindemiatrix	Virgo	東次將	Dōng Cì Jiàng	The Second Eastern General	Left Wall (太微左垣, Tàiwēizuǒyuán) is the asterism in the Supreme Palace enclosure.
太微右垣一	Tài Wēi Yòu Yuán yī	the First Star of Right Wall	Beta Virginis	Zavijava	Virgo	右執法	Yòu Zhí Fǎ	The Right Law Administrator	Right Wall (太微右垣, Tàiwēiyòuyuán) is the asterism in the Supreme Palace enclosure.

== See also ==
- Chinese star maps
- List of Arabic star names
