= 132 Tauri =

Star in the constellation Taurus

- Location of 132 Tauri (circled in red)

Observation data Epoch J2000 Equinox ICRS
- Constellation: Taurus
- Right ascension: 05^{h} 49^{m} 00.96598^{s}
- Declination: +24° 34′ 03.1220″
- Apparent magnitude (V): 4.89 (5.07 + 9.09)

Characteristics
- Spectral type: G9 III
- B−V color index: 1.021

Astrometry
| Radial velocity (R_{v}) | +15.8±0.6 km/s |
| Proper motion (μ) | RA: +10.44 mas/yr Dec.: −8.30 mas/yr |
| Parallax (π) | 8.97±1.98 mas |
| Distance | approx. 360 ly (approx. 110 pc) |

Details

132 Tau Aa
| Surface gravity (log g) | 2.74±0.11 cgs |
| Temperature | 4,853±47 K |
| Metallicity [Fe/H] | 0.18±0.05 dex |

Other designations
- 132 Tau, BD+24°970, FK5 2435, HD 38751, HIP 27468, HR 2002, SAO 77592, WDS J05490+2434AB

Database references
| SIMBAD | data |

132 Tauri is a binary star system in the constellation Taurus. It is faintly visible to the naked eye with an apparent visual magnitude of 4.89. Based upon a poorly constrained annual parallax shift of 8.97±1.98 mas, it is located roughly 360 light years from the Sun. The system is moving further away with a heliocentric radial velocity of +16 km/s. It lies near the ecliptic and thus is subject to occultation by the Moon. One such event was observed September 3, 1991.

This system forms a wide double star with an angular separation of 3.8″ along a position angle of 230°, as of 1991. The brighter star, component A, has an apparent magnitude of 4.99 while the fainter secondary, component B, is of magnitude 9.09. The primary is itself an unresolved binary with a combined stellar classification of G9 III, which matches an aging G-type giant star that has exhausted the hydrogen at its core and evolved away from the main sequence.
