= Rho Cephei =

The Bayer designation Rho Cephei (ρ Cephei / ρ Cep) is shared by two stars in the constellation Cepheus:

- ρ^{1} Cephei
- ρ^{2} Cephei, often called just ρ Cephei
