= 87 Leonis =

Star in the constellation Leo

- Location of 87 Leonis (circled in red)

Observation data Epoch J2000.0 Equinox J2000.0 (ICRS)
- Constellation: Leo
- Right ascension: 11^{h} 30^{m} 18.89335^{s}
- Declination: −03° 00′ 12.5712″
- Apparent magnitude (V): 4.77

Characteristics
- Evolutionary stage: red giant branch
- Spectral type: K3+ III Fe−0.5
- U−B color index: +1.83
- B−V color index: +1.529±0.016
- R−I color index: +0.84

Astrometry
Radial velocity (R_{v})	18.40±0.15 km/s
Proper motion (μ)	RA: +19.554 mas/yr Dec.: −16.149 mas/yr
Parallax (π)	6.5892±0.1128 mas
Distance	495 ± 8 ly (152 ± 3 pc)
Absolute magnitude (M_{V})	−1.56

Details
Mass	0.86 or 0.94 M_{☉}
Radius	52.4±1.0 R_{☉}
Luminosity	544±54 L_{☉}
Surface gravity (log g)	0.95±0.06 cgs
Temperature	3,852±90 K
Metallicity [Fe/H]	−0.39±0.05 dex
Rotational velocity (v sin i)	≤ 19 km/s

Other designations
- e Leonis, 87 Leo, BD−02°3360, FK5 2917, GC 15779, HD 99998, HIP 56127, HR 4432, SAO 138238, PPM 178510

Database references
SIMBAD	data

87 Leonis is a single star in the zodiac constellation of Leo, located approximately 495 light years away from Earth. It has the Bayer designation e Leonis; 87 Leonis is the Flamsteed designation. This object is visible by the naked eye as a faint orange-hued star with an apparent visual magnitude of 4.77. It is moving away from the Earth with a heliocentric radial velocity of 19 km/s. The star is positioned near the ecliptic and thus is subject to occultation by the Moon.

This is an aging K-type giant star with a stellar classification of K3+ III Fe−0.5, which means it has exhausted the hydrogen at its core and evolved away from the main sequence. The suffix notation indicates a mild underabundance of iron in the atmosphere. It has expanded to 52 times the Sun's radius and is radiating around 540 times the Sun's luminosity from its photosphere at an effective temperature of 3,852 K.
