= Tau Aquarii =

The Bayer designation Tau Aquarii (τ Aqr / τ Aquarii) is shared by two star systems, in the constellation Aquarius:

- τ^{1} Aquarii
- τ^{2} Aquarii

They are separated by 0.65° on the sky.

All of them were member of asterism 羽林軍 (Yǔ Lín Jūn), Palace Guard, Encampment mansion.
