= N Velorum =

The Bayer designations n Velorum and N Velorum are distinct. Due to technical limitations, both designations link here. For the star

- n Velorum, see HD 74272 (HR 3452)
- N Velorum, see HD 82668 (HR 3803)
