= B Velorum =

The Bayer designations b Velorum and B Velorum are distinct. Due to technical limitations, both designations link here. For the star

- b Velorum, see HD 74180
- B Velorum, see HD 70930

== See also ==
- Bibio velorum, abbreviated as B. velorum, a species of fly
