= 22 Andromedae =

Star in the constellation Andromeda

- Location of 22 Andromedae (circled)

Observation data Epoch J2000 Equinox ICRS
- Constellation: Andromeda
- Right ascension: 00^{h} 10^{m} 19.24653^{s}
- Declination: +46° 04′ 20.1704″
- Apparent magnitude (V): 5.04

Characteristics
- Spectral type: F5 II or F5 Ib–II metal-weak
- B−V color index: +0.04

Astrometry
Radial velocity (R_{v})	−8.2±2.2 km/s
Proper motion (μ)	RA: 5.472 mas/yr Dec.: 0.086 mas/yr
Parallax (π)	2.2233±0.3881 mas
Distance	approx. 1,500 ly (approx. 450 pc)
Absolute magnitude (M_{V})	−3.51

Details
Mass	6.1±0.4 M_{☉}
Radius	17 R_{☉}
Luminosity	1,436 L_{☉}
Surface gravity (log g)	2.10±0.08 cgs
Temperature	6,270±150 K
Metallicity [Fe/H]	−0.09±0.05 dex
Rotational velocity (v sin i)	46 km/s
Age	62 Myr

Other designations
- Tianjiu, 22 And, BD+45°17, FK5 4, HD 571, HIP 841, HR 27, SAO 36123, PPM 42645

Database references
SIMBAD	data

22 Andromedae, also named Tianjiu, is a single star in the constellation Andromeda. 22 Andromedae is the Flamsteed designation, which is abbreviated 22 And. It is visible to the naked eye with an apparent visual magnitude of 5.04. The distance to 22 And can be estimated from its annual parallax shift of just 2.2 mas, which shows it to be around 1,500 light years away. It is moving closer to the Earth with a heliocentric radial velocity of −8.2 km/s.

This is a bright giant with a stellar classification of F5 II. Gray et al. (2001) classify it as F5 Ib–II metal-weak, with the metallic lines matching a class of F0 whereas hydrogen lines match an F5. It is around 62 million years old with a projected rotational velocity of 46 km/s. The star has six times the mass of the Sun and has expanded to about 17 times the Sun's radius. It is radiating 1,436 times the Sun's luminosity from its photosphere at an effective temperature of 6,270 km/s.

In Chinese astronomy, this star is part of the asterism Tiān Jiù (天厩, Celestial Stable). The IAU Working Group on Star Names adopted the name Tianjiu for this star on 15 October 2026.
