= Psi Orionis =

The Bayer designation Psi Orionis (ψ Ori / ψ Orionis) is shared by two stars in the constellation Orion:

- 25 Orionis (ψ^{1}), a Be star
- 30 Orionis (ψ^{2}, often just called ψ Orionis), an ellipsoidal and eclipsing variable
