= Y Eridani =

The Bayer designation y Eridani and the variable star designation Y Eridani are distinct. Due to technical limitations, both designations link here. For the star

- y Eridani, see HD 22663
- Y Eridani, see HD 13009
