= Q Velorum =

The Bayer designations q Velorum and Q Velorum are distinct. Due to technical limitations, both designations link here. For the star

- q Velorum, see HD 88955
- Q Velorum, see HD 88206
