= S Eridani =

The Bayer designation s Eridani and the variable star designation S Eridani are distinct. Due to technical limitations, both designations link here.

- For the star s Eridani, see HD 16754.
- For the star S Eridani, see 64 Eridani.
