= Psi Aquarii =

The Bayer designation ψ Aquarii (psi Aquarii, ψ Aqr) is shared by three stars/star systems in the constellation Aquarius:

- ψ^{1} Aquarii (91 Aquarii), a multiple star system with an exoplanet orbiting the giant primary
- ψ^{2} Aquarii (93 Aquarii), a solitary Be star
- ψ^{3} Aquarii (95 Aquarii), a binary star system

All of them were members of the asterism 羽林軍 (Yǔ Lín Jūn), Palace Guard, in the Encampment mansion.
