= Omega Aquarii =

The Bayer designation Omega Aquarii (ω Aqr / ω Aquarii) is shared by two star systems, in the constellation Aquarius:

- ω^{1} Aquarii (102 Aquarii)
- ω^{2} Aquarii (105 Aquarii)

They are separated by 0.78° on the sky.

All of them were member of asterism 羽林軍 (Yǔ Lín Jūn), Palace Guard, Encampment mansion.
