= 78 Aquarii =

Star in the constellation Aquarius

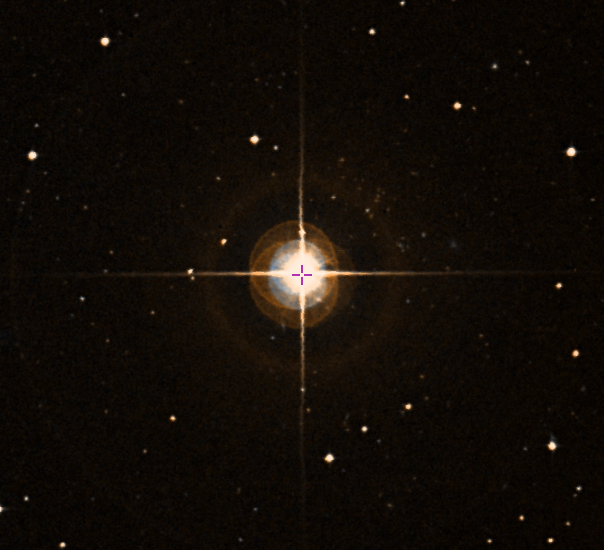
- Snapshot of 78 Aqr from Digitized Sky Survey project

Observation data Epoch J2000 Equinox ICRS
- Constellation: Aquarius
- Right ascension: 22^{h} 54^{m} 34.12178^{s}
- Declination: −07° 12′ 16.6490″
- Apparent magnitude (V): 6.181

Characteristics
- Spectral type: K2III

Astrometry
Radial velocity (R_{v})	11.63±0.14 km/s
Proper motion (μ)	RA: −14.811 mas/yr Dec.: −34.596 mas/yr
Parallax (π)	5.4411±0.0498 mas
Distance	599 ± 5 ly (184 ± 2 pc)

Details
Radius	21.775 R_{☉}
Luminosity	203 L_{☉}
Surface gravity (log g)	1.72 cgs
Temperature	4,400±30 K
Metallicity [Fe/H]	−0.01 dex

Other designations
- BD−07°5886, HD 216637, HIP 113127, HR 8710, SAO 146382

Database references
SIMBAD	data

78 Aquarii (abbreviated 78 Aqr) is a star in the constellation of Aquarius. 78 Aquarii is its Flamsteed designation. Based on stellar parallax measurements made by Gaia, it is located about 600 light-years (180 parsecs) from the Sun.

78 Aquarii has a spectral type of K2III, indicating a giant star with a reddish color. Its apparent magnitude is 6.18, indicating it is not visible to the sky for all but the best viewing conditions. At its surface, its temperature is estimated to be roughly 4,400 K. It has no known exoplanets.
