= List of stars in Camelopardalis =

This is the list of notable stars in the constellation Camelopardalis, sorted by decreasing brightness.

Name	B	F	Var	HD	HIP	RA	Dec	vis. mag.	abs. mag.	Dist. (ly)	Sp. class	Notes
β Cam	β	10		31910	23522	05^{h} 03^{m} 25.10^{s}	+60° 26′ 32.2″	4.03	−3.40	997	G0Ib	
CS Cam			CS	21291	16228	03^{h} 29^{m} 04.13^{s}	+59° 56′ 25.2″	4.21	−6.39	4289	B9Ia	α Cyg variable, ΔV = 0.05^{m}
α Cam	α	9		30614	22783	04^{h} 54^{m} 03.01^{s}	+66° 20′ 33.6″	4.26	−7.38	6936	O9.5Ia SB:	Shǎowèi (少衛)
BE Cam			BE	23475	17884	03^{h} 49^{m} 31.29^{s}	+65° 31′ 33.6″	4.39	−2.97	964	M1III	Custos, irregular variable, V_{max} = 4.35^{m}, V_{min} = 4.48^{m}
7 Cam		7		31278	23040	04^{h} 57^{m} 17.22^{s}	+53° 45′ 07.5″	4.43	−0.88	376	A1V	
CE Cam			CE	21389	16281	03^{h} 29^{m} 54.75^{s}	+58° 52′ 43.5″	4.55	−4.85	2470	A0Ia SB:	α Cyg variable, ΔV = 0.03^{m}
HD 49878				49878	33694	07^{h} 00^{m} 03.85^{s}	+76° 58′ 38.8″	4.55	0.76	187	K4III	
γ Cam	γ			23401	17959	03^{h} 50^{m} 21.48^{s}	+71° 19′ 56.5″	4.59	−0.47	335	A2IVn	Shaowei
BK Cam			BK	20336	15520	03^{h} 19^{m} 59.26^{s}	+65° 39′ 08.4″	4.74	−2.21	801	B2.5Vne	γ Cas variable, ΔV = ~0.11^{m}
HD 42818				42818	29997	06^{h} 18^{m} 50.78^{s}	+69° 19′ 12.1″	4.76	1.10	176	A0Vn	Shangwei
HD 23089				23089	17587	03^{h} 46^{m} 02.33^{s}	+63° 20′ 42.2″	4.78	−2.17	799	A3V...	
VZ Cam			VZ	55966	36547	07^{h} 31^{m} 04.48^{s}	+82° 24′ 41.6″	4.92	−0.89	473	M4IIIa	semiregular variable, V_{max} = 4.80^{m}, V_{min} = 4.96^{m}, P = 23.7 d
HD 24479				24479	18505	03^{h} 57^{m} 25.44^{s}	+63° 04′ 20.1″	4.95	−0.13	338	B9.5V	
HD 24480				24480	18488	03^{h} 57^{m} 08.29^{s}	+61° 06′ 32.1″	4.99	−3.78	1852	K3I-II	
HD 25291				25291	19018	04^{h} 04^{m} 27.16^{s}	+59° 09′ 19.8″	5.00	−3.63	1734	F0II	
BD Cam			BD	22649	17296	03^{h} 42^{m} 09.35^{s}	+63° 13′ 00.3″	5.06	−0.95	520	S5.3 SB:	a symbiotic star; irregular variable, V_{max} = 5.04^{m}, V_{min} = 5.17^{m}
3 Cam		3		29317	21727	04^{h} 39^{m} 54.69^{s}	+53° 04′ 46.5″	5.07	−0.84	495	K0III SB	
HD 33564				33564	25110	05^{h} 22^{m} 33.78^{s}	+79° 13′ 50.7″	5.08	3.47	68	F6V	has a planet (b)
HD 21447				21447	16292	03^{h} 30^{m} 00.23^{s}	+55° 27′ 06.6″	5.09	1.25	191	A1V	
43 Cam		43		49340	33104	06^{h} 53^{m} 42.24^{s}	+68° 53′ 17.9″	5.11	−2.32	1000	B7III	
CQ Cam			CQ	20797	15890	03^{h} 24^{m} 40.56^{s}	+64° 35′ 09.6″	5.13	−2.79	1249	M0II	irregular variable, ΔV = ~0.12^{m}
42 Cam		42		48879	32864	06^{h} 50^{m} 57.09^{s}	+67° 34′ 18.9″	5.14	−1.98	867	B4IV	
HD 106112				106112	59504	12^{h} 12^{m} 11.91^{s}	+77° 36′ 58.3″	5.14	2.50	110	A5m	rotating ellipsoidal variable, ΔV = 0.07^{m}
HD 26764				26764	19949	04^{h} 16^{m} 43.11^{s}	+53° 36′ 42.5″	5.20	0.03	353	A2Vn	
31 Cam		31	TU	39220	27971	05^{h} 54^{m} 57.83^{s}	+59° 53′ 18.3″	5.20	−0.27	405	A2V	TU Cam; eclipsing spectroscopic binary
11 Cam		11	BV	32343	23734	05^{h} 06^{m} 08.46^{s}	+58° 58′ 20.6″	5.22	−1.35	671	B2.5Ve	BV Cam; γ Cas variable, ΔV = 0.07^{m}; double star with 12 Cam
16 Cam		16		34787	25197	05^{h} 23^{m} 27.83^{s}	+57° 32′ 40.3″	5.24	0.15	340	A0Vn	
HD 90089				90089	51502	10^{h} 31^{m} 05.02^{s}	+82° 33′ 30.7″	5.25	3.59	70	F2V	
HD 27022				27022	20266	04^{h} 20^{m} 40.36^{s}	+65° 08′ 25.6″	5.26	0.22	333	G5III	
4 Cam		4		30121	22287	04^{h} 48^{m} 00.22^{s}	+56° 45′ 27.1″	5.29	1.81	162	A3m	
37 Cam		37		41597	29246	06^{h} 09^{m} 58.99^{s}	+58° 56′ 08.3″	5.35	0.20	349	G8III	
2 Cam		2		29316	21730	04^{h} 39^{m} 58.03^{s}	+53° 28′ 23.7″	5.36	0.71	277	A8V	multiple star
36 Cam		36		41927	29490	06^{h} 12^{m} 51.05^{s}	+65° 43′ 06.6″	5.36	−1.11	642	K2II-III	
40 Cam		40		42633	29730	06^{h} 15^{m} 40.51^{s}	+59° 59′ 56.5″	5.37	−0.55	498	K3III	
HD 64307				64307	39117	08^{h} 00^{m} 11.76^{s}	+73° 55′ 04.8″	5.37	−1.29	700	K3III	
Σ 1694 A				112028	62572	12^{h} 49^{m} 13.80^{s}	+83° 24′ 46.3″	5.38	0.54	303	A1IIIsh	
HD 64486				64486	39538	08^{h} 04^{m} 47.19^{s}	+79° 28′ 47.1″	5.39	0.36	330	B9IVs	
HD 23277				23277	17854	03^{h} 49^{m} 13.70^{s}	+70° 52′ 16.3″	5.40	0.40	325	A2m	
HD 27245				27245	20376	04^{h} 21^{m} 47.58^{s}	+60° 44′ 09.2″	5.40	−0.18	427	M0III	
17 Cam		17		35583	25769	05^{h} 30^{m} 10.21^{s}	+63° 04′ 02.0″	5.43	−1.85	931	M1III	
BN Cam			BN	32650	24254	05^{h} 12^{m} 22.45^{s}	+73° 56′ 48.3″	5.44	0.14	374	B9p Si	α^{2} CVn variable, ΔV = 0.05^{m}, P = 0.7325 d
HD 46588				46588	32439	06^{h} 46^{m} 14.47^{s}	+79° 33′ 58.6″	5.44	4.18	58	F7V	
HD 30442				30442	22626	04^{h} 52^{m} 05.17^{s}	+63° 30′ 20.3″	5.47	−0.46	499	M2III	
5 Cam		5		30958	22854	04^{h} 55^{m} 03.14^{s}	+55° 15′ 32.9″	5.52	−1.02	661	B9.5V	
HD 89571				89571	51384	10^{h} 29^{m} 42.21^{s}	+84° 15′ 07.6″	5.52	2.47	133	F0IV	
HD 68375				68375	40793	08^{h} 19^{m} 32.21^{s}	+75° 45′ 24.7″	5.55	0.79	292	G8III	
HD 37289				37289	26882	05^{h} 42^{m} 26.45^{s}	+65° 41′ 51.7″	5.62	0.96	279	K5III	
HD 58425				58425	36528	07^{h} 30^{m} 52.70^{s}	+68° 27′ 56.6″	5.63	−0.08	453	K2III	
HD 34255				34255	24914	05^{h} 20^{m} 22.61^{s}	+62° 39′ 13.4″	5.64	−3.27	1976	K4Iab:	
HD 26670				26670	19968	04^{h} 16^{m} 53.55^{s}	+61° 51′ 00.1″	5.69	0.20	409	B5Vn	
HD 50885				50885	33827	07^{h} 01^{m} 21.40^{s}	+70° 48′ 30.0″	5.69	−0.04	457	K4III	
HD 26755				26755	19983	04^{h} 17^{m} 08.07^{s}	+57° 51′ 37.7″	5.72	1.18	263	K1III	
HD 22764				22764	17342	03^{h} 42^{m} 42.73^{s}	+59° 58′ 09.8″	5.74	−3.41	2203	K3.5IIIb + K3V	
HD 117566				117566	65595	13^{h} 26^{m} 57.22^{s}	+78° 38′ 37.7″	5.74	0.98	292	G2.5IIIb	
HD 31134				31134	22936	04^{h} 56^{m} 07.08^{s}	+52° 52′ 11.0″	5.75	−0.08	478	A2Vs	
HD 45866				45866	31940	06^{h} 40^{m} 28.84^{s}	+77° 59′ 44.9″	5.75	−0.50	579	K5III	Kamelos
DL Cam		1	DL	28446	21148	04^{h} 32^{m} 01.84^{s}	+53° 54′ 39.0″	5.78			B0III SB	β Cep variable, ΔV = 0.04^{m}
HD 104985				104985	58952	12^{h} 05^{m} 14.74^{s}	+76° 54′ 21.4″	5.78	0.74	333	G9III	Tonatiuh, has a planet (b)
HD 23005				23005	17585	03^{h} 46^{m} 00.82^{s}	+67° 12′ 06.8″	5.79	2.07	181	F0IV	
HD 24141				24141	18217	03^{h} 53^{m} 43.19^{s}	+57° 58′ 31.3″	5.80	2.21	170	A5m	
HD 33541				33541	24732	05^{h} 18^{m} 13.25^{s}	+73° 16′ 05.3″	5.81	0.60	359	A0V	
HD 23523				23523	17891	03^{h} 49^{m} 36.62^{s}	+63° 17′ 49.6″	5.82	1.57	231	A5Vn	
HD 25274				25274	19129	04^{h} 06^{m} 03.17^{s}	+68° 40′ 47.9″	5.88	−0.53	623	K2III	
HD 46509				46509	31946	06^{h} 40^{m} 32.24^{s}	+71° 44′ 55.5″	5.88	−0.66	663	K0III	
HD 27322				27322	20380	04^{h} 21^{m} 51.82^{s}	+56° 30′ 22.7″	5.91	1.02	310	A3V	
HD 28780				28780	21452	04^{h} 36^{m} 24.23^{s}	+64° 15′ 41.8″	5.91	0.24	443	A1V	
Σ 1694 B				112014	62561	12^{h} 49^{m} 06.79^{s}	+83° 25′ 04.1″	5.92	1.75	222	A0V	spectroscopic binary
HD 120565				120565	66878	13^{h} 42^{m} 22.94^{s}	+82° 45′ 09.0″	5.92	0.68	364	G9III	
26 Cam		26		38091	27249	05^{h} 46^{m} 30.37^{s}	+56° 06′ 56.6″	5.93	2.07	193	A4Vn	
51 Cam		51		62066	37949	07^{h} 46^{m} 40.04^{s}	+65° 27′ 20.3″	5.93	0.89	332	K2III:	
HD 28204				28204	21247	04^{h} 33^{m} 30.62^{s}	+72° 31′ 43.8″	5.94	0.65	373	A8m	
HD 29678				29678	22361	04^{h} 48^{m} 50.26^{s}	+75° 56′ 29.6″	5.96	2.66	149	A9IV	
HD 21819				21819	16599	03^{h} 33^{m} 39.10^{s}	+54° 58′ 29.5″	5.98	1.82	222	A3V	
HD 32356				32356	23766	05^{h} 06^{m} 29.66^{s}	+61° 10′ 11.8″	6.00	−0.19	563	K5II	
HD 105943				105943	59384	12^{h} 11^{m} 00.09^{s}	+81° 42′ 35.4″	6.00	−1.64	1101	K5III:	
53 Cam		53	AX	65339	39261	08^{h} 01^{m} 42.49^{s}	+60° 19′ 27.9″	6.02	1.05	321	A3Vp...	AX Cam; α^{2} CVn variable, V_{max} = 5.95^{m}, V_{min} = 6.08^{m}, P = 8.0278 d; spectroscopic binary
HD 31662				31662	23380	05^{h} 01^{m} 36.02^{s}	+61° 04′ 42.4″	6.03	3.19	120	F4V + M0V	
HD 44472				44472	30794	06^{h} 28^{m} 14.49^{s}	+70° 32′ 07.0″	6.03	−0.12	553	A4V + G1V	
HD 26076				26076	19730	04^{h} 13^{m} 44.81^{s}	+72° 07′ 34.4″	6.05	0.80	365	K1III	
HD 31312				31312	23442	05^{h} 02^{m} 19.79^{s}	+74° 16′ 09.4″	6.05	−0.37	628	K5III	
24 Cam		24		37601	26942	05^{h} 43^{m} 01.66^{s}	+56° 34′ 53.2″	6.05	2.11	200	K0III	
HD 26553				26553	19823	04^{h} 15^{m} 01.80^{s}	+57° 27′ 37.3″	6.06	−1.96	1309	G2-3II	
12 Cam		12	BM	32357	23743	05^{h} 06^{m} 12.14^{s}	+59° 01′ 17.1″	6.08	−0.33	625	K0III	BM Cam; RS CVn variable, ΔV = 0.14^{m}, P = 82.8 d; double star with 11 Cam
HD 23383				23383	17707	03^{h} 47^{m} 32.12^{s}	+55° 55′ 19.4″	6.09	0.48	431	B9Vnn	
8 Cam		8		31579	23216	04^{h} 59^{m} 46.34^{s}	+53° 09′ 19.7″	6.09	−0.77	767	K4III	
HD 65448				65448	39340	08^{h} 02^{m} 30.82^{s}	+63° 05′ 25.2″	6.09	0.07	522	G1III	Spectroscopic binary
HD 31590				31590	23617	05^{h} 04^{m} 39.65^{s}	+74° 04′ 01.2″	6.10	0.02	537	A1V	
HD 99945				99945	56253	11^{h} 31^{m} 51.08^{s}	+81° 07′ 37.8″	6.12	2.24	195	A2m	suspected variable
15 Cam		15	DV	34233	24836	05^{h} 19^{m} 27.85^{s}	+58° 07′ 02.7″	6.13	−1.02	879	B5V	DV Cam; Algol variable, V_{max} = 6.10^{m}, V_{min} = 6.30^{m}
HD 21427				21427	16303	03^{h} 30^{m} 10.93^{s}	+59° 21′ 57.8″	6.14	1.07	337	A0V + A2V	
HD 25425				25425	19177	04^{h} 06^{m} 38.81^{s}	+65° 31′ 15.1″	6.14	0.41	457	A4Vm	
30 Cam		30		38831	27731	05^{h} 52^{m} 17.26^{s}	+58° 57′ 50.9″	6.14	0.02	545	A0Vs	
HD 33618				33618	24479	05^{h} 15^{m} 11.38^{s}	+59° 24′ 20.6″	6.15	1.28	307	K2III-IV	
19 Cam		19		36570	26408	05^{h} 37^{m} 15.07^{s}	+64° 09′ 17.5″	6.15	0.86	372	A0V	
HD 72582				72582	42484	08^{h} 39^{m} 42.64^{s}	+73° 37′ 47.7″	6.16	0.97	355	G7III	
HD 33266				33266	24313	05^{h} 13^{m} 02.83^{s}	+61° 51′ 00.1″	6.17	0.34	477	A2III	
23 Cam		23		37638	27046	05^{h} 44^{m} 08.46^{s}	+61° 28′ 35.5″	6.17	1.23	318	G5III:	
HD 27402				27402	20456	04^{h} 22^{m} 57.91^{s}	+59° 36′ 58.6″	6.18	0.86	378	A4V + F6V	
HD 38284				38284	27472	05^{h} 49^{m} 04.68^{s}	+62° 48′ 29.5″	6.18	0.67	412	A4V	
HD 36384				36384	26638	05^{h} 39^{m} 43.72^{s}	+75° 02′ 37.7″	6.19	−0.06	579	M0III	slow irregular variable ΔV = 0.61^{m}
HD 31675				31675	23484	05^{h} 02^{m} 50.34^{s}	+66° 49′ 25.6″	6.20	3.97	91	F6V:	
HD 31563				31563	23582	05^{h} 04^{m} 12.77^{s}	+73° 45′ 50.2″	6.21	−1.84	1331	M0III	
FR Cam			FR	104216	58545	12^{h} 00^{m} 18.84^{s}	+80° 51′ 11.8″	6.21	−0.79	819	M2III	irregular variable, V_{max} = 6.16^{m}, V_{min} = 6.37^{m}
HD 38645				38645	27795	05^{h} 52^{m} 55.49^{s}	+68° 28′ 17.9″	6.22	0.70	415	G9III	
HD 39429				39429	28205	05^{h} 57^{m} 34.95^{s}	+66° 05′ 46.1″	6.24	0.66	427	K3III	
HD 25948				25948	19400	04^{h} 09^{m} 22.16^{s}	+54° 49′ 44.7″	6.25	2.87	155	F5V	
HD 115337				115337	64437	13^{h} 12^{m} 25.46^{s}	+80° 28′ 16.6″	6.25	−0.37	686	K0Ib	
HD 36496				36496	26410	05^{h} 37^{m} 16.05^{s}	+66° 41′ 48.2″	6.26	1.76	259	A8Vn	Double star
HD 45947				45947	31703	06^{h} 37^{m} 55.24^{s}	+73° 41′ 44.3″	6.26	3.51	116	F4V	
HD 104904				104904	58874	12^{h} 04^{m} 28.53^{s}	+85° 35′ 12.9″	6.27	1.86	249	F9III	
HD 27855				27855	20772	04^{h} 27^{m} 00.86^{s}	+57° 35′ 07.2″	6.28	−0.54	755	A0III + A9V?	
HD 40055				40055	28831	06^{h} 05^{m} 09.32^{s}	+75° 35′ 09.4″	6.28	−0.44	720	K4III	
HD 67934				67934	41208	08^{h} 24^{m} 33.11^{s}	+82° 25′ 51.0″	6.28	−0.31	679	A2Vn	
KZ Cam			KZ	22316	16974	03^{h} 38^{m} 19.70^{s}	+56° 55′ 58.1″	6.29	0.13	557	B9p	HR 1094; α² CVn variable, V_{max} = 6.28^{m}, V_{min} = 6.30^{m}
HD 25877				25877	19412	04^{h} 09^{m} 27.58^{s}	+59° 54′ 29.1″	6.29	−1.30	1072	G8II	
HD 55075				55075	36019	07^{h} 25^{m} 21.97^{s}	+81° 15′ 27.1″	6.30	−0.73	832	A0III	
HD 76990				76990	45421	09^{h} 15^{m} 21.24^{s}	+84° 10′ 51.6″	6.30	1.53	294	F0IV	
HD 23662				23662	18067	03^{h} 51^{m} 41.75^{s}	+68° 30′ 27.1″	6.31	−0.70	821	B9IVp	
HD 24164				24164	18438	03^{h} 56^{m} 30.33^{s}	+71° 49′ 17.9″	6.31	2.42	196	A5Vm	
HD 25602				25602	19172	04^{h} 06^{m} 36.58^{s}	+54° 00′ 32.0″	6.31	1.36	319	K0III-IV	
HD 71973				71973	42249	08^{h} 36^{m} 48.78^{s}	+74° 43′ 25.4″	6.31	1.69	273	A5IV-V + G6V	double star
HD 86321				86321	49688	10^{h} 08^{m} 34.40^{s}	+83° 55′ 06.1″	6.31	−0.85	883	K5III	
HD 30144				30144	22300	04^{h} 48^{m} 06.94^{s}	+55° 36′ 10.2″	6.32	2.78	166	F2V	
HD 40827				40827	28829	06^{h} 05^{m} 08.23^{s}	+59° 23′ 36.0″	6.32	0.52	471	K0+IIICN1-	
HD 26101				26101	19673	04^{h} 12^{m} 51.88^{s}	+68° 30′ 04.1″	6.33	0.96	387	K1III	
HD 111112				111112	62170	12^{h} 44^{m} 25.90^{s}	+80° 37′ 16.1″	6.33	0.57	462	A5m	
HD 30085				30085	22508	04^{h} 50^{m} 36.39^{s}	+70° 56′ 29.7″	6.36	−0.13	647	B9III	
HD 32781				32781	24440	05^{h} 14^{m} 35.54^{s}	+76° 28′ 22.0″	6.36	0.81	421	A0III:	
HD 54070				54070	34956	07^{h} 13^{m} 57.99^{s}	+71° 48′ 59.5″	6.36	0.94	396	K0.5III	
47 Cam		47		56820	35735	07^{h} 22^{m} 17.19^{s}	+59° 54′ 07.1″	6.36	2.13	229	A8Vm	
HD 21794				21794	16602	03^{h} 33^{m} 41.23^{s}	+57° 52′ 07.1″	6.37	2.09	234	F7V	double star
HD 32715				32715	24017	05^{h} 09^{m} 44.53^{s}	+64° 55′ 11.8″	6.37	3.38	129	F3V:	
HD 77246				77246	45097	09^{h} 11^{m} 12.73^{s}	+80° 49′ 44.2″	6.37	1.93	252	F2IV	
HD 34200				34200	24955	05^{h} 20^{m} 40.69^{s}	+66° 44′ 48.5″	6.39	1.04	384	G6III	
HD 30752				30752	22720	04^{h} 53^{m} 09.80^{s}	+52° 50′ 28.3″	6.40	0.37	523	A2V	
HD 69054				69054	41011	08^{h} 22^{m} 09.50^{s}	+74° 49′ 12.9″	6.40	0.63	466	K0III + G2V	
HD 20104				20104	15309	03^{h} 17^{m} 31.54^{s}	+65° 39′ 30.1″	6.41	0.10	596	A2V + A4V	Double star
HD 40956				40956	28951	06^{h} 06^{m} 39.20^{s}	+63° 27′ 13.7″	6.42	0.90	414	G9III	has a planet (b)
HD 79517				79517	45764	09^{h} 19^{m} 55.78^{s}	+74° 01′ 00.3″	6.42	1.14	370	G8III	
HD 21903				21903	16712	03^{h} 35^{m} 01.04^{s}	+60° 02′ 29.0″	6.43	2.69	183	F3V	
HD 32518				32518	24003	05^{h} 09^{m} 36.62^{s}	+69° 38′ 22.4″	6.44	1.09	383	K1III	Mago, has a planet (b)
18 Cam		18		36066	25973	05^{h} 32^{m} 33.68^{s}	+57° 13′ 17.8″	6.44	3.23	143	F8V	
HD 21769				21769	16587	03^{h} 33^{m} 32.19^{s}	+58° 45′ 55.3″	6.45	−0.40	763	A4III	
HD 65299				65299	40559	08^{h} 16^{m} 53.96^{s}	+84° 03′ 27.7″	6.45	0.24	568	A3IV	
HD 23594				23594	17858	03^{h} 49^{m} 19.73^{s}	+57° 07′ 06.0″	6.46	0.40	531	B9V	
HD 29329				29329	22152	04^{h} 46^{m} 00.39^{s}	+76° 36′ 40.9″	6.46	3.92	105	F7V	
HD 118686				118686	66251	13^{h} 34^{m} 42.81^{s}	+76° 32′ 48.1″	6.46	−1.03	1025	K5III:	
HD 57742				57742	36211	07^{h} 27^{m} 25.84^{s}	+66° 19′ 53.66″	6.47	−0.72	893	B9V	
HD 34450				34450	25322	05^{h} 24^{m} 59.43^{s}	+73° 42′ 25.9″	6.48	−1.45	1254	M0.5IIIbBa0.5	Slow irregular variable ΔV = 0.64^{m}
39 Cam		39		41782	29348	06^{h} 11^{m} 13.63^{s}	+60° 27′ 12.7″	6.48	−1.47	1268	M2III	Slow irregular variable ΔV = 1.18^{m}
HD 21203				21203	16177	03^{h} 28^{m} 23.56^{s}	+60° 15′ 20.6″	6.49	−0.61	858	B9V + A1	
HD 25225				25225	19222	04^{h} 07^{m} 10.77^{s}	+74° 00′ 01.29″	6.49	1.00	409	G8III	
14 Cam		14		33296	24348	05^{h} 13^{m} 31.29^{s}	+62° 41′ 28.1″	6.49	1.91	268	A7Vn	
HD 38058				38058	27346	05^{h} 47^{m} 32.26^{s}	+63° 35′ 55.85″	6.49	0.64	482	G9III	
HD 52030				52030	34238	07^{h} 05^{m} 51.67^{s}	+70° 43′ 54.93″	6.49	−0.58	847	K5III	has an unconfirmed planet (b)
HD 40568				40568	28656	06^{h} 03^{m} 04.31^{s}	+57° 01′ 06.3″	6.50	0.31	565	G7-8III	
49 Cam		49	BC	62140	37934	07^{h} 46^{m} 27.46^{s}	+62° 49′ 50.4″	6.50	1.95	265	F0p SrEu	BC Cam; α^{2} CVn variable, ΔV = 0.05^{m}, P = 4.285 d
29 Cam		29		38618	27592	05^{h} 50^{m} 33.89^{s}	+56° 55′ 08.2″	6.53	0.88	441	A4IV-V	
HD 44385				44385	31231	06^{h} 33^{m} 04.0^{s}	+78° 58′ 46″	6.60		698	K3III	has a planet (b)
6 Cam		6		31189	22994	04^{h} 56^{m} 49.48^{s}	+55° 49′ 26.8″	6.63	0.39	874	K4III	
HD 24064				24064	18451	03^{h} 56^{m} 36.0^{s}	+74° 04′ 48″	6.75	-0.36	862	K4III	has a planet (b)
28 Cam		28		38129	27283	05^{h} 46^{m} 54.60^{s}	+56° 55′ 26.4″	6.79	0.39	622	A7V	
22 Cam		22		37070	26587	05^{h} 39^{m} 05.39^{s}	+56° 21′ 37.3″	7.03	3.14	196	F5	
20 Cam		20		36770	26426	05^{h} 37^{m} 27.04758^{s}	+56° 29′ 16.1335″	7.45	1.37	1,163	G8II-III	
HD 35759				35759	25883	05^{h} 31^{m} 33.0^{s}	+64° 16′ 58″	7.74	3.44	236	F9/G0V	has a planet (b)
HD 29021				29021	21571	04^{h} 37^{m} 52.2^{s}	+60° 40′ 34″	7.76		100	G5V	has a planet (b)
Gliese 445						11^{h} 47^{m} 41.39^{s}	+78° 41′ 28.2″	10.8		17.6		
Table legend: • Name = Proper name • B = Bayer designation • F or/and G. = Flamsteed designation or Gould designation • Var = Variable-star designation • HD = Henry Draper Catalogue designation number • HIP = Hipparcos Catalogue designation number • RA = Right ascension for the Epoch/Equinox J2000.0 • Dec = Declination for the Epoch/Equinox J2000.0 • vis. mag. = visual magnitude (m or m_{v}), also known as apparent magnitude • abs. mag. = absolute magnitude (M_{v}) • Dist. (ly) = Distance in light-years from Earth • Sp. class = Spectral class of the star in the stellar classification system • Notes = Common name(s) or alternate name(s); comments; notable properties [for example: multiple star status, range of variability if it is a variable star, exoplanets, etc.]

== See also ==
- List of stars by constellation

== Sources ==
- ESA (1997). "The Hipparcos and Tycho Catalogues".
- Kostjuk, N. D. (2002). "HD-DM-GC-HR-HIP-Bayer-Flamsteed Cross Index".
- Roman, N. G. (1987). "Identification of a Constellation from a Position".
- Samus, N. N.; Durlevich, O. V.; et al. (2004). "Combined General Catalogue of Variable Stars (GCVS4.2)".
- Samus, N. N.; Durlevich, O. V.; et al. (2012). "General Catalog of Variable Stars (GCVS database, version 2012Feb)".
