= PPM Star Catalogue =

Astronomical catalogue

The PPM Star Catalogue (Positions and Proper Motions Star Catalogue) is the successor of the SAO Catalogue. It contains precise positions and proper motions of 378,910 stars on the whole sky in the J2000/FK5 coordinate system. It is designed to represent as closely as possible the IAU (1976) coordinate system on the sky, as defined by the FK5 star catalogue. Thus, the PPM is an extension of the FK5 system to higher star densities and fainter magnitudes.

== Description ==
The PPM can be considered a replacement of two preceding astrometric catalogs which served a similar purpose: AGK3 and the SAO Catalog. In contrast to the PPM, these older catalogs are based on (1) the now obsolete FK4 system of positions and proper motions, and (2) only two position measures per star.

While the SAO catalog is more or less complete to V=9, with 4,503 stars fainter than V=10, the PPM catalog is fairly complete to V=9.5, with 102,672 stars fainter than V=10 and 22,395 stars fainter than V=11. Released after the original PPM, the PPM supplemental list was intended to render the PPM complete to magnitude V=7.5. For fainter magnitudes, the supplemental list documentation states that,

... of the perhaps 20,000 stars between V=7.5 and V=8.5 only a few hundred are missing from PPM. So, the combined PPM can be considered as practically complete to at least V=8.5. In photographic magnitudes this corresponds to roughly 9 mag.

The data contained in the catalogue is downloadable from NASA (and other sites). The four files of the catalog are PPM North, PPM South, Bright Star Supplement to PPM, and The 90000 stars Supplement to the PPM Catalogue.

== See also ==
- SAO Catalogue
- FK5
