= HR 4646 =

HR 4646 may refer to:

- N Camelopardalis (N Cam, HD 106112), an A5V dwarf star in the constellation Camelopardalis, 108 lightyears distant
- "Debt Free America Act", a U.S. House of Representatives private members bill introduced by Chaka Fattah concerning tax reform on financial transaction tax
