= HD 33266 =

Star in the constellation Camelopardalis

Observation data Epoch J2000.0 Equinox J2000.0 (ICRS)
- Constellation: Camelopardalis
- Right ascension: 05^{h} 13^{m} 02.8149^{s}
- Declination: +61° 51′ 00.146″
- Apparent magnitude (V): 6.17±0.01

Characteristics
- Evolutionary stage: main sequence
- Spectral type: A2IV
- U−B color index: +0.08
- B−V color index: +0.04

Astrometry
Radial velocity (R_{v})	−4.4±2.9 km/s
Proper motion (μ)	RA: −12.154 mas/yr Dec.: +2.135 mas/yr
Parallax (π)	6.7795±0.0364 mas
Distance	481 ± 3 ly (147.5 ± 0.8 pc)
Absolute magnitude (M_{V})	+0.58

Details
Mass	2.45^{+0.32}_{−0.34} M_{☉}
Radius	3.14±0.08 R_{☉}
Luminosity	49.7 L_{☉}
Surface gravity (log g)	3.83^{+0.07}_{−0.06} cgs
Temperature	8,952 K
Metallicity [Fe/H]	0.00 dex
Rotational velocity (v sin i)	15±1 km/s
Age	340 Myr

Other designations
- AG+61°422, BD+61°766, GC 6345, HD 33266, HIP 24313, HR 1675, SAO 13409

Database references
SIMBAD	data

HD 33266 (HR 1675) is a solitary star in the northern circumpolar constellation Camelopardalis. It has an apparent magnitude of 6.17, making it faintly visible to the naked eye. Located 481 light years away, it is approaching the Sun with a heliocentric radial velocity of −4.4 km/s.

HD 33266 is an A-type star with 2.45 times the mass of the Sun and 3.14 times the radius of the Sun. Although its spectral type of A2IV gives a luminosity class typical for a subgiant, stellar evolution models and its position in the Hertzsprung–Russell diagram place it on the main sequence. It shines at 49.7 L_{☉} from its photosphere at an effective temperature of 8,952 K, giving it a white glow, at an age of 340 million years. Its metallicity − elements heavier than helium − is at solar level. It spins slowly with a projected rotational velocity of 15 km/s and has been identified as an Am star.
