= HD 31134 =

Star in the constellation of Camelopardalis

- Location of HD 31134 on the map (circled)

Observation data Epoch J2000.0 Equinox J2000.0 (ICRS)
- Constellation: Camelopardalis
- Right ascension: 04^{h} 56^{m} 07.07238^{s}
- Declination: +52° 52′ 11.0544″
- Apparent magnitude (V): 5.74±0.01

Characteristics
- Evolutionary stage: main sequence
- Spectral type: A2 Vs or A1 Vp
- U−B color index: +0.11
- B−V color index: +0.09

Astrometry
Radial velocity (R_{v})	−15.1±2.5 km/s
Proper motion (μ)	RA: −3.418 mas/yr Dec.: +14.954 mas/yr
Parallax (π)	6.8897±0.1144 mas
Distance	473 ± 8 ly (145 ± 2 pc)
Absolute magnitude (M_{V})	+0.19

Details
Mass	2.74±0.05 M_{☉}
Radius	4.38±0.22 R_{☉}
Luminosity	103^{+13}_{−11} L_{☉}
Surface gravity (log g)	3.85 cgs
Temperature	8,690 K
Metallicity [Fe/H]	−0.11 dex
Rotational velocity (v sin i)	60±1 km/s
Age	432 Myr

Other designations
- AG+52°472, BD+52°898, GC 5988, HD 31134, HIP 22936, HR 1561, SAO 24919

Database references
SIMBAD	data

HD 31134, also designated as HR 1561, is a solitary star located in the northern circumpolar constellation Camelopardalis, the giraffe. It is faintly visible to the naked eye as a white-hued star with an apparent magnitude of 5.74. Gaia DR3 parallax measurements place it 473 light years away. It appears to be approaching the Solar System with a heliocentric radial velocity of −15.1 km/s. At its current distance, HD 31134's brightness is diminished by 0.35 magnitudes due to interstellar dust. It has an absolute magnitude of +0.19.

The object has a stellar classification of A2 Vs, indicating that it is an A-type main-sequence star with sharp or narrow absorption lines due to slow rotation. Two sources remove the s prefix and instead list it as an ordinary dwarf star while one lists it as a more evolved giant star. Abt and Morell (1995) list it as a slightly hotter peculiar Ap star, but it is now considered unlikely to be chemically peculiar. It has 2.74 times the mass of the Sun and an enlarged radius of 4.38 R_{☉}. It radiates 103 times the luminosity of the Sun from its photosphere at an effective temperature of 8,690 K. HD 31134 is a rather evolved star, having completed 97.6% of its main sequence lifetime at the age of 432 million years. Consistent with its spectrum, it spins modestly with a projected rotational velocity of 60 km/s.
