= UGC 3730 =

Galaxy in the constellation Camelopardalis

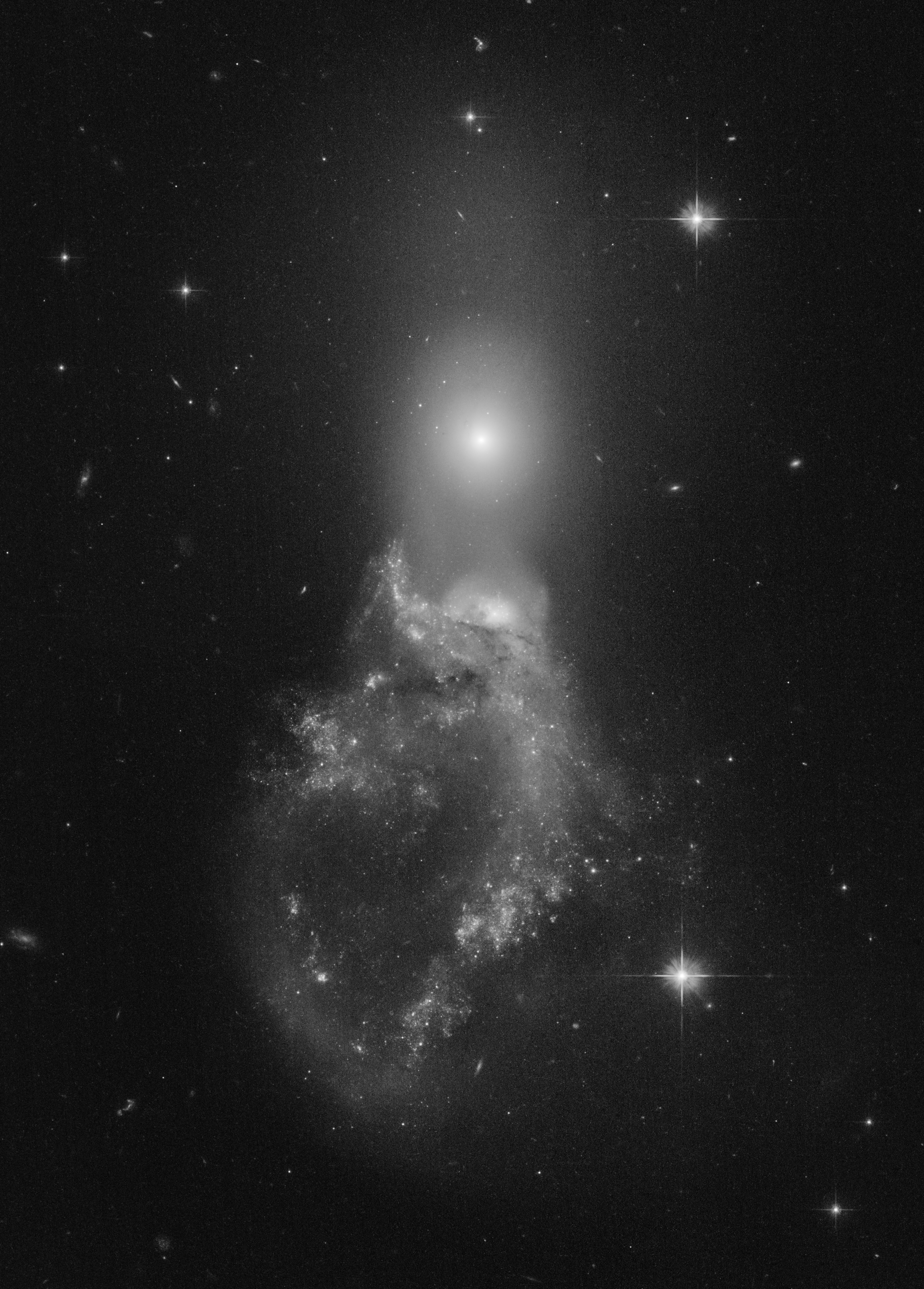
- UGC 3730 by Hubble Space Telescope

Observation data (J2000 epoch)
- Constellation: Camelopardalis
- Right ascension: 07^{h} 14^{m} 20.4^{s}
- Declination: +73° 28′ 37″
- Redshift: 0.009030 ± 0.000005
- Heliocentric radial velocity: 2,707 ± 1 km/s
- Distance: 132 ± 9 Mly (40.5 ± 2.8 Mpc)
- Apparent magnitude (V): 13.2

Characteristics
- Type: S0 pec + Ring
- Apparent size (V): 2.8′ × 1.5′
- Notable features: Collisional ring

Other designations
- Arp 141, VV 123, CGCG 330-033, MCG +12-07-035, PGC 20460

UGC 3730 or Arp 141 is a ring galaxy in the constellation Camelopardalis. The galaxy lies about 130 million light years away from Earth, which means, given its apparent dimensions, that UGC 3730 is approximately 110,000 light years across. The galaxy is included in Halton Arp's Atlas of Peculiar Galaxies in the elliptical galaxies emanating material category.

UGC 3730 has been the result of galaxy interaction. The interaction has led one galaxy to turn into an asymmetric ring. The companion, a lenticular galaxy, lies along the major axis of the ring and it is estimated to have a larger mass than the ring galaxy. The nucleus of the ring galaxy lies between the ring and companion galaxy. Emission has been observed in the interior of the ring as well as between the ring galaxy and the companion galaxy and stars have been tidally stripped from the ring galaxy. The star formation rate of the ring galaxy is estimated to be 0.26 M_{☉} per year. The total stellar mass of the galaxy is estimated to be 8.3×10^{9} M_{☉} and the total gas mass to be 4.9×10^{9} M_{☉}.

UGC 3730 forms a pair with UGC 3705 which lies 9.4 arcminutes away. Both galaxies are part of the LGG 141 galaxy group, which also includes UGC 3697, UGC 3714, UGC 3804, UGC 3838, UGC 3878, UGC 3626, UGC 3644, and UGC 3701.
