= HD 24141 =

Am star?; Camelopardalis

- Location of HD 24141 on the map (circled)

Observation data Epoch J2000.0 Equinox J2000.0 (ICRS)
- Constellation: Camelopardalis
- Right ascension: 03^{h} 53^{m} 43.28625^{s}
- Declination: +57° 58′ 30.5263″
- Apparent magnitude (V): 5.79±0.01

Characteristics
- Evolutionary stage: main sequence
- Spectral type: kA3hF0mF0 or A7 V
- U−B color index: +0.11
- B−V color index: +0.18

Astrometry
Radial velocity (R_{v})	−0.2±0.6 km/s
Proper motion (μ)	RA: +86.826 mas/yr Dec.: −91.295 mas/yr
Parallax (π)	18.5633±0.0352 mas
Distance	175.7 ± 0.3 ly (53.9 ± 0.1 pc)
Absolute magnitude (M_{V})	+2.28

Position (relative to HD 24141A)
Component	HD 24141B
Epoch of observation	J2000.0
Angular distance	1.02″
Position angle	69°
Projected separation	52.3 AU

Details
Mass	1.92 M_{☉}
Radius	1.72±0.09 R_{☉}
Luminosity	10.66±0.04 L_{☉}
Surface gravity (log g)	4.28^{+0.08}_{−0.07} cgs
Temperature	8,518±290 K
Metallicity [Fe/H]	−0.02 dex
Rotational velocity (v sin i)	53±10 km/s
Age	15 Myr

Other designations
- AG+57°437, BD+57°752, FK5 1105, GC 4668, HD 24141, HIP 18217, HR 1192, SAO 24276, WDS J03537+5759AB

Database references
SIMBAD	data

HD 24141, also known as HR 1192, is a star located in the northern constellation Camelopardalis, the giraffe. It is faintly visible to the naked eye as a white-hued point of light with an apparent magnitude of 5.79. The object is located relatively close at a distance of 176 light-years based on Gaia DR3 parallax measurements and it is slowly drifting closer with a heliocentric radial velocity of −0.2 km/s. At its current distance, HD 24141's brightness is diminished by 0.17 magnitudes due to interstellar extinction and it has an absolute magnitude of +2.28.

It is not entirely certain whether HD 24141 is an Am star or not. One stellar classification is kA3hF0mF0, which indicates that it is an Am star with the calcium K-lines of an A3 star and the hydrogen and metallic lines of a F0 star. However, Abt & Levy (1985) gave a class of A7 V, indicating that it is instead an ordinary A-type main-sequence star. HD 24141 has 1.92 times the mass of the Sun and it is estimated to be only 15 million years old. It radiates 10.66 times the luminosity of the Sun from its photosphere at an effective temperature of 8,518 K. These parameters correspond to a radius that is 72% larger than the Sun's. HD 24141 has a near-solar metallicity at [Fe/H] = −0.02 and it spins modestly with a projected rotational velocity of 53 km/s.

Most sources generally agree that HD 24141 is a solitary star. A 2014 multiplicity survey found a 7th magnitude companion with a mass of 0.77 M_{☉} located 1.02" away from the star along a position angle of 69°. Another 15th magnitude companion designated as C is located 1216″ away along a position angle of 187°. The object appears to share the same proper motion as HD 24141, but the Gaia DR3 parallax is different and it is considered very unlikely that the two are physically associated.
