= HD 26755 =

Binary star system in Camelopardalis

- Location of HD 26755 on the map (circled)

Observation data Epoch J2000.0 Equinox ICRS
- Constellation: Camelopardalis
- Right ascension: 04^{h} 17^{m} 08.09353^{s}
- Declination: +57° 51′ 37.1513″
- Apparent magnitude (V): 5.72±0.01

Characteristics
- Evolutionary stage: red clump
- Spectral type: K1 III
- B−V color index: +1.09

Astrometry
Radial velocity (R_{v})	−38.2±1.6 km/s
Proper motion (μ)	RA: +29.108 mas/yr Dec.: −25.942 mas/yr
Parallax (π)	12.0207±0.1939 mas
Distance	271 ± 4 ly (83 ± 1 pc)
Absolute magnitude (M_{V})	+1.21

Orbit
Primary	A
Name	B
Period (P)	1,658.7±2.9 d
Eccentricity (e)	0.309±0.005
Periastron epoch (T)	2,453,848±5 JD
Argument of periastron (ω) (secondary)	31.2±1.2°
Semi-amplitude (K_{1}) (primary)	6.10±0.04 km/s

Details
Mass	1.68 M_{☉}
Radius	9.44±0.47 R_{☉}
Luminosity	42.5±1.3 L_{☉}
Surface gravity (log g)	2.58±0.11 cgs
Temperature	4,717±92 K
Metallicity [Fe/H]	+0.17±0.05 dex
Rotational velocity (v sin i)	1±1 km/s
Age	2.13 Gyr

Other designations
- AG+57°460, BD+57°787, GC 5139, HD 26755, HIP 19983, HR 1313, SAO 24514

Database references
SIMBAD	data

HD 26755, also known as HR 1313, is a spectroscopic binary located in the northern circumpolar constellation Camelopardalis, the giraffe. It has an apparent magnitude of 5.72, making it faintly visible to the naked eye under ideal conditions. Gaia DR3 parallax measurements place the system at a distance of 271 light years and is currently drifting closer with a heliocentric radial velocity of −38 km/s. At its current distance, HD 26755's brightness is diminished by 0.19 magnitudes due to interstellar dust.

The visible component is an evolved red giant with a stellar classification of K1 III. It is estimated to be 2.13 billion years old, enough time for the star to exhaust its core hydrogen and evolve to become a red giant. It has cooled and expanded to 9.4 times the Sun's radius. It has 1.68 times the mass of the Sun and radiates 42.5 times the luminosity of the Sun from its enlarged photosphere at an effective temperature of 4,717 K, giving it an orange hue when viewed in the night sky. HD 26755 is a metal enriched star with an iron abundance 48% greater than the Sun. It spins slowly with a projected rotational velocity of 1 km/s, which is poorly constrained.
