= HD 22764 =

Double star; Camelopardalis

- Location of HD 22764 on the map (circled)

Observation data Epoch J2000.0 Equinox J2000.0 (ICRS)
- Constellation: Camelopardalis
- Right ascension: 03^{h} 42^{m} 42.73699^{s}
- Declination: +59° 58′ 09.8029″
- Apparent magnitude (V): 5.78

Characteristics
- Spectral type: K3.5 IIIb + G
- U−B color index: +1.78
- B−V color index: +1.76
- R−I color index: +1.02

Astrometry
Radial velocity (R_{v})	−12.53±0.26 km/s
Proper motion (μ)	RA: −2.124 mas/yr Dec.: +2.342 mas/yr
Parallax (π)	1.8433±0.0671 mas
Distance	1,770 ± 60 ly (540 ± 20 pc)
Absolute magnitude (M_{V})	−4.47
Absolute bolometric magnitude (M_{bol})	−4.52±0.30

Details
Mass	2.86 or 6.8±1 M_{☉}
Radius	167±8 R_{☉}
Luminosity	3,342±221 L_{☉}
Surface gravity (log g)	1.08 or 1.41 cgs
Temperature	3,928±170 K
Metallicity [Fe/H]	−0.19 dex
Rotational velocity (v sin i)	<1.9 km/s
Age	820 or 47±8 Myr

Other designations
- AG+59°378, BD+59°699, HD 22764, HIP 17342, HR 1112, SAO 24169, WDS J03427+5958A

Database references
SIMBAD	data

HD 22764, also known as HR 1112, is an orange hued star located in the northern circumpolar constellation Camelopardalis. It has an apparent magnitude of 5.78, allowing it to be faintly visible to the naked eye. The object is located relatively far at a distance of approximately 1,770 light years based on Gaia DR3 parallax measurements but is approaching the Solar System with a heliocentric radial velocity of −12.5 km/s. At its current distance, HD 22764's brightness is diminished by 0.66 magnitudes due to interstellar dust.

The object has two stellar classifications; one states that it is an ageing red giant (K3.5 IIIb) while the other instead lists it as a slightly cooler lower luminosity red supergiant (K4 Ib). The first spectrum hints a close companion to the object of spectral type G. If considered as a supergiant, it has 6.8 times the mass of the Sun; if considered as an older giant star, it has a mass of 2.86 M_{☉}. As a result of its evolved state, HD 22764 has expanded to 167 times the Sun's radius and now radiates 3,342 times the luminosity of the Sun from its photosphere at an effective temperature of 3,928 K. Age estimates range from 47 up to 820 million years. It has an iron abundance 65% that of the Sun, making it metal deficient. The object spins leisurely with a projected rotational velocity lower than 1.9 km/s.

HD 22764 is the primary of a binary star consisting of it and HD 22763, a B8 giant star located 54.8" away along a position angle of 38°. There are also 4 line-of-sight companions located near the system.
