= HD 50885 =

Star in the constellation of Camelopardalis

Observation data Epoch J2000 Equinox ICRS
- Constellation: Camelopardalis
- Right ascension: 07^{h} 01^{m} 21.41899^{s}
- Declination: +70° 48′ 29.8635″
- Apparent magnitude (V): 5.69±0.01

Characteristics
- Evolutionary stage: red giant branch
- Spectral type: K4 III
- U−B color index: +1.52
- B−V color index: +1.34

Astrometry
| Radial velocity (R_{v}) | −17.8±0.2 km/s |
| Proper motion (μ) | RA: +13.101 mas/yr Dec.: −15.749 mas/yr |
| Parallax (π) | 6.3572±0.0481 mas |
| Distance | 513 ± 4 ly (157 ± 1 pc) |
| Absolute magnitude (M_{V}) | −0.27 |

Details
| Mass | 1.32±0.82 M_{☉} |
| Radius | 30.43 R_{☉} |
| Luminosity | 203±3 L_{☉} |
| Surface gravity (log g) | 1.99 cgs |
| Temperature | 4,396±122 K |
| Metallicity [Fe/H] | +0.01 dex |
| Age | 292 Myr |

Other designations
- AG+70°299, BD+70°430, GC 9152, HD 50885, HIP 33827, HR 2581, SAO 6041, WDS J07014+7049A

Database references
| SIMBAD | data |

HD 50885, also known as HR 2581, is a star located in the northern circumpolar constellation Camelopardalis, the giraffe. It has an apparent magnitude of 5.69, making it faintly visible to the naked eye if viewed under ideal conditions. Based on parallax measurements from Gaia DR3, the object is estimated to be 513 light years distant. It appears to be approaching the Solar System with a heliocentric radial velocity of −17.8 km/s.

This is a solitary, evolved red giant star with a stellar classification of K4 III. It is currently on the red giant branch, fusing a hydrogen shell around an inert helium core. It has 1.32 times the mass of the Sun but has expanded to 30.4 times its girth. It radiates 203 times the luminosity of the Sun from its photosphere at an effective temperature of 4,396 K. HD 50885 has an iron abundance only 102% that of the Sun, placing it at solar metallicity.

There is an optical companion located 119″ away along a position angle of 357°. This object was first noticed by Robert S. Ball in 1879
