= HD 21819 =

A-type main-sequence star; Camelopardalis

- Location of HD 21819 on the map (circled)

Observation data Epoch J2000.0 Equinox ICRS
- Constellation: Camelopardalis
- Right ascension: 03^{h} 33^{m} 39.06000^{s}
- Declination: +54° 58′ 29.4970″
- Apparent magnitude (V): 5.97±0.01

Characteristics
- Evolutionary stage: main sequence
- Spectral type: A3 V or A2 Vp
- B−V color index: +0.11

Astrometry
Radial velocity (R_{v})	−6.5±1.5 km/s
Proper motion (μ)	RA: −41.053 mas/yr Dec.: −0.357 mas/yr
Parallax (π)	13.1723±0.0317 mas
Distance	247.6 ± 0.6 ly (75.9 ± 0.2 pc)
Absolute magnitude (M_{V})	+1.62

Details
Mass	2.00^{+0.19}_{−0.15} M_{☉}
Radius	2.06±0.10 R_{☉}
Luminosity	30.6^{+2.2}_{−2.0} L_{☉}
Surface gravity (log g)	4.08 cgs
Temperature	9,000 K
Metallicity [Fe/H]	−0.17 dex
Rotational velocity (v sin i)	160±8 km/s
Age	737±102 Myr

Other designations
- AG+54°370, BD+54°693, GC 4229, HD 21819, HIP 16599, HR 1073, SAO 24099, TIC 316848255

Database references
SIMBAD	data

HD 21819, also designated as HR 1073, is a solitary star located in the northern circumpolar constellation Camelopardalis. It has an apparent magnitude of 5.97, making faintly visible to the naked eye under ideal conditions. The object is located relatively close at a distance of 248 light-years based on Gaia DR3 parallax measurements and it is drifting closer with a heliocentric radial velocity of −6.5 km/s. At its current distance, HD 21819's brightness is diminished by an interstellar extinction of 0.17 magnitudes and it has an absolute magnitude of +1.62.

HD 21819 has a stellar classification of A3 V, indicating that it is an ordinary A-type main-sequence star that is generating energy via hydrogen fusion at its core. Abt & Morell (1995) gave a slightly hotter star of A2 Vp, indicating that it is instead an Ap star with weak magnesium lines. It has twice the mass of the Sun and 2.06 times the radius of the Sun. It radiates 30.6 times the luminosity of the Sun from its photosphere at an effective temperature of 9,000 K, giving it a white hue when viewed in the night sky. HD 21819 is metal deficient with an iron abundance of [Fe/H] = −0.17 or 67.6% of the Sun's and it is estimated to be 737 million years old, having completed 55.7% of its main sequence lifetime. Like most hot stars it spins rapidly, having a projected rotational velocity of 160 km/s.
