= 51 Camelopardalis =

K-type giant in the constellation Camelopardalis

- Location of 51 Cam on the map (circled)

Observation data Epoch J2000.0 Equinox ICRS
- Constellation: Camelopardalis
- Right ascension: 07^{h} 46^{m} 40.07812^{s}
- Declination: +65° 27′ 20.4266″
- Apparent magnitude (V): 5.93±0.01

Characteristics
- Spectral type: K2 III
- B−V color index: +1.18

Astrometry
Radial velocity (R_{v})	−30.9±0.2 km/s
Proper motion (μ)	RA: +27.601 mas/yr Dec.: +17.656 mas/yr
Parallax (π)	9.7528±0.0372 mas
Distance	334 ± 1 ly (102.5 ± 0.4 pc)
Absolute magnitude (M_{V})	+0.92

Details
Mass	1.08 M_{☉}
Radius	11.8^{+0.3}_{−0.9} R_{☉}
Luminosity	57.2±0.4 L_{☉}
Surface gravity (log g)	2.25 cgs
Temperature	4,626±122 K
Metallicity [Fe/H]	+0.00 dex
Age	9.25 Gyr

Other designations
- 51 Cam, AG+65°409, BD+65°593, FK5 2602, GC 10420, HD 62066, HIP 37949, HR 2975, SAO 14321

Database references
SIMBAD	data

51 Camelopardalis (51 Cam), also designated as HD 62066, is a solitary star located in the northern circumpolar constellation Camelopardalis. It is faintly visible to the naked eye as an orange-hued point of light with an apparent magnitude of 5.93. Gaia DR3 parallax measurements imply a distance of 334 light-years and it is currently receding with a heliocentric radial velocity of −30.9 km/s. At its current distance, 51 Cam's brightness is diminished by 0.17 magnitudes due to interstellar extinction and it has an absolute magnitude of +0.92.

51 Cam has a stellar classification of K2 III, indicating that it is an evolved K-type giant star. It has a comparable mass to the Sun but it has more than twice the latter's age at 9.25 billion years. As a result, it has exhausted hydrogen at its core and it has expanded to 11.8 times the radius of the Sun. It radiates 57.2 times the luminosity of the Sun from its enlarged photosphere at an effective temperature of 4,626 K. 51 Cam has a solar metallicity at [Fe/H] = +0.00.
