= HD 23523 =

Visual binary; Camelopardalis

- Location of HD 23523 on the map (circled)

Observation data Epoch J2000.0 Equinox ICRS
- Constellation: Camelopardalis
- Right ascension: 03^{h} 49^{m} 36.58592^{s}
- Declination: +63° 17′ 49.0518″
- Apparent magnitude (V): 5.82 (6.31 + 7.11)

Characteristics
- Spectral type: A5 Vn
- B−V color index: +0.18

Astrometry
Radial velocity (R_{v})	−9.6±3.4 km/s
Proper motion (μ)	RA: −11.630 mas/yr Dec.: −61.457 mas/yr
Parallax (π)	13.9498±0.3245 mas
Distance	234 ± 5 ly (72 ± 2 pc)
Absolute magnitude (M_{V})	+1.55 (combined)

Orbit
Primary	HD 23523A
Name	HD 23523B
Period (P)	10.180±0.509 yr
Semi-major axis (a)	0.1020±0.0031″
Eccentricity (e)	0.441

Details

A
Mass	1.75 or 1.81 M_{☉}

B
Mass	1.64 or 1.51 M_{☉}

Other designations
- Moaï 1, AG+63°280, BD+62°612, GC 4560, HD 23523, HIP 17891, HR 1158, SAO 12917, WDS J03496+6318AB

Database references
SIMBAD	data

HD 23523 (HR 1158) is a binary star located in the northern circumpolar constellation Camelopardalis. It has a combined apparent magnitude of 5.82, making it faintly visible to the naked eye under ideal conditions. When resolved, the primary has an apparent magnitude of 6.31 while the secondary has a magntiude of 7.11. The system is located relatively close at a distance of about 234 light-years based on Gaia DR3 parallax measurements and it currently drifting closer with a somewhat heliocentric radial velocity of −9.6 km/s. At its current distance, HD 23523's combined brightness is diminished by 0.16 magnitudes due to interstellar extinction and it has a combined absolute magnitude of +1.55.

The system was first discovered to be a double star in 1996 by Marcel Carbillet and colleagues after speckle interferometry observations. The stars are only about a tenth of an arcsecond apart, making observing their individual properties difficult. The discovery paper suggested that the two components might be equal based on the dynamical mass. Overall, HD 23523 has a stellar classification of A5 Vn, indicating that it is an A-type main-sequence star with broad or nebulous absorption lines due to rapid rotation. The primary has a mass either 1.75 or 1.81 times the mass of the Sun while the companion has a mass 1.64 or 1.51 times that of the Sun, depending on the approach.
