= HD 37289 =

Star in the constellation of Camelopardalis

Observation data Epoch J2000.0 Equinox ICRS
- Constellation: Camelopardalis
- Right ascension: 05^{h} 42^{m} 26.44853^{s}
- Declination: +65° 41′ 51.5374″
- Apparent magnitude (V): 5.61±0.01

Characteristics
- Evolutionary stage: red giant branch
- Spectral type: K5 III
- B−V color index: +1.24

Astrometry
Radial velocity (R_{v})	−20.7±0.2 km/s
Proper motion (μ)	RA: −0.243 mas/yr Dec.: −21.572 mas/yr
Parallax (π)	10.5949±0.0594 mas
Distance	308 ± 2 ly (94.4 ± 0.5 pc)
Absolute magnitude (M_{V})	+1.01

Details
Mass	3.30±0.04 M_{☉}
Radius	13.57 R_{☉}
Luminosity	69.9 L_{☉}
Surface gravity (log g)	2.29 cgs
Temperature	4,360±90 K
Metallicity [Fe/H]	0.00 dex
Age	293^{+27}_{−28} Myr

Other designations
- AG+65°313, BD+65°485, FK5 2426, GC 7068, HD 37289, HIP 26882, HR 1916, SAO 13570

Database references
SIMBAD	data

HD 37289, also known as HR 1916, is a solitary, orange hued star located in the northern circumpolar constellation Camelopardalis. It has an apparent magnitude of 5.61, making it faintly visible to the naked eye under ideal conditions. Based on parallax measurements from the Gaia spacecraft, the object is estimated to be 308 light years distant. It appears to be approaching the Sun, having a heliocentric radial velocity of −20.7 km/s.

HD 37289 has a stellar classification of K5 III, indicating that it is an evolved red giant. Gaia DR3 stellar evolution models place it on the red giant branch. This means that it is currently fusing a hydrogen shell around an inert helium core. At present it has 3.3 times the mass of the Sun and at the age of 293 million years, it has expanded to a radius of 13.6 R_{☉}. It radiates at 70 times the luminosity of the Sun from its enlarged photosphere at an effective temperature of 4,360 K. HD 37289 has been calculated to have a metallicity approximately around solar level.
