= HD 120565 =

Spectroscopic binary in the constellation Camelopardalis

- Location of HD 120565 on the map (circled)

Observation data Epoch J2000.0 Equinox ICRS
- Constellation: Camelopardalis
- Right ascension: 13^{h} 42^{m} 23.18342^{s}
- Declination: +82° 45′ 08.7103″
- Apparent magnitude (V): 5.91±0.01

Characteristics
- Evolutionary stage: red giant branch
- Spectral type: G9 III
- B−V color index: +1.01

Astrometry
Radial velocity (R_{v})	−45.2±1.2 km/s
Proper motion (μ)	RA: +29.995 mas/yr Dec.: −43.734 mas/yr
Parallax (π)	8.8109±0.0364 mas
Distance	370 ± 2 ly (113.5 ± 0.5 pc)
Absolute magnitude (M_{V})	+0.48

Details
Mass	2.70±0.11 M_{☉}
Radius	10.8^{+0.3}_{−0.2} R_{☉}
Luminosity	64.1±0.5 L_{☉}
Surface gravity (log g)	2.47 cgs
Temperature	4,993±122 K
Metallicity [Fe/H]	−0.20 dex
Rotational velocity (v sin i)	2.6±1 km/s
Age	503^{+75}_{−70} Myr

Other designations
- AG+83°357, BD+83°397, FK5 1643, GC 18611, HD 120565, HIP 66878, HR 5203, SAO 2266

Database references
SIMBAD	data

HD 120565, also designated as HR 5203, is a star located in the northern circumpolar constellation Camelopardalis. It is faintly visible to the naked eye as an orange-hued point of light with an apparent magnitude of 5.91. Gaia DR3 parallax measurements imply a distance of 370 light-years and it is currently drifting closer with a heliocentric radial velocity of −45.2 km/s. At its current distance, HD 120565's brightness is diminished by 0.12 magnitudes due to interstellar extinction and it has an absolute magnitude of +0.48.

HD 120565 has a stellar classification of G9 III, indicating that it is an evolved G-type giant star. It has 2.7 times the mass of the Sun but at the age of 503 million years, it has expanded to 10.8 times the radius of the Sun. It radiates 64.1 times the luminosity of the Sun from its enlarged photosphere at an effective temperature of 4,993 K. HD 120565 is metal deficient with an iron abundance 63.1% that of the Sun's or [Fe/H] = −0.22, and it spins modestly with a projected rotational velocity of 2.6 km/s. It was determined to be a single-lined spectroscopic binary by J.R. De Mederios and J. R. P. da Silva based on radial velocity variations.
