= HD 117566 =

High proper motion star; Camelopardalis

- Location of HD 117566 on the map (circled)

Observation data Epoch J2000.0 Equinox J2000.0 (ICRS)
- Constellation: Camelopardalis
- Right ascension: 13^{h} 26^{m} 56.80348^{s}
- Declination: +78° 38′ 37.9324″
- Apparent magnitude (V): 5.74±0.01

Characteristics
- Evolutionary stage: subgiant
- Spectral type: G3 IIIb Fe−1 CH1
- U−B color index: +0.35
- B−V color index: +0.77

Astrometry
Radial velocity (R_{v})	13.7±0.3 km/s
Proper motion (μ)	RA: −140.497 mas/yr Dec.: +30.403 mas/yr
Parallax (π)	11.1974±0.0417 mas
Distance	291 ± 1 ly (89.3 ± 0.3 pc)
Absolute magnitude (M_{V})	+1.03

Details
Mass	2.29 M_{☉}
Radius	7.2±0.4 R_{☉}
Luminosity	38.2±0.3 L_{☉}
Surface gravity (log g)	3.69±0.18 cgs
Temperature	5,420±26 K
Metallicity [Fe/H]	+0.03 dex
Rotational velocity (v sin i)	8.9±1 km/s
Age	760±50 Myr

Other designations
- AG+78°340, BD+79°422, FK5 3075, GC 18223, HD 117566, HIP 65595, HR 5091, SAO 7821

Database references
SIMBAD	data

HD 117566, also known as HR 5091, is a solitary yellow-hued star located in the northern circumpolar constellation Camelopardalis. It has an apparent magnitude of 5.74, making it faintly visible to the naked eye. This object is relatively close at a distance of 291 light years based on Gaia DR3 parallax measurements but is receding with a heliocentric radial velocity of 14 km/s. At its current distance, HD 117566's brightness is diminished by 0.12 magnitudes due to interstellar dust.

HD 117566 has a stellar classification of G3 IIIb Fe−1 CH1, indicating that it is a G-type giant with an under-abundance of iron and an overabundance of the CH radical in its spectrum. Its evolutionary stage is unclear. A 1994 paper places it in the Hertzsprung gap, indicating it has ceased hydrogen core fusion and is now evolving toward the red giant branch (RGB), and Gaia Data Release 3 models agree that it is a subgiant. It has 2.29 times the mass of the Sun and, at the age of 760 million years, it has expanded to 7.2 times the Sun's radius. It radiates 38.2 times the luminosity of the Sun from its photosphere at an effective temperature of 5,420 K. HD 117566 has a solar metallicity and spins modestly with a projected rotational velocity of 9 km/s.
