= 20 Camelopardalis =

Star in the constellation Camelopardalis

Observation data Epoch J2000.0 Equinox ICRS
- Constellation: Camelopardalis
- Right ascension: 05^{h} 37^{m} 27.0446^{s}
- Declination: +56° 29′ 16.086″
- Apparent magnitude (V): 7.45±0.01

Characteristics
- Evolutionary stage: horizontal branch
- Spectral type: G8 II-III
- U−B color index: +0.69
- B−V color index: +0.98

Astrometry
Radial velocity (R_{v})	−50.3±2.3 km/s
Proper motion (μ)	RA: −0.534 mas/yr Dec.: −7.186 mas/yr
Parallax (π)	3.7078±0.1769 mas
Distance	880 ± 40 ly (270 ± 10 pc)
Absolute magnitude (M_{V})	+1.39

Details
Mass	1.83 M_{☉}
Radius	12.54 R_{☉}
Luminosity	142 L_{☉}
Surface gravity (log g)	2.79 cgs
Temperature	5,064 K
Metallicity [Fe/H]	−0.03 dex

Other designations
- 20 Cam, AG+56°533, BD+56°1041, GC 6947, HD 36770, HIP 26426, SAO 25277

Database references
SIMBAD	data

20 Camelopardalis (20 Cam) is a solitary star in the circumpolar constellation Camelopardalis. It has an apparent magnitude of 7.45, making it readily visible in binoculars but not to the naked eye. Located about 880 light years away, it is approaching the Solar System with a radial velocity of −50.3 km/s. Due to its faintness, 20 Cam is one of the 220 Flamsteed stars without Bright Star Catalog designations.

20 Cam is a red clump giant star with a spectral classification of G8 II-III. It has a measured angular diameter of 0.44 mas, with an actual radius of 13 R_{☉} at its estimated distance. It has 1.83 times the mass of the Sun and shines at 142 times the luminosity of the Sun from its enlarged photosphere at an effective temperature of 5,064 K, giving it a yellow glow. 20 Cam's metallicity – elements heavier than helium – is around solar level.
