= HD 28204 =

Spectroscopic binary in the constellation Camelopardalis

- Location of HD 28204 on the map (circled)

Observation data Epoch J2000.0 Equinox J2000.0 (ICRS)
- Constellation: Camelopardalis
- Right ascension: 04^{h} 33^{m} 30.68009^{s}
- Declination: +72° 31′ 42.9803″
- Apparent magnitude (V): 5.93±0.01

Characteristics
- Evolutionary stage: main sequence
- Spectral type: kA8 hF0 mF2
- U−B color index: +0.16
- B−V color index: +0.28

Astrometry
| Radial velocity (R_{v}) | 9.0±0.9 km/s |
| Proper motion (μ) | RA: +30.055 mas/yr Dec.: −90.625 mas/yr |
| Parallax (π) | 9.8596±0.0214 mas |
| Distance | 330.8 ± 0.7 ly (101.4 ± 0.2 pc) |
| Absolute magnitude (M_{V}) | +0.91 |

Orbit
| Period (P) | 4.1950 d |
| Eccentricity (e) | 0.040±0.029 |
| Inclination (i) | 28-43° |
| Periastron epoch (T) | 2,426,034.6450 JD |
| Argument of periastron (ω) (secondary) | 337±244° |
| Semi-amplitude (K_{1}) (primary) | 31.3 km/s |

Details

Aa
| Mass | 1.68 M_{☉} |
| Radius | 3.48±0.18 R_{☉} |
| Luminosity | 35.7±0.2 L_{☉} |
| Surface gravity (log g) | 3.58^{+0.10}_{−0.06} cgs |
| Temperature | 7,320±157 K |
| Metallicity [Fe/H] | −0.14 dex |
| Rotational velocity (v sin i) | 23±10 km/s |
| Age | 1.103 Gyr |

Ab
| Mass | 0.474 M_{☉} |

Other designations
- AG+72°116, BD+72°227A, FK5 2333, GC 5478, HD 28204, HIP 21247, HR 1401, SAO 5238, ADS 3267 A, CCDM J04335+7232A, WDS J04335+7232A, TIC 103566595

Database references
| SIMBAD | data |

HD 28204, also designated as HR 1401, is a spectroscopic binary located in the northern circumpolar constellation Camelopardalis. It has an apparent magnitude of 5.93, making it faintly visible to the naked eye under ideal conditions. Gaia DR3 parallax measurements imply a distance of 331 light-years and it is currently receding with a heliocentric radial velocity of 9 km/s. At its current distance, HD 28204's brightness is diminished by 0.18 magnitudes due to interstellar extinction and it has an absolute magnitude of +0.91.

HD 28204 is a single-lined spectroscopic binary consisting of an Am star and an unseen companion, as the primary is the only one detectable in the spectrum. With a mass of 0.474 M_{☉}, the companion might be a K-type main-sequence star. Both stars take 4.2 days to revolve around each other in a nearly circular orbit, which is somewhat constrained. HD 28204 has two optical companions: a 12th magnitude star located 39" away along a position angle of 257° and a 14th magnitude star located 27.3" along a position angle of 55°.

The visible component has a stellar classification of kA8hF0mF2, indicating that it is an Am star with the calcium K-lines of an A8 star, the hydrogen lines of a F0 star, and the metallic lines of a F2 star. It has 1.68 times the mass of the Sun and an enlarged radius 3.48 times that of the Sun. It radiates 35.7 times the luminosity of the Sun from its photosphere at an effective temperature of 7,320 K, giving it the typical white hue of an A-type star. It is slightly metal deficient with an iron abundance of [Fe/H] = −0.15 or 72% that of the Sun's. Like many Am stars it spins slowly, having a projected rotational velocity of 23 km/s.
