= HD 32356 =

Astrometric binary in Camelopardalis

- Location of HD 32356 on the map (circled)

Observation data Epoch J2000.0 Equinox ICRS
- Constellation: Camelopardalis
- Right ascension: 05^{h} 06^{m} 29.70999^{s}
- Declination: +61° 10′ 11.0995″
- Apparent magnitude (V): 5.99±0.01

Characteristics
- Spectral type: K5 II
- B−V color index: +1.36

Astrometry
Radial velocity (R_{v})	−45.2±1.2 km/s
Proper motion (μ)	RA: +39.428 mas/yr Dec.: −80.907 mas/yr
Parallax (π)	5.8511±0.0881 mas
Distance	557 ± 8 ly (171 ± 3 pc)
Absolute magnitude (M_{V})	+0.23

Details
Mass	1.18 M_{☉}
Radius	30.67±1.58 R_{☉}
Luminosity	300^{+9}_{−8} L_{☉}
Surface gravity (log g)	1.56±0.11 cgs
Temperature	4,111±13 K
Metallicity [Fe/H]	−0.30±0.05 dex
Rotational velocity (v sin i)	<1.0 km/s
Age	4.27^{+0.86}_{−0.72} Gyr

Other designations
- AG+61°416, BD+60°857, GC 6202, HD 32356, HIP 23766, HR 1624, SAO 13369, TIC 286710338

Database references
SIMBAD	data

HD 32356, also designated as HR 1624, is an astrometric binary located in the northern circumpolar constellation Camelopardalis, the giraffe, near β Camelopardalis. The visible component is faintly visible to the naked eye as an orange-hued star with an apparent magnitude of 5.99. Gaia DR3 parallax measurements imply a distance of 557 light-years and it is currently drifting closer with a heliocentric radial velocity of −45.2 km/s. At its current distance, HD 32356's brightness is diminished by an interstellar extinction of 0.29 magnitudes and it has an absolute magnitude of +0.23.

The visible component has a stellar classification of K5 II, indicating that it is an evolved K-type bright giant that has ceased hydrogen fusion at its core and left the main sequence. It has 1.18 times the mass of the Sun but at the age of 4.27 billion years, it has expanded to 30.67 times the radius of the Sun. It radiates 300 times the luminosity of the Sun from its enlarged photosphere at an effective temperature of 4,111 K. HD 32356 A is metal deficient with an iron abundance roughly half of the Sun's and it spins too slowly for its projected rotational velocity to be measured accurately.
