= HD 29678 =

A-type dwarf; Camelopardalis

- Location of HD 29678 on the map (circled)

Observation data Epoch J2000.0 Equinox J2000.0 (ICRS)
- Constellation: Camelopardalis
- Right ascension: 04^{h} 48^{m} 50.35317^{s}
- Declination: +75° 56′ 28.3916″
- Apparent magnitude (V): 5.95±0.01

Characteristics
- Evolutionary stage: main sequence
- Spectral type: A9/F0 IV or A6 V
- U−B color index: −0.04
- B−V color index: +0.27

Astrometry
Radial velocity (R_{v})	−6.0±3.7 km/s
Proper motion (μ)	RA: +37.476 mas/yr Dec.: −133.853 mas/yr
Parallax (π)	21.0142±0.0265 mas
Distance	155.2 ± 0.2 ly (47.59 ± 0.06 pc)
Absolute magnitude (M_{V})	+2.60

Details
Mass	1.54 M_{☉}
Radius	1.73±0.09 R_{☉}
Luminosity	7.54^{+0.04}_{−0.06} L_{☉}
Surface gravity (log g)	4.20^{+0.09}_{−0.07} cgs
Temperature	7,502±255 K
Metallicity [Fe/H]	−0.26 dex
Rotational velocity (v sin i)	120 km/s
Age	146 Myr

Other designations
- AG+75°168, BD+75°189, FK5 173, GC 5774, HD 29678, HIP 22361, HR 1491, SAO 5309, CCDM J04489+7557A, WDS J04488+7556A, TIC 140682376

Database references
SIMBAD	data

HD 29678, also known as HR 1491, is a solitary star located in the northern circumpolar constellation Camelopardalis. It is faintly visible to the naked eye as a yellowish-white hued point of light with an apparent magnitude of 5.95. The object is located relatively close at a distance of 155 light-years and it is drifting closer with a somewhat constrained heliocentric radial velocity of approximately −6.0 km/s. At is current distance, HD 29678's brightness is diminished by 0.13 magnitudes due to interstellar extinction and it has an absolute magnitude of +2.60. Its observed kinematics suggest that it is a member of the Pleiades supercluster.

HD 29678 has a stellar classification of A9/F0 IV, indicating that it is a slightly evolved star that has the characteristics of an A9 and F0 subgiant. Adams et al. (1935) yields a class of A6 V, indicating that it is instead a hotter A-type main-sequence star that is generating energy via hydrogen fusion at is core. It has 1.54 times the mass of the Sun and 1.73 times the radius of the Sun. It radiates 7.54 times the luminosity of the Sun from its photosphere at an effective temperature of 7,502 K. The above characteristics more closely match a main sequence star and Gaia DR3 models the object as such. HD 29678 is metal-deficient with an iron abundance of [Fe/H] = −0.26 or 55% of the Sun's and it is estimated to be 146 million years old. Like many hot stars it spins rapidly, having a projected rotational velocity of 120 km/s.

HD 29678 has a 13th magnitude optical companion located 98.6" away along a position angle of 46°. HD 29678 itself is an unrelated field star of the HIP 21974 cluster.
