= HD 27322 =

A-type dwarf; Camelopardalis

- Location of HD 27322 on the map (circled)

Observation data Epoch J2000.0 Equinox J2000.0 (ICRS)
- Constellation: Camelopardalis
- Right ascension: 04^{h} 21^{m} 51.80623^{s}
- Declination: +56° 30′ 22.7351″
- Apparent magnitude (V): 5.92±0.01

Characteristics
- Evolutionary stage: main sequence
- Spectral type: A3 V or A2 IV-V
- U−B color index: +0.08
- B−V color index: +0.11

Astrometry
Radial velocity (R_{v})	−13±5 km/s
Proper motion (μ)	RA: −14.793 mas/yr Dec.: +7.466 mas/yr
Parallax (π)	10.4168±0.0907 mas
Distance	313 ± 3 ly (96.0 ± 0.8 pc)
Absolute magnitude (M_{V})	+0.98

Details

A
Mass	1.9±0.1 M_{☉}
Radius	2.64^{+0.11}_{−0.10} R_{☉}
Luminosity	54.7^{+1.0}_{−0.9} L_{☉}
Surface gravity (log g)	3.88±0.14 cgs
Temperature	8,414^{+176}_{−173} K
Metallicity [Fe/H]	−0.25 dex
Rotational velocity (v sin i)	130±8 km/s
Age	640 Myr

B
Mass	1.30±0.04 M_{☉}
Temperature	6,492±109 K
Metallicity [Fe/H]	−0.50 dex
Rotational velocity (v sin i)	20 km/s

Other designations
- AG+56°463, BD+56°509, GC 5253, HD 27322, HIP 20380, HR 1342, SAO 24563

Database references
SIMBAD	data

HD 27322, also known as HR 1342, is a binary star located in the northern circumpolar constellation Camelopardalis. The visible component is faintly visible to the naked eye as a white-hued point of light with an apparent magnitude of 5.92. The object is located relatively close at a distance of 313 light-years based on Gaia DR3 parallax measurements, and it is drifting closer with a heliocentric radial velocity of approximately −13 km/s. At its current distance, HD 27322's brightness is diminished by 0.24 magnitudes due to interstellar extinction and it has an absolute magnitude of +0.98.

HD 27322 A has a stellar classification of A3 V, indicating that it is an ordinary A-type main-sequence star that is generating energy via hydrogen fusion at its core. Abt & Morell (1995) gave a hotter and slightly more evolved classification of A2 IV-V, indicating that it is an A-type star with a luminosity class intermediate between a main sequence star and a subgiant. At the age of 640 million years, HD 27322 A has completed 79.5% of its main sequence lifetime. It has 1.9 times the mass of the Sun and 2.64 times the radius of the Sun. It radiates 54.7 times the luminosity of the Sun from its photosphere at an effective temperature of 8,414 K. HD 27322 A is metal deficient with an iron abundance 56% that of the Sun's ([Fe/H] = −0.25) and it spins rapidly with a projected rotational velocity of 130 km/s.

The object was generally classified as a solitary star. However, evidence of HD 27322 being a binary first arose when an X-ray emission with a luminosity of 3.22×10^{20} W was detected around the star. A-type stars are expected to be X-ray quiet, so it might be coming from a hidden companion. A 2016 spectroscopic survey detected a companion around HD 27322. It has 1.3 times the mass of the Sun and it has an effective temperature of 6,492 K. HD 27322 B is metal deficient with a [Fe/H] of −0.5 and it spins modestly with a projected rotational velocity of 20 km/s.
