= HD 33541 =

Spectroscopic binary; Camelopardalis

- Location of HD 33541 on the map (circled)

Observation data Epoch J2000.0 Equinox ICRS
- Constellation: Camelopardalis
- Right ascension: 05^{h} 18^{m} 13.24213^{s}
- Declination: +73° 16′ 05.1509″
- Apparent magnitude (V): 5.83±0.01

Characteristics
- Evolutionary stage: main sequence
- Spectral type: A0 V
- U−B color index: −0.12
- B−V color index: −0.04

Astrometry
Radial velocity (R_{v})	9.9±3.2 km/s
Proper motion (μ)	RA: −2.361 mas/yr Dec.: −28.254 mas/yr
Parallax (π)	9.0993±0.0488 mas
Distance	358 ± 2 ly (109.9 ± 0.6 pc)
Absolute magnitude (M_{V})	+0.58

Orbit
Primary	HD 33541A
Name	HD 33541B
Period (P)	20.8199180±0.0000458 d
Eccentricity (e)	0.245±0.006
Periastron epoch (T)	2,457,388.471+0.002 −0.003 JD
Argument of periastron (ω) (secondary)	108±1°
Semi-amplitude (K_{1}) (primary)	39.3±0.3 km/s
Semi-amplitude (K_{2}) (secondary)	38.0±0.3 km/s

Details
Mass	2.69±0.35 M_{☉}
Radius	2.52±0.13 R_{☉}
Luminosity	69.3±0.9 L_{☉}
Surface gravity (log g)	4.09^{+0.07}_{−0.05} cgs
Temperature	11,200 K
Metallicity [Fe/H]	−0.15 dex
Rotational velocity (v sin i)	70 km/s
Age	300 Myr

Other designations
- AG+73°141, BD+73°280, GC 6405, HD 33541, HIP 24732, HR 1683, SAO 5483

Database references
SIMBAD	data

HD 33541, also known as HR 1683, is a white-hued star located in the northern circumpolar constellation Camelopardalis. It has an apparent magnitude of 5.83, making it faintly visible to the naked eye. Gaia DR3 parallax measurements imply a distance of 358 light years and it is currently receding with a heliocentric radial velocity of 9.9 km/s. At its current distance HD 33541's brightness is diminished by 0.16 magnitudes due to interstellar extinction and it has an absolute magnitude of +0.58.

The object has a stellar classification of A0 V, indicating that it is an ordinary A-type main-sequence star. It has 2.69 times the mass of the Sun and 2.52 times the Sun's radius. It radiates 69.3 times the luminosity of the Sun from its photosphere at an effective temperature of 11,200 K. HD 33541 has an iron abundance 71% that of the Sun ([Fe/H] = −0.15) and it is estimated to be 300 million years old. The star spins modestly with a projected rotational velocity of 70 km/s.

HD 33541 was originally considered to be a solitary star. However, Abt & Morell (1995) suggested that HD 33541 may be a close binary with two components that each have rotational velocities of 10 km/s. A later paper gives the rotational velocity of the primary as 60 km/s and of the secondary 11 km/s. It is now considered to be a spectroscopic binary with a period of 20.8 hours and a somewhat eccentric orbit based on Gaia DR3 models.
