= HD 58425 =

Binary star in the constellation Camelopardalis

Observation data Epoch J2000.0 Equinox ICRS
- Constellation: Camelopardalis
- Right ascension: 07^{h} 30^{m} 52.66467^{s}
- Declination: +68° 27′ 56.3270″
- Apparent magnitude (V): 5.64±0.01

Characteristics
- Evolutionary stage: red giant branch
- Spectral type: K2 III
- B−V color index: +1.11

Astrometry
Radial velocity (R_{v})	58.6±0.2 km/s
Proper motion (μ)	RA: −2.031 mas/yr Dec.: −42.687 mas/yr
Parallax (π)	6.9858±0.2644 mas
Distance	470 ± 20 ly (143 ± 5 pc)
Absolute magnitude (M_{V})	−0.05

Details
Mass	1.74±0.52 M_{☉}
Radius	24.7 R_{☉}
Luminosity	199^{+24}_{−22} L_{☉}
Surface gravity (log g)	2.4±0.1 cgs
Temperature	4,479±62 K
Metallicity [Fe/H]	−0.42±0.04 dex
Age	3.55^{+0.52}_{−0.46} Gyr

Other designations
- AG+68°343, BD+68°480, FK5 284, GC 9985, HD 58425, HIP 36528, HR 2830, SAO 14211

Database references
SIMBAD	data

HD 58425, also known as HR 2830, is an astrometric binary (100% chance) located in the northern circumpolar constellation Camelopardalis. It is faintly visible to the naked eye as an orange point of light at an apparent magnitude of 5.64. Based on parallax measurements from Gaia DR3, the system is estimated to be 470 light years away from Earth. It appears to be rapidly receding from the Sun, having a heliocentric radial velocity of 58.6 km/s.

The visible component is an evolved, RGB star with a stellar classification of K2 III. It has 1.74 times the mass of the Sun and is said to be 3.55 billion years old. At this age, the object has expanded to 24.7 times the radius of the Sun and now radiates nearly 200 times the luminosity of the Sun from its enlarged photosphere at an effective temperature of 4,479 K. HD 58425 A has an iron abundance only 38% that of the Sun's, making it metal deficient.
