= UGC 3478 =

Galaxy in the constellation Camelopardalis

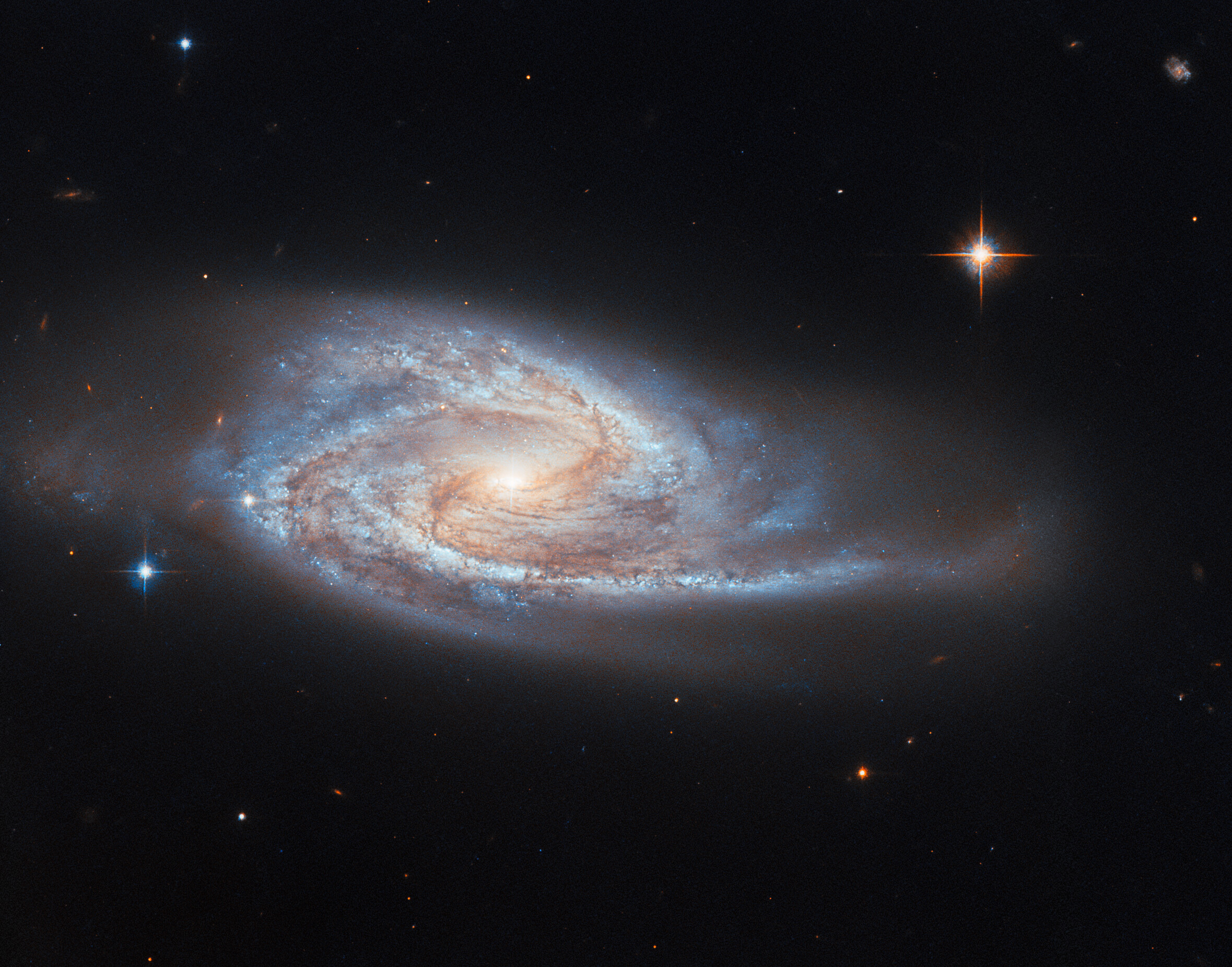
- UGC 3478 imaged by the Hubble Space Telescope

Observation data (J2000 epoch)
- Constellation: Camelopardalis
- Right ascension: 06^{h} 32^{m} 47.173^{s}
- Declination: +63° 40′ 25.28″
- Redshift: 0.01271338
- Heliocentric radial velocity: 3787 ± 150
- Distance: 142.10 ± 1.71 Mly (43.567 ± 0.524 Mpc)
- Apparent magnitude (B): 13.3

Characteristics
- Type: Sb

Other designations
- IRAS 06280+6342, 2MASX J06324716+6340250, MCG +11-08-054, PGC 19228, CGCG 308-030

UGC 3478 is a spiral galaxy located in the constellation of Camelopardalis. Its velocity with respect to the cosmic microwave background is 3,849±8 km/s, which corresponds to a Hubble distance of 185.2 ± 13.0 Mly (56.77 ± 3.98 Mpc). However, three non-redshift measurements give a closer mean distance of 142.10 ± 1.71 Mly (43.567 ± 0.524 Mpc). The first known reference to this galaxy comes from Part 1 of the Morphological Catalogue of Galaxies, published in 1962, where it is listed as MCG +11-08-054.

UGC 3478 features a growing supermassive black hole (AGN) at its center.
