= HD 28780 =

A-type star in the constellation Camelopardalis

- Location of HD 28780 on the map (circled)

Observation data Epoch J2000.0 Equinox ICRS
- Constellation: Camelopardalis
- Right ascension: 04^{h} 36^{m} 24.19802^{s}
- Declination: +64° 15′ 41.7609″
- Apparent magnitude (V): 5.91±0.01

Characteristics
- Evolutionary stage: main sequence
- Spectral type: A1 V or A1 III
- U−B color index: −0.02
- B−V color index: −0.03

Astrometry
Radial velocity (R_{v})	−22.6±1.8 km/s
Proper motion (μ)	RA: −25.398 mas/yr Dec.: −8.119 mas/yr
Parallax (π)	6.6785±0.0412 mas
Distance	488 ± 3 ly (149.7 ± 0.9 pc)
Absolute magnitude (M_{V})	+0.26

Details
Mass	2.48±0.08 M_{☉}
Radius	3.79^{+0.12}_{−0.13} R_{☉}
Luminosity	101±2 L_{☉}
Surface gravity (log g)	3.67^{+0.06}_{−0.08} cgs
Temperature	9,616^{+134}_{−132} K
Metallicity [Fe/H]	−0.21 dex
Rotational velocity (v sin i)	41.3±2.0 km/s
Age	300^{+21}_{−19} Myr

Other designations
- AG+64°277, BD+63°515, FK5 2336, GC 5574, HD 28780, HIP 21452, HR 1440, SAO 13196

Database references
SIMBAD	data

HD 28780, also known as HR 1440, is a solitary white-hued star located in the northern circumpolar constellation Camelopardalis. It has an apparent magnitude of 5.91, making it faintly viisble to the naked eye under ideal conditions. Gaia DR3 parallax measurements imply a distance of 488 light-years, and it is currently drifting closer with a heliocentric radial velocity of −22.6 km/s. At its current distance, HD 28780's brightness is diminished by 0.33 magnitudes due to interstellar extinction and it has an absolute magnitude of +0.26.

HD 28780 has a stellar classification of A1 V, indicating that it is an ordinary A-type main-sequence star that is generating energy via hydrogen fusion at its core. However, Abt & Morell (1995) gave a classification of A1 III, indicating that it is an evolved A-type giant star that has exhausted hydrogen fusion at its core. At the age of 300 million years, HD 28780 has completed 80.2% of its main sequence lifetime. It has 2.48 times the mass of the Sun and a slightly enlarged radius 3.79 times larger than the Sun's. The star radiates 101 times the luminosity of the Sun from its photosphere at an effective temperature of 9,616 K. HD 28780 is metal deficient with an iron abundance 61.7% that of the Sun's ([Fe/H] = −0.21) and unlike most hot stars, it spins modestly with a projected rotational velocity of 41.3 km/s.
