= HD 64307 =

Star in the constellation of Camelopardalis

Observation data Epoch J2000.0 Equinox ICRS
- Constellation: Camelopardalis
- Right ascension: 08^{h} 00^{m} 11.7385^{s}
- Declination: +73° 55′ 04.5036″
- Apparent magnitude (V): 5.35±0.01

Characteristics
- Evolutionary stage: red giant branch
- Spectral type: K3 III
- U−B color index: +1.64
- B−V color index: +1.43

Astrometry
Radial velocity (R_{v})	33.54±0.19 km/s
Proper motion (μ)	RA: −8.194 mas/yr Dec.: −37.514 mas/yr
Parallax (π)	4.7407±0.0741 mas
Distance	690 ± 10 ly (211 ± 3 pc)
Absolute magnitude (M_{V})	−1.77

Details
Mass	1.19 M_{☉}
Radius	49.9 R_{☉}
Luminosity (bolometric)	892 L_{☉}
Surface gravity (log g)	1.18 cgs
Temperature	4,264±122 K
Metallicity [Fe/H]	−0.1 dex
Rotational velocity (v sin i)	<2 km/s

Other designations
- AG+74°195, BD+74°338, FK5 300, GC 10745, HD 64307, HIP 39117, HR 3075, SAO 6378

Database references
SIMBAD	data

HD 64307, also known as HR 3075, is a solitary, orange hued star located in the northern circumpolar constellation Camelopardalis. It has an apparent magnitude of 5.35, allowing it to be faintly seen with the naked eye. Based on parallax measurements from the Gaia spacecraft, The object is estimated to be 690 light years distant. It appears to be receding from the Sun, having a heliocentric radial velocity of 34 km/s.

HD 64307 is an evolved star with a stellar classification of K3 III. Gaia DR3 stellar evolution models place it on the red giant branch. It has a mass comparable to the Sun but due to its evolved state, it has an enlarged radius of 49.9 R_{☉}. It shines with a bolometric luminosity of 892 L_{☉} from its photosphere at an effective temperature of 4,264 K. HD 64307 has an iron abundance 80% that of the Sun, and is also lithium enriched. Like most giant stars, the object spins slowly, having a projected rotational velocity lower than 2 km/s.
