= HD 115337 =

Star in the constellation Camelopardalis

Observation data Epoch J2000.0 Equinox J2000.0
- Constellation: Camelopardalis
- Right ascension: 13^{h} 12^{m} 25.43269^{s}
- Declination: +80° 28′ 16.7089″
- Apparent magnitude (V): 6.25 (6.33 + 9.04)

Characteristics
- Spectral type: G8 III + A8 V:
- B−V color index: +0.94

Astrometry
| Radial velocity (R_{v}) | −9.38±0.21 km/s |
| Proper motion (μ) | RA: −6.288 mas/yr Dec.: +10.446 mas/yr |
| Parallax (π) | 4.6717±0.0166 mas |
| Distance | 698 ± 2 ly (214.1 ± 0.8 pc) |
| Absolute magnitude (M_{V}) | −0.32 |

Details

A
| Mass | 3.4 M_{☉} |
| Radius | 16.4 R_{☉} |
| Luminosity | 161 L_{☉} |
| Surface gravity (log g) | 2.38 cgs |
| Temperature | 5,160 K |
| Metallicity [Fe/H] | −0.13 dex |
| Rotational velocity (v sin i) | <1 km/s |
| Age | 270 Myr |

Other designations
- AG+80°289, BD+81 416, FK5 3056, GC 17932, HD 115337, HIP 64437, HR 5009, SAO 2164, WDS J13124+8028A

Database references
| SIMBAD | data |

HD 115337 is a binary star located in the northern circumpolar constellation Camelopardalis. The pair have a combined apparent magnitude of 6.25, placing it near the limit for naked eye visibility. Parallax measurements place the system at a distance of 698 light years. It has a heliocentric radial velocity of −9.4 km/s, indicating that it is drifting towards the Solar System.

Optical measurements from Mason et al. (2001) find the pair to have a mean separation of an arcsecond along a position angle of 184°. The components have spectral classifications of K0 Ib and A8 V, indicating a K-type lower luminosity supergiant and an A-type main-sequence star (with uncertainty). At present the primary has 3.4 times the mass of the Sun and an enlarged radius of 16.4 R_{☉} due to its evolved status. It radiates 161 times the luminosity of the Sun from its photosphere at an effective temperature of 5,160 K, giving a yellowish orange hue. HD 115337A is metal deficient, having an iron abundance only 74% of solar levels. Like most giants and supergiants, it spins slowly with a projected rotational velocity of less than 1 km/s.

The physical characteristics of HD 115337A belong to a giant star as opposed to a supergiant. It has often been classified as G5 III or G8 III, more consistent with the above properties.

== See also ==
- Red supergiant
