= HD 27245 =

Star in the constellation Camelopardalis

- Location of HD 27245 on the map (circled)

Observation data Epoch J2000.0 Equinox ICRS
- Constellation: Camelopardalis
- Right ascension: 04^{h} 21^{m} 47.64917^{s}
- Declination: +60° 44′ 08.2461″
- Apparent magnitude (V): 5.40±0.01

Characteristics
- Spectral type: M0 III
- B−V color index: +1.50
- Variable type: suspected

Astrometry
Radial velocity (R_{v})	+25.2±0.3 km/s
Proper motion (μ)	RA: +55.890 mas/yr Dec.: −114.046 mas/yr
Parallax (π)	5.3716±0.0848 mas
Distance	607 ± 10 ly (186 ± 3 pc)
Absolute magnitude (M_{V})	−0.27

Details
Mass	1.18 M_{☉}
Radius	52.8±2.7 R_{☉}
Luminosity	570±16 L_{☉}
Surface gravity (log g)	1.29 cgs
Temperature	4,033±122 K
Metallicity [Fe/H]	+0.11 dex

Other designations
- 25 H. Camelopardalis, NSV 1558, AG+60°426, BD+60°800, FK5 2317, GC 5244, HD 27245, HIP 20376, HR 1335, SAO 13113

Database references
SIMBAD	data

HD 27245, also known as HR 1335 or rarely 25 H. Camelopardalis is a solitary red-hued star located in the northern circumpolar constellation Camelopardalis. It has an apparent magnitude of 5.4, making it faintly visible to the naked eye. Gaia DR3 Parallax measurements place it approximately 607 light years away from it the Solar System and is drifting further away with a heliocentric radial velocity of 25.2 km/s. At its current distance, HD 27245's brightness is diminished by 0.36 magnitudes due to extinction from interstellar dust. It has an absolute magnitude of −0.27.

HD 27245 is an aging red giant with a stellar classification of M0 III. It has 118% the mass of the Sun but has expanded to a radius of 52.8 R_{☉}. It radiates 570 times the luminosity of the Sun from its enlarged photosphere at an effective temperature of 4,033 K. HD 27245's iron abundance is 129% that of the Sun's, making it metal enriched.

HD 27245 is a suspected variable star with an amplitude of 0.05 magnitudes. Its variability was first observed in 1930 by Joel Stebbins. However, Eggen (1967) instead lists it as an ordinary M-type giant and used the object for comparison. In 1978–9, HD 28245 was again listed as a variable star but did not provide further insight. As of 2017, the star has not been confirmed to be variable.
