= HD 25274 =

M-type giant in the constellation Camelopardalis

- Location of HD 25274 on the map (circled)

Observation data Epoch J2000.0 Equinox ICRS
- Constellation: Camelopardalis
- Right ascension: 04^{h} 06^{m} 03.18286^{s}
- Declination: +68° 40′ 47.8990″
- Apparent magnitude (V): 5.86±0.01

Characteristics
- Spectral type: M0 III
- B−V color index: +1.54

Astrometry
Radial velocity (R_{v})	−48.23±0.26 km/s
Proper motion (μ)	RA: +7.555 mas/yr Dec.: +2.938 mas/yr
Parallax (π)	5.4653±0.0455 mas
Distance	597 ± 5 ly (183 ± 2 pc)
Absolute magnitude (M_{V})	−0.51

Details
Radius	59.8^{+1.6}_{−1.5} or 39.6^{+1.2}_{−5.9} R_{☉}
Luminosity	762^{+26}_{−22} L_{☉}
Surface gravity (log g)	1.22 cgs
Temperature	3,985±122 K
Metallicity [Fe/H]	−0.21±0.09 dex
Rotational velocity (v sin i)	2.2±1.2 km/s

Other designations
- AG+68°213, BD+68°303, FK5 2291, GC 4874, HD 25274, HIP 19129, HR 1241, SAO 13006

Database references
SIMBAD	data

HD 25274, also known as HR 1241, is a solitary star located in the northern circumpolar constellation Camelopardalis. It is faintly visible to the naked eye as a red hued point of light with an apparent magnitude of 5.86. Gaia DR3 parallax measurements imply a distance of 597 light-years and it is currently drifting closer with a heliocentric radial velocity of −48.23 km/s. At its current distance, HD 25274's brightness is diminished by three-tenths of a magnitude due to interstellar extinction and it has an absolute magnitude of −0.51.

HD 25274 has a stellar classification of M0 III, indicating that it is an evolved red giant. However, the Bright Star Catalog gives a hotter classification of K2 III. The spectrophotometry-measured angular diameter, after correcting for limb darkening, is 2.02±0.03 mas. At the estimated distance for HD 25274, this yields a physical radius 39.8 times that of the Sun. It also has an empirical radius of 48.1 R_{☉} and Gaia DR3 models a larger radius. The object radiates 762 times the luminosity of the Sun from its enlarged photosphere at an effective temperature of 3,985 K. HD 25274 is metal deficient with an iron abundance 62% that of the Sun's ([Fe/H] = −0.21) and it spins modestly with a projected rotational velocity of 2.2 km/s. HD 25274 is a field star of the HIP 21974 cluster.
