= HD 46509 =

Distant K-type giant; Camelopardalis

- Location of HD 46509 on the map (circled)

Observation data Epoch J2000.0 Equinox J2000.0 (ICRS)
- Constellation: Camelopardalis
- Right ascension: 06^{h} 40^{m} 32.25255^{s}
- Declination: +71° 44′ 55.6296″
- Apparent magnitude (V): 5.86±0.01

Characteristics
- Evolutionary stage: red giant branch
- Spectral type: G9 III or K0 III
- B−V color index: +1.19

Astrometry
| Radial velocity (R_{v}) | −24.02±0.19 km/s |
| Proper motion (μ) | RA: +4.653 mas/yr Dec.: +11.103 mas/yr |
| Parallax (π) | 4.1248±0.0376 mas |
| Distance | 791 ± 7 ly (242 ± 2 pc) |
| Absolute magnitude (M_{V}) | −0.98 |

Details
| Mass | 5.64±1.82 M_{☉} |
| Radius | 27.3±0.6 R_{☉} |
| Luminosity | 399±7 L_{☉} |
| Surface gravity (log g) | 2.34±0.11 cgs |
| Temperature | 4,675±92 K |
| Metallicity [Fe/H] | +0.12±0.05 dex |
| Rotational velocity (v sin i) | 1.5±1.2 km/s |
| Age | 339^{+78}_{−63} Myr |

Other designations
- AG+71°216, BD+71°359, FK5 2511, GC 8630, HD 46509, HIP 31946, HR 2396, SAO 5925

Database references
| SIMBAD | data |

HD 46509, also designated as HR 2396, is a solitary star located in the northern circumpolar constellation Camelopardalis, the giraffe. It is faintly visible to the naked eye as a yellowish-orange hued point of light with an apparent magnitude of 5.86. The object is located relatively far at a distance of 791 light-years based on Gaia DR3 parallax measurements, but it is drifting closer with a heliocentric radial velocity of −24.02 km/s. At its current distance, HD 46509's brightness is diminished by interstellar extinction of 0.31 magnitudes and it has an absolute magnitude of −0.98.

HD 46509 has a stellar classification of either G9 III or K0 III, with both classes indicating that it is an evolved red giant. It is estimated to be 339 million years old, enough time for it to cool and expand to 27.3 times the radius of the Sun. HD 46509 has about 5.6 times the mass of the Sun and it radiates 399 times the luminosity of the Sun from its enlarged photosphere at an effective temperature of 4,675 K. It is metal enriched with an iron abundance 132% that of the Sun's ([Fe/H] = +0.12) and like most giant stars, it spins slowly with a projected rotational velocity of approximately 1.5 km/s.
