= HD 68375 =

Star in the constellation of Camelopardalis

Observation data Epoch J2000.0 Equinox ICRS
- Constellation: Camelopardalis
- Right ascension: 08^{h} 19^{m} 32.2891^{s}
- Declination: +75° 45′ 24.866″
- Apparent magnitude (V): 5.54±0.01

Characteristics
- Evolutionary stage: Horizontal branch
- Spectral type: G8 III
- B−V color index: +0.9

Astrometry
Radial velocity (R_{v})	4.33±0.16 km/s
Proper motion (μ)	RA: +32.404 mas/yr Dec.: +15.893 mas/yr
Parallax (π)	11.2853±0.0516 mas
Distance	289 ± 1 ly (88.6 ± 0.4 pc)
Absolute magnitude (M_{V})	+0.88

Details
Mass	1.91 M_{☉}
Radius	8.99 R_{☉}
Luminosity	49.4±0.5 L_{☉}
Surface gravity (log g)	2.77 cgs
Temperature	5,078±5 K
Metallicity [Fe/H]	−0.12±0.01 dex
Rotational velocity (v sin i)	1.3±1.4 km/s
Age	1.31 Gyr

Other designations
- AG+75°385, BD+76°310, FK5 310, GC 11246, HD 68375, HIP 40793, HR 3216, SAO 6487

Database references
SIMBAD	data

HD 68375 (HR 3216) is a solitary star in the northern circumpolar constellation Camelopardalis. It is faintly visible to the naked eye with an apparent magnitude of 5.54 and is estimated to be 289 light years distant. However, it is receding with a heliocentric radial velocity of 4.33 km/s.

HD 68375 has a stellar classification of G8 III, indicating that it is a red giant. It is currently on the horizontal branch, generating energy via fusion inside a helium core. Specifically, it is a red clump star, at the cool end of the horizontal branch where stars with near-solar metallicity are found. After approximately 1 billion years, the star now has a radius of 9 R_{☉} and an effective temperature of 5,078 K, giving a yellow hue. Nevertheless, it has nearly double the mass of the Sun and radiates at 49 times the luminosity of the Sun from its enlarged photosphere. HD 68375 is slightly metal deficient with a metallicity 76% that of the Sun and spins with a poorly constrained projected rotational velocity of 1.3 km/s.
