= HD 34255 =

Star in the constellation of Camelopardalis

Observation data Epoch J2000.0 Equinox J2000.0 (ICRS)
- Constellation: Camelopardalis
- Right ascension: 05^{h} 20^{m} 22.61066^{s}
- Declination: +62° 39′ 13.3608″
- Apparent magnitude (V): 5.60±0.01

Characteristics
- Spectral type: K4 I
- U−B color index: +2.00
- B−V color index: +1.75

Astrometry
Radial velocity (R_{v})	−7.7±0.15 km/s
Proper motion (μ)	RA: −3.105 mas/yr Dec.: −2.373 mas/yr
Parallax (π)	1.9726±0.0788 mas
Distance	1,650 ± 70 ly (510 ± 20 pc)
Absolute bolometric magnitude (M_{bol})	−4.40±0.24

Details
Mass	6.9±0.9 M_{☉}
Radius	145 R_{☉}
Luminosity	6,101 L_{☉}
Surface gravity (log g)	1.14 cgs
Temperature	3,927±170 K
Metallicity [Fe/H]	−0.01±0.05 dex
Age	46±6 Myr

Other designations
- AG+62°410, BD+62°742, FK5 2397, GC 6496, HD 34255, HIP 24914, HR 1720, SAO 13460

Database references
SIMBAD	data

HD 34255, also known HR 1720, is a star located in the northern circumpolar constellation Camelopardalis, the giraffe. It has an apparent magnitude of 5.60, allowing it to be faintly visible to the naked eye. The object is located relatively far at a distance of about 1.65 kly but is approaching the Solar System with a heliocentric radial velocity of −7.7 km/s.

This is a solitary, evolved red supergiant with a stellar classification of K4 I. It has 6.9 times the mass of the Sun and is said to be 46 million years old. Despite the young age, it has already ceased hydrogen fusion at its core and now has an enlarged radius of 145 R_{☉}. HD 34255 radiates a bolometric luminosity over 6,000 times that of the Sun from its photosphere at an effective temperature of 3,927 K, giving it an orange glow. The star's metallicity – what astronomers dub as elements heavier than helium – is around solar level.
