= HD 32518 =

Star in the constellation of Camelopardalis

HD 32518 / Mago
- Location of HD 104985 (circled in red)

Observation data Epoch J2000.0 Equinox ICRS
- Constellation: Camelopardalis
- Right ascension: 05^{h} 09^{m} 36.720^{s}
- Declination: +69° 38′ 21.85″
- Apparent magnitude (V): 6.42±0.01

Characteristics
- Evolutionary stage: Horizontal branch
- Spectral type: K1 III
- U−B color index: +1.03
- B−V color index: +1.11

Astrometry
Radial velocity (R_{v})	−6.78±0.12 km/s
Proper motion (μ)	RA: +61.031 mas/yr Dec.: −62.382 mas/yr
Parallax (π)	8.2192±0.0166 mas
Distance	396.8 ± 0.8 ly (121.7 ± 0.2 pc)
Absolute magnitude (M_{V})	+1.04

Details
Mass	1.2±0.1 M_{☉}
Radius	10.8±0.3 R_{☉}
Luminosity	46.4±0.9 L_{☉}
Surface gravity (log g)	2.10±0.15 cgs
Temperature	4,580±70 K
Metallicity [Fe/H]	−0.15±0.04 dex
Rotational velocity (v sin i)	1.2±2 km/s
Age	6.4±1.5 Gyr

Other designations
- Mago, AG+69°241, BD+69°302, GC 6245, HD 32518, HIP 24003, HR 1636, SAO 13382

Database references
SIMBAD	data
Exoplanet Archive	data

HD 32518, also named Mago, is a star with an orbiting exoplanet in the northern circumpolar constellation Camelopardalis. It has an apparent magnitude of 6.42, placing it near the limit of naked eye visibility. Located 397 light-years away based on parallax measurements, it is receding with a heliocentric radial velocity of −6.8 km/s.

HD 32518 has a stellar classification of K1 III, indicating that it is an orange giant star that has evolved away from the main sequence. It is currently on the horizontal branch, located at the cool end in the red clump. This indicates it is generating energy by helium fusion at the core. It has 1.2 the mass of the Sun but has expanded to a radius of 10.8 R_{☉}. It shines at 46.4 times the luminosity of the Sun from its enlarged photosphere at an effective temperature of 4,731 K, giving it a yellowish orange glow. HD 32518 is likely to be somewhat older than the Sun with an age of 6.4 billion years and spins slowly with a projected rotational velocity of 1.2 km/s. Studies place its metallicity around solar level.

For the 100th anniversary of the IAU HD 32518 and the planet HD 32518b were selected NameExoWorlds campaigns for Germany. The approved name of the star HD 32518 is Mago, named after Mago National Park in Ethiopia, which is noted for its giraffes. The name was suggested by pupils of a physics course at the Max-Born-Gymnasium in Neckargemünd.

== Planetary system ==
In August 2009, a group of astrometers discovered a super-jovian exoplanet orbiting the giant star using Doppler spectroscopy. The planetary parameters were updated in 2023.

The HD 32518 planetary system
Companion (in order from star)	Mass	Semimajor axis (AU)	Orbital period (days)	Eccentricity	Inclination (°)	Radius
b (Neri)	≥2.849+0.160 −0.171 M_{J}	0.594	157.35+0.10 −0.08	0.028+0.034 −0.019	—	—

== See also ==
- List of extrasolar planets
