= HD 23005 =

Star in Camelopardlis

- Location of HD 23005 on the map (circled)

Observation data Epoch J2000.0 Equinox J2000.0 (ICRS)
- Constellation: Camelopardalis
- Right ascension: 03^{h} 46^{m} 00.94002^{s}
- Declination: +67° 12′ 05.7682″
- Apparent magnitude (V): 5.78±0.01

Characteristics
- Evolutionary stage: main sequence
- Spectral type: F1 IVnn
- U−B color index: +0.05
- B−V color index: +0.34
- Variable type: candidate γ Doradus

Astrometry
Radial velocity (R_{v})	4.9±1.5 km/s
Proper motion (μ)	RA: +82.853 mas/yr Dec.: −113.717 mas/yr
Parallax (π)	18.8168±0.0313 mas
Distance	173.3 ± 0.3 ly (53.14 ± 0.09 pc)
Absolute magnitude (M_{V})	+2.07

Details
Mass	1.69±0.07 M_{☉}
Radius	2.26±0.11 R_{☉}
Luminosity	10.93±0.04 L_{☉}
Surface gravity (log g)	3.9±0.1 cgs
Temperature	6,976±80 K
Metallicity [Fe/H]	+0.15 dex
Rotational velocity (v sin i)	66±7 km/s
Age	1.1±0.1 Gyr

Other designations
- AG+67°197, BD+66°284, FK5 2267, GC 4463, HD 23005, HIP 17585, HR 1124, SAO 12890

Database references
SIMBAD	data

HD 23005, also known as HR 1124, is a solitary, yellowish-white hued star located in the northern circumpolar constellation Camelopardalis, the giraffe. It has an apparent magnitude of 5.78, making it faintly visible to the naked eye. The object is located relatively close at a distance of 173 light years based on Gaia DR3 parallax measurements but is receding with a heliocentric radial velocity of 4.9 km/s. At its current distance, HD 23005's brightness is diminished by 0.15 magnitudes due to extinction from interstellar dust. It has an absolute magnitude of +2.07.

The star has been given several stellar classifications over the years. It has been given a luminosity class of a subgiant (IV), a blend of a subgiant and main sequence star (IV/V), and a class intermediate between a bright giant and a regular giant star (II-III). Most sources generally agree that it is an early F-type star.

HD 23005's newest spectral class is F1 IVnn, which indicates that it is an evolved F-type subgiant with very broad absorption features due to rapid rotation. It has 1.69 times the mass of the Sun and an enlarged radius of 2.26 R_{☉}. It radiates 10.9 times the luminosity of the Sun from its photosphere at an effective temperature of 6,976 K. HD 23005 has an iron abundance 141% that of the Sun's and is estimated to be 1.1 billion years old. Contrary to its suffix, the star spins modestly with a projected rotational velocity of 66 km/s. A 2016 variable star survey identified HD 23005 as a candidate γ Doradus variable.
