= HD 23277 =

Star in the constellation of Camelopardalis

Observation data Epoch J2000.0 Equinox J2000.0
- Constellation: Camelopardalis
- Right ascension: 03^{h} 49^{m} 13.7393^{s}
- Declination: +70° 52′ 15.781″
- Apparent magnitude (V): 5.391 ± 0.009

Characteristics
- Spectral type: kA2hA6VmA7
- U−B color index: +0.12
- B−V color index: +0.09

Astrometry
Radial velocity (R_{v})	17 ± 0.9 km/s
Proper motion (μ)	RA: 21.451(45) mas/yr Dec.: −62.431(55) mas/yr
Parallax (π)	8.7759±0.0632 mas
Distance	372 ± 3 ly (113.9 ± 0.8 pc)
Absolute magnitude (M_{V})	+0.27

Orbit
Primary	HD 23277 A
Companion	HD 23277 B
Period (P)	15.5132 d
Semi-major axis (a)	43.0229 AU
Eccentricity (e)	0.2210
Argument of periastron (ω) (secondary)	287.41°
Argument of periastron (ω) (primary)	107.41°
Semi-amplitude (K_{1}) (primary)	22.20 km/s
Semi-amplitude (K_{2}) (secondary)	24.69 km/s

Details

A
Mass	2.38 ± 0.13 M_{☉}
Radius	3.55+0.16 −0.24 R_{☉}
Luminosity	59.7 L_{☉}
Surface gravity (log g)	3.72 ± 0.08 cgs
Temperature	8,317+194 −189 K
Rotational velocity (v sin i)	25 ± 5 km/s
Age	610 Myr

B
Mass	2.11 M_{☉}
Rotational velocity (v sin i)	25 ± 5 km/s

Other designations
- BD+70°257, HD 23277, HIP 17854, HR 1138, SAO 5000

Database references
SIMBAD	data

HD 23277 (HR 1138) is a spectroscopic binary located in the northern circumpolar constellation Camelopardalis. With a combined apparent magnitude of 5.39, it is faintly visible to the naked eye under ideal conditions. This star is located at a distance of 372 light years, but is drifting away at a rate of 17 km/s.

The primary has a classification of kA2hA6VmA7, which indicates that it has the calcium K-line of an A2 star, but its hydrogen lines suggest a class of A6 V and metallic lines of an A7 star. At present it has 2.38 times the Sun's mass, and 3.55 times its radius. It radiates at 59.7 times the luminosity of the Sun from its photosphere at an effective temperature of 8,317 K, which gives it a white hue. The companion has 2.11 times the Sun's mass, which suggests it is an A-type main-sequence star like the primary. Both stars spin at a projected rotational velocity of 25 km/s, common for an Am star.
