= HD 30442 =

Star in the constellation Camelopardalis

Observation data Epoch J2000 Equinox J2000
- Constellation: Camelopardalis
- Right ascension: 04^{h} 52^{m} 05.2195^{s}
- Declination: +63° 30′ 19.5173″
- Apparent magnitude (V): 5.47±0.01

Characteristics
- Evolutionary stage: AGB
- Spectral type: M3 IIIab
- U−B color index: +1.76
- B−V color index: +1.55

Astrometry
Radial velocity (R_{v})	−37±0.3 km/s
Proper motion (μ)	RA: +38.424 mas/yr Dec.: −94.026 mas/yr
Parallax (π)	8.098±0.1027 mas
Distance	403 ± 5 ly (123 ± 2 pc)
Absolute magnitude (M_{V})	−0.44

Details
Mass	1.09 M_{☉}
Radius	70.85 R_{☉}
Luminosity	1,096^{+106}_{−96} L_{☉}
Surface gravity (log g)	0.92 cgs
Temperature	3,500±150 K
Metallicity [Fe/H]	0.00 dex

Other designations
- BD+63°543, FK5 2362, GC 5881, HD 30442, HIP 22626, HR 1527, SAO 13291, WDS J04521+6330A

Database references
SIMBAD	data

HD 30442 (HR 1527) is a solitary star in the northern circumpolar constellation Camelopardalis. It is faintly visible to the naked eye with an apparent magnitude of 5.47 and is estimated to be 403 light years away from the Solar System. The object has a heliocentric radial velocity of −37 km/s, indicating that it is drifting closer.

HD 30442 has a stellar classification of M3 IIIab, indicating that it is a red giant. It is an asymptotic giant branch star currently generating energy using hydrogen and helium shells around an inert carbon core. It has 109% the mass of the Sun and has an enlarged radius of 70.8 R_{☉} due to its evolved state. It radiates at almost 1,100 times the luminosity of the Sun from its photosphere at an effective temperature of 3,500 K, giving a red hue. HD 30442 is estimated to have a solar metallicity, with an abundance of iron equivalent to that of the Sun.

HD 30442 has a companion 120″ away along a position angle of 350°. It shares a common proper motion with HD 30442, suggesting physical relation, but its parallax indicates otherwise.
