= HD 20104 =

Visual binary in the constellation Camelopardalis

Observation data Epoch J2000.0 Equinox ICRS
- Constellation: Camelopardalis
- A
- Right ascension: 03^{h} 17^{m} 31.527^{s}
- Declination: +65° 39′ 30.11″
- Apparent magnitude (V): 7.05±0.01
- B
- Right ascension: 03^{h} 17^{m} 31.593^{s}
- Declination: +65° 39′ 30.26″
- Apparent magnitude (V): 7.39±0.01

Characteristics

A
- Spectral type: A2 V
- U−B color index: +0.06
- B−V color index: +0.08

B
- Spectral type: A4V

Astrometry
| Radial velocity (R_{v}) | −6±2 km/s |
| Proper motion (μ) | RA: −10.54 mas/yr Dec.: +5.84 mas/yr |
| Parallax (π) | 5.92±0.65 mas |
| Distance | approx. 550 ly (approx. 170 pc) |
| Absolute magnitude (M_{V}) | +0.3 |

Orbit
| Primary | HD 20104 A |
| Name | HD 20104 B |
| Period (P) | 350 yr |
| Semi-major axis (a) | 0.46″ |
| Eccentricity (e) | 0.4 |
| Inclination (i) | 135° |
| Longitude of the node (Ω) | 58° |
| Periastron epoch (T) | 2055.0 |
| Argument of periastron (ω) (secondary) | 100° |

Details

A
| Mass | 2.46 M_{☉} |

B
| Mass | 2.27 M_{☉} |

Other designations
- BD+65°338, GC 3893, HD 20104, HIP 15309, HR 967, SAO 12686, ADS 2436, WDS J03175+6540

Database references
| SIMBAD | The system |
- A
- B

HD 20104 (HR 967) is a visual binary in the northern circumpolar constellation Camelopardalis. The system has a combined apparent magnitude of 6.41, making it near naked eye visibility. When resolved in a large telescope, HD 20104 appears to be a pair of 7th magnitude A-type main-sequence stars with a separation of about 0.5″. Located approximately 550 light years away, the system is approaching the Sun with a heliocentric radial velocity of −6 km/s.

The system's stars have masses twice that of the Sun and effective temperatures ranging from 8,100 to 8,700 K, typical of stars their type. The primary radiates at 71.3 L_{☉} − over luminous for its class − and spins with a projected rotational velocity of 159 km/s. HD 20104 has an age of 313 million years.
