= HD 24480 =

Multiple star systemin the constellation Camelopardalis

Observation data Epoch J2000 Equinox ICRS
- Constellation: Camelopardalis
- Right ascension: 03^{h} 57^{m} 08.2886^{s}
- Declination: +61° 06′ 31.995″
- Apparent magnitude (V): 5.05

Characteristics
- Spectral type: K4III
- U−B color index: +1.18
- B−V color index: +1.42

Astrometry
Radial velocity (R_{v})	−4.20±0.20 km/s
Proper motion (μ)	RA: −2.117(96) mas/yr Dec.: −12.858(99) mas/yr
Parallax (π)	3.1699±0.1037 mas
Distance	1,030 ± 30 ly (320 ± 10 pc)

Details
Mass	1.8 M_{☉}
Radius	87 R_{☉}
Luminosity	2,170 L_{☉}
Surface gravity (log g)	1.75 cgs
Temperature	4,205 K
Metallicity [Fe/H]	−0.02 dex

Other designations
- BD+60°768, HD 24480, HIP 18488A, HR 1205, SAO 12968

Database references
SIMBAD	data

HD 24480 is a cool giant star in the northern constellation of Camelopardalis. It has a stellar classification of K4III and an apparent magnitude of 5.05.

The nearby HD 24481 is at a similar distance and shares a common proper motion. It is a hotter, A- or B-type star and a suspected spectroscopic binary system. It is 1.71 arcseconds away from HD 24480.
