= 28 Camelopardalis =

Star in the constellation Camelopardalis

Observation data Epoch J2000.0 Equinox ICRS
- Constellation: Camelopardalis
- Right ascension: 05^{h} 46^{m} 54.60612^{s}
- Declination: +56° 55′ 26.1502″
- Apparent magnitude (V): 6.79

Characteristics
- Spectral type: ApCr or A7 V
- B−V color index: 0.141±0.005

Astrometry
Radial velocity (R_{v})	+19.7±2 km/s
Proper motion (μ)	RA: +9.278 mas/yr Dec.: −25.985 mas/yr
Parallax (π)	4.6006±0.1994 mas
Distance	710 ± 30 ly (217 ± 9 pc)
Absolute magnitude (M_{V})	0.13

Details
Mass	2.0 M_{☉}
Radius	4.7 R_{☉}
Luminosity	74.04 L_{☉}
Surface gravity (log g)	3.4 cgs
Temperature	8,003 K
Rotational velocity (v sin i)	32.3±3.8 km/s

Other designations
- 28 Cam, BD+56°1059, HD 38129, HIP 27283, SAO 25364

Database references
SIMBAD	data

28 Camelopardalis is a star in the northern circumpolar constellation of Camelopardalis, located around 710 light years away from the Sun. It has an apparent visual magnitude of 6.79, which is below the normal limit for visibility to the naked eye. This star is moving further from the Earth with a heliocentric radial velocity of +20 km/s. It is a probable Ap star with a stellar classification of A7 V and an overabundance of chromium in the spectrum.
