= 22 Camelopardalis =

Star in the constellation Camelopardalis

Observation data Epoch J2000.0 Equinox ICRS
- Constellation: Camelopardalis
- Right ascension: 05^{h} 39^{m} 05.40416^{s}
- Declination: +56° 21′ 36.1540″
- Apparent magnitude (V): 7.03

Characteristics
- Spectral type: F5 V
- B−V color index: 0.411±0.004

Astrometry
Radial velocity (R_{v})	+10.3±1.8 km/s
Proper motion (μ)	RA: +10.514 mas/yr Dec.: −131.789 mas/yr
Parallax (π)	15.4048±0.1014 mas
Distance	212 ± 1 ly (64.9 ± 0.4 pc)
Absolute magnitude (M_{V})	3.14

Orbit
Period (P)	81.463±0.005 d
Eccentricity (e)	0.136±0.024
Periastron epoch (T)	51969.9±2.2 MJD
Argument of periastron (ω) (secondary)	0±10°
Semi-amplitude (K_{1}) (primary)	9.52±0.24 km/s

Details
Mass	1.34 M_{☉}
Radius	1.68 R_{☉}
Luminosity	5.215 L_{☉}
Surface gravity (log g)	4.26 cgs
Temperature	6,732±229 K
Metallicity [Fe/H]	0.01 dex
Age	1.515 Gyr

Other designations
- 22 Cam, BD+56°1044, GC 6990, HD 37070, HIP 26587, SAO 25298

Database references
SIMBAD	data

22 Camelopardalis is a binary star system in the northern circumpolar constellation of Camelopardalis, located 212 light years away from the Sun. It has an apparent visual magnitude of 7.03, which is below the normal limit for visibility with the naked eye. This object is moving further from the Earth with a mean heliocentric radial velocity of +10 km/s. Eggen (1991) listed it as a member of the IC 2391 supercluster. It has also been catalogued as a member of the Hyades group. However, Griffin (2005) suggests it belongs to neither.

This is a single-lined spectroscopic binary system with an orbital period of 81.5 days and a significant eccentricity of 0.14. It has an 'a sin i' value of 10.57 ± 0.27 Gm (0.0707 ± 0.0018 AU), where a is the semimajor axis and i is the orbital inclination to the line of sight from the Earth. This value provides a lower bound on the true semimajor axis of their orbit.

The visible component is an F-type main-sequence star with a stellar classification of F5 V. It is an estimated 1.5 billion years old with 1.3 times the mass of the Sun and 1.7 times the Sun's radius. It is radiating 5.2 times the Sun's luminosity from its photosphere at an effective temperature of 6,732 K.
