= 17 Camelopardalis =

Star in the constellation Camelopardalis

Observation data Epoch J2000 Equinox J2000
- Constellation: Camelopardalis
- Right ascension: 05^{h} 30^{m} 10.20325^{s}
- Declination: +63° 04′ 01.9891″
- Apparent magnitude (V): 5.44

Characteristics
- Evolutionary stage: AGB
- Spectral type: M1IIIa
- B−V color index: 1.704±0.004
- Variable type: suspected

Astrometry
Radial velocity (R_{v})	−20.89±0.23 km/s
Proper motion (μ)	RA: −5.602 mas/yr Dec.: −4.751 mas/yr
Parallax (π)	3.0424±0.1380 mas
Distance	1,070 ± 50 ly (330 ± 10 pc)
Absolute magnitude (M_{V})	−1.85

Details
Mass	0.64 M_{☉}
Radius	100 R_{☉}
Luminosity	3,230 L_{☉}
Surface gravity (log g)	0.15 cgs
Temperature	3,852 K

Other designations
- 17 Cam, NSV 2003, BD+62°759, FK5 203, HD 35583, HIP 25769, HR 1802, SAO 13518

Database references
SIMBAD	data

17 Camelopardalis is a single star in the northern circumpolar constellation of Camelopardalis, located roughly 960 light years away from the Sun. It is visible to the naked eye as a faint, red-hued star with an apparent visual magnitude of 5.44. This object is moving closer to the Earth with a heliocentric radial velocity of −20 km/s.

This is an ageing red giant star, currently on the asymptotic giant branch, with a stellar classification of M1IIIa. It is a suspected small amplitude variable. The star has expanded to 100 times the Sun's radius and is radiating 3,230 times the luminosity of the Sun from its enlarged photosphere at an effective temperature of 3,852 K.
