= HD 32518 b =

Extrasolar planet in the constellation Camelopardalis

HD 32518 b / Neri
Discovery
- Discovered by: Döllinger et al.
- Discovery site: TLS
- Discovery date: August 12, 2009
- Detection method: Radial velocity

Orbital characteristics
- Apastron: 0.60 AU (90,000,000 km)
- Periastron: 0.58 AU (87,000,000 km)
- Semi-major axis: 0.59 ± 0.03 AU (88,300,000 ± 4,500,000 km)
- Eccentricity: 0.01 ± 0.03
- Orbital period (sidereal): 157.54 ± 0.38 d 0.4313 ± 0.001 y
- Time of periastron: 2452950.29 ± 13.66
- Argument of periastron: 306.11 ± 126.71
- Star: HD 32518

HD 32518 b, formally named Neri, is an extrasolar planet which orbits the K-type giant star HD 32518, located 399.7 light years away in the constellation Camelopardalis. It has a minimum mass three times greater than Jupiter and orbits the intermediate-mass giant star at a distance of only 0.59 AU in a very circular orbit. The orbit takes 10.35 months to complete one round trip around the star. This planet was detected by the radial velocity method on August 12, 2009.

For the 100th anniversary of the IAU HD 32518 and the planet HD 32518b were selected NameExoWorlds campaigns for Germany. The approved name of the planet HD 32518 b is Neri, named after the river Neri in Ethiopia, which runs through parts of the Mago National park. The name was suggested by pupils of a physics course at the Max-Born-Gymnasium in Neckargemünd.
