= HD 35759 =

Star in the constellation Camelopardlis

Observation data Epoch J2000 Equinox ICRS
- Constellation: Camelopardalis
- Right ascension: 05^{h} 31^{m} 33.349^{s}
- Declination: +64° 19′ 07.59″
- Apparent magnitude (V): 7.74±0.01

Characteristics
- Evolutionary stage: subgiant
- Spectral type: G0
- B−V color index: 0.602±0.015

Astrometry
| Radial velocity (R_{v}) | −12.620±0.0025 km/s |
| Proper motion (μ) | RA: −29.318 mas/yr Dec.: −92.726 mas/yr |
| Parallax (π) | 14.0772±0.0217 mas |
| Distance | 231.7 ± 0.4 ly (71.0 ± 0.1 pc) |
| Absolute magnitude (M_{V}) | 3.45 |

Details
| Mass | 1.15±0.08 M_{☉} |
| Radius | 1.76^{+0.06}_{−0.04} R_{☉} |
| Luminosity | 3.445^{+0.015}_{−0.014} L_{☉} |
| Surface gravity (log g) | 4.0159^{+0.0740}_{−0.0818} cgs |
| Temperature | 5,927^{+67}_{−93} K |
| Metallicity [Fe/H] | 0.04±0.02 dex |
| Rotational velocity (v sin i) | 3 km/s |
| Age | 4.2 Gyr |

Other designations
- BD+64 532, HD 35759, HIP 25883, SAO 13524, WDS J05316+6419A

Database references
| SIMBAD | data |
| Exoplanet Archive | data |

HD 35759 is a star with an orbiting exoplanet located in the circumpolar constellation Camelopardalis. With an apparent magnitude of 7.74, it's impossible to see with the unaided eye, but can be seen with binoculars. The distance to this system is 232 light years based on parallax measurements, and it is drifting closer with a heliocentric radial velocity of −12.6 km/s.

This is a G-type star with 15% more mass than the Sun, but has 1.76 times the radius. It radiates at about 3 solar luminosities, and has an effective temperature of 5,927 K, which gives it a yellow hue. HD 35759 is slightly enriched in metals, with having 9.6% more iron abundance than the Sun. Like many older G-type stars, HD 35759 rotates rather slowly, with a projected rotational velocity of 3 km/s.

== Planetary System ==
In 2016, a super-jovian exoplanet was discovered orbiting the star on an eccentric orbit. Since the planet was discovered using doppler spectroscopy, its radius and true mass is unknown.

The HD 35759 planetary system
| Companion (in order from star) | Mass | Semimajor axis (AU) | Orbital period (days) | Eccentricity | Inclination (°) | Radius |
|---|---|---|---|---|---|---|
| b | ≥ 3.76±0.17 M_{J} | 0.389±0.09 | 82.467±0.019 | 0.389±0.006 | — | — |
