= 8 Camelopardalis =

Star in the constellation Camelopardalis

- Location of 8 Camelopardalis (circled)

Observation data Epoch J2000.0 Equinox ICRS
- Constellation: Camelopardalis
- Right ascension: 04^{h} 59^{m} 46.32836^{s}
- Declination: +53° 09′ 19.6253″
- Apparent magnitude (V): 6.09

Characteristics
- Evolutionary stage: giant
- Spectral type: K4 III
- B−V color index: 1.462±0.009

Astrometry
Radial velocity (R_{v})	−0.01±0.13 km/s
Proper motion (μ)	RA: −13.532 mas/yr Dec.: −10.700 mas/yr
Parallax (π)	4.3709±0.0613 mas
Distance	750 ± 10 ly (229 ± 3 pc)
Absolute magnitude (M_{V})	−0.11

Details
Mass	1.13 M_{☉}
Radius	30.19±3.31 R_{☉}
Luminosity	341±6 L_{☉}
Surface gravity (log g)	2.8 cgs
Temperature	4,257+978 −190 K
Metallicity [Fe/H]	+0.06 dex
Rotational velocity (v sin i)	1.6 km/s

Other designations
- 8 Cam, BD+52°906, HD 31579, HIP 23216, HR 1588, SAO 24943

Database references
SIMBAD	data

8 Camelopardalis is a star in the northern circumpolar constellation of Camelopardalis. It is a challenge to view with the naked eye, appearing as a dim, orange-hued star with an apparent visual magnitude of 6.09. Based upon parallax, it is located around 750 light years away from the Sun. At that distance, the visual magnitude is diminished by an extinction of 0.58 due to interstellar dust.

This is an aging K-type giant star with a stellar classification of K4 III, which indicates it has exhausted the hydrogen at its core and evolved away from the main sequence. The star has expanded to 30 times the radius of the Sun and is radiating 341 times the Sun's luminosity from its enlarged photosphere at an effective temperature of 4,257 K.
