= 40 Camelopardalis =

Star in the constellation Camelopardalis

Observation data Epoch J2000.0 Equinox ICRS
- Constellation: Camelopardalis
- Right ascension: 06^{h} 15^{m} 40.53673^{s}
- Declination: +59° 59′ 56.2729″
- Apparent magnitude (V): 5.37

Characteristics
- Spectral type: K3 III
- B−V color index: 1.339±0.006

Astrometry
Radial velocity (R_{v})	+8.56±0.29 km/s
Proper motion (μ)	RA: +26.588 mas/yr Dec.: −21.648 mas/yr
Parallax (π)	4.9142±0.1080 mas
Distance	660 ± 10 ly (203 ± 4 pc)
Absolute magnitude (M_{V})	−0.52

Details
Mass	1.6 M_{☉}
Radius	33.4 R_{☉}
Luminosity	384 L_{☉}
Surface gravity (log g)	2.10 cgs
Temperature	4,423 K
Metallicity [Fe/H]	0.00 dex
Rotational velocity (v sin i)	2.2 km/s

Other designations
- 40 Cam, BD+60°938, GC 7949, HD 42633, HIP 29730, HR 2201, SAO 13772, WDS J06157+6000A

Database references
SIMBAD	data

40 Camelopardalis is a single star in the northern circumpolar constellation of Camelopardalis, located around 600 light years distant from the Sun. It is visible to the naked eye as a faint, orange-hued star with an apparent visual magnitude of 5.37. This object is moving further from the Earth with a heliocentric radial velocity of +8.6 km/s.

This is an aging giant star with a stellar classification of K3 III, having exhausted the hydrogen at its core and evolved away from the main sequence. It has expanded to 33 times the Sun's radius and is radiating 384 times the luminosity of the Sun from its enlarged photosphere at an effective temperature of 4,188 K.

There is a magnitude 11.50 optical companion, located at an angular separation of 104.20″ along a position angle of 355° from 40 Camelopardalis, as of 2010.
