= 49 Camelopardalis =

Star in the constellation Camelopardalis

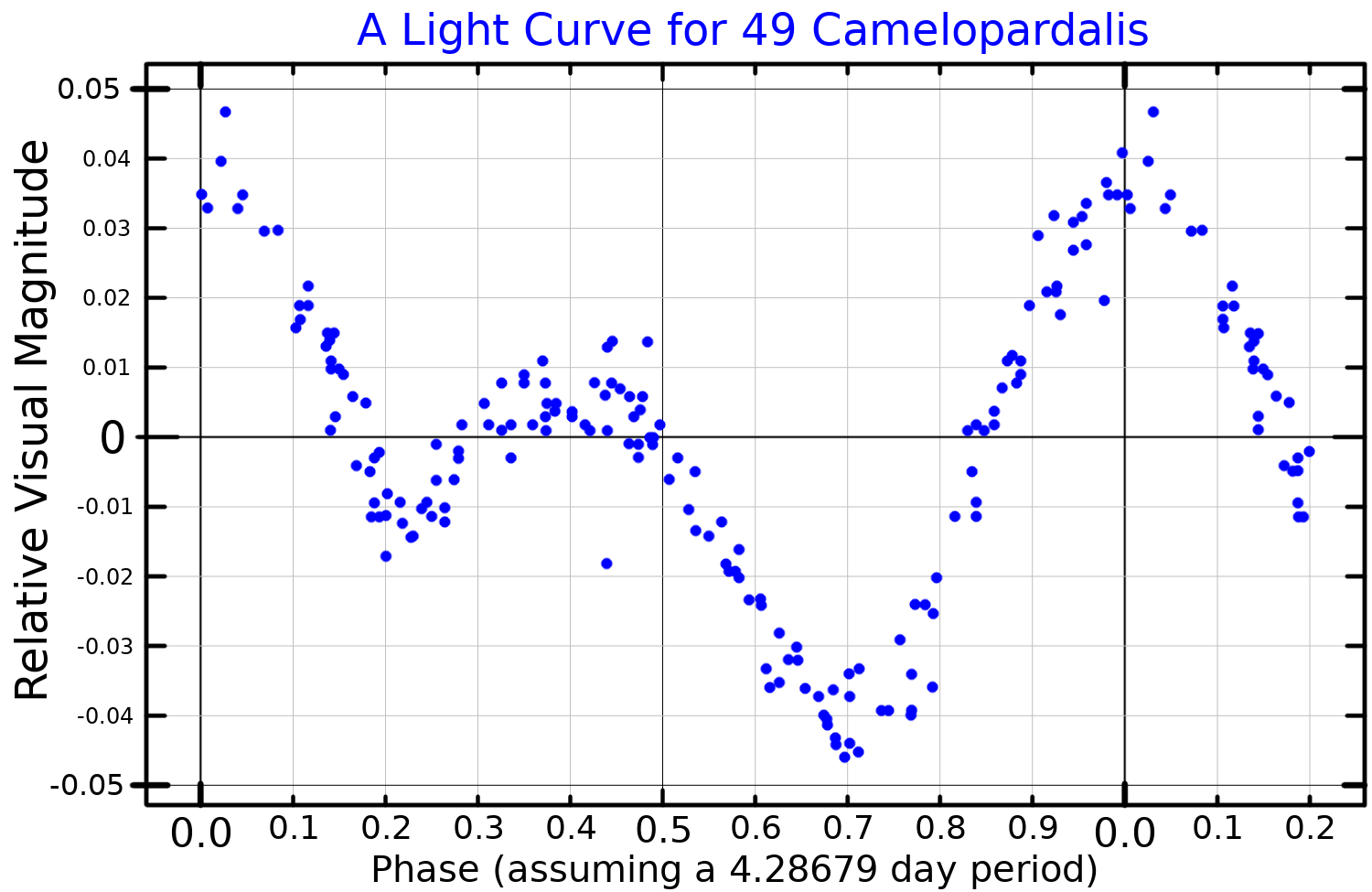
- A visual band light curve for 49 Camelopardalis, adapted from Adelman and Kaewkornmaung, (2005)>

Observation data Epoch J2000.0 Equinox ICRS
- Constellation: Camelopardalis
- Right ascension: 07^{h} 46^{m} 27.41467^{s}
- Declination: +62° 49′ 49.8829″
- Apparent magnitude (V): 6.43–6.48

Characteristics
- Evolutionary stage: main sequence
- Spectral type: A7VpSrCrEuSiKsn
- B−V color index: 0.262±0.002
- Variable type: α^{2} CVn

Astrometry
Radial velocity (R_{v})	6.5±0.5 km/s
Proper motion (μ)	RA: −36.847 mas/yr Dec.: −69.731 mas/yr
Parallax (π)	10.5523±0.0281 mas
Distance	309.1 ± 0.8 ly (94.8 ± 0.3 pc)
Absolute magnitude (M_{V})	1.58

Details
Mass	1.92+0.14 −0.25 M_{☉}
Radius	2.32±0.33 R_{☉}
Luminosity	17.4+3.5 −2.9 L_{☉}
Surface gravity (log g)	3.99±0.13 cgs
Temperature	7,740±460 K
Metallicity [Fe/H]	−3.40±0.16 dex
Rotation	4.28677±0.00003 d
Rotational velocity (v sin i)	25.8±1.0 km/s
Age	891+489 −316 Myr

Other designations
- 49 Cam, BC Cam, BD+63°733, GC 10422, HD 62140, HIP 37934, HR 2977, SAO 14322

Database references
SIMBAD	data

49 Camelopardalis is a variable star in the northern circumpolar constellation of Camelopardalis, located 309 light years from the Sun based on parallax measurements. It has the variable star designation BC Camelopardalis; 49 Camelopardalis is the Flamsteed designation. This star is a challenge to view with the naked eye, having an apparent visual magnitude of about 6.4. It is moving away from the Earth with a heliocentric radial velocity of +6.5 km/s.

This is a magnetic chemically peculiar star with a stellar classification of A7VpSrCrEuSiKsn, indicating it is an A-type main-sequence star with overabundances of various elements including strontium and europium, as well as broad, "nebulous" lines. The magnetic field of 49 Camelopardalis shows a relatively complex structure, in combination with distinct abundance patterns across the surface.

Walter K. Bonsack et al. discovered that 49 Camelopardalis is a variable star, in 1974. It is classified as an Alpha^{2} Canum Venaticorum type variable and its brightness varies from visual magnitude +6.43 down to +6.48 with a rotationally-modulated period of 4.29 days.

49 Camelopardalis has 1.9 times the mass of the Sun and 2.3 times the Sun's radius. It is around 891 million years old and is spinning with a period of 4.29 days. The star is radiating 17 times the luminosity of the Sun from its photosphere at an effective temperature of 7,740 K.
