= 24 Camelopardalis =

Star in the constellation Camelopardalis

Observation data Epoch J2000.0 Equinox ICRS
- Constellation: Camelopardalis
- Right ascension: 05^{h} 43^{m} 01.67384^{s}
- Declination: +56° 34′ 53.4884″
- Apparent magnitude (V): 6.05

Characteristics
- Spectral type: K0 III
- B−V color index: 0.951±0.001

Astrometry
Radial velocity (R_{v})	−31.34±0.16 km/s
Proper motion (μ)	RA: +15.621 mas/yr Dec.: +28.509 mas/yr
Parallax (π)	16.9727±0.0716 mas
Distance	192.2 ± 0.8 ly (58.9 ± 0.2 pc)
Absolute magnitude (M_{V})	2.19

Details
Mass	1.55±0.22 M_{☉}
Radius	5.07±0.19 R_{☉}
Luminosity	13.8+1.0 −0.9 L_{☉}
Surface gravity (log g)	3.22 cgs
Temperature	4,931 K
Metallicity [Fe/H]	0.14 dex
Rotational velocity (v sin i)	1.8 km/s
Age	2.5+0.6 −0.4 Gyr

Other designations
- 24 Cam, BD+56°1050, HD 37601, HIP 26942, HR 1941, SAO 25333

Database references
SIMBAD	data

24 Camelopardalis is a star in the northern circumpolar constellation of Camelopardalis, located 192 light years away from the Sun. It is near the lower limit of visibility to the naked eye, appearing as a dim, orange-hued star with an apparent visual magnitude of 6.05. This object is moving closer to the Earth with a heliocentric radial velocity of −31 km/s.

The stellar classification of this star is K0 III, matching an evolved giant star that has exhausted the hydrogen at its core and expanded. It is 2.5 billion years old with 1.6 times the mass of the Sun and has grown to five times the Sun's radius. The star is radiating 14 times the luminosity of the Sun from its enlarged photosphere at an effective temperature of 4,931 K.
