= HD 106112 =

Dwarf star in the constellation Camelopardalis

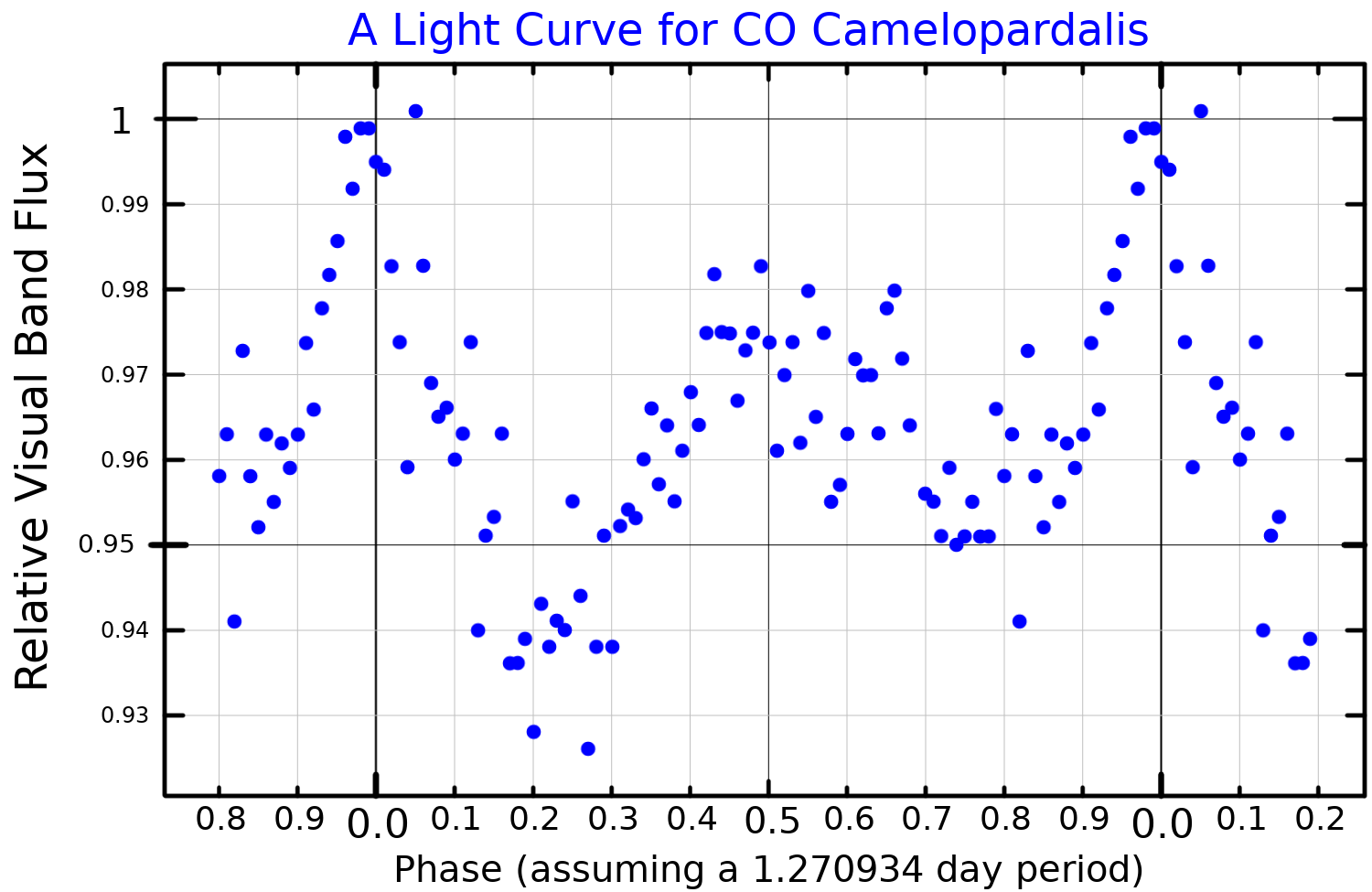
- A visual band light curve for HD 106112, adapted from Steinbring et al. (1995)

Observation data Epoch J2000 Equinox ICRS
- Constellation: Camelopardalis
- Right ascension: 12^{h} 12^{m} 11.94409^{s}
- Declination: +77° 36′ 58.4696″
- Apparent magnitude (V): 5.155

Characteristics
- Spectral type: kA6hF0mF0 (III)
- U−B color index: +0.10
- B−V color index: +0.31
- Variable type: Ellipsoidal

Astrometry
Radial velocity (R_{v})	0.40 km/s
Proper motion (μ)	RA: 11.40 mas/yr Dec.: 20.20 mas/yr
Parallax (π)	29.96±0.24 mas
Distance	108.9 ± 0.9 ly (33.4 ± 0.3 pc)
Absolute magnitude (M_{V})	1.62

Orbit
Period (P)	1.271 days
Eccentricity (e)	0.01
Periastron epoch (T)	2436763.91
Argument of periastron (ω) (secondary)	163°
Semi-amplitude (K_{1}) (primary)	64.00 km/s

Details

A
Luminosity	8.02 L_{☉}
Surface gravity (log g)	3.98 cgs
Temperature	7,122 K
Rotational velocity (v sin i)	64.1 km/s

Other designations
- CO Cam, BD+78°412, HD 106112, HIP 59504, SAO 7522, HR 4646, GC 16672

Database references
SIMBAD	data

HD 106112, also known as CO Camelopardalis, is a star in the constellation Camelopardalis. It has an apparent magnitude of about 5.1, meaning that it is just barely visible to the naked eye. Based upon parallax measurements made by the Hipparcos spacecraft, this star is around 177 light years away from the Sun.

HD 106112's spectral type shows that it is an A-type giant star. HD 106112 is also an Am star, also known as a metallic-line star. These types of stars have spectra indicating varying amounts of metals, like iron.

Observations of the stars spectrum reveal a periodic Doppler shift. This means that HD 106112 is a spectroscopic binary with a period of 1.271 days and an eccentricity of 0.01. Eric Steinbring et al. discovered that the star is a variable star, in 1995. It was given its variable star designation, CO Camelopardalis, in 1997. The two stars orbit so closely that they distort each other into an ellipsoidal shape through gravity, thereby forming a rotating ellipsoidal variable system. However, almost no information is known about the companion star.
