= Astronomische Gesellschaft Katalog =

Northern-hemisphere star catalogue

The Astronomische Gesellschaft Katalog (AGK) is an astrometric star catalogue of the Northern hemisphere. It was published in 3 versions from 1890 until 1975, named AGK1, AGK2 and AGK3.

== History ==
Compilation for the first version, Astronomische Gesellschaft Katalog 1 AGK1, was started in 1867, directed by Friedrich Argelander and published between 1890 (three sections from the observatories at Oslo, Helsinki, and Neuchâtel Observatory) and 1924 (final section: Algiers Observatory), listing 200 000 stars down to ninth magnitude.

The second version, AGK2, was started in the 1920s, and published between 1951 and 1958 using photographic data obtained from the Bonn and Hamburg Observatories. Karl Friedrich Küstner was involved in the planning for star catalog AGK2 with the Bonn part then directed by Ernst Arnold Kohlschütter.

The third version, AGK3, was started in 1956 and published in 1975. It contains 183,145 stars north of declination –2° with mean positional errors of ±0.13" and mean proper motion errors of ±0.009"/year.

== See also ==
- Hoher List Observatory
