= Camelopardalis in Chinese astronomy =

According to traditional Chinese uranography, the modern constellation Camelopardalis is located in Three Enclosures (三垣, Sān Yuán).

The name of the western constellation in modern Chinese is 鹿豹座 (lù bào zuò), meaning "the leopard-deer constellation".

== Stars ==
The map of Chinese constellations in the region of Camelopardalis consists of :

Enclosures	Enclosure (Chinese name)	Romanization	Translation	Asterisms (Chinese name)	Romanization	Translation	Western star name	Proper Name	Chinese star name	Romanization	Translation
Three Enclosures (三垣)	紫微垣	Zǐ Wēi Yuán	Purple Forbidden enclosure	北極	Běijí	Northern Pole					
Three Enclosures (三垣)	紫微垣	Zǐ Wēi Yuán	Purple Forbidden enclosure	北極	Běijí	Northern Pole	Σ 1694				
Three Enclosures (三垣)	紫微垣	Zǐ Wēi Yuán	Purple Forbidden enclosure	北極	Běijí	Northern Pole	Σ 1694		北極五	Běijíwu	5th star
Three Enclosures (三垣)	紫微垣	Zǐ Wēi Yuán	Purple Forbidden enclosure	北極	Běijí	Northern Pole	Σ 1694		天樞	Tiānshū	The Celestial Pivot
Three Enclosures (三垣)	紫微垣	Zǐ Wēi Yuán	Purple Forbidden enclosure	北極	Běijí	Northern Pole	Σ 1694		古北极天枢	Gǔběijítiānshū	Ancient Celestial Pivot in the North Pole
Three Enclosures (三垣)	紫微垣	Zǐ Wēi Yuán	Purple Forbidden enclosure	北極	Běijí	Northern Pole	Σ 1694		古北极纽星	Gǔběijíniǔxīng	Ancient star in the Celestial Pivot
Three Enclosures (三垣)	紫微垣	Zǐ Wēi Yuán	Purple Forbidden enclosure	北極	Běijí	Northern Pole	Σ 1694		古北极星	Gǔběijíxīng	Ancient star of Celestial Pivot
Three Enclosures (三垣)	紫微垣	Zǐ Wēi Yuán	Purple Forbidden enclosure	四輔	Sìfǔ	Four Advisors					
Three Enclosures (三垣)	紫微垣	Zǐ Wēi Yuán	Purple Forbidden enclosure	四輔	Sìfǔ	Four Advisors	HD 89571		四輔二	Sìfǔèr	2nd star
Three Enclosures (三垣)	紫微垣	Zǐ Wēi Yuán	Purple Forbidden enclosure	四輔	Sìfǔ	Four Advisors	HD 90089		四輔三	Sìfǔsān	3rd star
Three Enclosures (三垣)	紫微垣	Zǐ Wēi Yuán	Purple Forbidden enclosure	紫微右垣	Zǐwēiyòuyuán	Right Wall					
Three Enclosures (三垣)	紫微垣	Zǐ Wēi Yuán	Purple Forbidden enclosure	紫微右垣	Zǐwēiyòuyuán	Right Wall	43 Cam				
Three Enclosures (三垣)	紫微垣	Zǐ Wēi Yuán	Purple Forbidden enclosure	紫微右垣	Zǐwēiyòuyuán	Right Wall	43 Cam		紫微右垣五	Zǐwēiyòuyuánwu	5th star
Three Enclosures (三垣)	紫微垣	Zǐ Wēi Yuán	Purple Forbidden enclosure	紫微右垣	Zǐwēiyòuyuán	Right Wall	43 Cam		上衛	Shǎngwèi	The First Imperial Guard
Three Enclosures (三垣)	紫微垣	Zǐ Wēi Yuán	Purple Forbidden enclosure	紫微右垣	Zǐwēiyòuyuán	Right Wall	43 Cam		西上衛	Xīshǎngwèi	The First Imperial Guard in the west
Three Enclosures (三垣)	紫微垣	Zǐ Wēi Yuán	Purple Forbidden enclosure	紫微右垣	Zǐwēiyòuyuán	Right Wall	36 Cam		上衛增一	Shǎngwèizēngyī	1st additional star of The First Imperial Guard
Three Enclosures (三垣)	紫微垣	Zǐ Wēi Yuán	Purple Forbidden enclosure	紫微右垣	Zǐwēiyòuyuán	Right Wall	L Cam		上衛增二	Shǎngwèizēngèr	2nd additional star of The First Imperial Guard
Three Enclosures (三垣)	紫微垣	Zǐ Wēi Yuán	Purple Forbidden enclosure	紫微右垣	Zǐwēiyòuyuán	Right Wall	42 Cam		上衛增三	Shǎngwèizēngsān	3rd additional star of The First Imperial Guard
Three Enclosures (三垣)	紫微垣	Zǐ Wēi Yuán	Purple Forbidden enclosure	紫微右垣	Zǐwēiyòuyuán	Right Wall	α Cam				
Three Enclosures (三垣)	紫微垣	Zǐ Wēi Yuán	Purple Forbidden enclosure	紫微右垣	Zǐwēiyòuyuán	Right Wall	α Cam		紫微右垣六	Zǐwēiyòuyuánliù	6th star
Three Enclosures (三垣)	紫微垣	Zǐ Wēi Yuán	Purple Forbidden enclosure	紫微右垣	Zǐwēiyòuyuán	Right Wall	α Cam		少衛	Shǎowèi	The Second Imperial Guard
Three Enclosures (三垣)	紫微垣	Zǐ Wēi Yuán	Purple Forbidden enclosure	紫微右垣	Zǐwēiyòuyuán	Right Wall	α Cam		西少衛	Xīshǎowèi	The Second Imperial Guard in the west
Three Enclosures (三垣)	紫微垣	Zǐ Wēi Yuán	Purple Forbidden enclosure	紫微右垣	Zǐwēiyòuyuán	Right Wall	HD 27022		少衛增一	Shǎowèizēngyī	1st additional star of The Second Imperial Guard
Three Enclosures (三垣)	紫微垣	Zǐ Wēi Yuán	Purple Forbidden enclosure	紫微右垣	Zǐwēiyòuyuán	Right Wall	BK Cam				
Three Enclosures (三垣)	紫微垣	Zǐ Wēi Yuán	Purple Forbidden enclosure	紫微右垣	Zǐwēiyòuyuán	Right Wall	BK Cam		紫微右垣七	Zǐwēiyòuyuánqī	7th star
Three Enclosures (三垣)	紫微垣	Zǐ Wēi Yuán	Purple Forbidden enclosure	紫微右垣	Zǐwēiyòuyuán	Right Wall	BK Cam		上丞	Shǎngchéng	The First Prime Minister
Three Enclosures (三垣)	紫微垣	Zǐ Wēi Yuán	Purple Forbidden enclosure	紫微右垣	Zǐwēiyòuyuán	Right Wall	BE Cam	Custos	上丞增一	Shǎngchéngzēngyī	1st additional star of The First Prime Minister
Three Enclosures (三垣)	紫微垣	Zǐ Wēi Yuán	Purple Forbidden enclosure	紫微右垣	Zǐwēiyòuyuán	Right Wall	HD 23089		上丞增二	Shǎngchéngzēngèr	2nd additional star of The First Prime Minister
Three Enclosures (三垣)	紫微垣	Zǐ Wēi Yuán	Purple Forbidden enclosure	紫微右垣	Zǐwēiyòuyuán	Right Wall	H Cam		上丞增三	Shǎngchéngzēngsān	3rd additional star of The First Prime Minister
Three Enclosures (三垣)	紫微垣	Zǐ Wēi Yuán	Purple Forbidden enclosure	大理	Dàlǐ	Chief Judge	CO Cam		大理一	Dàlǐyī	1st star
Three Enclosures (三垣)	紫微垣	Zǐ Wēi Yuán	Purple Forbidden enclosure	六甲	Liùjiá	Six Jia					
Three Enclosures (三垣)	紫微垣	Zǐ Wēi Yuán	Purple Forbidden enclosure	六甲	Liùjiá	Six Jia	HD 46588		六甲一	Liùjiáyī	1st star
Three Enclosures (三垣)	紫微垣	Zǐ Wēi Yuán	Purple Forbidden enclosure	六甲	Liùjiá	Six Jia	HD 49878		六甲二	Liùjiáèr	2nd star
Three Enclosures (三垣)	紫微垣	Zǐ Wēi Yuán	Purple Forbidden enclosure	六甲	Liùjiá	Six Jia	HD 64486		六甲三	Liùjiásān	3rd star
Three Enclosures (三垣)	紫微垣	Zǐ Wēi Yuán	Purple Forbidden enclosure	六甲	Liùjiá	Six Jia	VZ Cam		六甲四	Liùjiásì	4th star
Three Enclosures (三垣)	紫微垣	Zǐ Wēi Yuán	Purple Forbidden enclosure	六甲	Liùjiá	Six Jia	K Cam		六甲六	Liùjiáliù	6th star
Three Enclosures (三垣)	紫微垣	Zǐ Wēi Yuán	Purple Forbidden enclosure	六甲	Liùjiá	Six Jia	BN Cam		六甲增一	Liùjiázēngyī	1st additional star
Three Enclosures (三垣)	紫微垣	Zǐ Wēi Yuán	Purple Forbidden enclosure	杠	Gāng	Canopy Support	γ Cam	Shaowei	杠一	Gāngyī	1st star
Three Enclosures (三垣)	紫微垣	Zǐ Wēi Yuán	Purple Forbidden enclosure	傳舍	Chuánshě	Guest House					
Three Enclosures (三垣)	紫微垣	Zǐ Wēi Yuán	Purple Forbidden enclosure	傳舍	Chuánshě	Guest House	CS Cam		傳舍七	Chuánshěqī	7th star
Three Enclosures (三垣)	紫微垣	Zǐ Wēi Yuán	Purple Forbidden enclosure	傳舍	Chuánshě	Guest House	CE Cam		傳舍八	Chuánshěbā	8th star
Three Enclosures (三垣)	紫微垣	Zǐ Wēi Yuán	Purple Forbidden enclosure	傳舍	Chuánshě	Guest House	D Cam		傳舍九	Chuánshějiǔ	9th star
Three Enclosures (三垣)	紫微垣	Zǐ Wēi Yuán	Purple Forbidden enclosure	傳舍	Chuánshě	Guest House	HD 24480		傳舍增二	Chuánshězēngèr	2nd additional star
Three Enclosures (三垣)	紫微垣	Zǐ Wēi Yuán	Purple Forbidden enclosure	傳舍	Chuánshě	Guest House	HD 26670		傳舍增三	Chuánshězēngsān	3rd additional star
Three Enclosures (三垣)	紫微垣	Zǐ Wēi Yuán	Purple Forbidden enclosure	傳舍	Chuánshě	Guest House	HD 25291		傳舍增四	Chuánshězēngsì	4th additional star
Three Enclosures (三垣)	紫微垣	Zǐ Wēi Yuán	Purple Forbidden enclosure	八穀	Bāgǔ	Eight Kinds of Crops					
Three Enclosures (三垣)	紫微垣	Zǐ Wēi Yuán	Purple Forbidden enclosure	八穀	Bāgǔ	Eight Kinds of Crops	26 Cam		八穀三	Bāgǔsān	3rd star
Three Enclosures (三垣)	紫微垣	Zǐ Wēi Yuán	Purple Forbidden enclosure	八穀	Bāgǔ	Eight Kinds of Crops	14 Cam		八穀四	Bāgǔsì	4th star
Three Enclosures (三垣)	紫微垣	Zǐ Wēi Yuán	Purple Forbidden enclosure	八穀	Bāgǔ	Eight Kinds of Crops	7 Cam		八穀五	Bāgǔwu	5th star
Three Enclosures (三垣)	紫微垣	Zǐ Wēi Yuán	Purple Forbidden enclosure	八穀	Bāgǔ	Eight Kinds of Crops	11 Cam		八穀七	Bāgǔqī	7th star
Three Enclosures (三垣)	紫微垣	Zǐ Wēi Yuán	Purple Forbidden enclosure	八穀	Bāgǔ	Eight Kinds of Crops	31 Cam		八穀八	Bāgǔbā	8th star
Three Enclosures (三垣)	紫微垣	Zǐ Wēi Yuán	Purple Forbidden enclosure	八穀	Bāgǔ	Eight Kinds of Crops	4 Cam		八谷增一	Bāgǔzēngyī	1st additional star
Three Enclosures (三垣)	紫微垣	Zǐ Wēi Yuán	Purple Forbidden enclosure	八穀	Bāgǔ	Eight Kinds of Crops	6 Cam		八穀增二	Bāgǔzēngèr	2nd additional star
Three Enclosures (三垣)	紫微垣	Zǐ Wēi Yuán	Purple Forbidden enclosure	八穀	Bāgǔ	Eight Kinds of Crops	5 Cam		八穀增三	Bāgǔzēngsān	3rd additional star
Three Enclosures (三垣)	紫微垣	Zǐ Wēi Yuán	Purple Forbidden enclosure	八穀	Bāgǔ	Eight Kinds of Crops	29 Cam		八穀增七	Bāgǔzēngqī	7th additional star
Three Enclosures (三垣)	紫微垣	Zǐ Wēi Yuán	Purple Forbidden enclosure	八穀	Bāgǔ	Eight Kinds of Crops	28 Cam		八穀增八	Bāgǔzēngbā	8th additional star
Three Enclosures (三垣)	紫微垣	Zǐ Wēi Yuán	Purple Forbidden enclosure	八穀	Bāgǔ	Eight Kinds of Crops	24 Cam		八谷增九	Bāgǔzēngjiǔ	9th additional star
Three Enclosures (三垣)	紫微垣	Zǐ Wēi Yuán	Purple Forbidden enclosure	八穀	Bāgǔ	Eight Kinds of Crops	18 Cam		八穀增十	Bāgǔzēngshí	10th additional star
Three Enclosures (三垣)	紫微垣	Zǐ Wēi Yuán	Purple Forbidden enclosure	八穀	Bāgǔ	Eight Kinds of Crops	16 Cam		八穀增十一	Bāgǔzēngshíyī	11th additional star
Three Enclosures (三垣)	紫微垣	Zǐ Wēi Yuán	Purple Forbidden enclosure	八穀	Bāgǔ	Eight Kinds of Crops	15 Cam		八穀增十二	Bāgǔzēngshíèr	12th additional star
Three Enclosures (三垣)	紫微垣	Zǐ Wēi Yuán	Purple Forbidden enclosure	八穀	Bāgǔ	Eight Kinds of Crops	12 Cam		八穀增十三	Bāgǔzēngshísān	13th additional star
Three Enclosures (三垣)	紫微垣	Zǐ Wēi Yuán	Purple Forbidden enclosure	八穀	Bāgǔ	Eight Kinds of Crops	β Cam		八谷增十四	Bāgǔzēngzēngsì	14th additional star
Three Enclosures (三垣)	紫微垣	Zǐ Wēi Yuán	Purple Forbidden enclosure	八穀	Bāgǔ	Eight Kinds of Crops	19 Cam		八穀增十五	Bāgǔzēngshíwǔ	15th additional star
Three Enclosures (三垣)	紫微垣	Zǐ Wēi Yuán	Purple Forbidden enclosure	八穀	Bāgǔ	Eight Kinds of Crops	21 Cam		八穀增十六	Bāgǔzēngshíliù	16th additional star
Three Enclosures (三垣)	紫微垣	Zǐ Wēi Yuán	Purple Forbidden enclosure	八穀	Bāgǔ	Eight Kinds of Crops	23 Cam		八穀增十七	Bāgǔzēngshíqī	17th additional star
Three Enclosures (三垣)	紫微垣	Zǐ Wēi Yuán	Purple Forbidden enclosure	八穀	Bāgǔ	Eight Kinds of Crops	30 Cam		八穀增十八	Bāgǔzēngshíbā	18th additional star
Three Enclosures (三垣)	紫微垣	Zǐ Wēi Yuán	Purple Forbidden enclosure	八穀	Bāgǔ	Eight Kinds of Crops	37 Cam		八穀增十九	Bāgǔzēngshíjiǔ	19th additional star
Three Enclosures (三垣)	紫微垣	Zǐ Wēi Yuán	Purple Forbidden enclosure	八穀	Bāgǔ	Eight Kinds of Crops	30 Cam		八穀增二十	Bāgǔzēngèrshí	20th additional star
White Tiger of the West (西方白虎)	胃	Wèi	Stomach	天船	Tiānchuán	Celestial Boat					
White Tiger of the West (西方白虎)	胃	Wèi	Stomach	天船	Tiānchuán	Celestial Boat	HD 26764		天船九	Tiānchuánjiǔ	9th star
White Tiger of the West (西方白虎)	胃	Wèi	Stomach	天船	Tiānchuán	Celestial Boat	3 Cam		天船增七	Tiānchuánzēngqī	7th additional star
White Tiger of the West (西方白虎)	胃	Wèi	Stomach	天船	Tiānchuán	Celestial Boat	2 Cam		天船增八	Tiānchuánzēngbā	8th additional star
White Tiger of the West (西方白虎)	胃	Wèi	Stomach	天船	Tiānchuán	Celestial Boat	1 Cam		天船增九	Tiānchuánzēngjiǔ	9th additional star

== See also ==
- Traditional Chinese star names
- Chinese constellations
