= Delta Aurigae =

Star in the constellation Auriga

- Location of δ Aurigae (circled)

Observation data Epoch J2000 Equinox ICRS
- Constellation: Auriga
- Right ascension: 05^{h} 59^{m} 31.61842^{s}
- Declination: +54° 17′ 05.0567″
- Apparent magnitude (V): 3.715

Characteristics
- Evolutionary stage: red clump
- Spectral type: K0 IIIb
- U−B color index: +0.837
- B−V color index: +1.017
- R−I color index: 0.5

Astrometry
Radial velocity (R_{v})	+9.75±0.44 km/s
Proper motion (μ)	RA: +85.814 mas/yr Dec.: −142.928 mas/yr
Parallax (π)	23.0557±0.4512 mas
Distance	141 ± 3 ly (43.4 ± 0.8 pc)
Absolute magnitude (M_{V})	0.56

Orbit
Period (P)	1,283.4±0.7 d
Semi-major axis (a)	≥ 39.1 ± 0.8 Gm (0.2614 ± 0.0053 AU)
Eccentricity (e)	0.231±0.017
Periastron epoch (T)	52,980±16 MJD
Argument of periastron (ω) (secondary)	200±5°
Semi-amplitude (K_{1}) (primary)	2.28±0.04 km/s

Details
Mass	1.63 M_{☉}
Radius	11 R_{☉}
Luminosity	62 L_{☉}
Surface gravity (log g)	2.7 cgs
Temperature	4,786 K
Metallicity [Fe/H]	−0.15 dex
Rotational velocity (v sin i)	3.9 km/s
Age	3.26 Gyr

Other designations
- Bagu, Prajapati, δ Aur, 33 Aurigae, BD+54 970, FK5 225, GC 7521, HD 40035, HIP 28358, HR 2077, SAO 25502, PPM 30177, WDS J05595+5417A

Database references
SIMBAD	data

Delta Aurigae, also named Bagu, is an astrometric binary star in the northern constellation of Auriga. This star is visible to the naked eye with an apparent visual magnitude of 3.715. Based upon its annual parallax shift of 23.06 mas, it is some 141 light-years (43 parsecs) distant from the Earth, give or take a three light-year margin of error. It is drifting further away with a radial velocity of +10 km/s. This star is the namesake for the Delta Aurigids, a meteor shower that occurs between October 6–15. The radiant point for this shower passes several degrees to the south of the star.

The variable radial velocity of this system was not recognized until 1999, more than a century following the first measurement in 1897. Delta Aurigae is a single-lined spectroscopic binary: periodic Doppler shifts in the star's spectrum indicate orbital motion. The pair have an orbital period of 1,283.4 days (3.514 years) and an eccentricity of 0.231. Based on the small amplitude of the radial velocity variation, the companion is most likely a small K- or early M-type main-sequence star with around half the mass of the Sun.

The visible component of this system is an evolved giant star with a stellar classification of K0 IIIb. It is a red clump star, indicating that it is generating energy through helium fusion at its core. This star is 3.26 billion years old and is spinning with a projected rotational velocity of 4 km/s. It has 1.63 times the mass of the Sun and has expanded to 11 times the Sun's radius. The star is radiating 62 times the Sun's luminosity from the star's photosphere at an effective temperature of 4,786 K. This heat gives the star the orange-hued glow of a K-type star.

== Naming ==
Delta Aurigae is a Bayer designation that is Latinized from δ Aurigae, and abbreviated Delta Aur or δ Aur.

In Indian astronomy, it is known by the name Prajapati /prəˈdʒɑːpəti/, from the Sanskrit प्रजापति prajāpati "the Lord of Created Beings".

In Chinese astronomy, 八穀 (Bā Gǔ), meaning Eight Kinds of Crops, refers to an asterism consisting of δ Aurigae, ξ Aurigae, 26 Camelopardalis, 14 Camelopardalis, 7 Camelopardalis, 9 Aurigae, 11 Camelopardalis and 31 Camelopardalis. Consequently, the Chinese name for δ Aurigae itself is 八穀一 (Bā Gǔ yī, English: the First Star of Eight Kinds of Crops), representing rice. The IAU Working Group on Star Names approved the name Bagu for Delta Aurigae A on 13 November 2025, after the Chinese constellation, and it is now so entered in the IAU Catalog of Star Names.
