= Four Advisors =

The Four Advisors (Chinese: 四辅; pinyin: sì fǔ) is a traditional Chinese asterism found in the Purple Forbidden enclosure (Chinese: 紫微垣; pinyin: zǐ wēi yuán). It consists of four stars found in the modern constellations of Ursa Minor and Camelopardalis and represents the four assistants of ancient emperors. During the Qing dynasty, a star from the constellation Draco was added to the asterism.

Order	Corresponding star
1 (四辅一)	unclear, in Ursa Minor
2 (四辅二)	HD 89571 (in Camelopardalis) (Note: Stellarium, citing Yi Shitong, 1981)
3 (四辅三)	HD 90089 (in Camelopardalis)
4 (四辅四)	unclear, in Camelopardalis
+1 (四辅增一)	HD 81817 (in Draco)
