= Tongling (disambiguation) =

Tongling is a city in Anhui province, China.

Tongling may also refer to:

- Yi'an District, formerly Tongling County, a region of China
- Tong Ling, Chinese table tennis player
- Tonglingxing (HD 49878), a star
- 12418 Tongling, an asteroid
- Chinese frigate Tongling (542), the former name of a ship

== See also ==
- Tongling Nonferrous Metals
- Tongling Yangtze River Bridge
