= 3 Camelopardalis =

Star in the constellation Camelopardalis

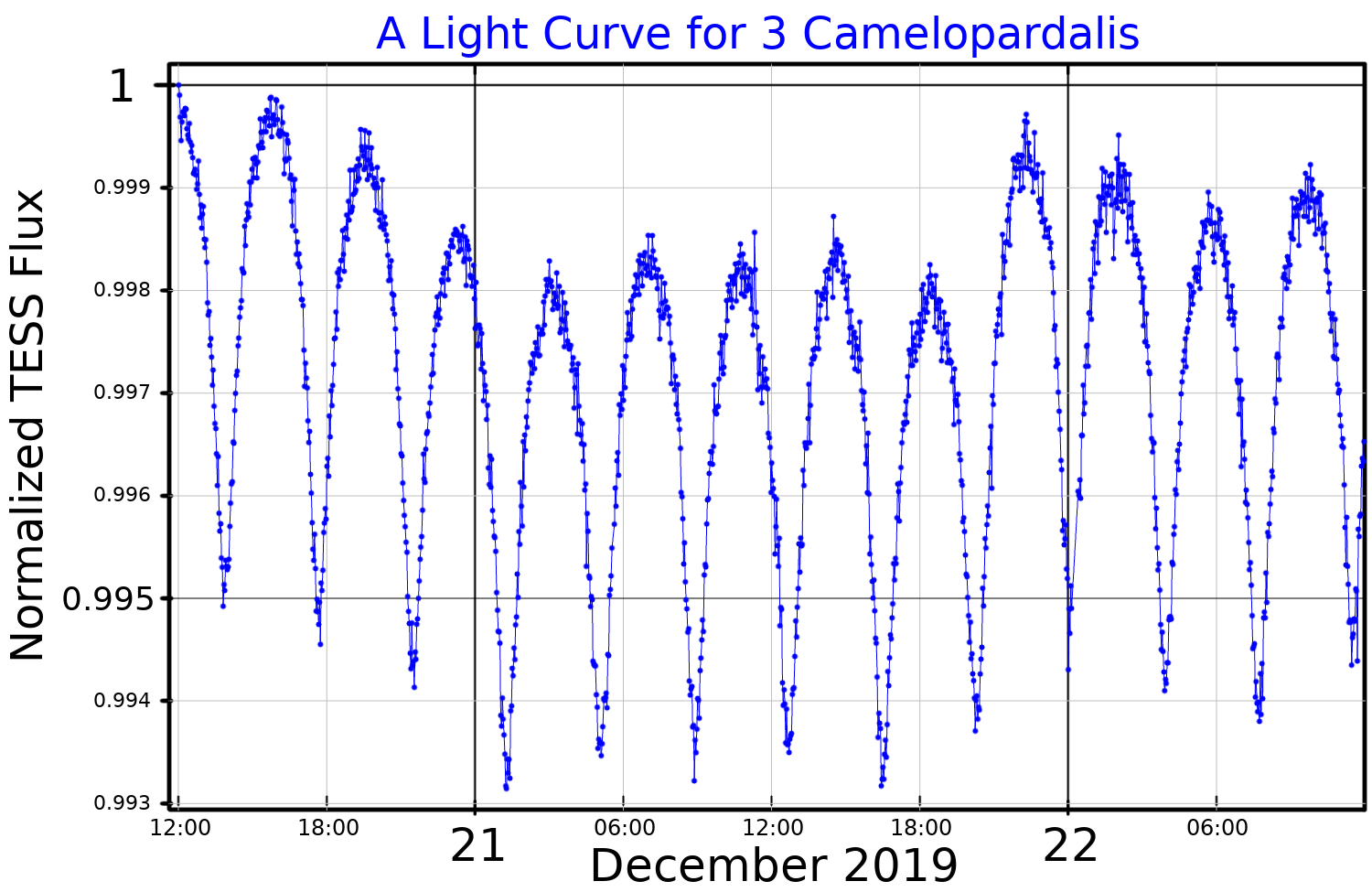
- A light curve for 3 Camelopardalis, plotted from TESS data

Observation data Epoch J2000 Equinox ICRS
- Constellation: Camelopardalis
- Right ascension: 04^{h} 39^{m} 54.682^{s}
- Declination: +53° 04′ 46.33″
- Apparent magnitude (V): 5.073

Characteristics
- Spectral type: K0III
- U−B color index: 0.89
- B−V color index: 1.07
- Variable type: suspected RS CVn

Astrometry
| Radial velocity (R_{v}) | −40.50 km/s |
| Proper motion (μ) | RA: −5.68±0.66 mas/yr Dec.: −15.00±0.60 mas/yr |
| Parallax (π) | 7.72±0.70 mas |
| Distance | 420 ± 40 ly (130 ± 10 pc) |
| Absolute magnitude (M_{V}) | −0.82 |

Orbit
| Primary | Aa |
| Name | Ab |
| Period (P) | 121 days |
| Eccentricity (e) | 0.02 |
| Semi-amplitude (K_{1}) (primary) | 28.20 km/s |

Details

Aa
| Mass | 3.3 M_{☉} |
| Radius | 24.1 R_{☉} |
| Luminosity | 259 L_{☉} |
| Surface gravity (log g) | 2.49 cgs |
| Temperature | 4,715 K |
| Metallicity | −0.21 |
| Rotation | 121 days |
| Rotational velocity (v sin i) | 6.7 km/s |

Ab
| Mass | 2.37 M_{☉} |

B
| Mass | 0.65 M_{☉} |

Other designations
- HR 1467, HD 29317, BD+52°865, HIP 21727, SAO 24743, GC 5658, ADS 3359, CCDM 04399+5305

Database references
| SIMBAD | data |

Data sources:

Hipparcos Catalogue, CCDM (2002), Bright Star Catalogue (5th rev. ed.)

3 Camelopardalis is a spectroscopic and visual binary in the constellation Camelopardalis. It is approximately 496 light years from Earth.

3 Camelopardalis is a visual binary with the two components separated by 3.7". The brighter of the pair is also a single-lined spectroscopic binary with an orbital period of 121 days.

The primary component, 3 Camelopardalis Aa, is an orange K-type giant with a mean apparent magnitude of +5.07. It rotates once every 121 days, matching the orbital period with its close companion. It was thought to be a short period Cepheid variable when it was first investigated, but has since been classified as a probable RS Canum Venaticorum variable. The total amplitude of its variations is less than 0.1 magnitudes.

The spectroscopic companion has not been observed directly and its cannot be detected in the spectrum. It is inferred on the basis of radial velocity variations in its brighter companion. Assuming a circular orbit, it has a mass of 2.37 M_{☉}.

The visual companion is a 12th magnitude star.
