= HD 49878 =

Star in the constellation Camelopardalis

- Location of HD 49878 (circled in red)

Observation data Epoch J2000 Equinox ICRS
- Constellation: Camelopardalis
- Right ascension: 07^{h} 00^{m} 04.0372^{s}
- Declination: +76° 58′ 38.671″
- Apparent magnitude (V): +4.551

Characteristics
- Evolutionary stage: red giant branch
- Spectral type: K4 III
- B−V color index: 1.399

Astrometry
Radial velocity (R_{v})	−29.47±0.19 km/s
Proper motion (μ)	RA: 72.948(83) mas/yr Dec.: −13.442(109) mas/yr
Parallax (π)	17.0753±0.1093 mas
Distance	191 ± 1 ly (58.6 ± 0.4 pc)
Absolute magnitude (M_{V})	0.80

Details
Mass	1.239±0.217 M_{☉}
Radius	18.68+0.34 −0.79 R_{☉}
Luminosity	94.2±1.5 L_{☉}
Surface gravity (log g)	2.11 cgs
Temperature	4,160+91 −38 K
Metallicity [Fe/H]	0.05 dex
Rotational velocity (v sin i)	1.4 km/s
Age	4.817±2.347 Gyr

Other designations
- Tonglingxing, BD+77°266, FK5 260, GC 9073, HD 49878, HIP 33694, HR 2527, SAO 6022

Database references
SIMBAD	data

HD 49878, also named Tonglingxing, is a single star in the northern circumpolar constellation of Camelopardalis. It has an orange hue and is faintly visible to the naked eye with an apparent visual magnitude of +4.55. The star is located at a distance of approximately 191 light years from the Sun, as determined from its parallax. It is drifting closer with a radial velocity of −29.5 km/s. The star has been listed as a candidate member of the Wolf 630 moving group, but is most likely a field star.

This is an aging giant star with a stellar classification of K4 III, having exhausted the supply of hydrogen at its core and expanded to 19 times the Sun's radius. It is roughly 5 billion years old with 1.24 times the mass of the Sun. The star is radiating 94 times the luminosity of the Sun from its enlarged photosphere at an effective temperature of 4,160 K. It is spinning slowly with a projected rotational velocity of 1.4 km/s.

In Chinese astronomy, Tongling (桐陵, "Phoenix Tree Mound") is a very old star name in the Purple Forbidden Enclosure that was identified with HD 49878. It was later named Shaowei and identified with other stars, such as Alpha or Gamma Camelopardalis. The IAU Working Group on Star Names approved the name Tonglingxing for HD 49878 on 22 February 2026; "xing", meaning "star", is added to differentiate it from the asteroid 12418 Tongling.
