= 21 Camelopardalis =

Star in the constellation Camelopardalis

Observation data Epoch J2000.0 Equinox ICRS
- Constellation: Camelopardalis
- Right ascension: 05^{h} 40^{m} 28.99683^{s}
- Declination: +61° 56′ 56.0999″
- Apparent magnitude (V): 6.867

Characteristics
- Spectral type: A5
- B−V color index: +0.22

Astrometry
Radial velocity (R_{v})	−15.5 km/s
Proper motion (μ)	RA: −6.911 mas/yr Dec.: +1.818 mas/yr
Parallax (π)	5.0131±0.0864 mas
Distance	650 ± 10 ly (199 ± 3 pc)
Absolute magnitude (M_{V})	0.90

Details
Radius	3.121 R_{☉}
Luminosity	35.66 L_{☉}
Temperature	7,619 K

Other designations
- 21 Cam, BD+61°806, FK5 1150, HD 37136, HIP 26700, SAO 13564

Database references
SIMBAD	data

21 Camelopardalis is a star in the northern circumpolar constellation of Camelopardalis, located around 650 light years away from the Sun. It is a challenge to view with the naked eye even under excellent viewing conditions, having an apparent visual magnitude of 6.9. This is one of the fainter stars with a Flamsteed designation, one of only 220 below the magnitude cutoff for the Bright Star Catalogue. It is moving closer to the Earth with a heliocentric radial velocity of −15.5 km/s.

The spectral type for 21 Camelopardalis is given only as A5 with no published luminosity class. It is treated as a normal main sequence star, although it is calculated to be larger and more luminous than a typical A5 main sequence star. Based upon changes to its proper motion over time, this is a probable astrometric binary.
