= BN Camelopardalis =

Star in the constellation Camelopardalis

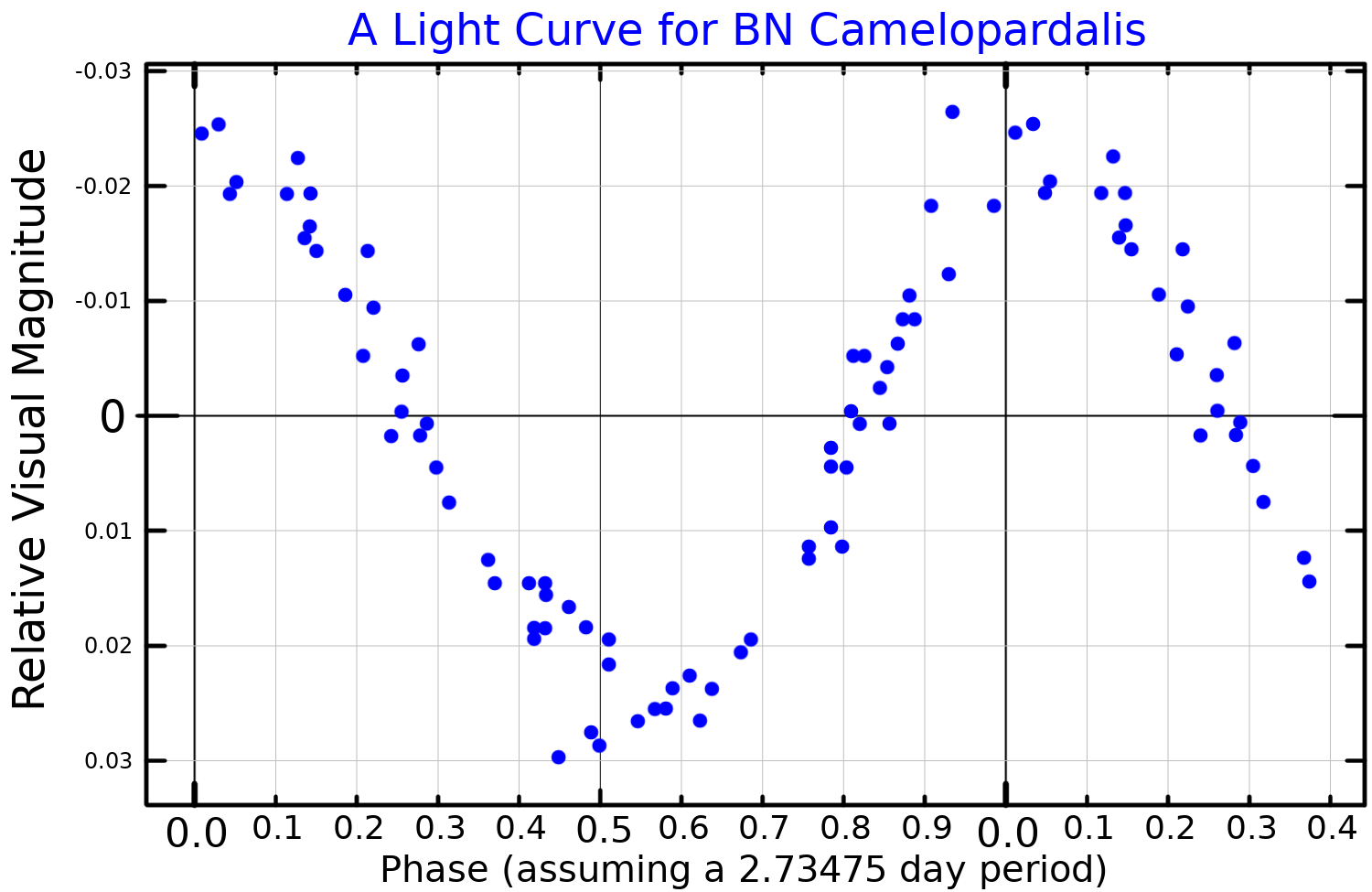
- A visual band light curve for BN Camelopardalis, adapted from Adelman (1997)

Observation data Epoch J2000 Equinox ICRS
- Constellation: Camelopardalis
- Right ascension: 05^{h} 12^{m} 22.43769^{s}
- Declination: +73° 56′ 48.0382″
- Apparent magnitude (V): 5.34 to 5.58

Characteristics
- Spectral type: B9.5VpSi
- B−V color index: −0.108±0.003
- Variable type: α^{2} CVn

Astrometry
Radial velocity (R_{v})	+9.3±2.8 km/s
Proper motion (μ)	RA: +6.033 mas/yr Dec.: –27.088 mas/yr
Parallax (π)	10.5286±0.2275 mas
Distance	310 ± 7 ly (95 ± 2 pc)
Absolute magnitude (M_{V})	+0.13

Details
Mass	3.05±0.13 M_{☉}
Radius	2.9±0.4 R_{☉}
Luminosity	110 L_{☉}
Surface gravity (log g)	4.15±0.11 cgs
Temperature	11,561 K
Rotation	2.73332 days
Rotational velocity (v sin i)	23 km/s

Other designations
- BN Cam, BD+73°274, FK5 2387, HD 32650, HIP 24254, HR 1643, SAO 5455

Database references
SIMBAD	data

BN Camelopardalis is a suspected astrometric binary in the northern circumpolar constellation of Camelopardalis. It appears as a variable star that is visible to the naked eye as a dim, white-hued point of light with an apparent visual magnitude that fluctuates around 5.5. The system is located at a distance of around 310 light years from the Sun based on parallax, and is drifting further away with a radial velocity of +9 km/s.

The visible component is a weakly magnetic chemically peculiar star with a stellar classification of B9.5VpSi, matching a B-type main-sequence star with an anomalous abundance of silicon.

John Ernest Winzer announced that the star is a variable star, in 1974. It was given its variable star designation in 1981. It ranges in brightness from 5.34 down to 5.58. Samus et al. (2017) have it categorized as an α^{2} Canum Venaticorum variable with a period of 2.7347 days, while Adelman and Sutton (2007) found a period of 2.73501 days. The star has three times the mass and radius of the Sun and is radiating 110 times the Sun's luminosity from its photosphere at an effective temperature of 11,561 K.
