= HD 24479 =

Star in the constellation Camelopardalis

- Location of HD 117566 on the map (circled)

Observation data Epoch J2000.0 Equinox ICRS
- Constellation: Camelopardalis
- Right ascension: 03^{h} 57^{m} 25.44460^{s}
- Declination: +63° 04′ 20.1498″
- Apparent magnitude (V): 5.04

Characteristics
- Evolutionary stage: main sequence
- Spectral type: B9 IV or B9.5 V
- U−B color index: −0.16
- B−V color index: −0.10

Astrometry
Radial velocity (R_{v})	4.6±2.8 km/s
Proper motion (μ)	RA: +7.146 mas/yr Dec.: +6.420 mas/yr
Parallax (π)	8.4614±0.0947 mas
Distance	385 ± 4 ly (118 ± 1 pc)
Absolute magnitude (M_{V})	−0.27

Details
Mass	3.14±0.05 M_{☉}
Radius	4.08±0.20 R_{☉}
Luminosity	156^{+12}_{−11} L_{☉}
Surface gravity (log g)	3.69±0.06 cgs
Temperature	10,520^{+72}_{−73} K
Metallicity [Fe/H]	−0.20 dex
Rotational velocity (v sin i)	85±16 km/s
Age	256±20 Myr

Other designations
- 22 H. Camelopardalis,AG+62°326, BD+62°628, FK5 2281, GC 4730, HD 24479, HIP 18505, HR 1204, SAO 12969

Database references
SIMBAD	data

HD 24479, also designated as HR 1204, is a solitary, bluish-white hued star located in the northern circumpolar constellation Camelopardalis. The star is visible to the naked eye with an apparent visual magnitude of 5.04. Based on Gaia DR3 parallax measurements, it is located 385 light years from the Sun. However, it is receding with a somewhat constrained heliocentric radial velocity of 4.6 km/s. At its current distance, HD 24479's brightness is diminished by 0.29 magnitudes due to interstellar dust.

In 1932, HD 24479 was identified as a Be star by Olin C. Wilson at the Mount Wilson Observatory. In 1969, astronomer Anne Cowley and her colleagues listed a stellar classification of B9.5 V, matching a B-type main-sequence star. Slettebak (1982) gave it a class of B9 IV, suggesting this instead an evolving subgiant star. Zorec and Royer (2012) model it to be an evolved dwarf star that has completed 85.9% of its main sequence lifetime.

It has an estimated 3.14 times the mass of the Sun and 4.1 times the Sun's radius, which is large for its class. The star is radiating 156 times the Sun's luminosity from its photosphere at an effective temperature of 10,250 K. HD 24479 is estimated to be 256 million years old and is spinning quickly with a projected rotational velocity of 85 km/s.
