= 18 Camelopardalis =

Star in the constellation Camelopardalis

Observation data Epoch J2000 Equinox ICRS
- Constellation: Camelopardalis
- Right ascension: 05^{h} 32^{m} 33.7997^{s}
- Declination: +57° 13′ 15.855″
- Apparent magnitude (V): 6.44

Characteristics
- Spectral type: F8 V
- U−B color index: +0.11
- B−V color index: +0.587

Astrometry
Radial velocity (R_{v})	+33.264±0.0160 km/s
Proper motion (μ)	RA: +111.231 mas/yr Dec.: −224.686 mas/yr
Parallax (π)	23.0161±0.0633 mas
Distance	141.7 ± 0.4 ly (43.4 ± 0.1 pc)
Absolute magnitude (M_{V})	3.234+0.076 −0.079

Details
Mass	1.201+0.015 −0.014 M_{☉}
Radius	1.93+0.08 −0.04 R_{☉}
Luminosity	4.242±0.015 L_{☉}
Surface gravity (log g)	3.95±0.02 cgs
Temperature	5,908±38 K
Metallicity [Fe/H]	−0.02±0.04 dex
Rotational velocity (v sin i)	5 km/s
Age	5.28+0.25 −0.19 Gyr

Other designations
- 18 Cam, BD+57°889, FK5 1150, HD 36066, HIP 25973, HR 1828, SAO 25241

Database references
SIMBAD	data

18 Camelopardalis is a yellow-white-hued star in the northern circumpolar constellation of Camelopardalis. It has an apparent visual magnitude is 6.44, which makes it a challenge to view with the naked eye. Using the measured annual parallax shift of 23.02 mas, its distance can be estimated at 142 light-years. The star is moving away from the Sun with a radial velocity of +33 km/s and has an annual proper motion of 0.251 arcseconds.

The spectrum of this star matches a stellar classification of F8 V, indicating this is an ordinary F-type main-sequence star. It is around 5.3 billion years old and is spinning with a projected rotational velocity of 5 km/s. The star has 1.2 times the mass of the Sun, 1.93 times the Sun's radius, and has near solar abundances of elements. The star is radiating 4.24 times the Sun's luminosity from its photosphere at an effective temperature of 5,908 K.
