= HD 21447 =

Probable binary star in the constellation Camelopardalis

Observation data Epoch J2000 Equinox ICRS
- Constellation: Camelopardalis
- Right ascension: 03^{h} 30^{m} 00.18302^{s}
- Declination: +55° 27′ 06.5158″
- Apparent magnitude (V): 5.09

Characteristics
- Evolutionary stage: main sequence
- Spectral type: A1 Va
- B−V color index: 0.022±0.015

Astrometry
Radial velocity (R_{v})	−1.9±0.9 km/s
Proper motion (μ)	RA: −46.08 mas/yr Dec.: −11.07 mas/yr
Parallax (π)	16.42±0.29 mas
Distance	199 ± 4 ly (61 ± 1 pc)
Absolute magnitude (M_{V})	1.17

Details
Mass	2.32 M_{☉}
Radius	1.9 R_{☉}
Luminosity	32.16 L_{☉}
Surface gravity (log g)	4.06 cgs
Temperature	10,049±342 K
Rotational velocity (v sin i)	182 km/s
Age	146 Myr

Other designations
- NSV 1159, BD+54°684, HD 21447, HIP 16292, HR 1046, SAO 24064, WDS J03300+5527A

Database references
SIMBAD	data

HD 21447 is a probable binary star system located in the constellation Camelopardalis. The star is also known as HR 1046. It can be viewed with the naked eye, having an apparent visual magnitude of 5.09. Based upon an annual parallax shift of 16.42±0.29 mas, it is located some 199 light years from the Sun. It is a candidate for membership in the Ursa Major Moving Group.

The primary component is A-type main-sequence star with a stellar classification of A1 Va. It is around 146 million years old and is spinning with a projected rotational velocity of 182 km/s. The star has an estimated 2.32 times the mass of the Sun and about 1.9 times the Sun's radius. It is radiating around 32 times the Sun's luminosity from its photosphere at an effective temperature of 10,049 K. The companion is visual magnitude 9.4 star at an angular separation of 14.8″.
