= HD 23089 =

Spectroscopic binary star system in the constellation Camelopardalis

- Location of HD 23089 (circled in red)

Observation data Epoch J2000 Equinox ICRS
- Constellation: Camelopardalis
- Right ascension: 03^{h} 46^{m} 02.33087^{s}
- Declination: +63° 20′ 42.1639″
- Apparent magnitude (V): 4.79

Characteristics
- Spectral type: G2II-III + B9V
- U−B color index: +0.24
- B−V color index: +0.79
- R−I color index: 0.53

Astrometry
Radial velocity (R_{v})	-2.4 km/s
Proper motion (μ)	RA: -0.94 mas/yr Dec.: -8.41 mas/yr
Parallax (π)	4.08±0.66 mas
Distance	approx. 800 ly (approx. 250 pc)
Absolute magnitude (M_{V})	−2.70 – −1.50

Orbit
Period (P)	6,124±3 d
Eccentricity (e)	0.678±0.003
Inclination (i)	87±4°
Periastron epoch (T)	MJD45850±3
Argument of periastron (ω) (secondary)	136.5±0.6°
Semi-amplitude (K_{1}) (primary)	15.87±0.08 km/s
Semi-amplitude (K_{2}) (secondary)	17.6±0.34 km/s

Details

HD 23089 A
Mass	5.0±0.24 M_{☉}
Radius	41±7.3 R_{☉}
Luminosity	1,150 L_{☉}
Surface gravity (log g)	2.88 cgs
Temperature	5,250 K
Metallicity [Fe/H]	−0.28 dex

HD 23089 B
Mass	4.5±0.21 M_{☉}
Radius	5.3±0.9 R_{☉}
Luminosity	708 L_{☉}
Temperature	13,000±300 K
Rotational velocity (v sin i)	18 km/s

Other designations
- BD+62°604, HD 23089, HIP 17587, HR 1129, SAO 12891

Database references
SIMBAD	data

HD 23089 is a spectroscopic binary star in the northern constellation of Camelopardalis. Based on stellar parallax measurements made by Hipparcos, the system is about 800 ly (250 pc) away from the Sun.

The system consists of a cooler giant star and hotter main sequence companion. The pair orbit each other every 6,124 days, on an orbit that is relatively eccentric, at 0.678. Unpublished speckle observations suggest that the orbit is tilted towards the Earth's line of sight, and it has a relatively high inclination of about 87 degrees.
