= 36 Camelopardalis =

Binary star system in the constellation Camelopardalis

Observation data Epoch J2000.0 Equinox ICRS
- Constellation: Camelopardalis
- Right ascension: 06^{h} 12^{m} 51.06255^{s}
- Declination: +65° 43′ 06.3160″
- Apparent magnitude (V): 5.344

Characteristics
- Spectral type: K1 III-IIIb CH-0.5
- U−B color index: +2.708
- B−V color index: +0.764

Astrometry
Radial velocity (R_{v})	+1.15±0.13 km/s
Proper motion (μ)	RA: +6.240 mas/yr Dec.: −31.308 mas/yr
Parallax (π)	4.5905±0.0728 mas
Distance	710 ± 10 ly (218 ± 3 pc)
Absolute magnitude (M_{V})	−1.33

Details
Mass	1.24 M_{☉}
Radius	42 R_{☉}
Luminosity	714 L_{☉}
Surface gravity (log g)	1.26 cgs
Temperature	4,589 K
Metallicity [Fe/H]	−0.11 dex
Rotational velocity (v sin i)	3.0 km/s

Other designations
- 36 Cam, BD+65°517, FK5 233, GC 7856, HD 41927, HIP 2940, HR 2165, SAO 13756

Database references
SIMBAD	data

36 Camelopardalis is a single star in the northern circumpolar constellation of Camelopardalis. It is visible to the naked eye as a dim point of light with an apparent visual magnitude of +5.3. Parallax measurements provide a distance estimate of approximately 710 light years away from the Sun, and it is drifting away from the Earth with a radial velocity of −1.15 km/s.

36 Camelopardalis has a stellar classification of K1 III-IIIb, which indicates that it is a K-type giant star with a mild underabundance of CH molecules in its spectrum. At present it has 1.24 times the mass of the Sun but has expanded to an enlarged diameter of 42 R_{☉}. It shines at 714 L_{☉} from its photosphere at an effective temperature of 4,589 K, giving it an orange glow. 36 Cam's metallicity is around solar level and spins slowly with a projected rotational velocity of 3 km/s.
