= 4 Camelopardalis =

Probable multiple star system in the constellation Camelopardalis

Observation data Epoch J2000 Equinox J2000
- Constellation: Camelopardalis
- Right ascension: 04^{h} 48^{m} 00.2729^{s}
- Declination: +56° 45′ 25.837″
- Apparent magnitude (V): 5.29

Characteristics
- Spectral type: A3m
- U−B color index: 0.12
- B−V color index: 0.246±0.003

Astrometry
Radial velocity (R_{v})	+22.50±0.9 km/s
Proper motion (μ)	RA: +52.892 mas/yr Dec.: −140.618 mas/yr
Parallax (π)	18.4464±0.1109 mas
Distance	177 ± 1 ly (54.2 ± 0.3 pc)
Absolute magnitude (M_{V})	1.68

Orbit
Primary	Aa
Companion	Ab
Period (P)	90 yr
Semi-major axis (a)	0.503″
Eccentricity (e)	0.87
Inclination (i)	120.0°
Longitude of the node (Ω)	54.5°
Argument of periastron (ω) (secondary)	235.9°

Details
Mass	2.01 M_{☉}
Radius	2.57+0.05 −0.17 R_{☉}
Luminosity	17.64 L_{☉}
Surface gravity (log g)	3.98 cgs
Temperature	7,700 K
Metallicity [Fe/H]	+0.27 dex
Rotational velocity (v sin i)	75 km/s
Age	560 Myr

Other designations
- 4 Cam, BD+56°973, FK5 175, HD 30121, HIP 22287, HR 1511, SAO 24829

Database references
SIMBAD	data

4 Camelopardalis is a probable multiple star in the northern constellation of Camelopardalis, located 177 light years away from the Sun, based upon parallax. With a combined apparent visual magnitude of 5.29, it is visible to the naked eye as a faint, white-hued star. The pair have a relatively high proper motion, traversing the celestial sphere at an angular rate of 0.158″ per year. The system's proper motion makes it a candidate for membership in the IC 2391 supercluster. They are moving away from the Earth with a heliocentric radial velocity of 22.5 km/s.

The brighter member, designated component A, is classified as an Am star, which indicates that the spectrum shows abnormalities of certain elements. It is an estimated 560 million years old and is spinning with a projected rotational velocity of 75 The star has 2.01 times the mass of the Sun and 2.57 times the Sun's radius. It is radiating 18 times the Sun's luminosity from its photosphere at an effective temperature of 7,700 K.

There is a faint, magnitude 9.49 companion at an angular separation of 0.610″ – component B; the pair most likely form a binary systemwith a period of about 90 years. There is also a 13th-magnitude visual companion 13″ away which shares a common proper motion and parallax. Another listed companion, a 12th-magnitude star nearly 2′ away, is probably unrelated.
