= HR 3082 =

Double star in the constellation Camelopardalis

Observation data Epoch J2000 Equinox ICRS
- Constellation: Camelopardalis
- Right ascension: 08^{h} 04^{m} 47.0589^{s}
- Declination: +79° 28′ 46.610″
- Apparent magnitude (V): 5.39

Characteristics
- Evolutionary stage: main sequence
- Spectral type: A0p Si or B9.5 IVs
- B−V color index: −0.040±0.002

Astrometry
Radial velocity (R_{v})	+2.7±0.8 km/s
Proper motion (μ)	RA: −28.922(74) mas/yr Dec.: −50.085(101) mas/yr
Parallax (π)	9.5700±0.0876 mas
Distance	341 ± 3 ly (104.5 ± 1.0 pc)
Absolute magnitude (M_{V})	0.32±0.12

Details
Mass	2.65±0.06 M_{☉}
Radius	2.89 R_{☉}
Luminosity	74+9 −8 L_{☉}
Surface gravity (log g)	3.94±0.14 cgs
Temperature	10,795±367 K
Rotational velocity (v sin i)	30 km/s
Age	36 Myr

Other designations
- BD+79°265, FK5 2617, HD 64486, HIP 39538, HR 2527, SAO 6392, WDS J08048+7929AB

Database references
SIMBAD	data

HR 3082 is a double star in the northern circumpolar constellation of Camelopardalis. It is faintly visible to the naked eye with an apparent visual magnitude of 5.39. The system is moving closer to the Sun with a heliocentric radial velocity of +2.7 km/s. It is currently at a distance of around 341 light years, based upon an annual parallax shift of 9.57 mas.

The brighter component is a magnetic, mild Ap star that displays an overabundance of silicon in its spectrum. Cowley et al. (1969) listed a stellar classification of A0p Si, while Abt and Morrell (1995) have it pegged as a subgiant star with a class of B9.5 IVs. It has an estimated 2.65 times the mass of the Sun and 2.89 times the Sun's radius. The star is radiating 74 times the Sun's luminosity from its photosphere at an effective temperature of 10,795 K.

The fainter component is a magnitude 9.6 star at an angular separation of 0.4″ along a position angle (PA) of 84°, as of 2009. This is most likely a visual companion located along the same line of sight. There is a magnitude 13.6 visual companion at a separation of 6.4″ along a PA of 169°, as of 2016.
