= 5 Camelopardalis =

Star in the constellation Camelopardalis

Observation data Epoch J2000 Equinox J2000
- Constellation: Camelopardalis
- Right ascension: 04^{h} 55^{m} 03.13350^{s}
- Declination: +55° 15′ 32.8530″
- Apparent magnitude (V): 5.522

Characteristics
- Spectral type: B9.5 V or B9.5 IV
- U−B color index: +0.001
- B−V color index: +0.038

Astrometry
Radial velocity (R_{v})	+2.4 km/s
Proper motion (μ)	RA: −15.304 mas/yr Dec.: −11.501 mas/yr
Parallax (π)	4.2348±0.0951 mas
Distance	770 ± 20 ly (236 ± 5 pc)
Absolute magnitude (M_{V})	−0.84

Details
Mass	2.15 M_{☉}
Radius	5.1 R_{☉}
Luminosity	226 L_{☉}
Surface gravity (log g)	3.36 cgs
Temperature	9,931 K
Rotational velocity (v sin i)	102 km/s
Age	277 Myr

Other designations
- 5 Cam, BD+55°941, FK5 2367, HD 30958, HIP 22854, HR 1555, SAO 24904, WDS J04551+5516A

Database references
SIMBAD	data

5 Camelopardalis is a binary star system in the northern circumpolar constellation of Camelopardalis, located about 770 light years away from the Sun as determined using parallax. With an apparent magnitude of 5.5, it can be seen with the naked eye as a faint, blue-white hued star. The system is moving further from the Earth with a heliocentric radial velocity of +2.4 km/s.

The primary component is a B-type main sequence star with a stellar classification of B9.5 V. However, Abt and Morrell (1995) found a luminosity class of IV, suggesting it is instead a subgiant star that is evolving off the main sequence. It has a high rate of spin with a projected rotational velocity of 102 km/s and has 2.15 times the mass of the Sun. The star is radiating 226 times the luminosity of the Sun from its photosphere at an effective temperature of 9,931 K.

The magnitude 12.9 common proper motion companion lies at an angular separation of 12.9″. It appears to be slightly smaller and cooler than the Sun.
