= 23 Camelopardalis =

Star in the constellation Camelopardalis

Observation data Epoch J2000.0 Equinox ICRS
- Constellation: Camelopardalis
- Right ascension: 05^{h} 44^{m} 08.44597^{s}
- Declination: +61° 28′ 35.5255″
- Apparent magnitude (V): 6.168

Characteristics
- Evolutionary stage: red clump
- Spectral type: G5 III:
- B−V color index: 0.881

Astrometry
Radial velocity (R_{v})	−2.47±0.17 km/s
Proper motion (μ)	RA: −11.312 mas/yr Dec.: +0.766 mas/yr
Parallax (π)	7.5250±0.0371 mas
Distance	433 ± 2 ly (132.9 ± 0.7 pc)
Absolute magnitude (M_{V})	0.95

Details
Mass	2.13 M_{☉}
Radius	9.84 R_{☉}
Luminosity	60.255 L_{☉}
Surface gravity (log g)	3.15±0.18 cgs
Temperature	5,183±51 K
Metallicity [Fe/H]	−0.01±0.05 dex
Age	1.50 Gyr

Other designations
- 23 Cam, BD+61°816, HD 37638, HIP 27046, HR 1943, SAO 13590

Database references
SIMBAD	data

23 Camelopardalis is a star in the northern circumpolar constellation of Camelopardalis, located 433 light years away from the Sun. It is just visible to the naked eye as a dim, yellow-hued star with an apparent visual magnitude of 6.17. The object is moving closer to the Sun with a heliocentric radial velocity of −2.5 km/s.

With a stellar classification of G5 III:, 23 Camelopardalis appears to be an aging giant star that has exhausted the hydrogen at its core and evolved away from the main sequence, although the ':' denotes some uncertainty about the classification. It is a red clump giant, which indicates it is on the horizontal branch and is generating energy through helium fusion at its core. The star is 1.5 billion years old with more than double the mass of the Sun and almost 10 times the Sun's radius. It is radiating 60 times the Sun's luminosity from its enlarged photosphere at an effective temperature of 5,183 K.
