= 42 Camelopardalis =

Star in the constellation Camelopardalis

Observation data Epoch J2000.0 Equinox J2000.0
- Constellation: Camelopardalis
- Right ascension: 06^{h} 50^{m} 57.08877^{s}
- Declination: +67° 34′ 18.9814″
- Apparent magnitude (V): 5.14

Characteristics
- Spectral type: B4 IV or B5 V
- B−V color index: −0.152±0.002

Astrometry
Radial velocity (R_{v})	3.2±1.2 km/s
Proper motion (μ)	RA: +0.55 mas/yr Dec.: +5.02 mas/yr
Parallax (π)	4.2456±0.2405 mas
Distance	770 ± 40 ly (240 ± 10 pc)
Absolute magnitude (M_{V})	−2.10

Details
Mass	6.5±0.2 M_{☉}
Radius	5.6 R_{☉}
Luminosity (bolometric)	2,460 L_{☉}
Temperature	16,550 K
Rotational velocity (v sin i)	105 km/s
Age	50.1±11.7 Myr

Other designations
- 42 Cam, BD+67°454, FK5 2523, GC 8902, HD 48879, HIP 32864, HR 2490, SAO 13973

Database references
SIMBAD	data

42 Camelopardalis is a single star in the constellation Camelopardalis, located roughly 770 light years away from the Sun. It is visible to the naked eye as a faint, blue-white hued star with an apparent visual magnitude of 5.14. The visual magnitude of the star is diminished by an extinction of 0.22 due to interstellar dust. It is moving further from the Earth with a heliocentric radial velocity of 3 km/s. 42 Camelopardalis has a peculiar velocity of 24.4+1.9
−2.1 km/s and may be a runaway star.

Observations made in 1933 appeared to suggest this could be a Beta Cephei variable, but this was not confirmed by follow-up measurements. The star has a stellar classification of B4 IV, matching a B-type subgiant star. It has 6.5 times the mass of the Sun and about 5.6 times the Sun's radius. 42 Camelopardalis is 50 million years old with a high rotation rate, showing a projected rotational velocity of 105 km/s. It is radiating 2,460 times the luminosity of the Sun from its photosphere at an effective temperature of 16,550 K. This star is notable as demonstrating similarities between the short-period B-type variables and the Cepheid variables.
