= HD 46588 =

Star in the constellation Camelopardalis

- Location of HD 46588 (circled in red)

Observation data Epoch J2000.0 Equinox ICRS
- Constellation: Camelopardalis
- A
- Right ascension: 06^{h} 46^{m} 14.1500^{s}
- Declination: +79° 33′ 53.319″
- Apparent magnitude (V): +5.44
- B
- Right ascension: 06^{h} 46^{m} 27.5604^{s}
- Declination: +79° 35′ 04.513″

Characteristics

A
- Evolutionary stage: main sequence
- Spectral type: F7 V
- U−B color index: −0.02
- B−V color index: +0.53

B
- Evolutionary stage: brown dwarf
- Spectral type: L9

Astrometry

A
Radial velocity (R_{v})	15.30±0.13 km/s
Proper motion (μ)	RA: −99.163 mas/yr Dec.: −604.042 mas/yr
Parallax (π)	54.9380±0.0595 mas
Distance	59.37 ± 0.06 ly (18.20 ± 0.02 pc)
Absolute magnitude (M_{V})	+4.18

Details

A
Mass	1.13^{+0.03}_{−0.02} M_{☉}
Radius	1.16±0.04 R_{☉}
Luminosity	1.82 L_{☉}
Surface gravity (log g)	4.40±0.02 cgs
Temperature	6,273±91 K
Metallicity [Fe/H]	−0.12±0.06 dex
Rotation	10.3 d
Rotational velocity (v sin i)	2.50±1.74 km/s
Age	1.27^{+1.65}_{−0.22} Gyr

B
Mass	0.064+0.008 −0.019 M_{☉}
Temperature	1360+50 −80 K

Other designations
- 23 H. Camelopardalis, AG+79°200, BD+79°212, GC 8711, GJ 240.1, HD 46588, HIP 32439, HR 2401, SAO 5946, WDS J06462+7934

Database references
SIMBAD	A
- B

HD 46588 (HR 2401; Gliese 240.1) is a star with a brown dwarf companion in the northern circumpolar constellation Camelopardalis. It has an apparent magnitude of 5.44, allowing it to be faintly seen with the naked eye. The object is relatively close at a distance of only 59 light-years but is receding with a heliocentric radial velocity of 15 km/s.

HD 46588 is an ordinary F-type main-sequence star with a spectral classification of F7 V. It has 113% the mass of the Sun and 119% its radius. It shines at 182% the luminosity of the Sun from its photosphere at an effective temperature of 6,273 K, giving it a yellow white glow. Isochronic measurements place HD 46588's age at 1.27 billion years, but it is poorly constrained. The star's metallicity is 76% that of the Sun and spins modestly with a projected rotational velocity of 6.63 km/s.

Due to the star's close proximity to Earth and similarity to the Sun, it has been well studied by astronomers. A brown dwarf companion, HD 46588 B, was discovered in a WISE survey in 2011, at a distance of 1420 AU from the primary. It has a mass of 67+8
−20 Jupiter masses and a temperature of 1360^{+50}_{−80} K. An infrared excess has been discovered around HD 46588, indicating a cold debris disk with a temperature of 60 K. In addition, a 2022 study detected a candidate planet around the star using the radial velocity method.

The HD 46588 A planetary system
Companion (in order from star)	Mass	Semimajor axis (AU)	Orbital period (days)	Eccentricity	Inclination (°)	Radius
b (unconfirmed)	≥0.25+0.06 −0.04 M_{J}	—	223±3	0.42+0.19 −0.14	—	—
dust disk	26.34 AU				—	—
