= 30 Camelopardalis =

Star in the constellation Camelopardalis

- Location of 30 Cam on the map (circled)

Observation data Epoch J2000.0 Equinox ICRS
- Constellation: Camelopardalis
- Right ascension: 05^{h} 52^{m} 17.25442^{s}
- Declination: +58° 57′ 50.7189″
- Apparent magnitude (V): 6.13±0.01

Characteristics
- Evolutionary stage: main sequence
- Spectral type: A0 Vs
- U−B color index: −0.14
- B−V color index: −0.04

Astrometry
Radial velocity (R_{v})	12±3.7 km/s
Proper motion (μ)	RA: −0.939 mas/yr Dec.: −20.732 mas/yr
Parallax (π)	6.235±0.0381 mas
Distance	523 ± 3 ly (160.4 ± 1.0 pc)
Absolute magnitude (M_{V})	+0.29

Details
Mass	2.77^{+0.36}_{−0.44} M_{☉}
Radius	3.20±0.16 R_{☉}
Luminosity	107.9^{+1.4}_{−1.5} L_{☉}
Surface gravity (log g)	3.87^{+0.09}_{−0.07} cgs
Temperature	10,957 K
Metallicity [Fe/H]	0.00 dex
Rotational velocity (v sin i)	425: km/s
Age	294±40 Myr

Other designations
- 30 Cam, AG+58°504, BD+58°863, GC 7327, HD 38831, HIP 27731, HR 2006, SAO 25419

Database references
SIMBAD	data

30 Camelopardalis (HD 38831; HR 2006), or simply 30 Cam, is a solitary star located in the northern circumpolar constellation Camelopardalis. It has an apparent magnitude of 6.13, placing it near the limit for naked eye visibility, even under ideal conditions. Gaia DR3 parallax measurements imply a distance of 523 light-years and it is currently drifting away with a somewhat constrained radial velocity of 12 km/s. At its current distance, 30 Cam's brightness is diminished by an interstellar extinction of 0.18 magnitudes and it has an absolute magnitude of +0.29.

30 Cam has a stellar classification of A0 Vs, indicating that it is an A-type main-sequence star that is generating energy via hydrogen fusion at its core. In addition, the absorption lines in 30 Cam's spectrum are narrow and sharp, possibly due to slow rotation. It has 2.77 times the mass of the Sun and 3.20 times the radius of the Sun. It radiates 107.9 times the luminosity of the Sun from its photosphere at an effective temperature of 10,957 K, giving it a bluish-white hue when viewed in the night sky. 30 Cam's ratio of its iron abundance to the amount of hydrogen is similar to the Sun's; it is estimated to be 294 million years old.

There have been many disagreements regarding the star's projected rotational velocity. Palmer et al. (1968) devised a velocity of 425 km/s, the value being highly uncertain. This does not correlate with the spectral classification mentioned earlier. A 1974 focusing on bright hydrogen-emission stars stated that 30 Cam is indeed a slowly rotating star, but it does not give a value for its rotational velocity.
