= 29 Camelopardalis =

Double star in the constellation Camelopardalis

Observation data Epoch J2000.0 Equinox ICRS
- Constellation: Camelopardalis
- Right ascension: 05^{h} 50^{m} 33.8729^{s}
- Declination: +56° 55′ 08.182″
- Apparent magnitude (V): 6.590±0.009

Characteristics

29 Cam A
- Spectral type: A4 IV-V
- U−B color index: +0.13
- B−V color index: +0.09

29 Cam B
- Spectral type: A3 V

Astrometry

29 Cam A
Radial velocity (R_{v})	3.9±2 km/s
Proper motion (μ)	RA: –19.460 mas/yr Dec.: –4.249 mas/yr
Parallax (π)	6.7370±0.0607 mas
Distance	484 ± 4 ly (148 ± 1 pc)
Absolute magnitude (M_{V})	+0.71

29 Cam B
Proper motion (μ)	RA: +2.585 mas/yr Dec.: –0.570 mas/yr
Parallax (π)	1.6375±0.0483 mas
Distance	1,990 ± 60 ly (610 ± 20 pc)

Details

29 Cam A
Mass	2.47 ± 0.08 M_{☉}
Radius	3.49+0.14 −0.12 R_{☉}
Luminosity	58.9+8.9 −7.6 L_{☉}
Surface gravity (log g)	3.77 cgs
Temperature	8,337 ± 96 K
Rotational velocity (v sin i)	123 km/s
Age	380 ± 14 Myr

29 Cam B
Mass	2.12 M_{☉}
Radius	2.06 R_{☉}
Luminosity	15.043 L_{☉}
Temperature	7911 K
Rotational velocity (v sin i)	110±8 km/s

Other designations
- BD+56°1065, HD 38618, HIP 27592, HR 1992, SAO 25403, WDS J05506+5655A

Database references
SIMBAD	data

29 Camelopardalis (29 Cam) is a double star in the circumpolar constellation Camelopardalis. With an apparent magnitude of 6.59, it is right below the max visibility to the naked eye, and can only be viewed under phenomenal conditions. The star is located 484 light years away based on parallax, but is drifting further away with a radial velocity of 3.9 km/s.

== 29 Cam A ==
29 Cam A has a classification of A4IV-V, which suggests that this star is beginning to evolve off the main sequence. Zorec et al. models it as a star that has completed 90.6% of the main sequence, which correlates to an age of 380 million years. 29 Cam now has 2.47 the mass of the Sun, and 3.49 times its radius. It radiates at 58.9 times the luminosity of the Sun from an effective temperature of 8,337 K, which gives it a white hue of an A-type star. 29 Cam spins rapidly at a projected rotational velocity of 123 km/s despite its evolved state.

== 29 Cam B ==
29 Cam has a companion designated BD+56 1065B, which is a 10 magnitude star. According to the proper motion, this star is unrelated to the primary, and is four times further than the primary. The companion is relatively cooler and less luminous than the primary.
