= HD 26764 =

Star in the constellation Camelopardalis

- Location of HD 26764 on the map (circled)

Observation data Epoch J2000.0 Equinox J2000.0
- Constellation: Camelopardalis
- Right ascension: 04^{h} 16^{m} 43.0917^{s}
- Declination: +53° 36′ 42.481″
- Apparent magnitude (V): 5.19±0.01

Characteristics
- Evolutionary stage: main sequence
- Spectral type: A2 Vn or A1 Vn
- B−V color index: +0.05

Astrometry
Radial velocity (R_{v})	−3.0±3.1 km/s
Proper motion (μ)	RA: −17.700 mas/yr Dec.: −0.218 mas/yr
Parallax (π)	12.2443±0.1844 mas
Distance	266 ± 4 ly (82 ± 1 pc)
Absolute magnitude (M_{V})	+0.21

Details
Mass	2.74±0.08 M_{☉}
Radius	3.38±0.17 R_{☉}
Luminosity	94.1^{+13.7}_{−12} L_{☉}
Surface gravity (log g)	3.79±0.07 cgs
Temperature	9,825±334 K
Metallicity [Fe/H]	−0.70 dex
Rotational velocity (v sin i)	205 km/s
Age	388 Myr

Other designations
- 14 H. Camelopardalis, AG+53°373, BD+53°750, FK5 2310, GC 5132, HD 26764, HIP 19949, HR 1314, SAO 24512

Database references
SIMBAD	data

HD 26764, also known as HR 1314 or rarely 14 H. Camelopardalis, is a solitary white hued star located in the northern circumpolar constellation Camelopardalis. It has an apparent magnitude of 5.19, making it faintly to the naked eye if viewed under good conditions. Gaia DR3 parallax measurements place the object at a distance of 266 light years and is drifting closer with a poorly constrained heliocentric radial velocity of 3 km/s. At its current distance, HD 26764's brightness is diminished by 0.26 magnitudes due to interstellar dust.

HD 26764 has a stellar classification of either A2 Vn or A1 Vn. Both classes indicate that the object is an A-type main-sequence star with broad (nebulous) absorption lines due to rapid rotation. At present it has 2.74 times the mass of the Sun and 3.4 times the Sun's radius. It radiates 94 times the luminosity of the Sun from its photosphere at an effective temperature of 9,825 K. At the age of 388 million years, HD 26764 is a rather evolved dwarf star, having completed 91.2% of its main sequence lifetime. Like many hot stars, it spins rapidly with a projected rotational velocity of 205 km/s. An X-ray emission with a luminosity of 498.5×10^{20} W has been detected around the star. A-type stars are not expected to produce X-rays, so it must be coming from an unseen companion.
