= HD 26670 =

Star in the constellation Camelopardalis

Observation data Epoch J2000 Equinox ICRS
- Constellation: Camelopardalis
- Right ascension: 04^{h} 16^{m} 53.55609^{s}
- Declination: +61° 50′ 59.9671″
- Apparent magnitude (V): 5.70

Characteristics
- Evolutionary stage: main sequence
- Spectral type: B7 V or B5 Vn
- U−B color index: −0.52
- B−V color index: −0.14

Astrometry
| Radial velocity (R_{v}) | 0.4±2.8 km/s |
| Proper motion (μ) | RA: +6.504 mas/yr Dec.: −20.592 mas/yr |
| Parallax (π) | 6.6445±0.0565 mas |
| Distance | 491 ± 4 ly (151 ± 1 pc) |
| Absolute magnitude (M_{V}) | +0.01 |

Details
| Mass | 4±0.1 M_{☉} |
| Radius | 2.86±1.04 R_{☉} |
| Luminosity | 244^{+19}_{−18} L_{☉} |
| Surface gravity (log g) | 3.92/4.20 (Note: The values for the surface gravity are for the equator and poles respectively) cgs |
| Temperature | 13,934±70 K |
| Rotational velocity (v sin i) | 270±24 km/s |
| Age | 57±28 Myr |

Other designations
- 26 H. Camelopardalis, AG+61°372, BD+61°387, GC 5123, HD 26670, HIP 19968, HR 1305, SAO 13075

Database references
| SIMBAD | data |

HD 26670, also known as HR 1305, is a star located in the northern circumpolar constellation of Camelopardalis, the giraffe. The object has been designated as 26 H. Camelopardalis, but is not commonly used in modern times. It has an apparent magnitude of 5.70, allowing it to be faintly visible to the naked eye. Based on parallax measurements from Gaia DR3, the object is estimated to be 491 light years away from the Solar System. It appears to be slowly receding with a heliocentric radial velocity of 0.4 km/s with a large uncertainty.

== Characteristics ==
This is a solitary, bluish-white hued B-type main-sequence star with a stellar classification of B7 V. It has also been given a class of B5 Vn with the addition of broad or nebulous absorption lines due to rapid rotation. It has 4 times the mass of the Sun and is estimated to be 57 million years old, having completed only a quarter of its main sequence lifetime. HD 26670 has 2.86 times the radius of the Sun and an effective temperature of 13,934 K. When combined, these parameters yield a luminosity 244 times greater than the Sun's from its photosphere. Like most hot stars, HD 26670 spins rapidly, having a projected rotational velocity of 270 km/s. Huang et al. (2010) give it a velocity of 311 km/s, which is 72% of its breakup velocity. As a result, the surface gravity is greater at the poles rather than the equator and it has an oblate shape.
