= 16 Camelopardalis =

A-type main sequence star in the constellation Camelopardalis

Observation data Epoch J2000 Equinox J2000
- Constellation: Camelopardalis
- Right ascension: 05^{h} 23^{m} 27.84195^{s}
- Declination: +57° 32′ 39.8364″
- Apparent magnitude (V): 5.28

Characteristics
- Evolutionary stage: main sequence
- Spectral type: A0Vn
- U−B color index: −0.07
- B−V color index: −0.03

Astrometry
Radial velocity (R_{v})	12.0±3.7 km/s
Proper motion (μ)	RA: +15.396 mas/yr Dec.: −54.447 mas/yr
Parallax (π)	9.3655±0.1506 mas
Distance	348 ± 6 ly (107 ± 2 pc)
Absolute magnitude (M_{V})	0.18

Details
Mass	2.80±0.04 M_{☉}
Radius	3.26 R_{☉}
Luminosity	96.6+7.2 −6.6 L_{☉}
Temperature	9,748+92 −87 K
Rotational velocity (v sin i)	217 km/s
Age	400 Myr

Other designations
- 16 Cam, BD+57°879, FK5 2402, HD 34787, HIP 25197, HR 1751, SAO 25161, WDS J05235+5733A

Database references
SIMBAD	data

16 Camelopardalis is a single star in the northern circumpolar constellation Camelopardalis, located 348 light years away from the Sun as determined from parallax measurements. It is visible to the naked eye as a faint, white-hued star with an apparent visual magnitude of 5.28. This object is moving further from the Earth with a heliocentric radial velocity of around 12 km/s.

This is an A-type main-sequence star with a stellar classification of A0 Vn, where the 'n' notation indicates "nebulous" lines due to rapid rotation. In the past it was misidentified as a Lambda Boötis star. It is around 400 million years old and is spinning with a projected rotational velocity of 217 km/s. The star has 2.8 times the mass of the Sun and 3.3 times the Sun's radius. It is radiating 97 times the Sun's luminosity from its photosphere at an effective temperature of 9,748 K.

An infrared excess indicates it has a dusty debris disk with a mean temperature of 120 K orbiting at a distance of 52 AU from the star. This disk has a combined mass equal to 2.1% the mass of the Earth.
