= HD 25291 =

Star in the constellation Camelopardalis

- location of HD 25291 in red

Observation data Epoch J2000.0 Equinox ICRS
- Constellation: Camelopardalis
- Right ascension: 04^{h} 04^{m} 27.16294^{s}
- Declination: +59° 09′ 19.8327″
- Apparent magnitude (V): 5.12

Characteristics
- Spectral type: F0 II
- U−B color index: +0.47
- B−V color index: +0.15
- Variable type: constant

Astrometry
Radial velocity (R_{v})	−20.3±0.8 km/s
Proper motion (μ)	RA: −3.380 mas/yr Dec.: +1.027 mas/yr
Parallax (π)	1.5558±0.1047 mas
Distance	2,100 ± 100 ly (640 ± 40 pc)
Absolute magnitude (M_{V})	−3.91

Details
Mass	8.78±0.65 M_{☉}
Radius	50.1 R_{☉}
Luminosity (bolometric)	9,878 L_{☉}
Surface gravity (log g)	1.87 cgs
Temperature	7,425 K
Metallicity [Fe/H]	−0.07 dex
Rotational velocity (v sin i)	6.8±2 km/s
Age	32 Myr

Other designations
- AG+59°399, BD+58°690, FK5 2290, GC 4858, HD 25291, HIP 19018, HR 1242, SAO 24384

Database references
SIMBAD	data

HD 25291, also known as HR 1242, is a solitary, yellowish-white hued star located in the northern circumpolar constellation Camelopardalis. It has an apparent magnitude of 5.12, making it one of the brighter members of this generally faint constellation. The object is relatively far at a distant of approximately 2,100 light years but is drifting closer with a heliocentric radial velocity of −20.3 km/s.

HD 25291 has a general stellar classification of F0 II, which indicates that it is an evolved early F-type bright giant. It has also been given a class of F2 Ia, instead suggesting a slightly cooler and more luminous supergiant. Nevertheless, it has 8.8 times the mass of the Sun but at an age of 32 million years, it has expanded to 50.1 times its girth. It radiates at a bolometric luminosity 9,878 times greather that of the Sun from its enlarged photosphere at an effective temperature of 7,425 K. HD 25291 is slightly metal deficient, with an iron abundance 85% of solar levels. It spins modestly with a projected rotational velocity of 6.8 km/s.

Tetzlaff et al. (2011) found the object to be a runaway star with a peculiar velocity of 25.7+1.9
−4.1 km/s, which is high compared to neighboring stars.
