= 2 Camelopardalis =

Triple star system in the constellation Camelopardalis

Observation data Epoch J2000 Equinox ICRS
- Constellation: Camelopardalis
- Right ascension: 04^{h} 39^{m} 58.06187^{s}
- Declination: +53° 28′ 22.4654″
- Apparent magnitude (V): 5.36

Characteristics

A
- Spectral type: A8V
- U−B color index: +0.05
- B−V color index: +0.34

Astrometry
| Radial velocity (R_{v}) | +20.1±3.2 km/s |
| Proper motion (μ) | RA: +44.269 mas/yr Dec.: −77.004 mas/yr |
| Parallax (π) | 15.3220±0.3790 mas |
| Distance | 213 ± 5 ly (65 ± 2 pc) |

Orbit
| Primary | 2 Cam A |
| Name | 2 Cam B |
| Period (P) | 26.34 ± 0.05 yr |
| Semi-major axis (a) | 0.1727 ± 0.0023″ |
| Eccentricity (e) | 0.846 ± 0.005 |
| Inclination (i) | 113.3 ± 3.4° |
| Longitude of the node (Ω) | 12.6 ± 2.5° |
| Periastron epoch (T) | B 1988.98 ± 0.03 |
| Argument of periastron (ω) (secondary) | 42.9 ± 2.6° |

Orbit
| Primary | 2 Cam AB |
| Name | 2 Cam C |
| Period (P) | 660 yr |
| Semi-major axis (a) | 1.666 ± 0.019″ |
| Eccentricity (e) | 0.405 ± 0.015 |
| Inclination (i) | 132.5 ± 1.9° |
| Longitude of the node (Ω) | 286.2 ± 1.8° |
| Periastron epoch (T) | B 2011.7 ± 2.7 |
| Argument of periastron (ω) (secondary) | 105.1 ± 5.4° |

Details

A
| Mass | 1.94 M_{☉} |

B
| Mass | 1.45 M_{☉} |

C
| Mass | 1.5 M_{☉} |

Other designations
- 2 Cam, BD+53°794, HD 29316, HIP 21730, HR 1466, SAO 24744, ADS 3358 ABC, CCDM J04400+5328ABC, WDS 04400+5328

Database references
| SIMBAD | 2 Cam |
- 2 Cam AB
- 2 Cam C

2 Camelopardalis is a triple star system in the northern circumpolar constellation of Camelopardalis, next to the southern constellation border with Perseus. It is dimly visible to the naked eye with a combined apparent visual magnitude of 5.36. The system is located at a distance of about 213 light-years (65 parsecs) from the Sun, based on its parallax. It is drifting further away with a radial velocity of +20 km/s.

The primary member of 2 Camelopardalis, designated component A, is an A-type main-sequence star with a spectral type of A8V. It has an apparent magnitude of 5.86, and has a secondary with an apparent magnitude of 7.35, designated component B. The two orbit each other on a very eccentric orbit with a period of 26.34 years. Further out, there is an eight-magnitude companion (designated component C), orbiting once every few hundred years. As the third star was previously thought to be relatively massive for its luminosity, it was suspected of being a binary star itself, but the current estimate of component C's magnitude as a single star matches its absolute magnitude.
