= 37 Camelopardalis =

Star in the constellation of Camelopardlis

Observation data Epoch J2000.0 Equinox ICRS
- Constellation: Camelopardalis
- Right ascension: 06^{h} 09^{m} 59.0135^{s}
- Declination: +58° 56′ 08.494″
- Apparent magnitude (V): 5.36±0.01

Characteristics
- Spectral type: G8 III
- U−B color index: +0.92
- B−V color index: +1.10

Astrometry
Radial velocity (R_{v})	30.86±0.12 km/s
Proper motion (μ)	RA: +16.787 mas/yr Dec.: +18.619 mas/yr
Parallax (π)	7.3457±0.0781 mas
Distance	444 ± 5 ly (136 ± 1 pc)
Absolute magnitude (M_{V})	+0.02

Details
Mass	1.43 M_{☉}
Radius	19.25 R_{☉}
Luminosity	129 L_{☉}
Surface gravity (log g)	2.01±0.15 cgs
Temperature	4,609 K
Metallicity [Fe/H]	−0.50±0.07 dex
Rotational velocity (v sin i)	1.5±1.2 km/s
Age	3.5 Gyr

Other designations
- 37 Cam, AG+58°528, BD+58°897, GC 7796, HD 41597, HIP 29246, HR 2152, SAO 25597

Database references
SIMBAD	data

37 Camelopardalis is a solitary star in the northern circumpolar constellation Camelopardalis. It has an apparent magnitude of 5.36, allowing it to be seen with the naked eye under ideal conditions. Located about 444 light years away, the star is receding with a heliocentric radial velocity of 30.86 km/s.

37 Camelopardalis has a stellar classification of G8 III, indicating that the object is an ageing yellow giant. It has an angular diameter of 1.36±0.02 mas, with an actual size of 19.3 R_{☉}. At present it has 1.43 times the mass of the Sun and shines at 129 times the luminosity of the Sun from its photosphere at an effective temperature of 4,609 K, giving it a yellow orange glow. 37 Cam is a metal poor star with an iron abundance only 32% that of the Sun and spins modestly with a projected rotational velocity of 1.5 km/s.
