= 15 Camelopardalis =

Star in the constellation Camelopardalis

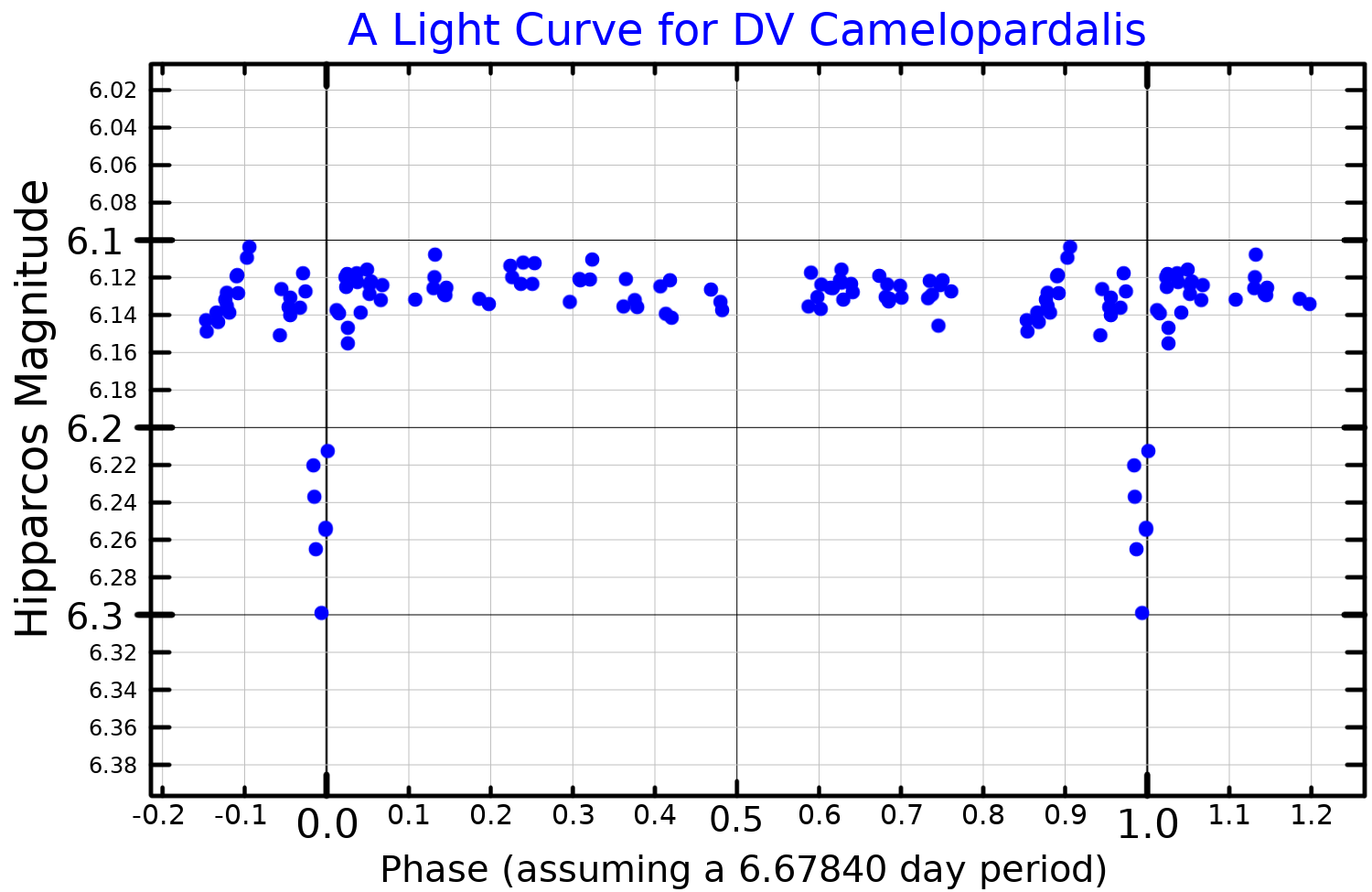
- A Hipparcos light curve for DV Camelopardalis, adapted from Bakiş et al. (2011)

Observation data Epoch J2000.0 Equinox ICRS
- Constellation: Camelopardalis
- Right ascension: 05^{h} 19^{m} 27.85939^{s}
- Declination: +58° 07′ 02.5156″
- Apparent magnitude (V): 6.13

Characteristics
- Evolutionary stage: main sequence
- Spectral type: B5 V
- B−V color index: −0.031±0.005
- Variable type: Algol, SPB

Astrometry
Radial velocity (R_{v})	6.7±3.7 km/s
Proper motion (μ)	RA: +5.854 mas/yr Dec.: −18.517 mas/yr
Parallax (π)	3.1987±0.0683 mas
Distance	1,020 ± 20 ly (313 ± 7 pc)
Absolute magnitude (M_{V})	−0.74

Orbit
Period (P)	6.6784±0.0010 d
Eccentricity (e)	~0.48

Details
Luminosity	220.01 L_{☉}

Other designations
- 15 Cam, DV Cam, BD+57°874, HD 34233, HIP 24836, HR 1719, SAO 25125

Database references
SIMBAD	data

15 Camelopardalis is a triple star system in the northern circumpolar constellation of Camelopardalis. It has the variable star designation DV Camelopardalis; 15 Camelopardalis is the Flamsteed designation. This is just visible to the naked eye as a dim, blue-white hued star with a baseline apparent visual magnitude of 6.13. It is a probable (99%) member of the Cas-Tau OB association.

This system includes a double-lined spectroscopic binary with an orbital period of 6.7 days and a large eccentricity of around 0.48, plus a third component in a wider orbit. The close pair consist of a very slowly rotating helium-weak star plus an ordinary mid-B-type star with a more rapid rotation rate. When the Hipparcos data was analyzed, it was discovered that together they form an Algol-type eclipsing binary with a depth of about 0.2 magnitude. The third component is a slowly pulsating B-type star.
