= 26 Camelopardalis =

A-type main sequence star in the constellation Camelopardalis

Observation data Epoch J2000 Equinox J2000
- Constellation: Camelopardalis
- Right ascension: 05^{h} 46^{m} 30.39025^{s}
- Declination: +56° 06′ 56.0726″
- Apparent magnitude (V): +5.93

Characteristics
- Evolutionary stage: main sequence
- Spectral type: A4Vn
- B−V color index: +0.164±0.004

Astrometry
Radial velocity (R_{v})	+21.0±4.3 km/s
Proper motion (μ)	RA: +19.337±0.133 mas/yr Dec.: −58.838±0.134 mas/yr
Parallax (π)	16.5077±0.0696 mas
Distance	197.6 ± 0.8 ly (60.6 ± 0.3 pc)
Absolute magnitude (M_{V})	2.01

Details
Mass	1.80±0.02 M_{☉}
Luminosity	12.88+0.75 −0.71 L_{☉}
Surface gravity (log g)	4.12 cgs
Temperature	7,798±36 K
Metallicity [Fe/H]	−0.08 dex
Rotational velocity (v sin i)	249 km/s
Age	345 Myr

Other designations
- NSV 2615, BD+56°1058, GC 7191, HD 38091, HIP 27249, HR 1969, SAO 25362

Database references
SIMBAD	data

26 Camelopardalis is a single star in the northern constellation of Camelopardalis, positioned next to the southern constellation boundary with Auriga. It is a suspected variable star that is dimly visible to the naked eye with a peak apparent visual magnitude of +5.93. This object is located at a distance of 197 light years from the Sun based on parallax, and is drifting further away with a radial velocity of +21 km/s.

This is a white-hued A-type main-sequence star with a stellar classification of A4Vn, where the 'n' notation indicates "nebulous" absorption lines due to rapid rotation. It is an estimated 345 million years old and is spinning with a projected rotational velocity of 249 km/s. The star has 1.80 times the mass of the Sun and is radiating 13 times the Sun's luminosity from its photosphere at an effective temperature of 7,798 K.
