= 7 Camelopardalis =

Multiple star system in the constellation Camelopardalis

- Location of 7 Camelopardalis (circled in red)

Observation data Epoch J2000.0 Equinox ICRS
- Constellation: Camelopardalis
- Right ascension: 04^{h} 57^{m} 17.19609^{s}
- Declination: +53° 45′ 07.5654″
- Apparent magnitude (V): 4.43 (4.49 + ? + 7.90 + 11.30)

Characteristics
- Evolutionary stage: main sequence
- Spectral type: A1 V
- B−V color index: −0.017±0.003

Astrometry
Radial velocity (R_{v})	−9.5±3.7 km/s
Proper motion (μ)	RA: −24.51 mas/yr Dec.: +7.71 mas/yr
Parallax (π)	8.77±0.60 mas
Distance	370 ± 30 ly (114 ± 8 pc)
Absolute magnitude (M_{V})	−0.84

Orbit
Primary	7 Cam Aa
Name	7 Cam Ab
Period (P)	3.884 d
Eccentricity (e)	0
Periastron epoch (T)	2,457,726.05 JD
Argument of periastron (ω) (secondary)	0°
Semi-amplitude (K_{1}) (primary)	34.9±0.2 km/s

Details

7 Cam Aa
Mass	3.16±0.10 M_{☉}
Luminosity	221.6+36.8 −31.5 L_{☉}
Temperature	9,226+236 −231 K
Rotational velocity (v sin i)	40 km/s

Other designations
- 7 Cam, BD+53°829, GC 6017, HD 31278, HIP 23040, HR 1568, SAO 24929, ADS 3536, WDS J04573+5345

Database references
SIMBAD	data

7 Camelopardalis is a multiple star system in the northern circumpolar constellation of Camelopardalis. It is located approximately 370 light years from the Sun, as determined from its parallax. This system is visible to the naked eye as a faint, white-hued star with a combined apparent visual magnitude of 4.43. It is moving closer to the Earth with a heliocentric radial velocity of −10 km/s.

The primary member of the group, designated component A, is a single-lined spectroscopic binary system with a circular orbit and a period of 3.88 days. The visible component of this pair is a magnitude 4.49 A-type main-sequence star with a stellar classification of A1 V. It has 3.2 times the mass of the Sun and is spinning with a projected rotational velocity of 40 km/s. The star is radiating 222 times the Sun's luminosity from its photosphere at an effective temperature of 9,226 K.

The magnitude 7.90 component B has an orbital solution with the Aa/Ab pair, which yields a period of 284 years and an eccentricity of 0.74. However, Drummond (2014) found the data to be discordant and instead determined that they are an optical pair with no physical association. The fourth member, component C, is a magnitude 11.30 star at an angular separation of 25.50″ along a position angle of 242° from the primary, as of 2003. It shares a common proper motion with the primary star.
