= 14 Camelopardalis =

Star in the constellation Camelopardalis

Observation data Epoch J2000.0 Equinox J2000.0
- Constellation: Camelopardalis
- Right ascension: 05^{h} 13^{m} 31.24447^{s}
- Declination: +62° 41′ 28.0806″
- Apparent magnitude (V): 6.49

Characteristics
- Evolutionary stage: main sequence
- Spectral type: A7 Vn
- B−V color index: 0.204±0.006

Astrometry
Radial velocity (R_{v})	−4.0±4.3 km/s
Proper motion (μ)	RA: −36.338 mas/yr Dec.: +1.038 mas/yr
Parallax (π)	11.9698±0.0505 mas
Distance	272 ± 1 ly (83.5 ± 0.4 pc)
Absolute magnitude (M_{V})	2.00

Details
Mass	1.61 M_{☉}
Luminosity	15.1+1.4 −1.3 L_{☉}
Surface gravity (log g)	3.96 cgs
Temperature	7,872±268 K
Rotational velocity (v sin i)	312 km/s
Age	504 Myr

Other designations
- 14 Cam, BD+62°734, HD 33296, HIP 24348, HR 1678, SAO 13413

Database references
SIMBAD	data

14 Camelopardalis is a star in the northern circumpolar constellation of Camelopardalis, located 272 light years away from the Sun as determined by parallax measurements. With an apparent visual magnitude of 6.49, it is a challenge to view with the naked eye even in excellent viewing conditions. The heliocentric radial velocity value is poorly constrained, but it appears to be moving closer to the Earth at the rate of around −4 km/s.

This is a white-hued, A-type main-sequence star with a stellar classification of A7 Vn, where the 'n' notation indicates "nebulous" lines due to rapid rotation. The star is 504 million years old with 1.61 times the mass of the Sun and is spinning with a projected rotational velocity of 312 km/s. It is radiating 15 times the Sun's luminosity from its photosphere at an effective temperature of 7,872 K.
