= 12 Camelopardalis =

Star in the constellation of Camelopardalis

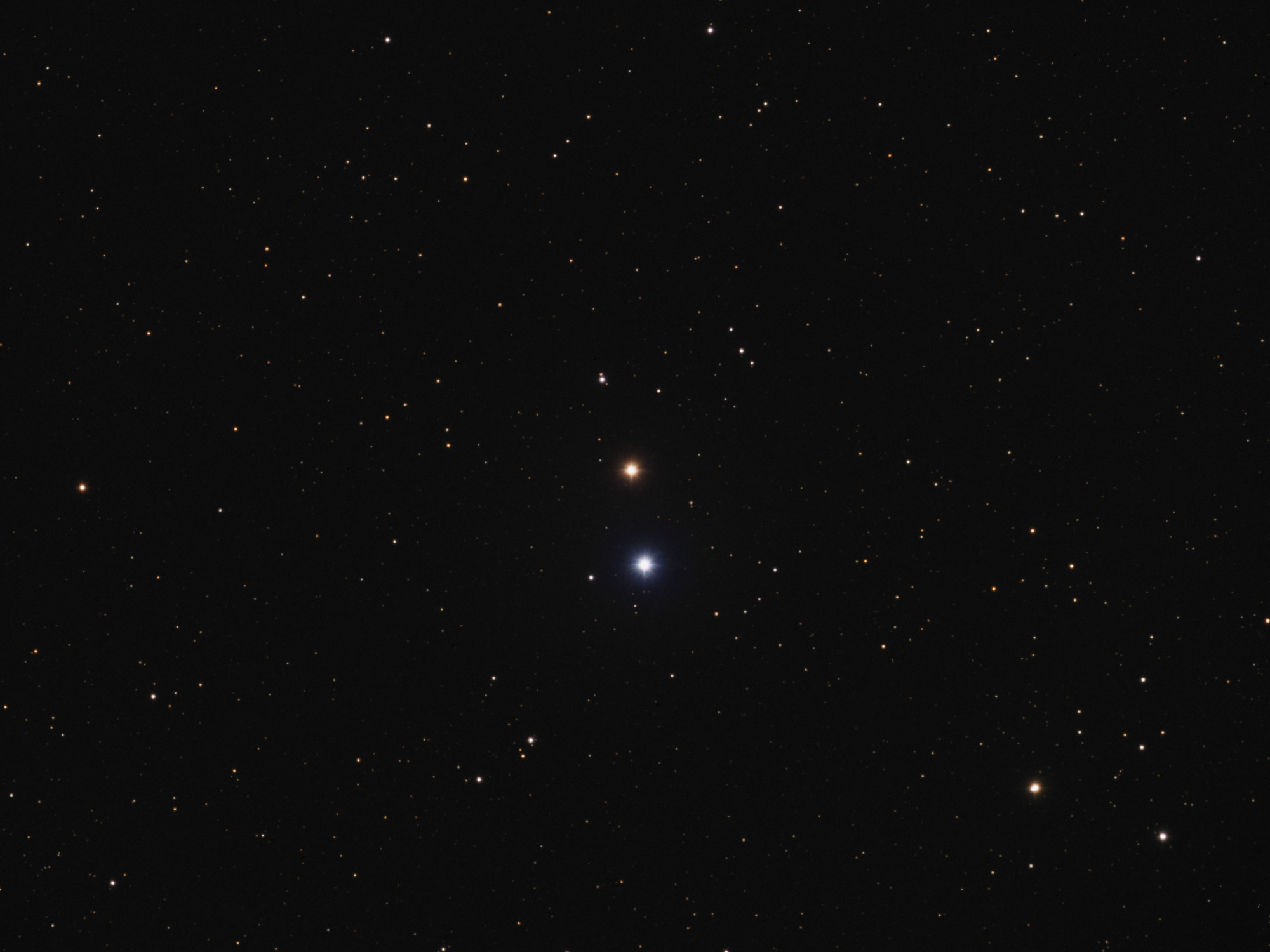
- 12 Camelopardalis (center) in optical light

Observation data Epoch J2000.0 Equinox ICRS
- Constellation: Camelopardalis
- Right ascension: 05^{h} 06^{m} 12.13609^{s}
- Declination: +59° 01′ 16.8261″
- Apparent magnitude (V): 6.08

Characteristics
- Evolutionary stage: giant
- Spectral type: K0 IIIe
- B−V color index: 1.112±0.009
- Variable type: RS CVn

Astrometry
Radial velocity (R_{v})	−1.92±0.27 km/s
Proper motion (μ)	RA: −2.264 mas/yr Dec.: −26.949 mas/yr
Parallax (π)	4.6513±0.0706 mas
Distance	700 ± 10 ly (215 ± 3 pc)
Absolute magnitude (M_{V})	−0.332

Details

12 Cam A
Mass	1.1 M_{☉}
Radius	23.08+0.75 −1.34 R_{☉}
Luminosity	212±4 L_{☉}

12 Cam B
Mass	0.6 M_{☉}

Other designations
- 12 Cam, BM Cam, BD+58°805, HD 32357, HIP 23743, HR 1623, SAO 25003, CCDM 05062+5900, WDS J05061+5858B

Database references
SIMBAD	data

12 Camelopardalis is a binary star in the northern circumpolar constellation of Camelopardalis, located 700 light years away from the Sun as determined from parallax measurements. It forms a double star with 11 Camelopardalis, which is only 3 arcminutes away. The system has the variable star designation BM Camelopardalis; 12 Camelopardalis is the Flamsteed designation. It is just visible to the naked eye, appearing as a dim, orange-hued star with an apparent visual magnitude of 6.08. The system is moving closer to the Earth with a heliocentric radial velocity of −2 km/s.

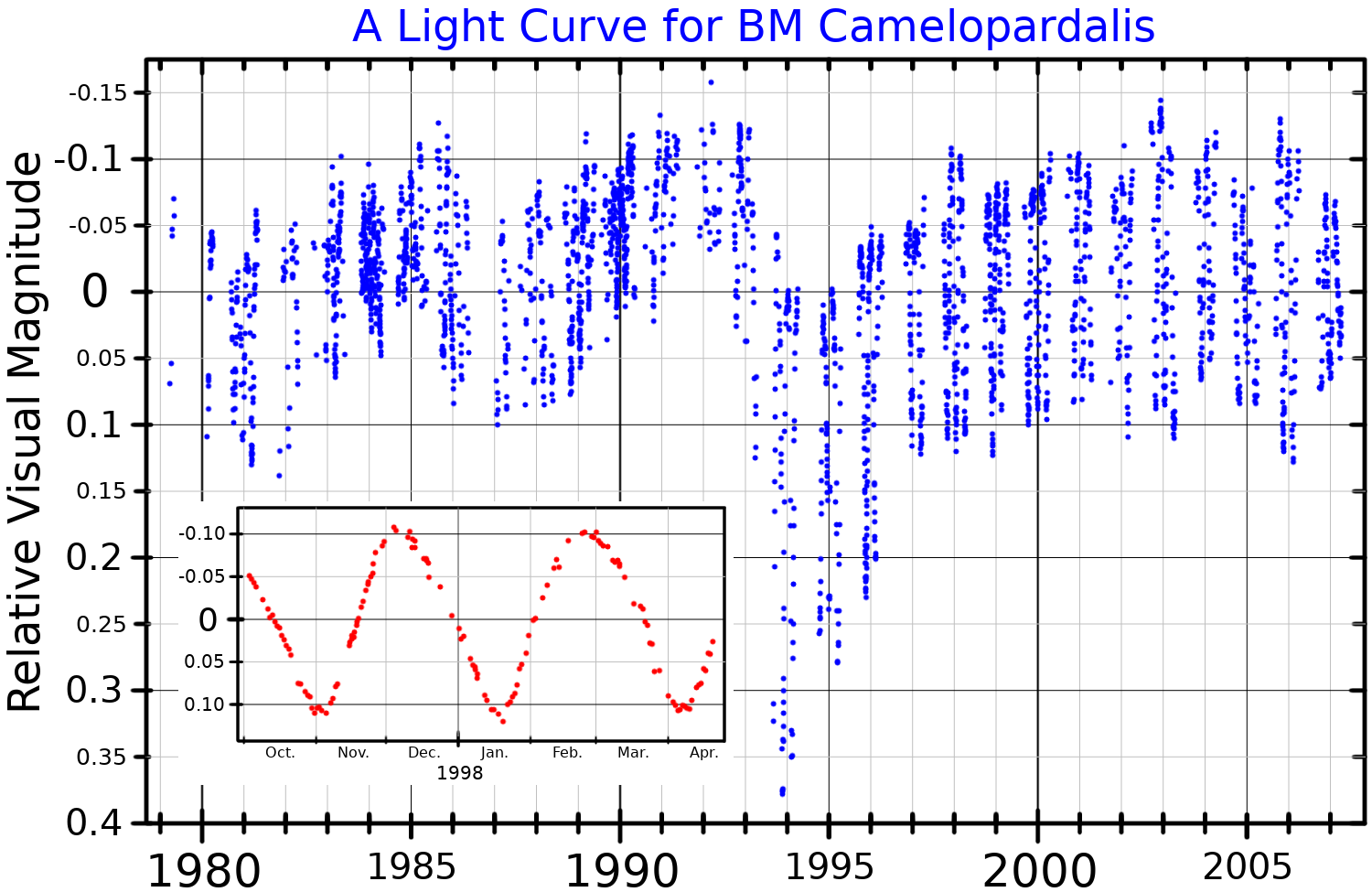
A visual band light curve for BM Camelopardalis, adapted from Zboril and Messina (2009). The main plot shows the long-term variability, and the inset plot shows the variability due to the star's rotation.

Abt et al. (1969) determined this to be a single-lined spectroscopic binary system and computed an orbital solution with a period of 80.17 days and an eccentricity of 0.35. However, what appeared to be an ellipticity effect with a period of 79.93±0.05 d was found, which was inconsistent with the computed orbit, and the lack of modulation of the amplitude did not fit with the large orbital eccentricity. Hall et al. (1995) made additional measurements, finding an orbital period of 80.9 days and an eccentricity that is statistically indistinguishable from zero.

The visible component is an evolved giant star with a stellar classification of K0 IIIe, showing strong emission lines. Joel A. Eaton et al. discovered that the star's brightness varies, in 1980. It was given its variable star designation in 1981. It is an RS Canum Venaticorum variable and its brightness varies by 0.14 magnitudes with a period of 82.9 days due to starspots. The star is most likely rotating in synchronous manner with its orbital period. The magnetic activity has two overlapping cycles of 14.8 and 8.5 years, with the activity occurring at two latitudes. BM Cam emits X-rays and is the designated X-ray source 1H 0501+592. It has been detected by HEAO 1, the Einstein Observatory, and ROSAT.
