= 31 Camelopardalis =

Binary star system in the constellation Camelopardalis

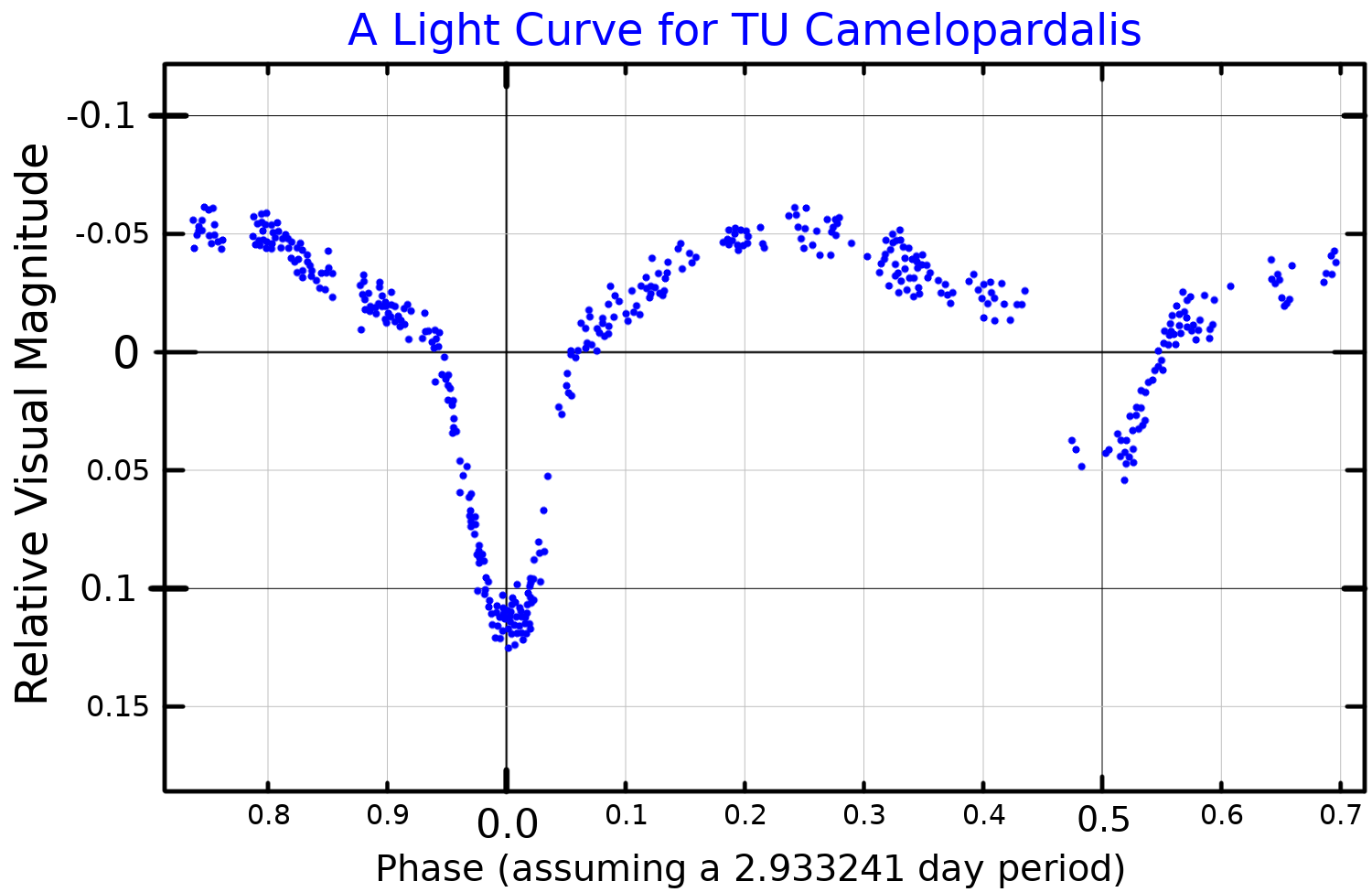
- A visual band light curve for TU Camelopardalis, adapted from West (1968)

Observation data Epoch J2000 Equinox ICRS
- Constellation: Camelopardalis
- Right ascension: 05^{h} 54^{m} 57.82481^{s}
- Declination: +59° 53′ 18.1314″
- Apparent magnitude (V): 5.20

Characteristics
- Spectral type: A2V (A0IV + F0)
- U−B color index: +0.03
- B−V color index: +0.010
- Variable type: β Lyr

Astrometry
Radial velocity (R_{v})	−2.9±0.9 km/s
Proper motion (μ)	RA: +1.488 mas/yr Dec.: −17.928 mas/yr
Parallax (π)	7.1562±0.2336 mas
Distance	460 ± 10 ly (140 ± 5 pc)

Orbit
Period (P)	2.9333 d
Eccentricity (e)	0.00
Longitude of the node (Ω)	0.00°
Periastron epoch (T)	2,423,443.05±10.00 JD
Semi-amplitude (K_{1}) (primary)	78.0 km/s

Details

31 Cam A
Mass	3.03±0.08 M_{☉}
Luminosity	179.8+31.7 −26.9 L_{☉}
Temperature	9,183+149 −147 K
Rotational velocity (v sin i)	75 km/s

Other designations
- 31 Cam, TU Cam, BD+59°920, FK5 2446, GC 7402, HD 214993, HIP 27971, HR 2027, SAO 25447

Database references
SIMBAD	data

31 Camelopardalis is a binary star system in the northern circumpolar constellation of Camelopardalis. It is visible to the naked eye as a dim point of light with a peak apparent visual magnitude of +5.12. Parallax measurements provide a distance estimate of approximately 460 light years away from the Sun, and the system is drifting closer to the Earth with a radial velocity of −3 km/s.

This is a single-lined spectroscopic binary in a circular orbit with an orbital period of 2.93 days. It is a detached binary with two main sequence components that do not fill their Roche lobes.

Joel Stebbins observed the star for more than thirty nights from 1924 through 1927, and discovered that it is a variable star. It was given its variable star designation, TU Cameleopardis, in 1936. The orbital plane is oriented near the line of sight from the Earth, making this a Beta Lyrae–type eclipsing binary variable star. The primary eclipse lowers the visual magnitude to 5.29, while the secondary eclipse lowers it to 5.22.
