= HD 90089 =

Star system in the constellation Camelopardlis

- Location of HD 90089 (circled in red)

Observation data Epoch J2000.0 Equinox ICRS
- Constellation: Camelopardalis
- A
- Right ascension: 10^{h} 31^{m} 04.7079^{s}
- Declination: +82° 33′ 31.146″
- Apparent magnitude (V): 5.252±0.009
- B
- Right ascension: 10^{h} 31^{m} 11.7789^{s}
- Declination: +82° 33′ 32.222″

Characteristics

A
- Evolutionary stage: main sequence
- Spectral type: F4 V kF2 mF2
- U−B color index: −0.05
- B−V color index: +0.37

Astrometry

A
Radial velocity (R_{v})	+7.9±0.9 km/s
Proper motion (μ)	RA: −86.133 mas/yr Dec.: +19.832 mas/yr
Parallax (π)	43.4367±0.5983 mas
Distance	75 ± 1 ly (23.0 ± 0.3 pc)

B
Proper motion (μ)	RA: −105.469 mas/yr Dec.: +37.093 mas/yr
Parallax (π)	44.2131±0.0184 mas
Distance	73.77 ± 0.03 ly (22.618 ± 0.009 pc)

Details

Aa
Mass	1.32 M_{☉}
Radius	1.29 R_{☉}
Luminosity	3.35 L_{☉}
Surface gravity (log g)	4.39 cgs
Temperature	6,831 K

Ab
Mass	0.24 M_{☉}

B
Mass	0.275±0.008 M_{☉}
Radius	0.298±0.008 R_{☉}
Luminosity	0.00807±0.00025 L_{☉}
Surface gravity (log g)	4.90 cgs
Temperature	3,255±108 K

Other designations
- A: BD+83°297, FK5 911, GJ 392.1, HD 90089, HIP 51502, HR 4084, SAO 1714, WDS J10311+8234A

Database references
SIMBAD	A
- B

HD 90089 (HR 4084; Gliese 392.1) is a star system located in the northern circumpolar constellation Camelopardalis. With a combined apparent magnitude of 5.25, it is faintly visible to the naked eye under ideal conditions. This star is located relatively close at a distance of 75 light years, but is drifting away at a rate of almost 8 km/s.

== Characteristics ==
The two innermost components form an astrometric binary system, initially indicated through Gaia astrometry, and validated in 2026 with the direct detection of the secondary component. The observed separation was of 0.024" along a position angle of 182.4°. The main component of HD 90089, component Aa, is an F4 main-sequence star with the calcium K-line and metallic lines of an F2 star. Although the spectral type is of a form that would indicate an Am star, it is not listed in any of the major catalogues of chemically peculiar stars. The secondary, component Ab, is only 0.45 magnitudes fainter than the primary at infrared wavelengths.

An infrared excess has been detected around the inner system, most likely indicating the presence of a circumstellar disk at a radius of 145 AU. The temperature of this dust is 30 K.

In addition to the inner pair, there is an M0 companion separated by 14.1" from the inner pair. It was confirmed to be a physical companion in 2018, and is named component B.
