= VZ Camelopardalis =

Single variable star in the constellation Camelopardalis

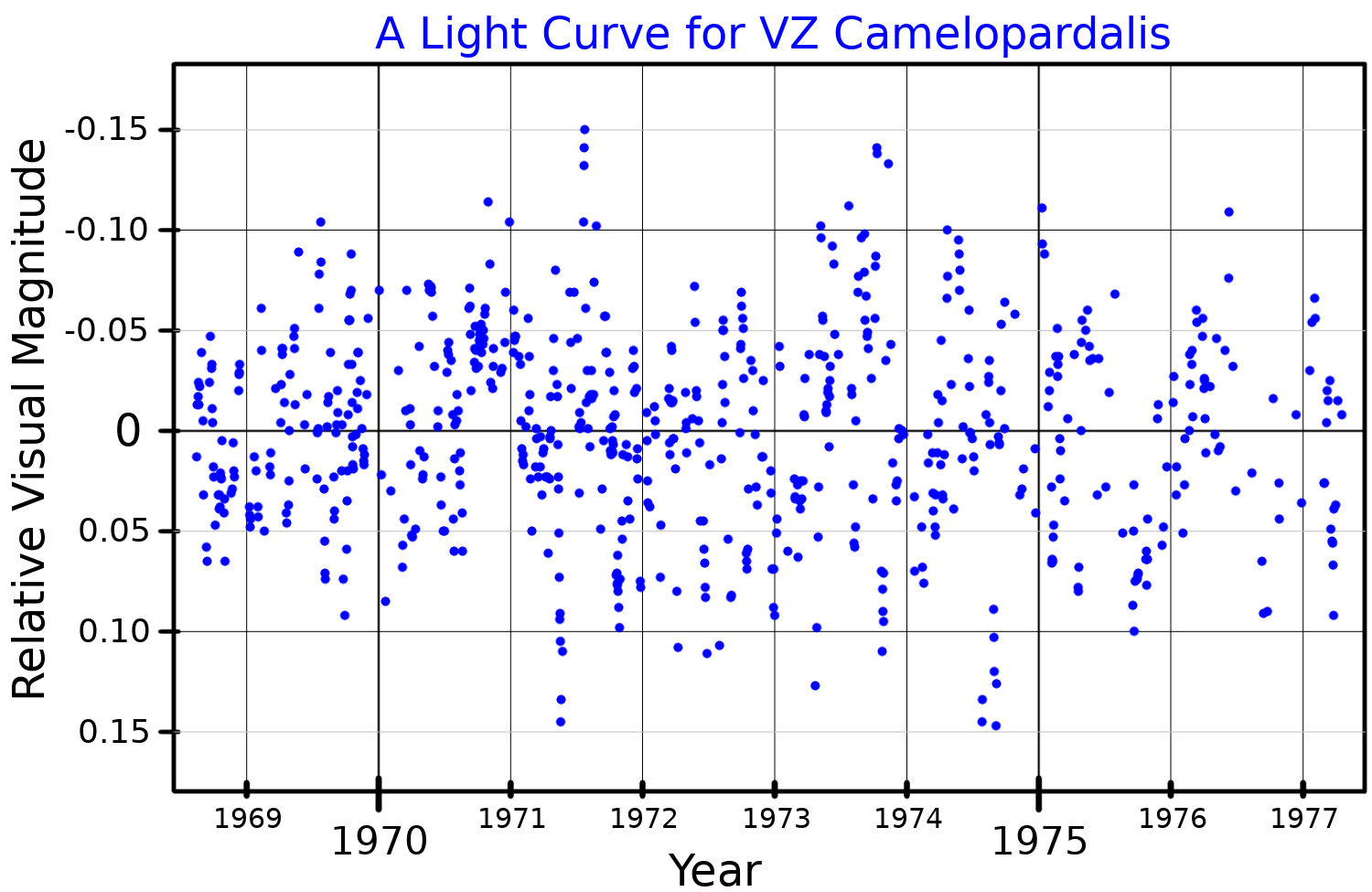
- A visual band light curve for VZ Camelopardalis, plotted from data presented by Tabur et al. (2009)

Observation data Epoch J2000 Equinox J2000
- Constellation: Camelopardalis
- Right ascension: 07^{h} 31^{m} 04.48017^{s}
- Declination: +82° 24′ 41.2905″
- Apparent magnitude (V): 4.92

Characteristics
- Evolutionary stage: AGB
- Spectral type: M4IIIa
- B−V color index: +1.633±0.018
- Variable type: Lb?

Astrometry
| Radial velocity (R_{v}) | +11.90±0.22 km/s |
| Proper motion (μ) | RA: −5.249 mas/yr Dec.: −42.174 mas/yr |
| Parallax (π) | 6.4908±0.2204 mas |
| Distance | 500 ± 20 ly (154 ± 5 pc) |
| Absolute magnitude (M_{V}) | −1.00 |

Details
| Radius | 88.93+7.92 −15.25 R_{☉} |
| Luminosity | 1252±48 L_{☉} |
| Temperature | 3,641+359 −152 K |

Other designations
- VZ Cam, BD+82°201, FK5 3951, GC 9851, HD 55966, HIP 36547, HR 2742, SAO 1179

Database references
| SIMBAD | data |

VZ Camelopardalis is a single, variable star in the northern circumpolar constellation of Camelopardalis. It has a reddish hue and is faintly visible to the naked eye with an apparent visual magnitude that fluctuates around 4.92. The star is located at a distance of approximately 500 light years from the Sun based on parallax, and is drifting further away with a radial velocity of +12 km/s. It was considered a member of the Hyades Supercluster, but in 1990 this was brought into question.

This object is an aging red giant star on the asymptotic giant branch with a stellar classification of M4IIIa. Its variable nature was discovered by American astronomer J. Ashbrook in 1948. This is a suspected slow irregular variable of sub-type Lb that varies in visual magnitude from 4.80 down to 4.96. Long-term photometry measurements suggest there are at least seven pulsation periods ranging from 27.1 to 249.4 days. With the supply of hydrogen at its core exhausted the star has cooled and expanded until it has now reached 89 times the radius of the Sun. It is radiating 1,252 times the luminosity of the Sun from its photosphere at an effective temperature of 3,641 K.
