= HD 89571 =

Binary star in the constellation Camelopardalis

Observation data Epoch J2000.0 Equinox ICRS
- Constellation: Camelopardalis
- Right ascension: 10^{h} 29^{m} 41.6297^{s}
- Declination: +84° 15′ 06.949″
- Apparent magnitude (V): 5.51±0.01

Characteristics
- Spectral type: A9 V
- U−B color index: +0.06
- B−V color index: +0.23

Astrometry
Radial velocity (R_{v})	3.5±2 km/s
Proper motion (μ)	RA: −145.145 mas/yr Dec.: −21.494 mas/yr
Parallax (π)	23.0490±0.3729 mas
Distance	142 ± 2 ly (43.4 ± 0.7 pc)
Absolute magnitude (M_{V})	+2.48

Orbit
Primary	A
Name	B
Period (P)	2.20±0.03 yr
Semi-major axis (a)	0.0142±0.0006″
Eccentricity (e)	0.26±0.11

Details

A
Mass	1.69 M_{☉}
Radius	1.79 R_{☉}
Luminosity	8.4 L_{☉}
Surface gravity (log g)	4.27 cgs
Temperature	7,535 K
Metallicity [Fe/H]	+0.04 dex
Rotational velocity (v sin i)	134±7 km/s
Age	710 Myr

B
Mass	0.38 M_{☉}

Other designations
- AG+84°229, BD+84°234, GC 14305, HD 89571, HIP 51384, HR 4062, SAO 1701, WDS J10297+8415AB

Database references
SIMBAD	data

HD 89571 (HR 4062) is a binary star located in the northern circumpolar constellation Camelopardalis. It is faintly visible to the naked eye with a combined apparent magnitude of 5.51 and is estimated to be 142 light years away from the Solar System. However, it is receding with a heliocentric radial velocity of 3.5 km/s.

The primary has a stellar classification of A9 V, indicating that it is an ordinary A-type main-sequence star. David S. Evans gave it a slightly warmer class of A6 V while Cowley et al. classified it as F0 IV, indicating a F-type subgiant. Nevertheless, the two components take roughly 2 years to orbit each other at a mean separation of 14.2 mas.

The components have masses of 1.69 M_{☉} and 0.38 M_{☉}, with the latter being a probable M-type star. HD 89571 has a radius of 1.79 R_{☉} and a luminosity of 8.4 L_{☉}. This yields an effective temperature of 7,535 K, giving a white hue. It is estimated to be 710 million years old and spins rapidly with a projected rotational velocity of 134 km/s; it has a near solar metallicity, equating to an iron abundance 110% that of the Sun.
