= 11 Camelopardalis =

Star in the constellation Camelopardalis

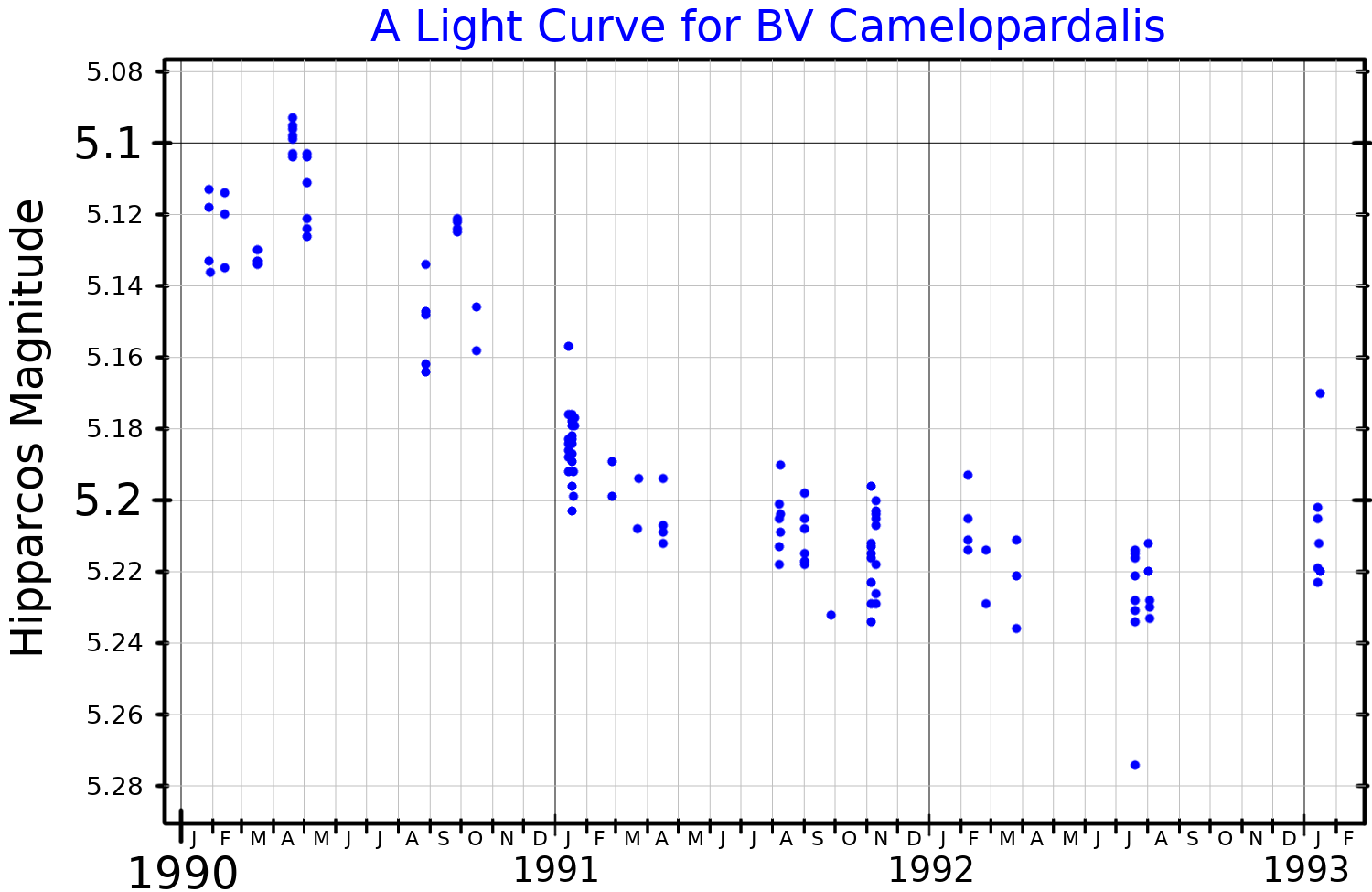
- A light curve for BV Camelopardalis, plotted from Hipparcos data

Observation data Epoch J2000.0 Equinox ICRS
- Constellation: Camelopardalis
- Right ascension: 05^{h} 06^{m} 08.45273^{s}
- Declination: +58° 58′ 20.5432″
- Apparent magnitude (V): 5.08

Characteristics
- Spectral type: B3 Ve
- B−V color index: −0.080
- Variable type: Be

Astrometry
Proper motion (μ)	RA: −6.264 mas/yr Dec.: −7.118 mas/yr
Parallax (π)	4.7543±0.1224 mas
Distance	690 ± 20 ly (210 ± 5 pc)
Absolute magnitude (M_{V})	−1.38

Details
Mass	6.0±1.2 M_{☉}
Radius	7.87 R_{☉}
Luminosity	1,766+131 −122 L_{☉}
Surface gravity (log g)	4.00±0.35 cgs
Temperature	17,240±560 K
Rotational velocity (v sin i)	95±6 km/s
Age	25±3 Myr

Other designations
- 11 Cam, BV Cam, BD+58°804, GC 6193, HD 32343, HIP 23734, HR 1622, SAO 25001, CCDM 05062+5900, WDS J05061+5858A

Database references
SIMBAD	data

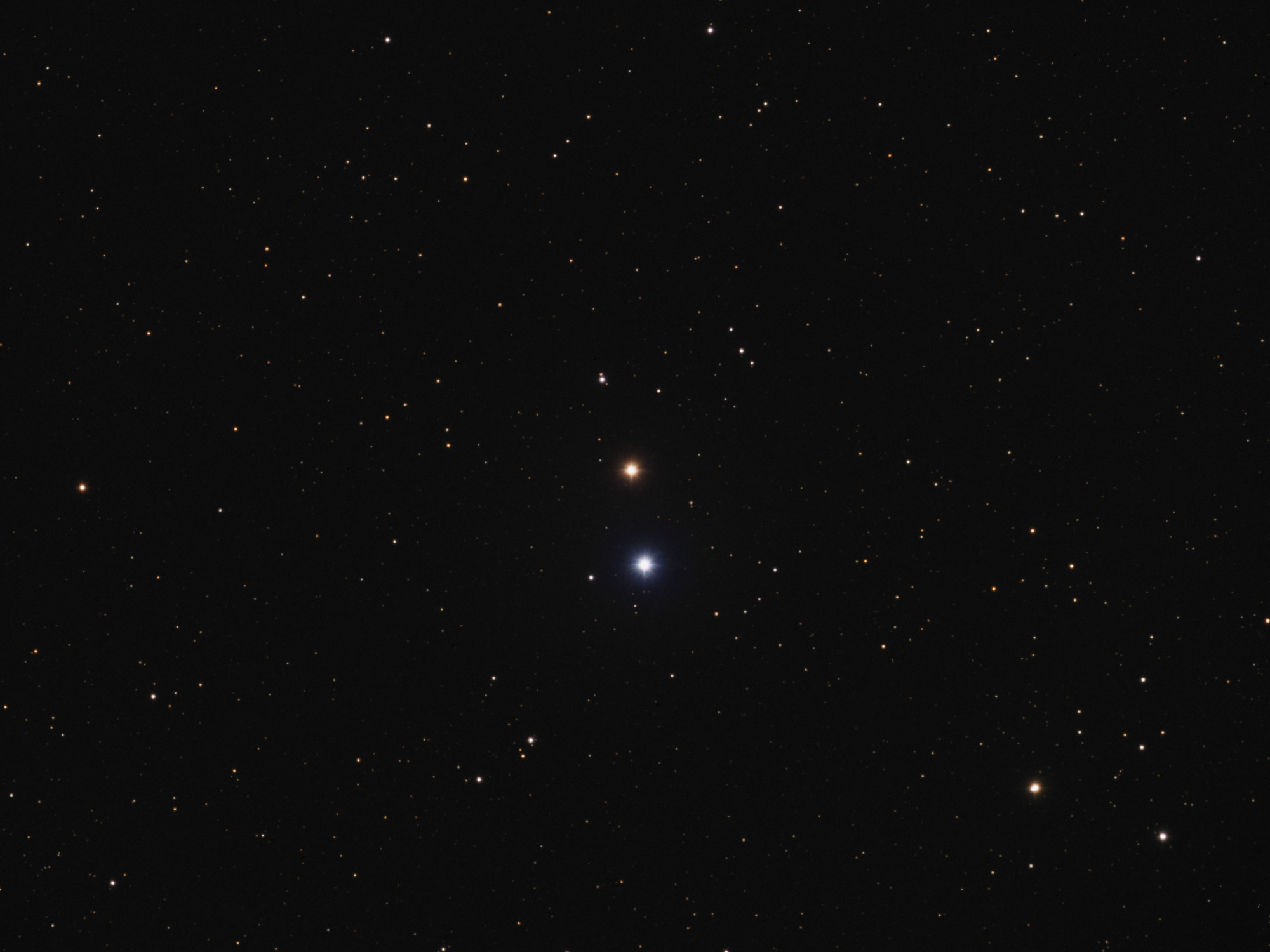
11 Camelopardalis and its reddish companion 12 Camelopardalis

11 Camelopardalis is a single star in the northern circumpolar constellation of Camelopardalis, located around 690 light years away from the Sun as determined by parallax. It has the variable star designation BV Camelopardalis; 11 Camelopardalis is the Flamsteed designation. This object is visible to the naked eye as a faint, blue-white hued star with a baseline apparent visual magnitude of +5.22. It forms a double star with 12 Camelopardalis, which is only 3 arcminutes away.

This is a main sequence Be star with a stellar classification of B3 Ve. John R. Percy et al. discovered that 11 Camelopardalis is a variable star in 1979, and published that finding in 1981. It was given its variable star designation in 1987. Samus et al. (2017) classify it as a Be variable, rather than a Gamma Cassiopeiae type, and it ranges from a peak Hipparcos magnitude of 5.10 down to 5.22. The star is spinning with a projected rotational velocity of 95 km/s, but is being viewed from an extreme pole-on position. Hence it is spinning much more rapidly than indicated. Outbursts of hydrogen emission lines have been observed, as well as rapid changes in hydrogen line profiles. It is 25 million years old with around six times the mass of the Sun.
