= Ziwei enclosure =

Chinese historical constellation

The Purple Forbidden enclosure (紫微垣 Zǐ wēi yuán) is one of the San Yuan (三垣 Sān yuán) or Three Enclosures. Stars and constellations of this group lie near the north celestial pole and are visible all year from temperate latitudes in the Northern Hemisphere.

== Asterisms ==
The asterisms are:

English name	Chinese name	Number of stars	Western Constellation	Additional notes	Representing
Northern Pole	北極	5	Ursa Minor / Camelopardalis	Consists of : The Crown Prince (太子) → 1st star; The Emperor (帝) → 2nd star; The Son of Concubine (庶子) → 3rd star; The Concubine (後宮) → 4th star; The Celestial Pivot (天樞) → 5th star	Five Star of North Pole
Four Advisors	四輔	4	Ursa Minor / Camelopardalis		Four assistants of ancient Emperor Chen
Celestial Great One	天乙	1	Draco		One of the three gods of ancient legend
First Great One	太乙	1	Draco		One of the three gods of ancient legend
Left Wall	紫微左垣	8	Draco / Cepheus / Cassiopeia	Consists of : The Left Pivot (左樞) → 1st star; The First Premier (上宰) → 2nd star; The Second Premier (少宰) → 3rd star; The First Minister (上弼) → 4th star; The Second Minister (少弼) → 5th star; The First Imperial Guard (上卫) → 6th star; The Second Imperial Guard (少卫) → 7th star; The Second Prime Minister (少丞) → 8th star	Eight guardian stars in the left
Right Wall	紫微右垣	7	Ursa Major / Draco / Camelopardalis	Consists of : The Right Pivot (右樞) → 1st star; The Second Chief Judge (少尉) → 2nd star; The First Minister (上辅) → 3rd star; The Second Minister (少辅) → 4th star; The First imperial Guard (上卫) → 5th star; The Second Imperial Guard (少卫) → 6th star; The First Prime Minister (上丞) → 7th star	Seven guardian stars in the right
Hidden Virtue	陰德	2	Draco		Hidden matters of the Emperor and prohibited to know
Royal Secretary	尚書	5	Ursa Minor / Draco		The position of the royal
Female Protocol	女史	1	Draco		Female officer for the Queen etiquette
Official of Royal Archives	柱史	1	Draco		Officer which have responsibility to the historical record
Maids-in-waiting	御女	4	Draco		Wives or concubines
Celestial Pillar	天柱	5	Draco / Cepheus		Pillar of the local post decree, also responsible for supporting earth
Chief Judge	大理	2	Camelopardalis		The hearing judge
Curved Array	勾陳	6	Ursa Minor / Cepheus		Curved matters like a hook, in ancient times was regarded as the Yellow Emperor's harem or Princess of Heaven
Six Jia	六甲	6	Camelopardalis / Cepheus		Attribution to match from the six decades
Great Emperor of Heaven	天皇大帝	1	Cepheus		Emperor of Heaven
Interior Seats of the Five Emperors	五帝內座	5	Cepheus / Cassiopeia		Five parties of the emperor of heaven
Canopy of the Emperor	華蓋	7	Cassiopeia		Umbrella shelter used by the emperor
Canopy Support	杠	9	Camelopardalis / Cassiopeia		The handle of canopy
Guest House	傳舍	9	Camelopardalis / Cassiopeia / Cepheus		Welcome ancient premises
Inner Steps	內階	6	Ursa Major		Ladder of Connection to the Purple Palace
Celestial Kitchen	天廚	6	Draco		General officers kitchen
Eight Kinds of Crops	八穀	8	Camelopardalis / Auriga		Eight kind of crops, refer to rice, millet, barley, wheat, soybean, bean, chestnut, hemp, or the land management officials
Celestial Flail	天棓	5	Draco / Hercules		Agricultural device for threshing
Inner Kitchen	內廚	2	Draco		Kitchen designed for the temple
Administrative Center	文昌	6	Ursa Major		Six government departments or officials
Three Top Instructors	三師	3	Ursa Major		
Three Excellencies	三公	3	Canes Venatici		
Celestial Bed	天床	6	Ursa Minor / Draco		Left child of the bed
Royals	太尊	1	Ursa Major		Royal, or the royal ancestor
Celestial Prison	天牢	6	Ursa Major		Aristocratic prison confinement
Guard of the Sun	太陽守	1	Ursa Major		Minister or the general
Eunuch	勢	4	Leo Minor		The eunuchs
Prime Minister	相	1	Canes Venatici		The prime minister
Sombre Lance	玄戈	1	Boötes		A weapon
Judge for Nobility	天理	4	Ursa Major		Imprisonment in prison or magistrate noble
Northern Dipper	北斗	7	Ursa Major	Consists of : The Celestial Pivot (天樞) → 1st star; The Celestial Rotating Jade (天璇) → 2nd star; The Celestial Shining Pearl (天機) → 3rd star; The Celestial Balance (天權) → 4th star; The Jade Sighting-Tube (玉衡) → 5th star; The Opener of Heat (開陽) → 6th star; The Twinkling Brilliance (搖光) → 7th star	The Big Dipper
Assistant	輔	1	Ursa Major		Minister of the North Star (Fǔchú)
Celestial Spear	天槍	3	Boötes		Weapon guard

== See also ==
- Twenty-Eight Mansions
