= Camelopardalis =

Constellation in the northern celestial hemisphere

- Constellation
- List of stars in Camelopardalis
- Abbreviation: Cam
- Genitive: Camelopardalis
- Pronunciation: /kəˌmɛləˈpɑːrdəlɪs/ kə-MEL-ə-PAR-də-lis, genitive the same
- Symbolism: Giraffe
- Right ascension: 03^{h} 15^{m} 36.2232^{s}–14^{h} 27^{m} 07.8855^{s}
- Declination: 86.0975418°–52.6655540°
- Area: 757 sq. deg. (18th)
- Main stars: 2, 8
- Bayer/Flamsteed stars: 36
- Stars brighter than 3.00^{m}: 0
- Stars within 10.00 pc (32.62 ly): 3
- Brightest star: β Cam (4.03^{m})
- Nearest star: Gliese 445
- Messier objects: 0
- Meteor showers: October Camelopardalids
- Bordering constellations: Draco; Ursa Minor; Cepheus; Cassiopeia; Perseus; Auriga; Lynx; Ursa Major
- Visible at latitudes between +90° and −4°. Best visible at 21:00 (9 p.m.) during the month of February.

Camelopardalis is a large but faint constellation of the Northern Sky representing a giraffe. The constellation was introduced in 1612 or 1613 by Petrus Plancius. Some older astronomy books give Camelopardalus or Camelopardus as alternative forms of the name, but the version recognized by the International Astronomical Union matches the genitive form, seen suffixed to most of its brighter stars.

== Etymology ==
First attested in English in 1785, the word camelopardalis comes from Latin, and it is the romanization of the Greek "καμηλοπάρδαλις" meaning "giraffe", from "κάμηλος" (kamēlos), "camel" + "πάρδαλις" (pardalis), "leopard", because it has a long neck like a camel and spots like a leopard.

== History ==
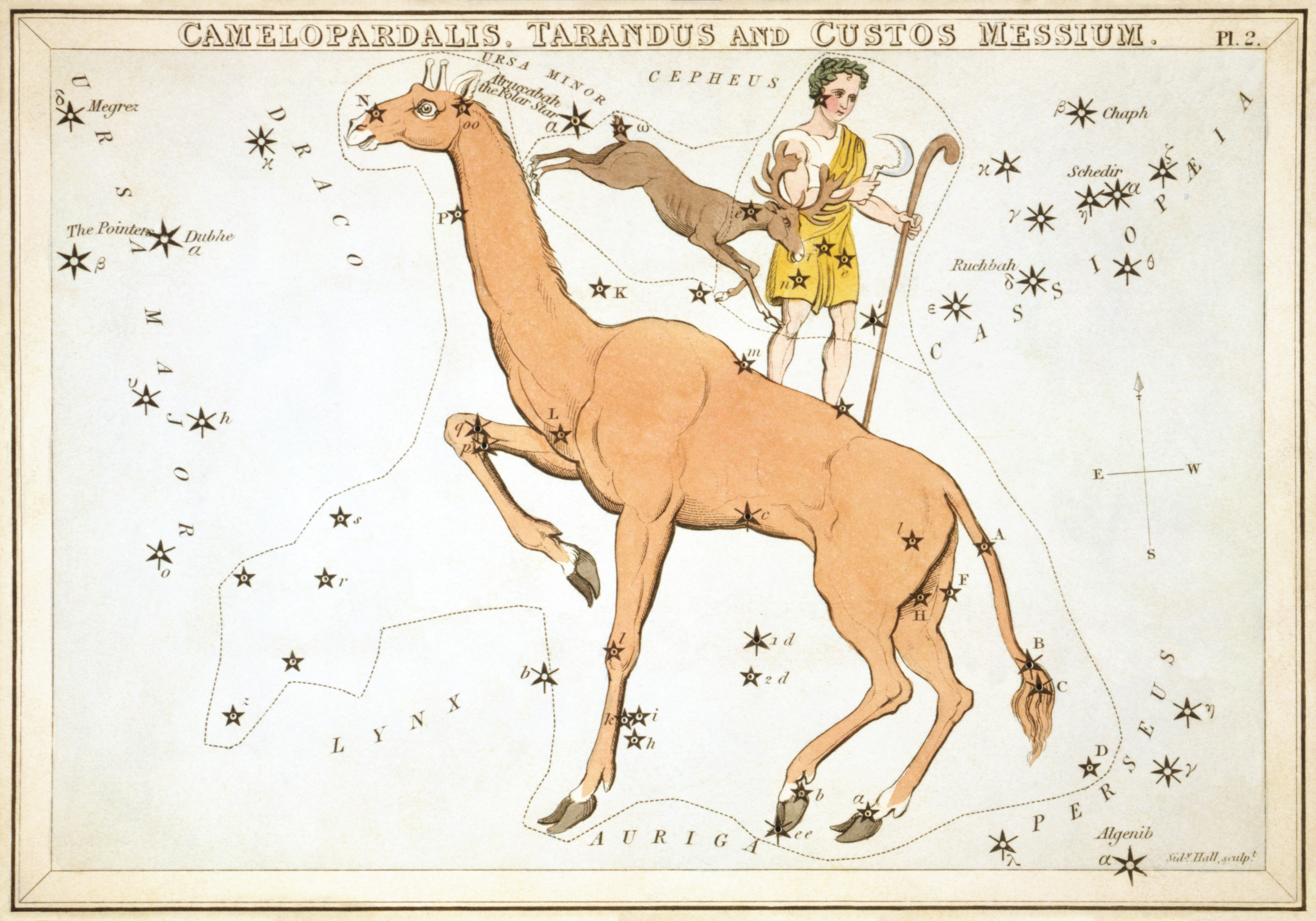
Camelopardalis as depicted in Urania's Mirror, a set of constellation cards published in London c.1823. Above it are shown the now-abandoned constellations of Tarandus and Custos Messium.

Camelopardalis is not one of Ptolemy's 48 constellations in the Almagest. It was created by Petrus Plancius in 1613. It first appeared in a globe designed by him and produced by Pieter van den Keere. One year later, Jakob Bartsch featured it in his atlas. Johannes Hevelius depicted this constellation in his works which were so influential that it was referred to as Camelopardali Hevelii or abbreviated as Camelopard. Hevel.

Part of the constellation was hived off to form the constellation Sciurus Volans, the Flying Squirrel, by William Croswell in 1810. However, this was not taken up by later cartographers.

=== Equivalents ===
In Chinese astronomy, the stars of Camelopardalis are located within a group of circumpolar stars called the Purple Forbidden Enclosure (紫微垣 Zǐ Wēi Yuán).

== Features ==
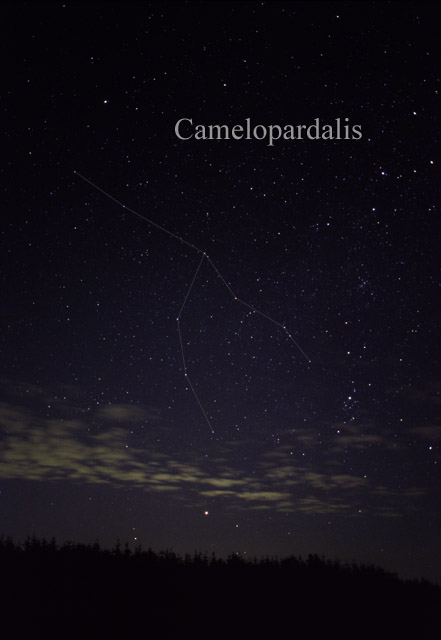
The constellation Camelopardalis as it can be seen by the naked eye.

=== Stars ===
Although Camelopardalis is the 18th largest constellation, it is not particularly prominent, as the brightest stars are only of only fourth magnitude. In fact, it contains only four stars brighter than magnitude 5.0.

- α Cam is a blue-hued supergiant star of magnitude 4.3, over 6,000 light-years from Earth. It is one of the most distant stars easily visible with the naked eye.
- β Cam is the brightest star in Camelopardalis with an apparent magnitude of 4.03. This star is a double star, with components of magnitudes 4.0 and 8.6. The primary is a yellow-hued supergiant 1000 light-years from Earth.
- 11 Cam is a star of magnitude 5.2, 650 light-years from Earth. It appears without intense magnification very close to magnitude 6.1 12 Cam, at about the same distance from us, but the two are not a true double star; they have considerable separation.
- Σ 1694 (Struve 1694, 32H Cam) is a binary star 300 light-years from Earth. Both components have a blue-white hue; the primary is of magnitude 5.4 and the secondary is of magnitude 5.9.
- CS Cam is the second brightest star, though it has neither a Bayer nor a Flamsteed designation. It is of magnitude 4.21 and is slightly variable.
- Z Cam (varying from amateur telescope visibility to extremely faint) is frequently observed as part of a program of AAVSO. It is the prototype of Z Camelopardalis variable stars.

Other variable stars are U Camelopardalis, VZ Camelopardalis, and Mira variables T Camelopardalis, X Camelopardalis, and R Camelopardalis. RU Camelopardalis is one of the brighter Type II Cepheids visible in the night sky.

In 2011 a supernova was discovered in the constellation.

=== Deep-sky objects ===
Camelopardalis is in the part of the celestial sphere facing away from the galactic plane. Accordingly, many distant galaxies are visible within its borders.

- NGC 2403 is a galaxy in the M81 group of galaxies, located approximately 12 million light-years from Earth with a redshift of 0.00043. It is classified as being between an elliptical and a spiral galaxy because it has faint arms and a large central bulge. NGC 2403 was first discovered by the 18th century astronomer William Herschel, who was working in England at the time. It has an integrated magnitude of 8.0 and is approximately 0.25° long.
- NGC 1502 is a magnitude 6.9 open cluster about 3,000 light years from Earth. It has about 45 bright members, and features also a double star of magnitude 7.0 at its center. NGC 1502 is also associated with Kemble's Cascade, a simple but beautiful asterism appearing in the sky as a chain of stars 2.5° long that is parallel to the Milky Way and is pointed towards Cassiopeia.
- NGC 1501 is a planetary nebula located roughly 1.4° south of NGC 1502.

The constellation Camelopardalis showing the IAU boundaries, the constellation stick figure, and labels for its brightest stars. Astrophotograph by Eckhard Slawik, from NOIRLab's 88 Constellations project.

- Stock 23 is an open star cluster at the southern part of the border between Camelopardalis and Cassiopeia. It is also known as Pazmino's Cluster. It could be categorized as an asterism because of the small number of stars in it (a small telescopic constellation).
- IC 342 is one of the brightest two galaxies in the IC 342/Maffei Group of galaxies.
- The dwarf irregular galaxy NGC 1569 is a magnitude 11.9 starburst galaxy, about 11 million light years away.
- NGC 2655 is a large lenticular galaxy with visual magnitude 10.1.
- UGC 3697 is known as the Integral Sign Galaxy (its location is 7:11:4 / +71°50').
- MS0735.6+7421 is a galaxy cluster with a redshift of 0.216, located 2.6 billion light-years from Earth. It is unique for its intracluster medium, which emits X-rays at a very high rate. This galaxy cluster features two cavities 600,000 light-years in diameter, caused by its central supermassive black hole, which emits jets of matter. MS0735.6+7421 is one of the largest and most distant examples of this phenomenon.
- Tombaugh 5 is a fairly dim open cluster in Camelopardalis. It has an overall magnitude of 8.4 and is located 5,800 light-years from Earth. It is a Shapley class c and Trumpler class III 1 r cluster, meaning that it is irregularly shaped and appears loose. Though it is detached from the star field, it is not concentrated at its center at all. It has more than 100 stars which do not vary widely in brightness, mostly being of the 15th and 16th magnitude.
- NGC 2146 is an 11th magnitude barred spiral starburst galaxy conspicuously warped by interaction with a neighbour.
- MACS0647-JD, one of the possible candidates for the farthest known galaxies in the universe (z= 10.7), is also in Camelopardalis.

=== Meteor showers ===
The annual May meteor shower Camelopardalids from comet 209P/LINEAR have a radiant in Camelopardalis.

== See also ==
- Camelopardalis (Chinese astronomy)
- Camelopardalis dark region
