= Delta Boötis =

Double star in the northern constellation Boötes

δ Boötis
- Location of δ Boötis (circled)

Observation data Epoch J2000 Equinox ICRS
- Constellation: Boötes
- A
- Right ascension: 15^{h} 15^{m} 30.16282^{s}
- Declination: +33° 18′ 53.3925″
- Apparent magnitude (V): 3.482
- B
- Right ascension: 15^{h} 15^{m} 38.34898^{s}
- Declination: +33° 19′ 15.3187″
- Apparent magnitude (V): 7.81

Characteristics

A
- Spectral type: G8 III
- U−B color index: +0.656
- B−V color index: +0.951

B
- Spectral type: G0 V
- U−B color index: +0.02
- B−V color index: +0.59

Astrometry

A
Radial velocity (R_{v})	−12.29±0.16 km/s
Proper motion (μ)	RA: +84.383 mas/yr Dec.: −111.591 mas/yr
Parallax (π)	27.0746±0.1256 mas
Distance	120.5 ± 0.6 ly (36.9 ± 0.2 pc)
Absolute magnitude (M_{V})	+0.700

B
Radial velocity (R_{v})	−11.83±0.18 km/s
Proper motion (μ)	RA: +82.918 mas/yr Dec.: −110.075 mas/yr
Parallax (π)	27.1573±0.0178 mas
Distance	120.10 ± 0.08 ly (36.82 ± 0.02 pc)
Absolute magnitude (M_{V})	+4.96

Details

A
Mass	1.5 M_{☉}
Radius	10.93±0.06 R_{☉}
Luminosity	58.1 L_{☉}
Surface gravity (log g)	2.38±0.09 cgs
Temperature	4,810±30 K
Metallicity [Fe/H]	−0.35±0.03 dex
Rotational velocity (v sin i)	3.6 km/s

B
Mass	0.98 M_{☉}
Radius	0.91±0.02 R_{☉}
Luminosity	0.87 L_{☉}
Temperature	5,812±67 K
Age	3.09 Gyr

Other designations
- STF 4027, ADS 9559, WDS 15155+3319
- A: Qigong, δ Boo, 49 Boötis, BD+33 2561, FK5 563, HD 135722, HIP 74666, HR 5681, SAO 64589
- B: BD+33 2562, HIP 74674, SAO 64591

Database references
SIMBAD	A
- B

Delta Boötis, Latinized from δ Boötis formally named Qigong, is a double star in the northern constellation of Boötes, forming the easternmost member of the constellation's kite-shaped asterism of brighter stars. Based upon parallax measurements, it is located at a distance of approximately 120.5 light-years (36.9 parsecs) from the Earth. The apparent visual magnitude of this star is 3.5, making it visible to the naked eye even during a Full Moon. The magnitude 7.81 companion can be viewed in binoculars or a small telescope.

== Nomenclature ==
Delta Boötis is a Bayer designation that is Latinized from δ Boötis, and abbreviated Delta Boo or δ Boo. This star is sometimes called Princeps /ˈprɪnsɛps/, meaning prince or prime in Latin. The origin of this name is unclear, although it usually appears in an astrological context.

In Chinese astronomy, 七公 (Qī Gōng), meaning Seven Excellencies, refers to an asterism consisting of δ Boötis, 42 Herculis, τ Herculis, φ Herculis, χ Herculis, ν^{1} Boötis and μ^{1} Boötis. Consequently, the Chinese name for δ Boötis itself is 七公七 (Qī Gōng qī, English: the Seventh Star of Seven Excellencies). R. H. Allen's Star Names (1899) referred to this asterism as Tseih Kung, "the Seven Princes". The IAU Working Group on Star Names approved the name Qigong for Delta Boötis A on 15 April 2026, after the Chinese constellation.

With β Boötis (Nekkar), γ Boötis (Seginus) and μ Boötis (Alkalurops), this star formed an asterism called in Arabic Al Dhi᾽bah, the female wolves or hyenas; similar names are found in Draco (see Zeta Draconis). Rhoads (1971) listed Thiba as a name for δ Boötis.

== Properties ==
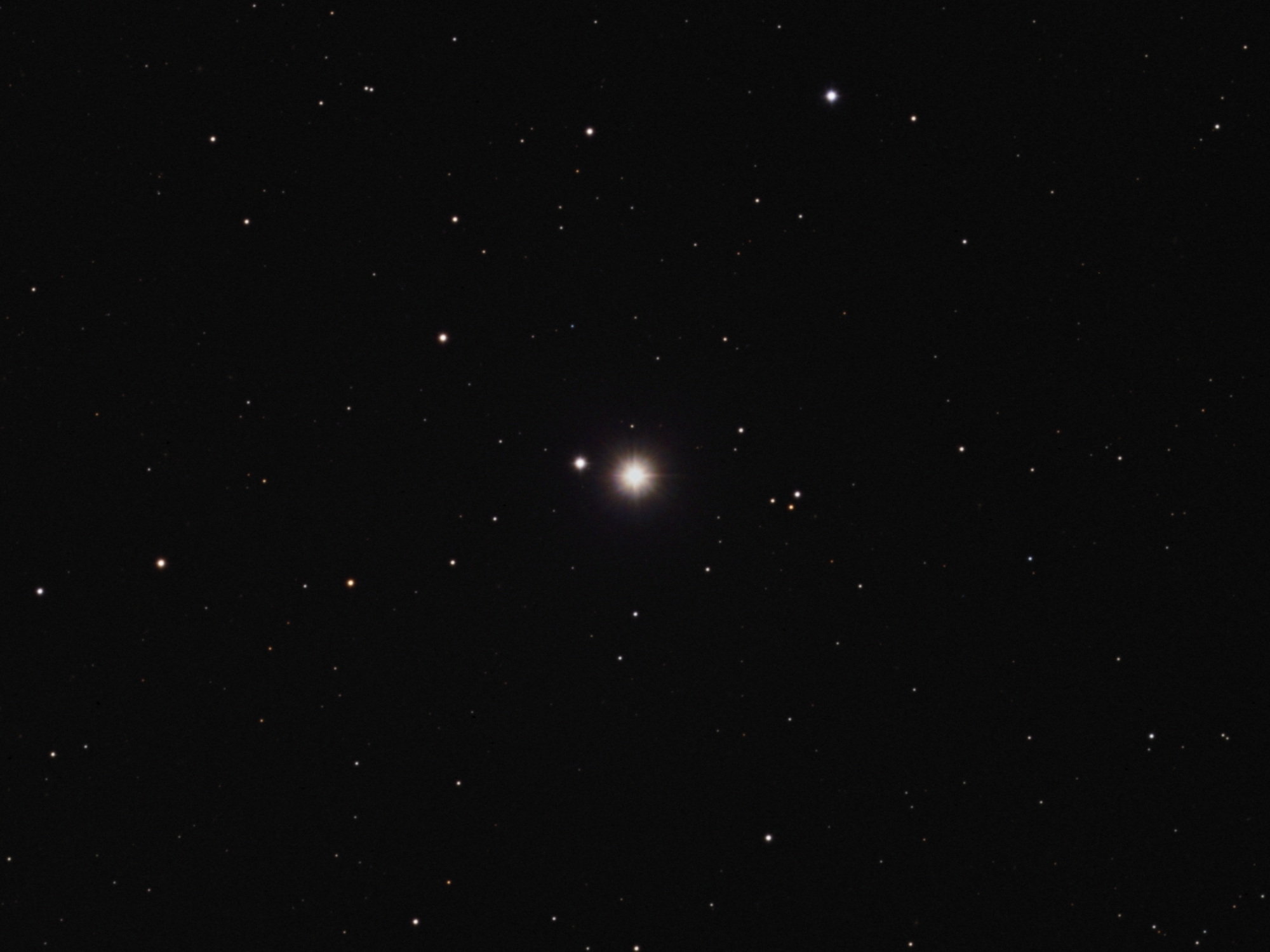
δ Boötis in optical light

This system consists of a pair of stars located in physical proximity to each other and sharing a similar motion through space, suggesting that they may form a binary star system. Based upon their angular separation and their distance, they have a projected separation of 3,800 astronomical units (AU). If they are gravitationally bound to each other, the orbital period of the system would be at least 120,000 years.

The brighter member of the pair has a stellar classification of G8 III, indicating that it has exhausted the supply of hydrogen at its core and evolved into a giant star. It now has a radius more than eleven times the radius of the Sun. Compared to the Sun, this star appears deficient in elements other than hydrogen and helium—what astronomers term the star's metallicity. The outer envelope of this star has an effective temperature of 4,810 K, which is what gives it the characteristic yellow hue of a G-type star.

The secondary component has a stellar classification of G0 V, which suggests it is a main-sequence star that may be similar in physical properties to the Sun. The apparent visual magnitude of this star is 7.81, making it much less luminous than the primary component.
