= Tau Herculis =

Variable star in the constellation Hercules

τ Herculis
- Location of τ Herculis (circled in red)

Observation data Epoch J2000 Equinox ICRS
- Constellation: Hercules
- Right ascension: 16^{h} 19^{m} 44.43666^{s}
- Declination: +46° 18′ 48.1123″
- Apparent magnitude (V): 3.91 3.83 to 3.86

Characteristics
- Evolutionary stage: Main sequence
- Spectral type: B5 IV
- U−B color index: −0.569
- B−V color index: −0.151±0.009
- Variable type: SPB

Astrometry
Radial velocity (R_{v})	−15.5±0.5 km/s
Proper motion (μ)	RA: −13.33 mas/yr Dec.: 38.48 mas/yr
Parallax (π)	10.61±0.11 mas
Distance	307 ± 3 ly (94.3 ± 1.0 pc)
Absolute magnitude (M_{V})	−0.96

Details
Mass	4.01 M_{☉}
Radius	3.55±0.19 R_{☉} 3.80±0.25 R_{☉}
Luminosity	574 L_{☉}
Surface gravity (log g)	4.02±0.05 cgs
Temperature	15,615±301 K
Metallicity [Fe/H]	0.15 dex
Rotational velocity (v sin i)	32 km/s
Age	26 Myr

Other designations
- Asuusiha, τ Her, 22 Her, BD+46°2169, FK5 608, GC 21987, HD 147394, HIP 79992, HR 6092, SAO 46028, CCDM J16197+4619A

Database references
SIMBAD	data

Tau Herculis, also named Asuusiha (Manchu: ᠠᠰᡠ ᡠᠰᡳᡥᠠ, Möllendorff: asu usiha), is a variable star in the northern constellation of Hercules. It has a blue-white hue and is visible to the naked eye at night with an apparent visual magnitude that fluctuates around 3.91. The star is located at a distance of approximately 307 light-years from the Sun based on parallax, but it is drifting closer with a radial velocity of −16 km/s.

== Nomenclature ==
Tau Herculis, Latinized from τ Herculis and abbreviated Tau Her or τ Her, is the star's Bayer designation.

In Chinese astronomy, 七公 (Qī Gōng), meaning Seven Excellencies, refers to an asterism consisting of τ Herculis, 42 Herculis, φ Herculis, χ Herculis, ν^{1} Boötis, μ^{1} Boötis and δ Boötis. Consequently, the Chinese name for τ Herculis itself is 七公二 (Qī Gōng èr, English: the Second Star of Seven Excellencies). This star is also part of the Manchu constellation Asu Usiha (Manchu: ᠠᠰᡠ ᡠᠰᡳᡥᠠ, Möllendorff: asu usiha), representing a net used to hunt sables. The IAU Working Group on Star Names adopted the name Asuusiha for τ Herculis on 14 May 2026.

== Properties ==
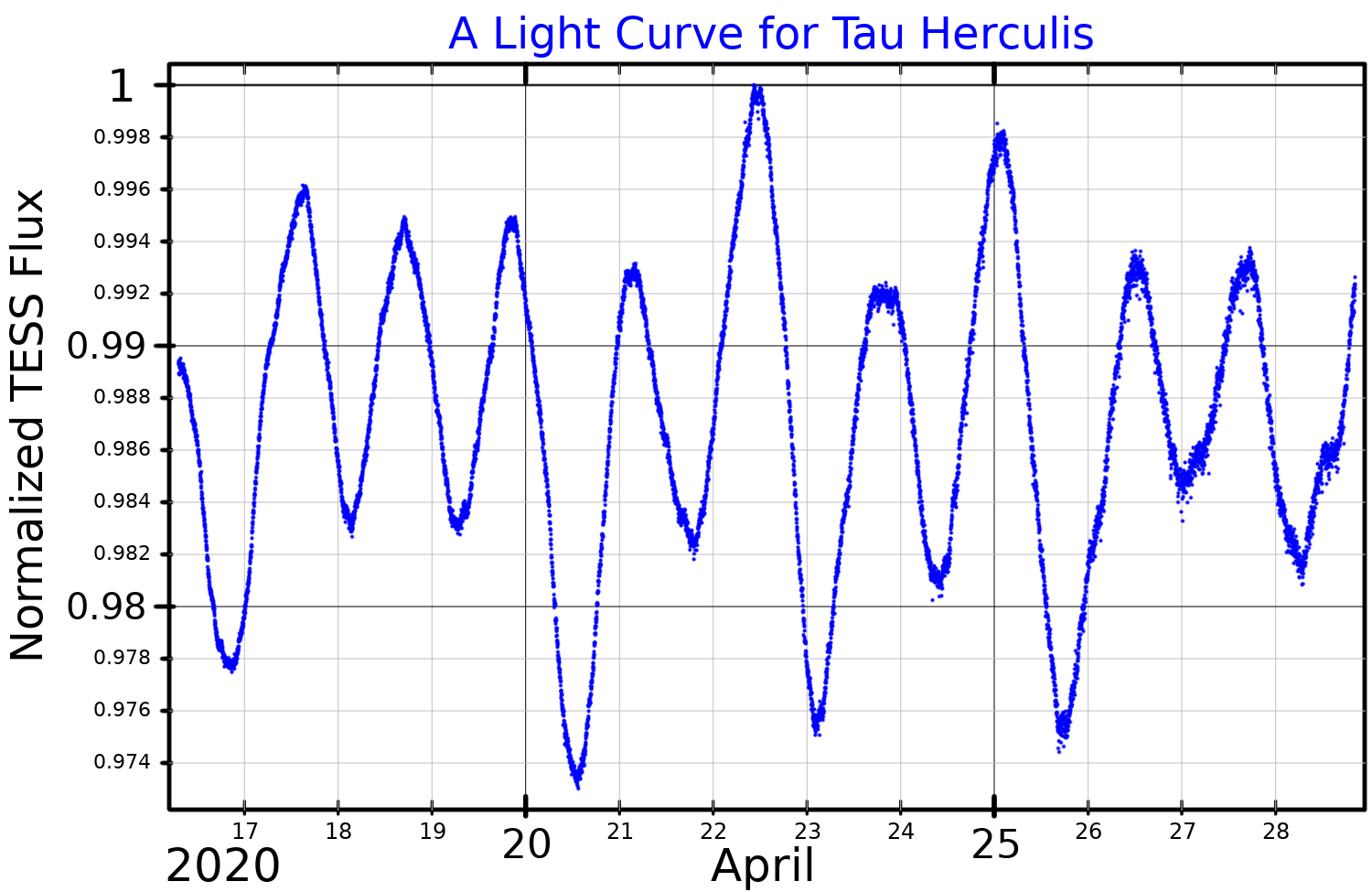
A light curve for Tau Herculis, plotted from TESS data

The stellar classification of Tau Herculis is B5 IV, and it serves as a standard spectrum in the modern Morgan–Keenan (MK) classification. It is estimated to be just 26 million years old with a relatively low projected rotational velocity of 32 km/s. Slowly rotating B-type stars are often chemically peculiar, so the mostly normal spectra of this star suggests we may be viewing it from near pole-on. The abundance of most heavier elements in this star are about 85% of those in the Sun. The star has four times the mass of the Sun and around 3.8 times the Sun's radius. On average, it is radiating 574 times the luminosity of the Sun from its photosphere at an effective temperature of 15,615 K.

During the Hipparcos mission, Tau Herculis was discovered to be a variable star of the slowly pulsating B-type. These are mid-B main sequence stars that vary with a period of about a day; the brightness of Tau Herculis varies by 0.03 magnitude over a period of 1.24970±0.00008 days. The radial velocity of the star varies at a different rate than the photometric period, with the object showing both radial and non-radial pulsation modes.

== Pole star ==
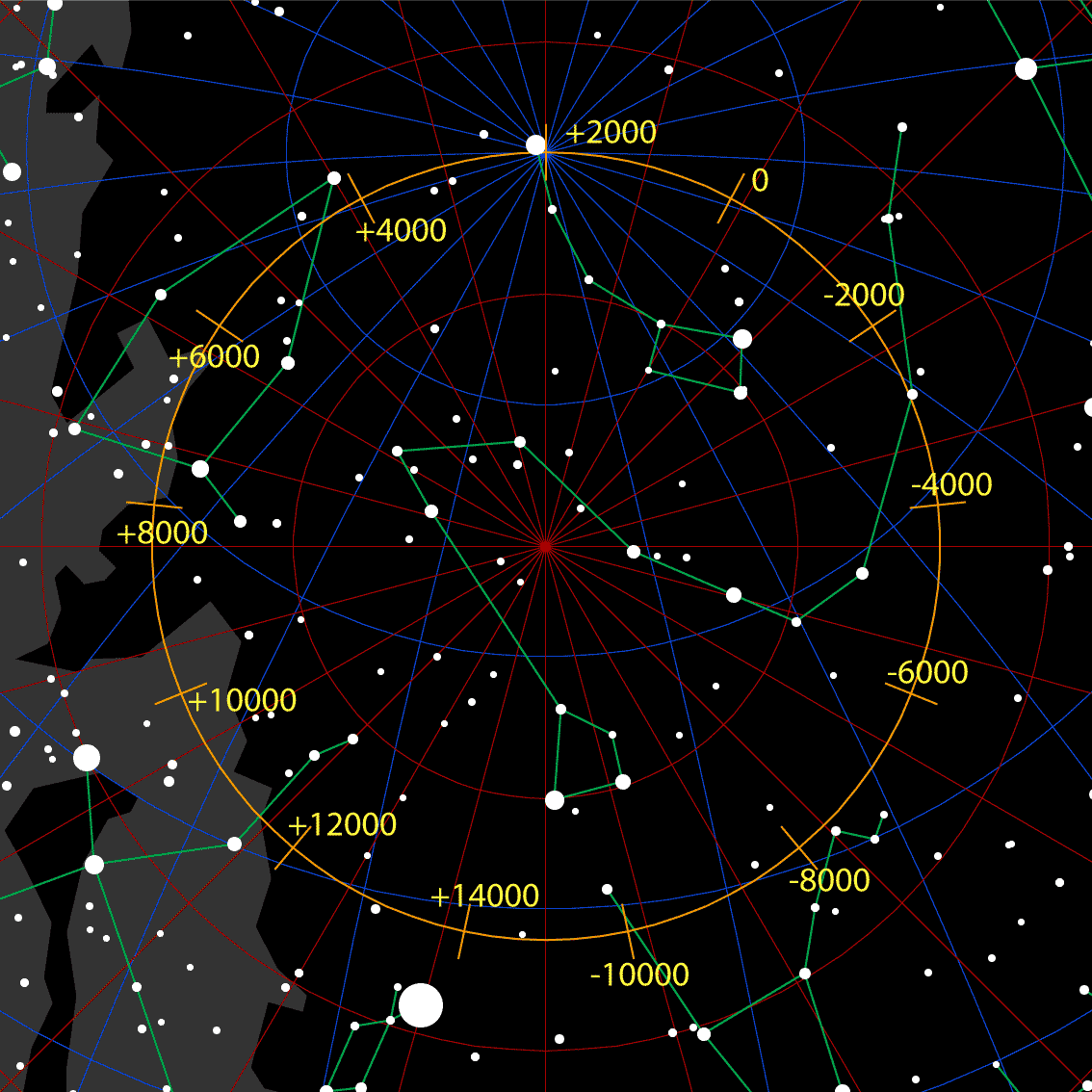
The path of the north celestial pole among the stars due to the precession.

Tau Herculis is located within 1° of the precessional path traced across the celestial sphere by the Earth's North pole. It could have served the northern pole star around the year 7400 BCE, a phenomenon which is expected to reoccur in the year 18,400 due to precession.

Preceded by	Pole Star	Succeeded by
Iota Herculis	18,400 AD	Alpha Draconis
