= Shaowei =

Shaowei or Shao Wei may refer to:

== People ==
- William S. W. Lim (Lin Shaowei, 1932–2023), Singaporean architect
- Luo Shaowei (877–910), Chinese warlord
- Sam Wang (actor) (Wang Shaowei, 1976–), Taiwanese actor
- Shao Wei (poet) (1965–), Chinese-American poet

== Other uses ==
- A military rank in China, see Wei (rank)
- A Chinese star name, which may refer to:
  - Gamma Camelopardalis (as adopted by the IAU)
  - Alpha Camelopardalis
  - Kappa Draconis
