= BK Camelopardalis =

Star in the constellation Camelopardalis

- Location of BK Camelopardalis (circled)

Observation data Epoch J2000 Equinox ICRS
- Constellation: Camelopardalis
- Right ascension: 03^{h} 19^{m} 59.27222^{s}
- Declination: +65° 39′ 08.2519″
- Apparent magnitude (V): 4.76 - 4.90

Characteristics
- Evolutionary stage: main sequence
- Spectral type: B2.5 Vne
- U−B color index: −0.77
- B−V color index: −0.108±0.002
- R−I color index: −0.13
- Variable type: Be star

Astrometry
Radial velocity (R_{v})	−3.4±3.5 km/s
Proper motion (μ)	RA: +10.506 mas/yr Dec.: −14.677 mas/yr
Parallax (π)	6.0704±0.3539 mas
Distance	540 ± 30 ly (165 ± 10 pc)
Absolute magnitude (M_{V})	−2.07

Details
Mass	7.5 M_{☉}
Radius	4.0 R_{☉}
Luminosity	1080.69 L_{☉}
Surface gravity (log g)	4.20 cgs
Temperature	18,720 K
Rotational velocity (v sin i)	328 km/s
Age	31.6 Myr

Other designations
- BK Cam, BD+65°340, HD 20336, HIP 15520, HR 985, SAO 12704

Database references
SIMBAD	data

BK Camelopardalis is a variable star in the northern circumpolar constellation of Camelopardalis, near the constellation border with Cassiopeia. It is visible to the naked eye as a faint, blue-white hued star with an apparent visual magnitude that fluctuates around 4.8. The star is located approximately 540 light years away from the Sun based on parallax. It is a proposed member of the Cassiopeia–Taurus group of co-moving stars.

== Description ==
This is a main sequence Be star with a stellar classification of B2.5 Vne, where the 'n' suffix indicates "nebulous" (broad) lines due to rapid rotation. The presence of emission lines in the spectrum has been known since at least 1895. Spectrograms of the star have been taken since 1905, providing a long history of its cycles of variation. It ranges in brightness from a peak of 4.76 down to 4.90.

BK Camelopardalis is 32 million years old and is spinning with a projected rotational velocity of 328 km/s. It has 7.5 times the mass of the Sun and four times the Sun's radius. The star is radiating 1,081 times the luminosity of the Sun from its photosphere at an effective temperature of 18,720 K.

This star lies at the center of a circular, disk-like structure spanning 1.4°, which may be a "magnetic funnel-like structure" that is emitting in the radio band. Neutral hydrogen along the trajectory of this star has been found to be deficient, which may be the result of ionizing radiation from the star.

Two stars have been resolved close to BK Camelopardalis. The first, designated Ab, is separated by about 0.13 arcseconds. If it is physically associated with BK Camelopardalis, it would have an orbital period of several decades. The second star is designated as B but is likely an optical pair with the central BK Camelopardalis; that is, a chance alignment.

== Chinese name ==
In Chinese, 紫微右垣 (Zǐ Wēi Yòu Yuán), meaning Right Wall of Purple Forbidden Enclosure, refers to an asterism consisting of BK Camelopardalis, α Draconis, κ Draconis, λ Draconis, 24 Ursae Majoris, 43 Camelopardalis and α Camelopardalis. Consequently, BK Camelopardalis itself is known as 紫微右垣七 (Zǐ Wēi Yòu Yuán qī, English: the Seventh Star of Right Wall of Purple Forbidden Enclosure) representing 上丞 (Shǎngchéng), meaning First Prime Minister. The identification of Shangcheng has varied across historical sources, and the IAU Working Group on Star Names has adopted it as a name for HD 19275, based on an older identification.
