= Thuban =

Star in the constellation of Draco

- Location of Thuban (circled)

Observation data Epoch J2000 Equinox ICRS
- Constellation: Draco
- Pronunciation: /ˈθjuːbæn/
- Right ascension: 14^{h} 04^{m} 23.3500^{s}
- Declination: +64° 22′ 33.062″
- Apparent magnitude (V): 3.67

Characteristics
- Spectral type: A0IV + A1V
- U−B color index: −0.08
- B−V color index: −0.049±0.005
- Variable type: suspected Maia

Astrometry
Radial velocity (R_{v})	−13.0 km/s
Proper motion (μ)	RA: −56.34 mas/yr Dec.: 17.21 mas/yr
Parallax (π)	10.76±0.17 mas
Distance	303 ± 5 ly (93 ± 1 pc)
Absolute magnitude (M_{V})	−1.20

Orbit
Period (P)	51.417350 d
Semi-major axis (a)	5.52 mas
Eccentricity (e)	0.43
Inclination (i)	85.4°
Longitude of the node (Ω)	252.6°
Periastron epoch (T)	JD 2453498.8
Argument of periastron (ω) (secondary)	22.4°
Semi-amplitude (K_{1}) (primary)	48.512 km/s
Semi-amplitude (K_{2}) (secondary)	63.58 km/s

Details

α Draconis A Alpha Draconis A
Mass	3.186 M_{☉}
Radius	4.932 R_{☉}
Luminosity	240 L_{☉}
Surface gravity (log g)	3.555 cgs
Temperature	10225 K
Rotational velocity (v sin i)	25.4 km/s
Age	280 Myr

α Draconis B Alpha Draconis B
Mass	2.431 M_{☉}
Radius	2.326 R_{☉}
Luminosity	47.5 L_{☉}
Surface gravity (log g)	4.090 cgs
Temperature	9930 K
Rotational velocity (v sin i)	168 km/s
Age	345 Myr

Other designations
- Alpha Dra, α Dra, 11 Dra, AG+64°666, BD+65°978, FK5 521, GC 19019, HD 123299, HIP 68756, HR 5291, SAO 16273, PPM 18861, PLX 3209, TYC 4174-1262-1, GSC 04174-01262, IRAS 14030+6436, 2MASS J14042335+6422331

Database references
SIMBAD	data

Thuban is a binary star system in the northern constellation of Draco. It has the Bayer designation Alpha Draconis or α Draconis. A relatively inconspicuous star in the night sky of the Northern Hemisphere, it is historically significant as having been the north pole star from the 4th to 2nd millennium BC.

Johann Bayer gave Thuban the designation Alpha and placed it as the only member of his secundae magnitude class in Draco, although its current apparent magnitude of 3.65 means it is 3.7 times fainter than the brightest star in the constellation, Gamma Draconis (Eltanin), which Bayer placed in his tertiae magnitude class although its current apparent magnitude is 2.24.

== Nomenclature ==
α Draconis (Latinised to Alpha Draconis) is the star's Bayer designation.

The traditional name Thuban is derived from the Arabic word ثعبان ṯuʿbān (large snake—e.g., a python or a legendary, draconian serpent). It is sometimes known as the Dragon's Tail, and as Adib /əˈdiːb/. In 2016, the International Astronomical Union organized a Working Group on Star Names (WGSN) to catalog and standardize proper names for stars. The WGSN's first bulletin of July 2016 included a table of the first two batches of names approved by the WGSN, which included Thuban for this star. It is now so entered in the IAU Catalog of Star Names.

In Chinese, 紫微右垣 (Zǐ Wēi Yòu Yuán), meaning Right Wall of Purple Forbidden Enclosure, refers to an asterism consisting of Alpha Draconis, Kappa Draconis, Lambda Draconis, 24 Ursae Majoris, 43 Camelopardalis, Alpha Camelopardalis and BK Camelopardalis. Consequently, the Chinese name for Alpha Draconis itself is 紫微右垣一 (Zǐ Wēi Yòu Yuán yī, English: First Star of Right Wall of Purple Forbidden Enclosure), representing 右樞 (Yòushū), meaning Right Pivot.

== Visibility ==
Given good viewing conditions, Thuban is relatively easy to spot in the night sky, due to its location in relation to the Big Dipper (aka the Plough) asterism of Ursa Major. While it is well known that the two outer stars of the 'dipper' point to the modern-day pole star Polaris, it is less well known that the two inner stars, Phecda and Megrez, point to Thuban, just 15 degrees of arc from Megrez. Thuban is not bright enough to be viewed from badly light-polluted areas.

=== Pole star ===
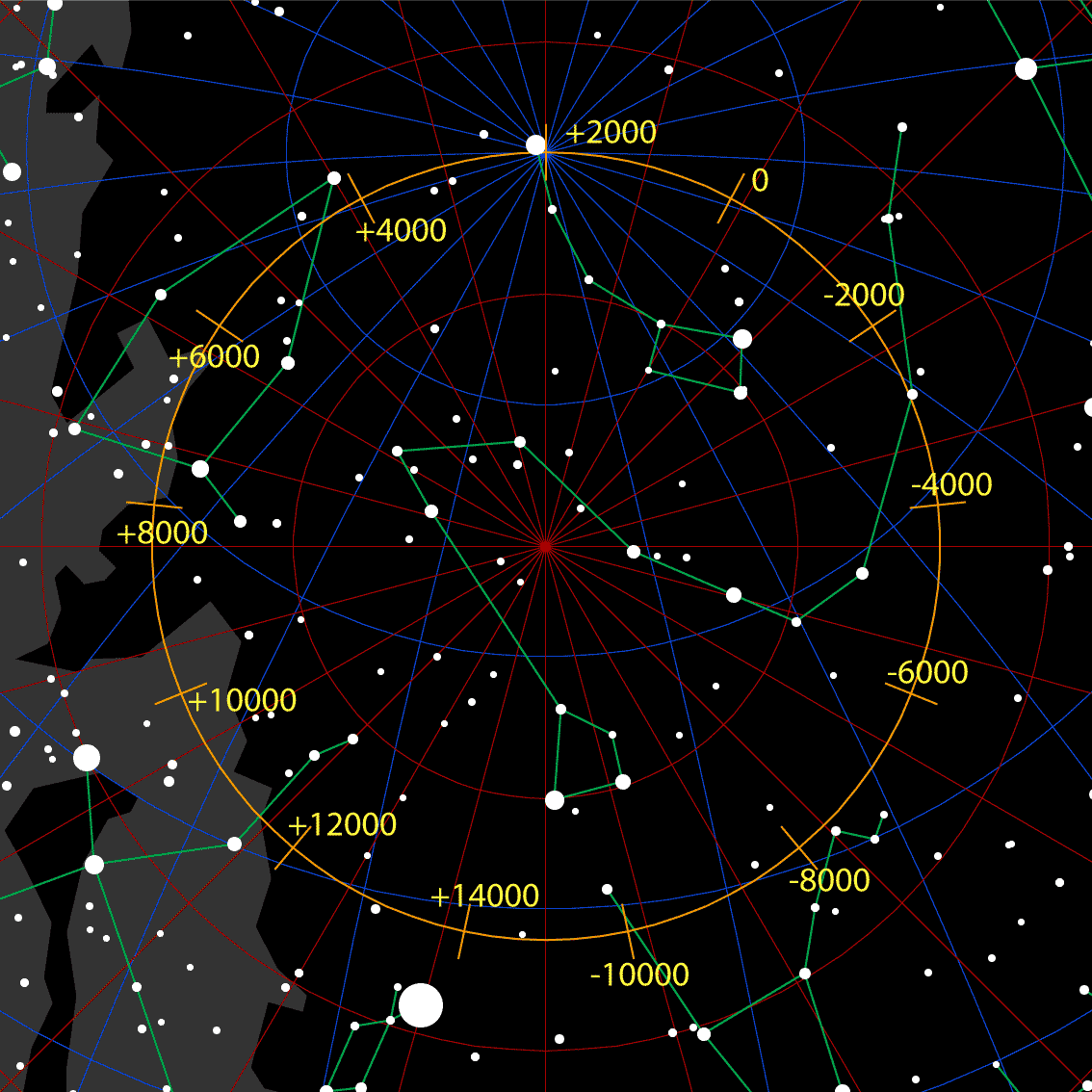
Precession of the equinoxes for the Pole Star. Thuban is toward the right of the image, below the −2000 mark.

Due to the precession of Earth's rotational axis, Thuban was the naked-eye star closest to the North Pole from 3942 BC, when it superseded Tau Herculis as the pole star, until 1793 BC, when it was superseded by Kappa Draconis. It was closest to the pole in 2830 BC, when it was less than 10 arcminutes away from the pole. It remained within one degree of celestial north for nearly 200 years afterwards, and even 900 years after its closest approach, was just 5° off the pole. Thuban was considered the pole star until about 1800 BC, when the much brighter Beta Ursae Minoris (Kochab) began to approach the pole as well.

Having gradually drifted away from the pole over the last 4800 years, Thuban is now seen in the night sky at a declination of 64° 20′ 45.6″, RA 14^{h} 04^{m} 33.58^{s}. After moving nearly 47° off the pole by 10,000 AD, Thuban will gradually move back toward the north celestial pole. In 20,346 AD, it will again be the pole star, that year reaching a maximum declination of 88° 43′ 17.3″, at right ascension 19^{h} 08^{m} 54.17^{s}.

Preceded by	Pole star	Succeeded by
Tau Herculis	c. 3900–1800 BC	Kochab

== Binary system ==
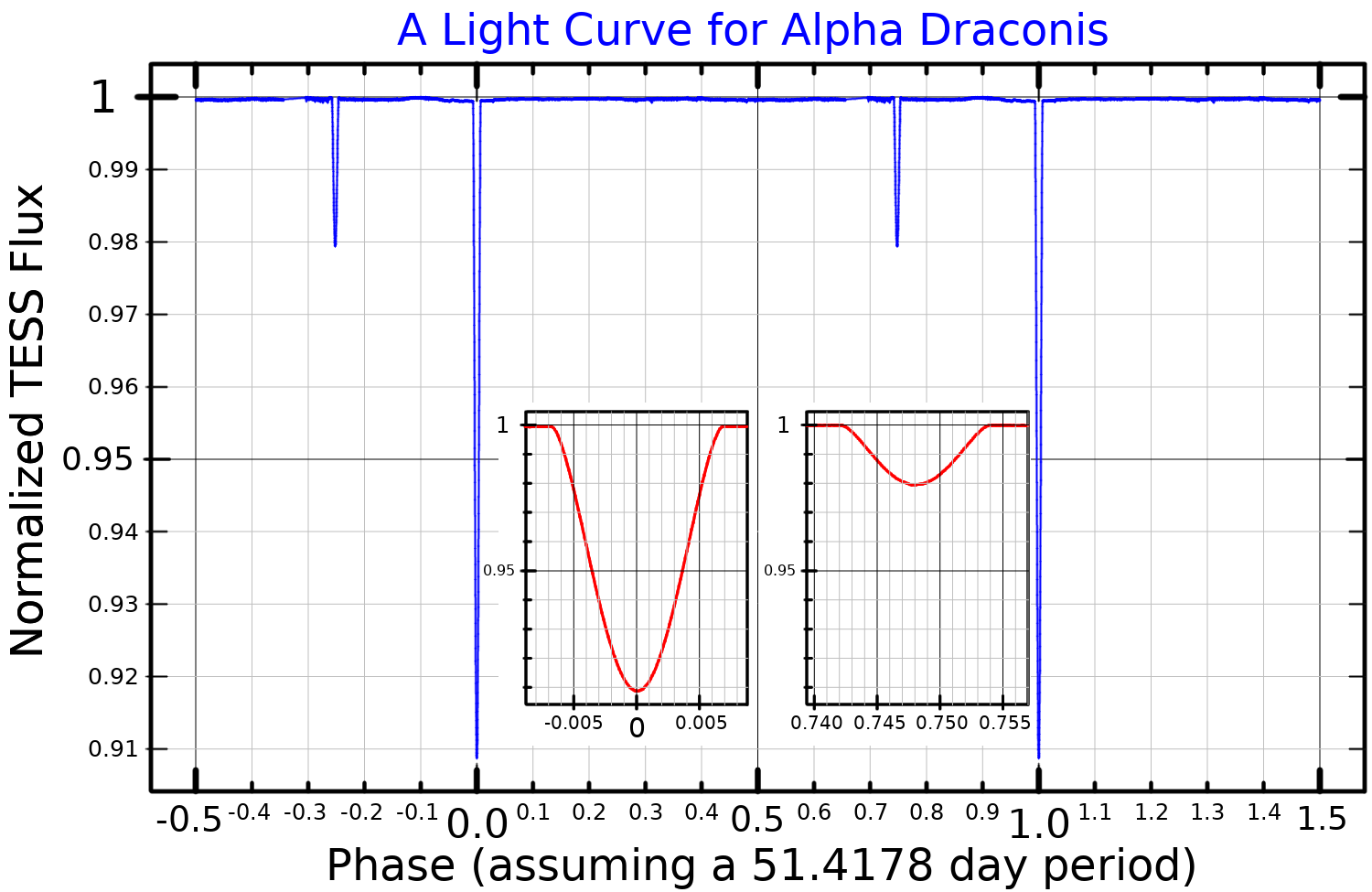
A light curve for Thuban, plotted from TESS data. The main plot shows the entire light curve, and the inset plots show the primary and secondary minima with an expanded scale.

Thuban is a single-lined spectroscopic binary. For a long time, only the primary star could be detected in the spectrum. The radial velocity variations of the stars can be measured and the pair have a somewhat eccentric orbit of 51.4 days. The secondary is a main-sequence star slightly cooler than the primary, with an A1 spectral class.

The secondary star was detected in high spatial resolution observations using the Navy Precision Optical Interferometer. The secondary star is 1.8 magnitudes (at 700 nm) fainter than the primary star and was detected at separations ranging from 6.2 to 2.6 milliarcseconds. Eclipses were detected using data obtained with the Transiting Exoplanet Survey Satellite (TESS). The presence of eclipses places Thuban into the class of binaries known as eclipsing binaries.

== Properties ==
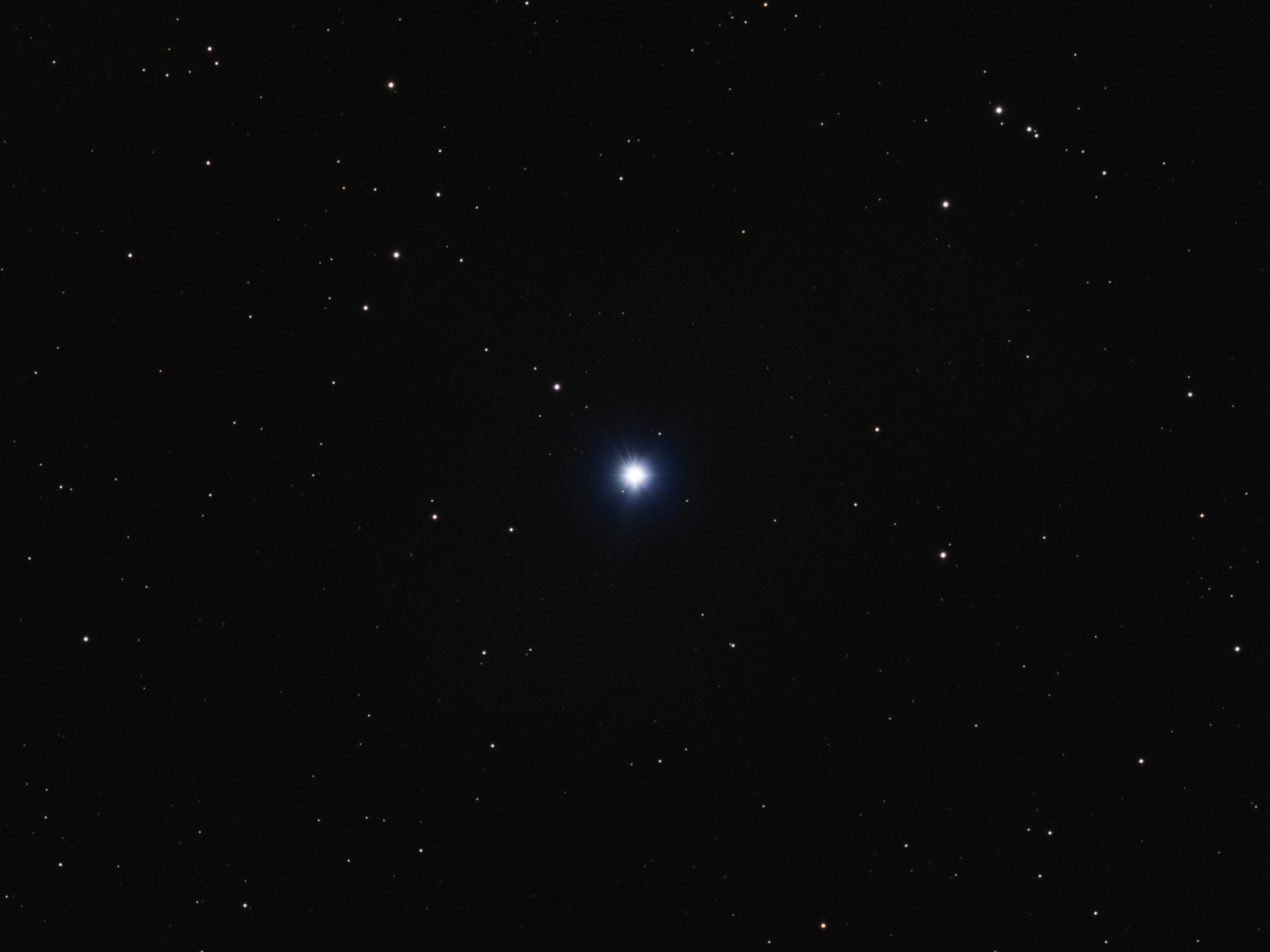
Thuban (α Dra) in optical light

Thuban has a spectral class of A0III, indicating its similarity to Vega in temperature and spectrum, but more luminous and more massive. It has been used as an MK spectral standard for the A0III type.

Thuban is not a main-sequence star; it has now ceased hydrogen fusion in its core. That makes it a white giant star, being 120 times more luminous than the Sun. It is 300 light-years away and its brightness is only decreased by 0.003 of a magnitude by intervening gas and dust.
