= 43 Camelopardalis =

Star in the constellation Camelopardalis

- Location of 43 Camelopardalis (circled in red)

Observation data Epoch J2000.0 Equinox ICRS
- Constellation: Camelopardalis
- Right ascension: 06^{h} 53^{m} 42.24792^{s}
- Declination: +68° 53′ 17.9238″
- Apparent magnitude (V): 5.11

Characteristics
- Spectral type: B7 III
- B−V color index: −0.114±0.003

Astrometry
| Radial velocity (R_{v}) | −21.0±4.2 km/s |
| Proper motion (μ) | RA: +5.001 mas/yr Dec.: +7.450 mas/yr |
| Parallax (π) | 3.0749±0.1698 mas |
| Distance | 1,060 ± 60 ly (330 ± 20 pc) |
| Absolute magnitude (M_{V}) | −2.26 |

Details
| Mass | 5.01±0.31 M_{☉} |
| Radius | 4.4 R_{☉} |
| Luminosity | 724 L_{☉} |
| Temperature | 13,183 K |
| Rotational velocity (v sin i) | 190 km/s |

Other designations
- 43 Cam, BD+69°394, FK5 259, GC 8957, HD 49340, HIP 33104, HR 2511, SAO 13986

Database references
| SIMBAD | data |

43 Camelopardalis is a single star in the northern circumpolar constellation of Camelopardalis, located roughly 1,060 light years away from the Sun based on parallax. It is visible to the naked eye as a faint, blue-white hued star with an apparent visual magnitude of 5.11. This object is moving closer to the Earth with a heliocentric radial velocity of −21 km/s.

The stellar classification of 43 Camelopardalis is B7 III, matching that of a blue giant. It is spinning rapidly with a projected rotational velocity of 190 km/s. The star has five times the mass of the Sun and about 4.4 times the Sun's radius. It is radiating 724 times the luminosity of the Sun from its photosphere at an effective temperature of 13,183 K.

== Chinese name ==
In Chinese language, 紫微右垣 (Zǐ Wēi Yòu Yuán), meaning Right Wall of Purple Forbidden Enclosure, refers to an asterism consisting of 43 Camelopardalis, α Draconis, κ Draconis, λ Draconis, 24 Ursae Majoris, α Camelopardalis and BK Camelopardalis. Consequently, 43 Camelopardalis itself is known as 紫微右垣五 (Zǐ Wēi Yòu Yuán wǔ, English: the Fifth Star of Right Wall of Purple Forbidden Enclosure), representing 上衛 (Shǎngwèi), meaning First Imperial Guard. 上衛 (Shǎngwèi) is westernized into Shang Wei by R.H. Allen, the meaning is "Higher Guard", but it is not clearly designated. The identification of Shangwei has varied across historical sources, and the IAU Working Group on Star Names has adopted it as a name for HD 42818, based on an older identification.
