= Lambda Draconis =

Star in the constellation Draco

λ Draconis
- Location of λ Draconis (circled)

Observation data Epoch J2000 Equinox ICRS
- Constellation: Draco
- Right ascension: 11^{h} 31^{m} 24.22075^{s}
- Declination: +69° 19′ 51.8696″
- Apparent magnitude (V): +3.77 to 3.86

Characteristics
- Evolutionary stage: asymptotic giant branch
- Spectral type: M0III-IIIa Ca1
- U−B color index: +1.97
- B−V color index: +1.62
- Variable type: slow irregular

Astrometry
Radial velocity (R_{v})	+6.58±0.30 km/s
Proper motion (μ)	RA: −40.97 mas/yr Dec.: −19.19 mas/yr
Parallax (π)	9.79±0.15 mas
Distance	333 ± 5 ly (102 ± 2 pc)
Absolute magnitude (M_{V})	−1.14±0.033

Details
Mass	1.53±0.12 M_{☉}
Radius	69.99+1.06 −1.10 R_{☉}
Luminosity	884±52 L_{☉}
Surface gravity (log g)	1.10±0.05 cgs
Temperature	3,761±47 K
Metallicity [Fe/H]	0.00 dex
Age	2.33±0.48 Gyr

Other designations
- Giausar, λ Dra, 1 Dra, BD+70 665, FK5 433, HD 100029, HIP 56211, HR 4434, SAO 15532

Database references
SIMBAD	data

Lambda Draconis (λ Draconis, abbreviated Lam Dra, λ Dra), also named Giausar (/ˈdʒɔːzɑːr/ JAW-zar), is a solitary, orange-red star in the northern circumpolar constellation of Draco. It is visible to the naked eye with an apparent visual magnitude of around +3.8. Based upon an annual parallax shift of 9.79 mas as seen from the Earth, the star is located around 333 light years from the Sun.

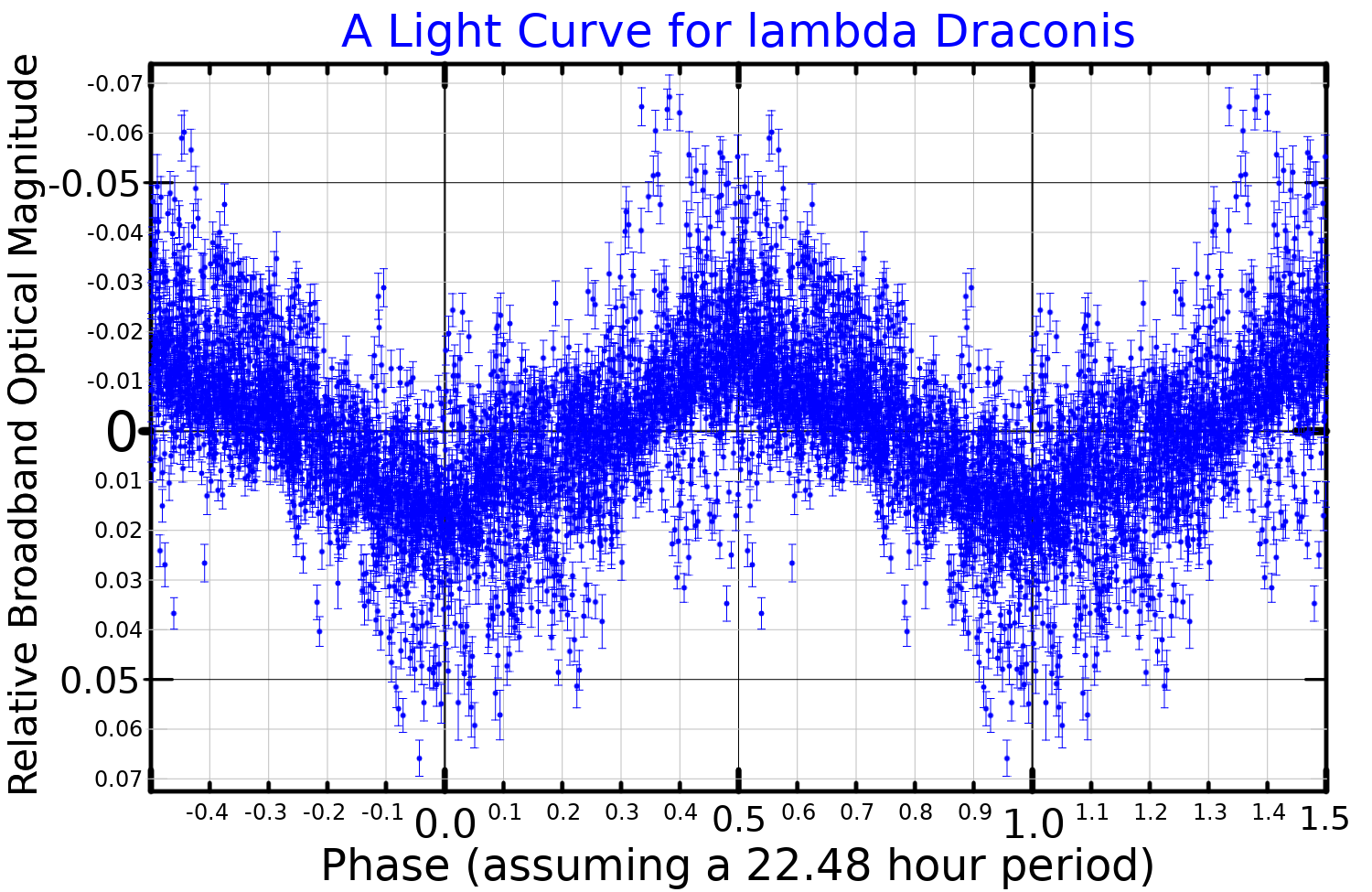
A light curve for Lambda Draconis, potted from MASCARA data

This is an evolved red giant star on the asymptotic giant branch with a stellar classification of M0III-IIIa Ca1. It is a suspected slow irregular variable with a periodicity of roughly 1,100 days. It has an estimated 1.53 times the mass of the Sun and a measured radius of 70 times the radius of the Sun. It is radiating 884 times the solar luminosity from its photosphere at an effective temperature of 3,761 K.

== Nomenclature ==
λ Draconis (Latinised to Lambda Draconis) is the star's Bayer designation.

It bore the traditional name Giausar (also written as Gianfar, Giansar and Giauzar) and Juza. This name comes from the Persian term jauzahr, referring to the nodes of the Moon's (or any) orbit. In 2016, the International Astronomical Union organized a Working Group on Star Names (WGSN) to catalogue and standardize proper names for stars. The WGSN approved the name Giausar for this star on February 1, 2017, and it is now so included in the List of IAU-approved Star Names.

In Chinese, 紫微右垣 (Zǐ Wēi Yòu Yuán), meaning Right Wall of Purple Forbidden Enclosure, refers to an asterism consisting of Lambda Draconis, Alpha Draconis, Kappa Draconis, 24 Ursae Majoris, 43 Camelopardalis, Alpha Camelopardalis and BK Camelopardalis. Consequently, the Chinese name for Lambda Draconis itself is 紫微右垣三 (Zǐ Wēi Yòu Yuán sān, English: the Third Star of Right Wall of Purple Forbidden Enclosure), representing 上輔 (Shàngfǔ), meaning First Minister. 上輔 (Shàngfǔ) was westernized into Sang Poo or Shaou Poo by R.H. Allen.

== Namesakes ==
USS Giansar (AK-111) was a United States Navy Crater class cargo ship named after the star.
