= Alpha Camelopardalis =

Star in the constellation Camelopardalis

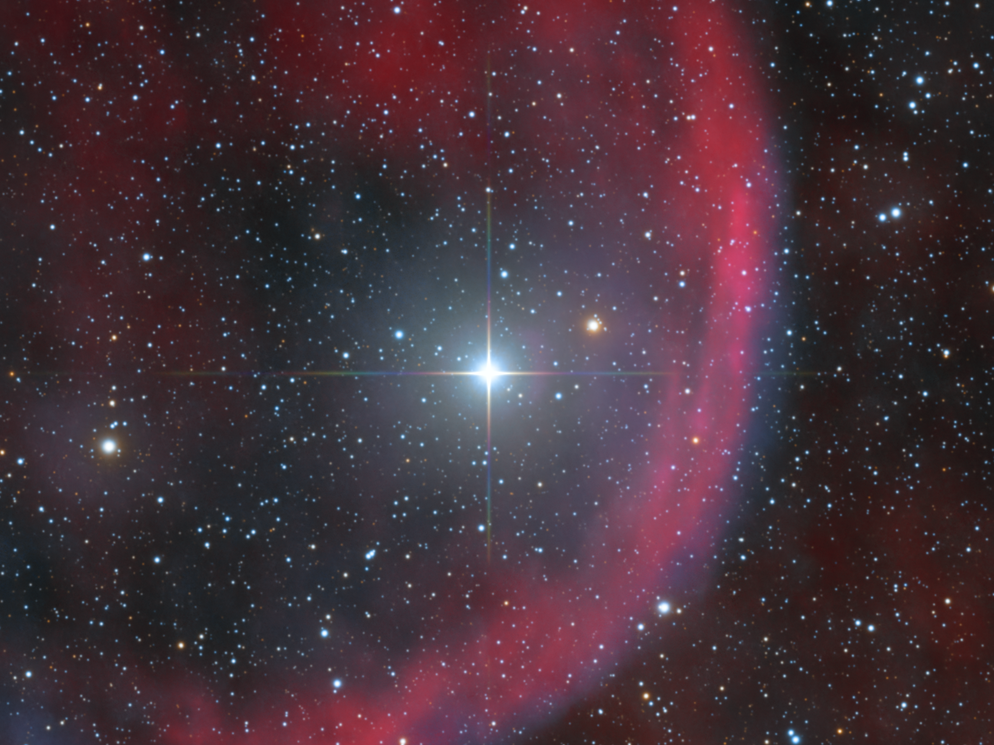
- Images of Alpha Camelopardalis

Observation data Epoch J2000.0 Equinox J2000.0 (ICRS)
- Constellation: Camelopardalis
- Right ascension: 04^{h} 54^{m} 03.011^{s}
- Declination: +66° 20′ 33.63″
- Apparent magnitude (V): 4.29

Characteristics
- Evolutionary stage: Blue supergiant
- Spectral type: O9Ia
- U−B color index: −0.87
- B−V color index: +0.05
- R−I color index: 0.00

Astrometry
Radial velocity (R_{v})	+6.1 km/s
Proper motion (μ)	RA: +0.222 mas/yr Dec.: +7.198 mas/yr
Parallax (π)	0.5916±0.1333 mas
Distance	2,580 ± 330 ly (790±100 pc)
Absolute magnitude (M_{V})	−7.1

Details
Mass	37.6 M_{☉}
Radius	20.7 R_{☉}
Luminosity	676,000 L_{☉}
Surface gravity (log g)	2.97 cgs
Temperature	29,000 K
Rotational velocity (v sin i)	100 km/s
Age	~2 Myr

Other designations
- α Cam, Alpha Cam, 9 Camelopardalis, 9 Cam, BD+66 358, FK5 178, GC 5924, HD 30614, HIP 22783, HR 1542, SAO 13298, PPM 15047, WDS J04541+6621, IRAS 04490+6615

Database references
SIMBAD	data

Alpha Camelopardalis is a blue hued star in the northern constellation of Camelopardalis. Its name is a Bayer designation that is Latinized from α Camelopardalis, and abbreviated Alpha Cam or α Cam. With an apparent visual magnitude of 4.3, it is visible to the naked eye as the third-brightest star in this not-very-prominent circumpolar constellation; the first and second-brightest stars being Beta Camelopardalis and CS Camelopardalis, respectively.

== Description ==
Location of α Camelopardalis (circled)

Alpha Camelopardalis has a stellar classification of O9 Ia, with the 'Ia' luminosity class indicating that it is a luminous O-type blue supergiant. It is a massive star with 37.6 times the mass of the Sun and 32.5 times the Sun's radius. The effective temperature of the outer envelope is 29,000 K; much hotter than the Sun's effective temperature of 5,778 K, giving it the characteristic blue hue of an O-type star. It is emitting 676,000 times the luminosity of the Sun and is a weak X-ray emitter. It has a high rate of spin, showing a projected rotational velocity of 100 km/s.

Variations in the profiles of Alpha Camelopardalis' spectral lines are caused by fluctuations in the photosphere and stellar wind. This may be caused by non-radial pulsations. The absorption lines in the optical spectrum show radial velocity variations, although there is significant uncertainty about the period. Estimates range from a period as low as 0.36 days up to 2.93 days. The stellar wind from this star is not smooth and continuous, but instead shows a behavior indicating clumping at both large and small scales. This star is losing mass rapidly through its stellar wind at a rate of approximately 6.3×10^{−6} solar masses per year, or the equivalent of the mass of the Sun every 160,000 years.

In 1968, this star was classified as a spectroscopic binary, indicating that it has an orbiting stellar companion with a period of 3.68 days and an orbital eccentricity of 0.45. Subsequent studies refined the period to 3.24 days. However, in 2006 it was recognized that the changes in the spectrum were probably the result of changes in the atmosphere or stellar wind, so it is more likely a single star. Speckle interferometry observations with the 3.67 m Advanced Electro Optical System Telescope at the Haleakala Observatory failed to detect a secondary component.

In 1961, based on the criteria that the proper motion of this star indicates a space velocity of greater than 30 km/s, Alpha Camelopardalis was suggested as a candidate runaway star that had been ejected from the cluster NGC 1502. This was based upon the kinematic properties of the star and cluster, as well as the location of this star at a high galactic latitude in an area otherwise lacking in stellar associations. Over the course of a million years, this star should have moved only 1.4° across the sky, while it was estimated as being only two million years old.

Runaway stars such as this with a stellar wind that is moving at supersonic velocity through the interstellar medium have their wind confined by a bow shock due to ram pressure. The dust in this bow shock can be detected using an infrared telescope. Just such a bow shock was observed with NASA's Wide-field Infrared Survey Explorer, or WISE. The star is traveling with a peculiar velocity of somewhere between 680 and 4,200 kilometers per second: between 1.5 and 9.4 million mph.

== Chinese name ==
In Chinese astronomy, 紫微右垣 (Zǐ Wēi Yòu Yuán), meaning Right Wall of Purple Forbidden Enclosure, refers to an asterism consisting of α Camelopardalis, α Draconis, κ Draconis, λ Draconis, 24 Ursae Majoris, 43 Camelopardalis and BK Camelopardalis. Consequently, the Chinese name for α Camelopardalis itself is 紫微右垣六 (Zǐ Wēi Yòu Yuán liù, English: the Sixth Star of Right Wall of Purple Forbidden Enclosure), representing 少衛 (Shǎowèi), meaning Second Imperial Guard. 少衛 (Shǎowèi) is westernized into Shaou Wei by R. H. Allen, the meaning is "Minor Guard", but it is not clearly designated. The identification of Shaowei has varied across historical sources, and the IAU Working Group on Star Names has adopted it as a name for γ Camelopardalis, based on an older identification.
