= Rho Ursae Majoris =

Solitary red giant star in the constellation Ursa Major

- Location of ρ Ursae Majoris (circled)

Observation data Epoch J2000.0 Equinox J2000.0 (ICRS)
- Constellation: Ursa Major
- Right ascension: 09^{h} 02^{m} 32.69092^{s}
- Declination: +67° 37′ 46.6280″
- Apparent magnitude (V): 4.74

Characteristics
- Spectral type: M3 III
- U−B color index: +1.84
- B−V color index: +1.56

Astrometry
| Radial velocity (R_{v}) | 4.75±0.19 km/s |
| Proper motion (μ) | RA: −22.83 mas/yr Dec.: +18.13 mas/yr |
| Parallax (π) | 10.37±0.25 mas |
| Distance | 315 ± 8 ly (96 ± 2 pc) |
| Absolute magnitude (M_{V}) | +0.06 |

Details
| Radius | 58 R_{☉} |
| Luminosity | 464 L_{☉} |
| Temperature | 3,725 K |

Other designations
- ρ UMa, 8 Ursae Majoris, BD+68°551, FK5 338, HD 76827, HIP 44390, HR 3576, SAO 14742

Database references
| SIMBAD | data |

Rho Ursae Majoris (ρ UMa) is the Bayer designation for a solitary star in the northern circumpolar constellation of Ursa Major. It is often faintly visible to the naked eye with an apparent visual magnitude of 4.74. The distance to this star, based upon an annual parallax shift of 10.37 mas, is around 315 light years.

With a stellar classification of M3 III, this is a red giant star on the asymptotic giant branch. It is a suspected small amplitude variable. The measured angular diameter of the star after correcting for limb darkening is 5.64±0.15 mas, which, at the estimated distance of this star, yields a physical size of about 58 times the radius of the Sun. It is radiating 464 times the solar luminosity from its outer atmosphere at an effective temperature of about 3,725 K. Based upon its motion through space, there is a 60.6% chance that this star is a member of the Sirius stream.

== Naming ==
- With π^{1}, π^{2}, σ^{1}, σ^{2}, A and d, it composed the Arabic asterism Al Ṭhibā᾽, the Gazelle. According to the catalogue of stars in the Technical Memorandum 33-507 - A Reduced Star Catalog Containing 537 Named Stars, Al Ṭhibā were the title for seven stars : A as Althiba I, π^{1} as Althiba II, π^{2} as Althiba III, this star (ρ) as Althiba IV, σ^{1} as Althiba V, σ^{2} as Althiba VI, and d as Althiba VII
- In Chinese, 三師 (Sān Shī), meaning Three Top Instructors, refers to an asterism consisting of ρ Ursae Majoris and σ^{2} Ursae Majoris. Consequently, the Chinese name for ρ Ursae Majoris itself is 三師一 (Sān Shī yī, English: the First Star of Three Top Instructors.).
