= Kappa Draconis =

Star in the constellation Draco

- Location of κ Draconis (circled) near the center

Observation data Epoch J2000 Equinox ICRS
- Constellation: Draco
- Right ascension: 12^{h} 33^{m} 28.94206^{s}
- Declination: +69° 47′ 17.6331″
- Apparent magnitude (V): 3.82

Characteristics
- Spectral type: B6 IIIe
- U−B color index: −0.61
- B−V color index: −0.11

Astrometry
Radial velocity (R_{v})	−11.4 km/s
Proper motion (μ)	RA: −58.162 mas/yr Dec.: +11.802 mas/yr
Parallax (π)	7.1387±0.3291 mas
Distance	460 ± 20 ly (140 ± 6 pc)
Absolute magnitude (M_{V})	−1.95 + 2.4

Orbit
Period (P)	61.5496±0.0058 d
Semi-major axis (a)	0.487±0.021 au
Eccentricity (e)	0
Inclination (i)	130.0±3.4°
Longitude of the node (Ω)	118.0±1.3°
Semi-amplitude (K_{1}) (primary)	6.90±0.15 km/s

Details

κ Dra A
Mass	3.65±0.48 M_{☉}
Radius	5.85±0.18 R_{☉}
Luminosity	1,178±151 L_{☉}
Surface gravity (log g)	3.5 cgs
Temperature	13,982±392 K
Metallicity [Fe/H]	−0.65 dex
Rotational velocity (v sin i)	200±12 km/s

κ Dra B
Mass	0.426±0.043 M_{☉}
Radius	0.69±0.07 R_{☉}
Luminosity	33±17 L_{☉}
Temperature	16,700±2,000 K
Rotational velocity (v sin i)	35±10 km/s

Other designations
- κ Dra, 5 Dra, BD+70°703, FK5 472, HD 109387, HIP 61281, HR 4787, SAO 7593

Database references
SIMBAD	data

Kappa Draconis, Latinized from κ Draconis, is a blue giant star located in the northern circumpolar constellation of Draco. At an apparent magnitude of 3.88, it is barely visible to the naked eye when artificial lighting from cities is present. Nevertheless, it is a powerful star, approximately five time as massive as the Sun. It is about 460 light-years away, and is 1,400 times brighter than the Sun.

The star is currently located at declination +69° 47′ 18″ (right ascension 12^{h} 33^{m} 29.0^{s}), but due to the effects of precession, Kappa Draconis was the nearest star to the north celestial pole visible to the naked eye from 1793 BC to approximately 1000 BC, though it was 6° removed from perfect alignment, making it only an approximate pole star, similar to the roughly 7° variance from perfect alignment of the much brighter (magnitude 2.08) star Kochab, at the same time during Earth's precession.

== Properties ==
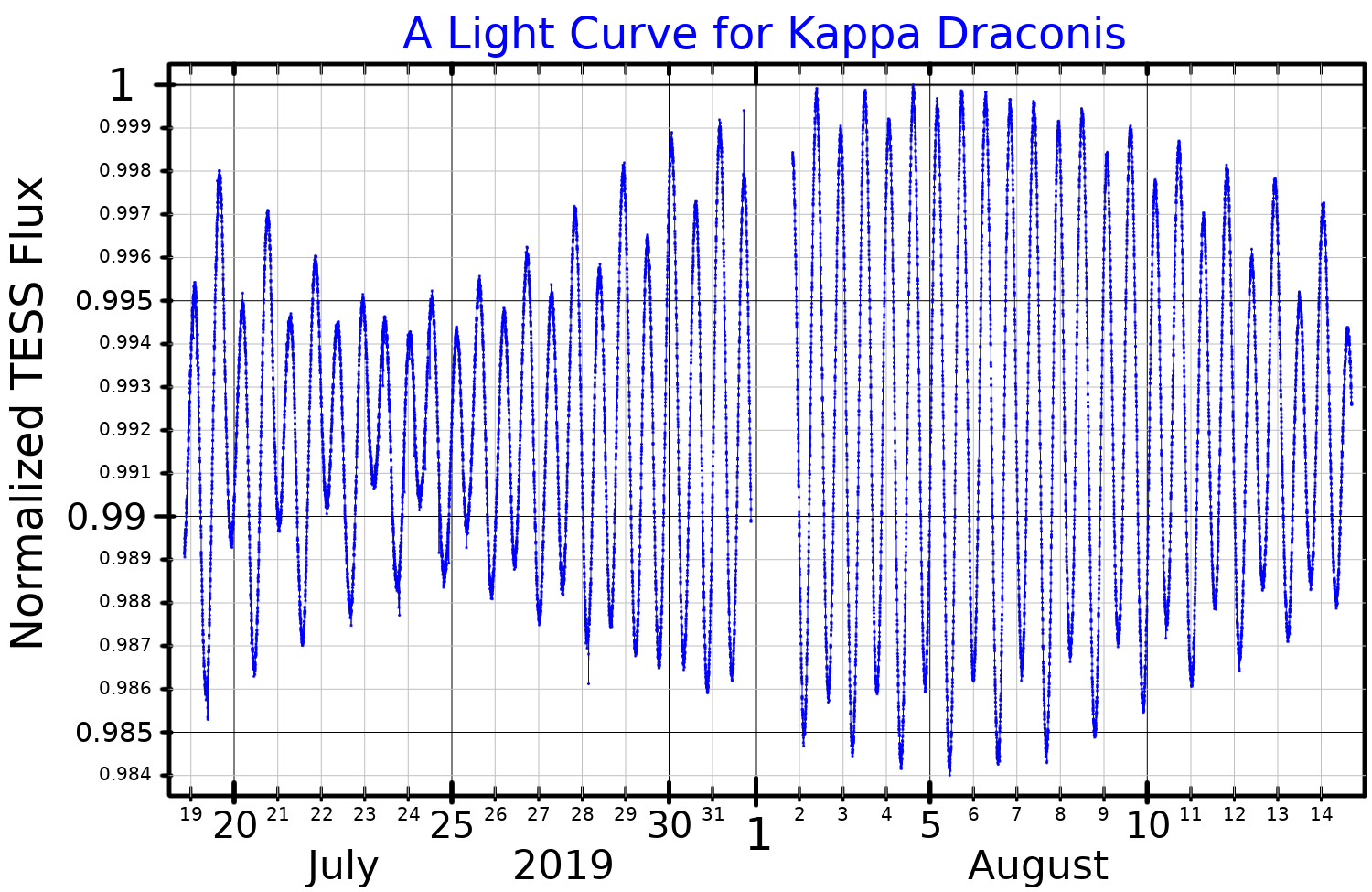
A light curve for Kappa Draconis, plotted from TESS data

Kappa Draconis is a classical Be star, displaying Balmer emission lines in its spectrum. It is spinning rapidly with a projected rotational velocity of 170 km/s. The star is thought to be just entering its red giant phase, having exhausted the supply of hydrogen in its core. Over the next several thousand years, the star will expand, becoming more powerful but with a much cooler surface temperature. Tens of thousands of years from now, Kappa Draconis will appear much brighter, probably shining with a reddish hue.

Kappa Draconis is a single-lined spectroscopic binary. The main Be star is orbited by another stellar companion, on a circular orbit with a period of 61.555 days. The secondary is an unusual star, a subdwarf B star.

The General Catalogue of Variable Stars lists Kappa Draconis as a Gamma Cassiopeiae type star, a type of eruptive irregular variable star, whose visual magnitude varies from 3.82 to 4.01. However Balona and Dziembowsk classify it as a Zeta Ophiuchi star, a type of pulsating variable star, with a primary period of 10.4 hours.

== Chinese name ==
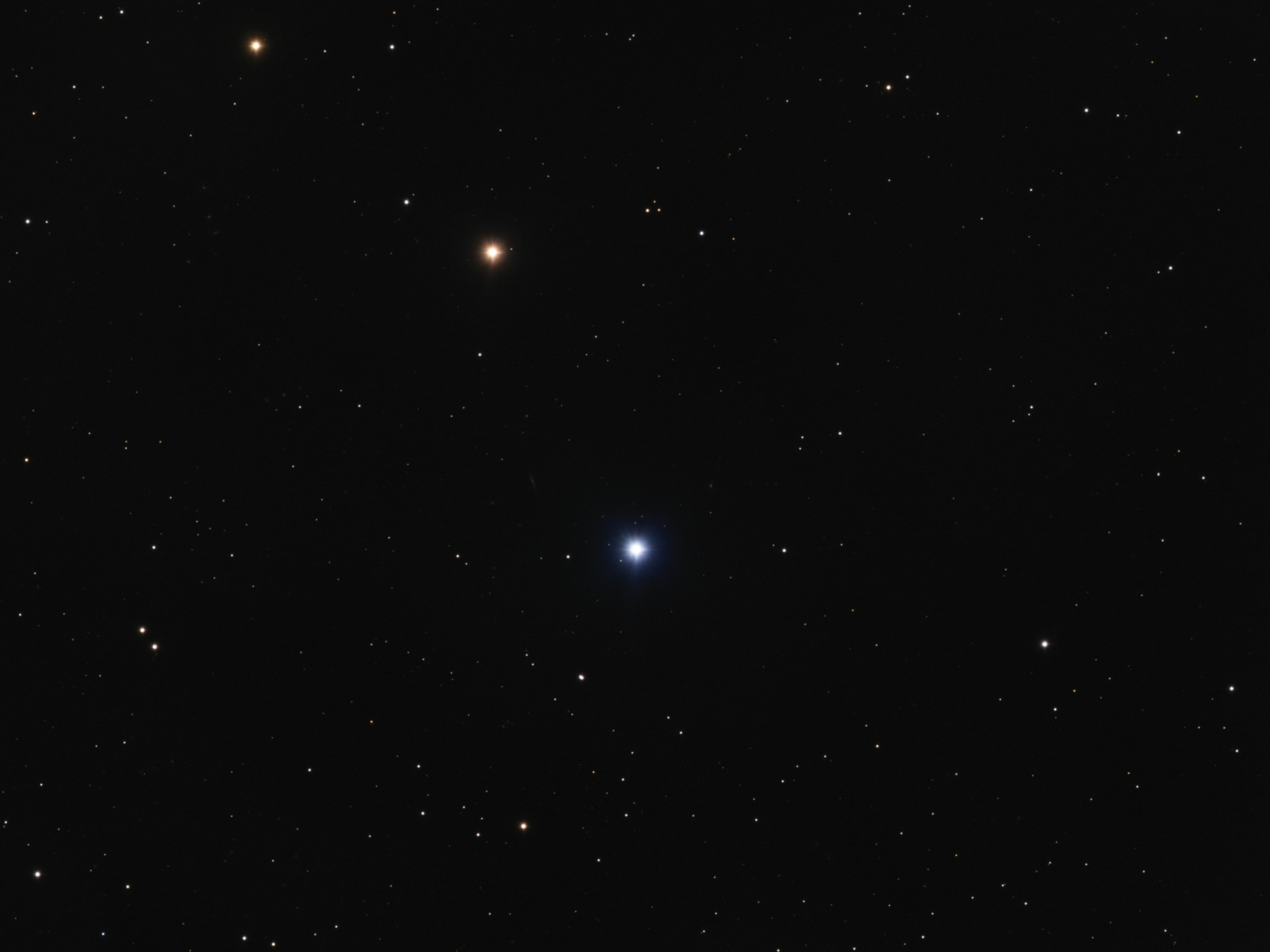
κ Draconis in optical light

In Chinese, 紫微右垣 (Zǐ Wēi Yòu Yuán), meaning Right Wall of Purple Forbidden Enclosure, refers to an asterism consisting of κ Draconis, α Draconis, λ Draconis, 24 Ursae Majoris, 43 Camelopardalis, α Camelopardalis and BK Camelopardalis. Consequently, the Chinese name for κ Draconis itself is 紫微右垣二 (Zǐ Wēi Yòu Yuán èr, English: the Second Star of Right Wall of Purple Forbidden Enclosure.), representing 少尉 (Shàowèi), meaning Second Chief Judge
