= 2 Ursae Majoris =

Am star in the constellation Ursa Major

- Location of 2 Ursae Majoris (circled)

Observation data Epoch J2000 Equinox J2000
- Constellation: Ursa Major
- Right ascension: 08^{h} 34^{m} 36.17989^{s}
- Declination: +65° 08′ 42.4071″
- Apparent magnitude (V): 5.47

Characteristics
- Evolutionary stage: main sequence
- Spectral type: kA3hA5mA7s
- B−V color index: +0.207

Astrometry
Radial velocity (R_{v})	−16.87±0.13 km/s
Proper motion (μ)	RA: −79.362 mas/yr Dec.: −65.977 mas/yr
Parallax (π)	21.7823±0.1487 mas
Distance	150 ± 1 ly (45.9 ± 0.3 pc)
Absolute magnitude (M_{V})	2.12

Details
Mass	1.9 M_{☉}
Radius	1.8 R_{☉}
Luminosity	11.0 L_{☉}
Surface gravity (log g)	4.22 cgs
Temperature	7,912 K
Metallicity [Fe/H]	+0.19 dex
Rotational velocity (v sin i)	11.9 km/s
Age	560 Myr

Other designations
- A UMa, 2 UMa, BD+65°638, HD 72037, HIP 42080, HR 3354

Database references
SIMBAD	data

2 Ursae Majoris (2 UMa) is an Am star in the northern circumpolar constellation of Ursa Major, located 150 light-years from the Sun. It has the Bayer designation A Ursae Majoris; 2 Ursae Majoris is the Flamsteed designation. It is visible to the naked eye as a faint white star with an apparent visual magnitude of 5.5. Currently 150 light years away, it is moving closer to the Earth with a heliocentric radial velocity of −17 km/s.

== Description ==
2 UMa has a stellar classification of kA3hA5mA7s, meaning it has hydrogen absorption lines typical of an A5 star, calcium K lines typical of an A3 star, and other metal absorption lines typical of an A7 star. This form of spectral type is used for Am stars, stars which show an over-abundance of metal lines in their spectrum due to slow rotation that allows stratification of elements within its photosphere. The 's' suffix indicates that the lines are sharp, another indicator of slow rotation. At an estimated age of 560 million years, 2 UMa is a main sequence star, fusing hydrogen into helium within its core. The projected rotational velocity is 11.9 km/s, very slow for a hot main sequence star.

This star has 1.9 times the mass of the Sun and 1.9 times its radius. It is radiating 11 times the Sun's luminosity from its photosphere at an effective temperature of 7,912 K.

== Nomenclature ==
With π^{1}, π^{2}, σ^{1}, σ^{2}, ρ and 24 Ursae Majoris, it composed the Arabic asterism Al Ṭhibā᾽, the Gazelle. According to the catalogue of stars in the Technical Memorandum 33-507 - A Reduced Star Catalog Containing 537 Named Stars, Al Ṭhibā were the title for seven stars : this star as Althiba I, π^{1} as Althiba II, π^{2} as Althiba III, ρ as Althiba IV, σ^{1} as Althiba V, σ^{2} as Althiba VI, and 24 UMa as Althiba VII.
