= Sigma1 Ursae Majoris =

Solitary star in the constellation Ursa Major

Sigma^{1} Ursae Majoris
- Location of σ^{1} Ursae Majoris (circled)

Observation data Epoch J2000.0 Equinox J2000.0 (ICRS)
- Constellation: Ursa Major
- Right ascension: 09^{h} 08^{m} 23.49946^{s}
- Declination: +66° 52′ 23.6492″
- Apparent magnitude (V): 5.14

Characteristics
- Spectral type: K5 III
- U−B color index: +1.80
- B−V color index: +1.52

Astrometry
Radial velocity (R_{v})	14.60±0.19 km/s
Proper motion (μ)	RA: −22.68 mas/yr Dec.: −40.11 mas/yr
Parallax (π)	6.26±0.30 mas
Distance	520 ± 20 ly (160 ± 8 pc)
Absolute magnitude (M_{V})	−0.93

Details
Radius	46 R_{☉}
Luminosity	560±20 L_{☉}
Surface gravity (log g)	1.66 cgs
Temperature	3,940 K
Metallicity [Fe/H]	−0.23 dex

Other designations
- σ^{1} UMa, 11 Ursae Majoris, BD+67°573, HD 77800, HIP 44857, HR 3609, SAO 14769

Database references
SIMBAD	data

Sigma^{1} Ursae Majoris (σ^{1} UMa) is the Bayer designation for a solitary star in the northern circumpolar constellation of Ursa Major. With an apparent visual magnitude of 5.14 it is faintly visible to the naked eye on dark nights. Based upon an annual parallax shift of 6.26 mas, it is located roughly 520 light years from the Sun. At that distance, the visual magnitude of the star is diminished by an extinction factor of 0.06 due to interstellar dust.

This is an evolved K-type giant star with a stellar classification of K5 III. It is a suspected variable with an amplitude of 0.03 magnitude. The measured angular diameter of the star after correcting for limb darkening is 2.67±0.04 mas, which, at the estimated distance of this star, yields a physical size of about 46 times the radius of the Sun. The star is radiating around 560 times the solar luminosity from its outer atmosphere at an effective temperature of 3,940 K.

== Naming ==
With π^{1}, π^{2}, σ^{2}, ρ, A and d, it composed the Arabic asterism Al Ṭhibā᾽, the Gazelle. According to the catalogue of stars in the Technical Memorandum 33-507 - A Reduced Star Catalog Containing 537 Named Stars, Al Ṭhibā were the title for seven stars : A as Althiba I, this star (π^{1}) as Althiba II, π^{2} as Althiba III, ρ as Althiba IV, this star (σ^{1}) as Althiba V, σ^{2} as Althiba VI, and d as Althiba VII.
