= Mu Boötis =

The Bayer designation Mu Boötis (μ Boötis / μ Boo) is shared by two star systems, in the constellation Boötes, separated by 109.2″.

- μ^{1} Boötis, which has the proper name Alkalurops
- μ^{2} Boötis

Both systems are physically close to each other and have similar proper motions, which at first would suggest they are gravitationally bound, but their abundances of chemical elements are different, confirming that μ^{1} and μ^{2} are separate systems. Instead, they may be a close encounter between two binary systems.

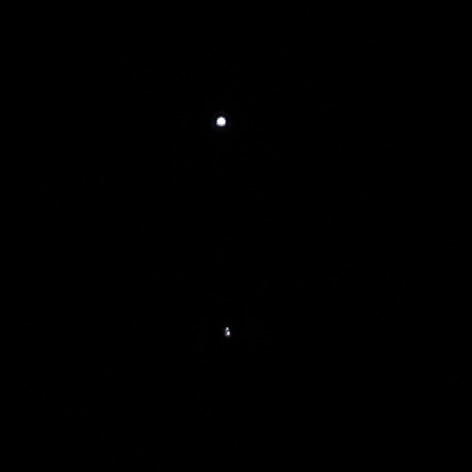
Mu Bootis (Alkalurops) as seen in a small telescope

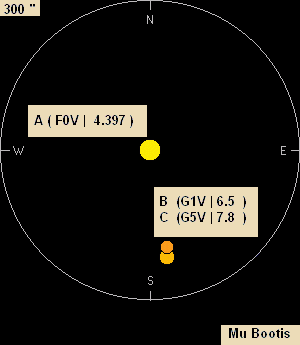
Illustration of Mu^{1,2} Boötis
