= HD 19275 =

Star in the constellation Cassiopeia

- Location of HD 19275 (circled)

Observation data Epoch J2000.0 Equinox ICRS
- Constellation: Cassiopeia
- Right ascension: 03^{h} 11^{m} 56.26916^{s}
- Declination: +74° 23′ 37.1699″
- Apparent magnitude (V): 4.85

Characteristics
- Evolutionary stage: main sequence
- Spectral type: A2Vnn
- U−B color index: +0.05
- B−V color index: +0.035±0.006

Astrometry
Radial velocity (R_{v})	11.9±3.1 km/s
Proper motion (μ)	RA: +14.158 mas/yr Dec.: −86.811 mas/yr
Parallax (π)	19.6409±0.0848 mas
Distance	166.1 ± 0.7 ly (50.9 ± 0.2 pc)
Absolute magnitude (M_{V})	1.32

Details
Mass	1.80+0.32 −0.29 M_{☉}
Radius	2.7 R_{☉}
Luminosity	27.27 L_{☉}
Surface gravity (log g)	4.20±0.25 cgs
Temperature	8,875±1,000 K
Metallicity [Fe/H]	−0.11±0.26 dex
Rotational velocity (v sin i)	250 km/s
Age	71+317 −60 Myr

Other designations
- Shangcheng, BD+73°168, FK5 2222, GC 3759, HD 19275, HIP 14862, HR 932, SAO 4840, GSC 04325-01562

Database references
SIMBAD	data

HD 19275, also named Shangcheng, is a single star in the northern constellation of Cassiopeia. It has a white hue and is faintly visible to the naked eye with an apparent visual magnitude of 4.85. The distance to HD 19275 is 166 light years as determined using parallax measurements. It is drifting further away from the Sun with a radial velocity of around 12 km/s.

This object is an A-type main-sequence star with a stellar classification of A2Vnn. The 'nn' suffix indicates "nebulous" (broad) absorption lines in the spectrum due to rapid rotation. It is spinning with a projected rotational velocity of 250 km/s, which is giving the star an equatorial bulge that is estimated to be 15% larger than the polar radius. The object is an estimated 71 million years old with 1.8 times the mass of the Sun and about 2.7 times the Sun's radius. It is radiating 27 times the luminosity of the Sun from its photosphere at an effective temperature of 8,875 K.

In Chinese astronomy, the seventh star in the right wall of the Purple Forbidden Enclosure is named Shàng Chéng (The Great Imperial Minister, 上丞). Its identification varies across historical sources; it was identified as HD 19275 in an 11th-century star catalog, but as BK Camelopardalis in more recent sources. The IAU Working Group on Star Names approved the name Shangcheng for HD 19275 on 25 December 2025, and it is now so entered in the IAU Catalog of Star Names.
