= HD 42818 =

Suspected binary star system in the constellation Camelopardalis

- Location of HD 42818 (circled in red)

Observation data Epoch J2000 Equinox ICRS
- Constellation: Camelopardalis
- Right ascension: 06^{h} 18^{m} 50.7809^{s}
- Declination: +69° 19′ 11.176″
- Apparent magnitude (V): +4.76

Characteristics
- Evolutionary stage: main sequence
- Spectral type: A0 Vn
- B−V color index: 0.025±0.003

Astrometry
Radial velocity (R_{v})	−7.0±7.4 km/s
Proper motion (μ)	RA: +0.686 mas/yr Dec.: −108.270 mas/yr
Parallax (π)	18.64±0.23 mas
Distance	175 ± 2 ly (53.6 ± 0.7 pc)
Absolute magnitude (M_{V})	+1.11

Details

HD 42818 A
Mass	2.49 M_{☉}
Radius	2.7 R_{☉}
Luminosity	33.83 L_{☉}
Surface gravity (log g)	4.18±0.14 cgs
Temperature	10,834±368 K
Metallicity [Fe/H]	0.3 dex
Rotational velocity (v sin i)	255 km/s
Age	99 Myr

Other designations
- Shangwei, BD+69°371, FK5 234, HD 42818, HIP 29997, HR 2209, SAO 13788

Database references
SIMBAD	data

HD 42818, also named Shangwei, is a suspected astrometric binary star system in the northern circumpolar constellation of Camelopardalis. It is visible to the naked eye with an apparent visual magnitude of +4.76. Based upon an annual parallax shift of 18.64±0.23 mas as seen from Earth's orbit, it is located some 175 light years away. The system appears to be moving closer with a heliocentric radial velocity of −7 km/s. As of 2012, it is estimated that the system will make its closest approach to the Sun in 485,000 years at a distance of around 169.2 ly (51.87 pc).

The visible member, designated component A, is an A-type main-sequence star with a stellar classification of A0 Vn, where the 'n' indicates "nebulous" absorption lines due to rotation. It is spinning rapidly with a projected rotational velocity of 255 km/s (van Belle (2012) lists 325 km/s), giving the star a pronounced equatorial bulge. Although spectral type A stars are not expected to emit X-rays, the coordinates of this star is a source of X-ray emission with a luminosity of 120.4×10^{20} W. This may be coming from a cooler, unseen companion.

The primary has an estimated 2.49 times the mass of the Sun and about 2.7 times the Sun's radius. It is a relatively young star, about 99 million years old. The star is radiating 34 times the Sun's luminosity from its photosphere at an effective temperature of 10,834 K.

In Chinese astronomy, the fifth star in the right wall of the Purple Forbidden Enclosure is named Shàng Wèi (The Great Imperial Guard, 上衛). Its identification has changed many times throughout history; it was identified as HD 42818 in the Yuan dynasty, but as 43 Camelopardalis in more recent sources. The IAU Working Group on Star Names approved the name Shangwei for HD 42818 on 25 December 2025, and it is now so entered in the IAU Catalog of Star Names.
