= USS Giansar =

Cargo ship of the United States Navy

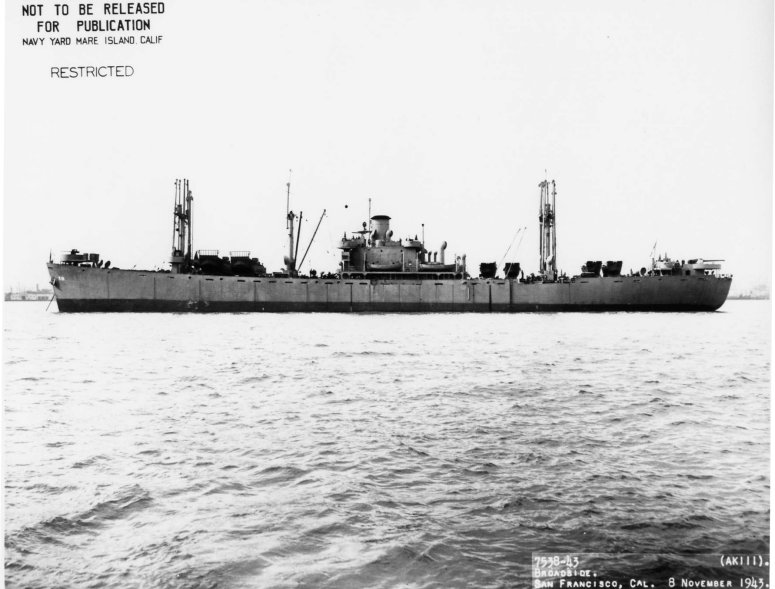
- USS Giansar (AK-111) (broadside view) at anchor off San Francisco, 8 November 1943.

History

United States
- Name: Thomas Ewing; Giansar
- Namesake: Thomas Ewing; Giansar
- Ordered: as a type (EC2-S-C1) hull, MCE hull 625, SS Thomas Ewing
- Builder: Oregon Shipbuilding Corporation, Portland, Oregon
- Laid down: 27 December 1942
- Launched: 19 January 1943
- Sponsored by: Mrs. Harry A. Dick
- Acquired: 5 October 1943
- Commissioned: 29 October 1943
- Decommissioned: 28 November 1945
- Stricken: 19 December 1945
- Identification: Hull symbol:AK-111
- Fate: Sold for scrapping to Bethlehem Steel Corp, 31 July 1961, scrapping completed, 24 April 1963

General characteristics
- Class & type: Crater-class cargo ship
- Displacement: 4,023 long tons (4,088 t) (standard); 14,550 long tons (14,780 t) (full load)
- Length: 441 ft 6 in (134.57 m)
- Beam: 56 ft 11 in (17.35 m)
- Draft: 28 ft 4 in (8.64 m)
- Installed power: 2 × Babcock & Wilcox header-type boilers, 220psi 450°; 2,500 shp (1,900 kW)
- Propulsion: 1 × Iron Fireman triple-expansion reciprocating steam engine; 1 × shaft
- Speed: 12.5 kn (23.2 km/h; 14.4 mph)
- Complement: 254
- Armament: 1 × 5 in (127 mm)/38 caliber dual-purpose (DP) gun; 1 × 3 in (76 mm)/50 caliber DP gun; 2 × 40 mm (1.57 in) Bofors anti-aircraft (AA) gun mounts; 6 × 20 mm (0.79 in) Oerlikon cannon AA gun mounts

USS Giansar (AK-111) was a Crater-class cargo ship originally laid down as the liberty ship SS Thomas Ewing. The ship was taken over by the United States Navy and renamed in 1943. After being decommissioned in 1945, Giansar was returned to the Maritime Commission. She was scrapped in 1963. The ship's original name honored Thomas Ewing, an American politician from Virginia. The name Giansar is a former name of the star λ Draconis in the constellation Draco now spelled Giausar.

Giansar was launched under Maritime Commission contract 19 January 1943 by the Oregon Shipbuilding Corporation in Portland, Oregon. She was sponsored by Mrs. Harry A. Dick and acquired by the US Navy on 5 October 1943. Giansar was commissioned on 29 October 1943.

Giansar sailed from Los Angeles, California 10 November 1943 to deliver aircraft to Pago Pago, Samoa, and general cargo to Funafuti atoll, Ellice Islands. She then proceeded with 500 pound bombs to Namomea in the Gilberts. After transport of landing craft from Apamama to Tarawa, she returned to Pearl Harbor 1 February 1944. She departed 10 February with tanks, guns, trucks and gasoline for Majuro, returning 12 March with more than 125 passengers. She made a similar voyage (13 March – 19 May) carrying general cargo and mail to Majuro and Kwajalein.

Giansar departed Pearl Harbor 21 May 1944 and put in at San Francisco 8 days later with salvaged aviation material and 123 passengers. In a round trip voyage from San Francisco (9 June – 28 September), she transported vehicles, supplies and other cargo to Pearl Harbor, Eniwetok, Saipan and Guam. A similar voyage was made (31 October 1944 – 9 February 1945) for delivery of provisions to Hawaii, Ulithi and Guam. She returned to Los Angeles 9 February with 130 sailors.

Giansar departed Los Angeles on her last logistic cruise 1 March 1945. Proceeding via Hawaii and the Marshalls, she unloaded cargo at Ulithi, thence to San Pedro Bay in the Philippines where she arrived 25 May 1945. She remained there 3 months, discharging foodstuffs, store stock and medical supplies are required. After a voyage to Ulithi and return (13–25 August), she departed San Pedro Bay 28 August for return to Seattle, Washington, 28 September 1945.

Giansar arrived at San Francisco 18 October, departing 2 days later for Norfolk, Virginia. She moored at Hampton Roads, Virginia 8 November and decommissioned at Norfolk 28 November 1945. She was returned to the Maritime Commission in the same day. Her name was struck from the Naval Vessel Register 19 December 1945.
