= Sigma2 Ursae Majoris =

Binary star in the constellation Ursa Major

Sigma^{2} Ursae Majoris
- Location of σ^{2} Ursae Majoris (circled)

Observation data Epoch J2000 Equinox ICRS
- Constellation: Ursa Major
- σ^{2} UMa A
- Right ascension: 09^{h} 10^{m} 23.538^{s}
- Declination: +67° 08′ 02.44″
- Apparent magnitude (V): +4.813
- σ^{2} UMa B
- Right ascension: 09^{h} 10^{m} 23.508^{s}
- Declination: +67° 08′ 06.58″
- Apparent magnitude (V): +10.26

Characteristics
- Spectral type: F6IV-V / K2V
- U−B color index: +0.01
- B−V color index: +0.48
- Variable type: Suspected

Astrometry

σ^{2} UMa A
| Radial velocity (R_{v}) | −2.92 ± 0.12 km/s |
| Proper motion (μ) | RA: 7.1 mas/yr Dec.: −95.1 mas/yr |
| Parallax (π) | 49.07±0.37 mas |
| Distance | 66.5 ± 0.5 ly (20.4 ± 0.2 pc) |
| Absolute bolometric magnitude (M_{bol}) | 3.18 |

σ^{2} UMa B
| Proper motion (μ) | RA: 4.1 mas/yr Dec.: −30.0 mas/yr |
| Absolute magnitude (M_{V}) | 7.16 |

Orbit
| Period (P) | 970±118 yr |
| Semi-major axis (a) | 5.80±0.14″ |
| Eccentricity (e) | 0.801±0.017 |
| Inclination (i) | 145.4±1.5° |
| Longitude of the node (Ω) | 102.1±1.9° |
| Periastron epoch (T) | B 1917.39±0.12 |
| Argument of periastron (ω) (secondary) | 332.4±1.9° |

Details

σ^{2} UMa A
| Mass | 1.31+0.04 −0.05 M_{☉} |
| Radius | 1.70±0.03 R_{☉} |
| Luminosity | 4.31+0.25 −0.23 L_{☉} |
| Surface gravity (log g) | 4.070±0.070 cgs |
| Temperature | 6381+69 −66 K |
| Metallicity [Fe/H] | −0.03±0.07 dex |
| Rotational velocity (v sin i) | 4.1±0.8 km/s |

σ^{2} UMa B
| Mass | ~0.73 M_{☉} |
| Temperature | ~4600 K |

Other designations
- BD+67°577, Gl 335, HD 78154, HIP 45038, HR 3616, SAO 14788
- σ^{2} UMa A: TYC 4141-1496-1
- σ^{2} UMa B: TYC 4141-1496-2

Database references
| SIMBAD | AB |
- A
- B

Sigma^{2} Ursae Majoris (σ^{2} Ursae Majoris, σ^{2} UMa) is a binary star in the constellation of Ursa Major. Parallax measurements made by the Hipparcos spacecraft put it at a distance of about 66.5 light years (20.4 parsecs) from Earth, making this a fairly nearby system. The primary component has an apparent magnitude of about 4.8, meaning it can be seen with the naked eye (see Bortle scale).

This is a visual binary, meaning that the two components can be resolved, and the orbit is derived from the positions of the two stars. The primary component Sigma^{2} Ursae Majoris A, is a white-colored F-type subgiant. Its radius is about 1.70 times that of the Sun, and it is 31% more massive. The companion is an orange K-type main-sequence star that is much fainter. The two stars are separated about 4 arcseconds away, and because of their slow orbital motion the orbit is poorly known: estimates of the orbital period range from 970 years to over 1,500 years. There is a third component, designated Sigma^{2} Ursae Majoris C. Located 205 arcseconds from the primary, it is thought to be a line-of-sight coincidence, and is not related to the system.

== Naming ==
- With π^{1}, π^{2}, σ^{1}, ρ, A and d, it composed the Arabic asterism الظِّبَاء aẓ-Ẓibāʾ meaning the Gazelles. According to the catalogue of stars in the Technical Memorandum 33-507 - A Reduced Star Catalog Containing 537 Named Stars, Al Ṭhibā were the title for seven stars : A as Althiba I, π^{1} as Althiba II, π^{2} as Althiba III, ρ as Althiba IV, σ^{1} as Althiba V, this star (σ^{2}) as Althiba VI, and d as Althiba VII.
- In Chinese, 三師 (Sān Shī), meaning Three Top Instructors, refers to an asterism consisting of σ^{2} Ursae Majoris and ρ Ursae Majoris. Consequently, σ^{2} Ursae Majoris itself is known as 三師三 (Sān Shī sān, English: the Third Star of Three Top Instructors.).
