= Pi1 Ursae Majoris =

Star in the constellation Ursa Major

Pi^{1} Ursae Majoris
- Location of π¹ Ursae Majoris (circled)

Observation data Epoch J2000 Equinox ICRS
- Constellation: Ursa Major
- Right ascension: 08^{h} 39^{m} 11.70461^{s}
- Declination: +65° 01′ 15.2631″
- Apparent magnitude (V): 5.63

Characteristics
- Evolutionary stage: main sequence
- Spectral type: G1.5Vb
- U−B color index: +0.07
- B−V color index: +0.62
- Variable type: BY Draconis

Astrometry
Radial velocity (R_{v})	−13.88±0.47 km/s
Proper motion (μ)	RA: −27.274±0.024 mas/yr Dec.: +88.881±0.049 mas/yr
Parallax (π)	69.2576±0.0485 mas
Distance	47.09 ± 0.03 ly (14.44 ± 0.01 pc)
Absolute magnitude (M_{V})	4.84

Details
Mass	0.90 M_{☉}
Luminosity	0.97 L_{☉}
Surface gravity (log g)	4.48 cgs
Temperature	5,884±6.8 K
Metallicity [Fe/H]	–0.04 dex
Rotation	5 days
Rotational velocity (v sin i)	14.27 km/s
Age	200 Myr

Other designations
- π^{1} UMa, 3 UMa, BD+65 643, GC 11817, GJ 311, HD 72905, HIP 42438, HR 3391, SAO 14609, PPM 16705

Database references
SIMBAD	data

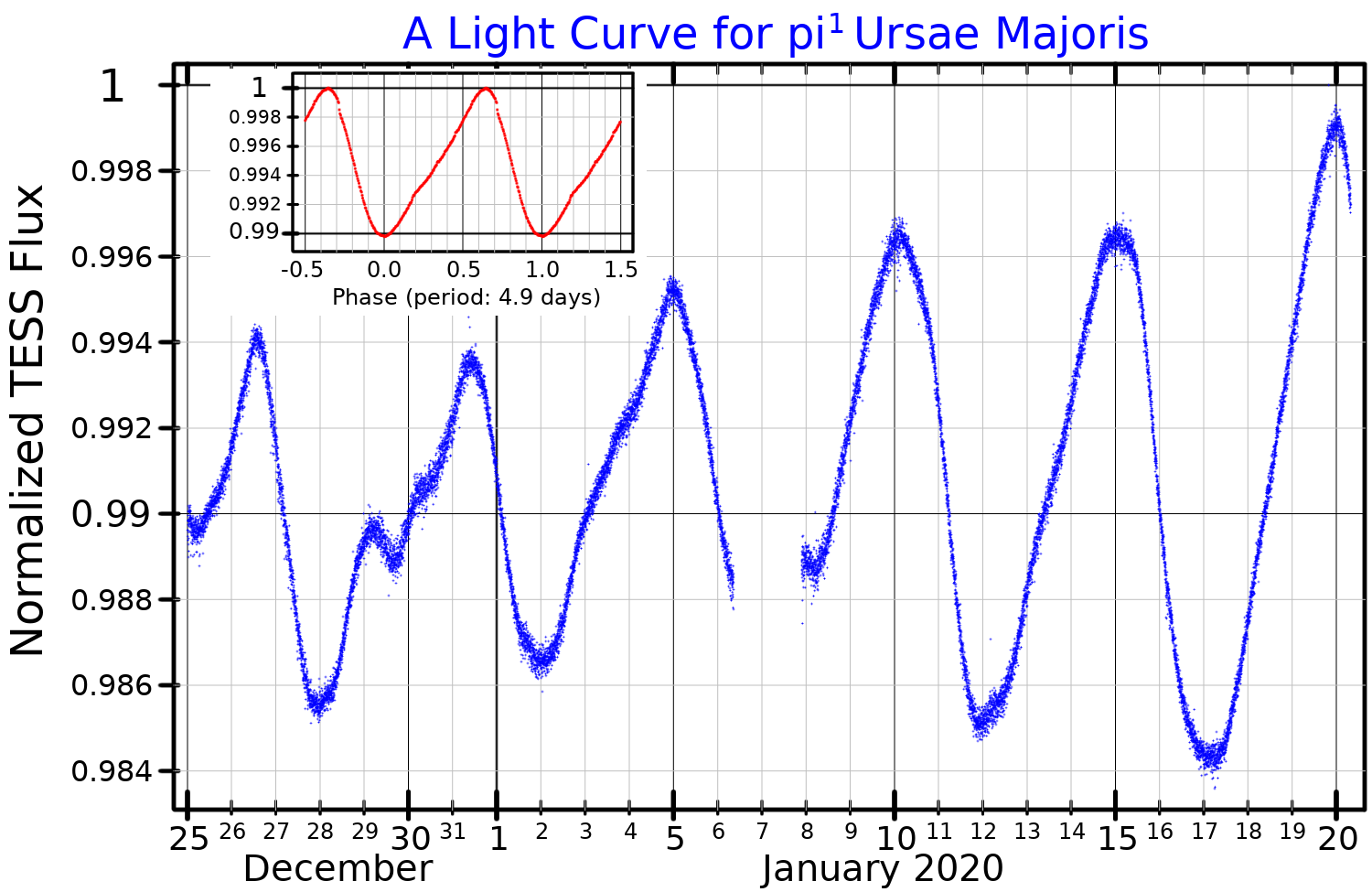
A light curve for pi^{1} Ursae Majoris, plotted from TESS data. The main plot shows the variation over several weeks, and the inset plot shows the same data folded, assuming a 4.9 day period, and averaged into 250 phase bins.

Pi^{1} Ursae Majoris (Pi^{1} UMa, π^{1} Ursae Majoris, π^{1} UMa) is a yellow G-type main sequence dwarf with a mean apparent magnitude of +5.63. It is approximately 47.1 light years from Earth, and is a relatively young star with an age of about 200 million years. It is classified as a BY Draconis type variable star and its brightness varies by 0.08 magnitudes. In 1986, it became the first solar-type star to have the emission from an X-ray flare observed. Based upon its space velocity components, this star is a member of the Ursa Major moving group of stars that share a common motion through space.

An excess of infrared radiation has been detected from this system, which suggests the presence of a debris disk. The best fit to the data indicates that there is a ring of fine debris out to a radius of about 0.4 AU, consisting of 0.25 μm grains of amorphous silicates or crystalline forsterite. There may also be a wider ring of larger (10 μm) grains out to a distance of 16 AU.

== Naming and etymology ==
With π^{2}, σ^{1}, σ^{2}, ρ, A and d, it composed the Arabic asterism Al Ṭhibā᾽, the Gazelle. According to the catalogue of stars in the Technical Memorandum 33-507 - A Reduced Star Catalog Containing 537 Named Stars, Al Ṭhibā were the title for seven stars : A as Althiba I, this star (π^{1}) as Althiba II, π^{2} as Althiba III, ρ as Althiba IV, σ^{1} as Althiba V, σ^{2} as Althiba VI, and d as Althiba VII.
