= 4 Ursae Majoris =

Star in the constellation Ursa Major

Pi^{2} Ursae Majoris
- Location of π^{2} Ursae Majoris (circled) near the center

Observation data Epoch J2000.0 Equinox ICRS
- Constellation: Ursa Major
- Right ascension: 08^{h} 40^{m} 12.8172^{s}
- Declination: +64° 19′ 40.570″
- Apparent magnitude (V): +4.620

Characteristics
- Evolutionary stage: red giant branch
- Spectral type: K2 III
- U−B color index: +1.193
- B−V color index: +1.159

Astrometry
Radial velocity (R_{v})	+14.62 km/s
Proper motion (μ)	RA: −59.861(80) mas/yr Dec.: 26.544(88) mas/yr
Parallax (π)	13.2035±0.1164 mas
Distance	247 ± 2 ly (75.7 ± 0.7 pc)
Absolute magnitude (M_{V})	0.150

Details
Mass	1.234 ± 0.15 M_{☉}
Radius	18.79±0.38 R_{☉}
Luminosity	112.4±10.0 L_{☉}
Surface gravity (log g)	1.8 ± 0.15 cgs
Temperature	4336±99 K
Metallicity [Fe/H]	-0.25 ± 0.04 dex
Rotational velocity (v sin i)	8 km/s
Age	4.18 ± 1.95 Gyr

Other designations
- π^{2} Ursae Majoris, π^{2} UMa, Pi^{2} UMa, 4 Ursae Majoris, BD+64°698, FK5 2677, GC 11850, HD 73108, HIP 42527, HR 3403, PPM 16713, SAO 14616

Database references
SIMBAD	data

4 Ursae Majoris (sometimes abbreviated 4 UMa) is the Flamsteed designation of a star in the northern circumpolar constellation of Ursa Major. It also bears the Bayer designation of Pi^{2} Ursae Majoris (Pi^{2} UMa, π^{2} Ursae Majoris, π^{2} UMa) and is traditionally named Muscida. With an apparent visual magnitude of +4.6, this star is visible from suburban or darker skies based upon the Bortle Dark-Sky Scale. From parallax measurements made during the Gaia mission, this star is at a distance of 247 light-years (76 parsecs) from Earth. As of 2011, one extrasolar planet has been confirmed to be orbiting the star.

== Properties ==
This star has a stellar classification of K2 III, indicating that, at an estimated age of around four billion years, it is an evolved star that has reached the giant stage. It has a mass about 1.2 times larger than the Sun, but has expanded to 18 times the Sun's girth. The effective temperature of the star's outer atmosphere is 4,415 K. This heat gives it the cool, orange-hued glow of a K-type star.

Pi^{2} Ursae Majoris is a member of the Milky Way galaxy's thin disk population. It is following an orbit through the galaxy with an eccentricity of 0.10, which carries it as close to the Galactic Center as 27.7 kilolight-years (8.5 kiloparsecs) and as far as 34.1 kly (10.5 kpc). The inclination of this orbit lies close to the galactic plane, so it departs this plane by no more than 260 ly (80 pc).

== Planetary system ==
Based upon observed radial velocity changes in the star, in 2007 the presence of a planetary companion was announced. The planet, designated 4 Ursae Majoris b, is at least seven times more massive than Jupiter. Its orbit is eccentric, orbiting 4 Ursae Majoris at 87% the distance from Sun to Earth. Compared to the Sun, this star has a lower abundance of elements other than hydrogen and helium, what astronomers term the star's metallicity. This is curious, because most main-sequence stars with planets tend to have a higher abundance of metals.

The 4 Ursae Majoris planetary system
Companion (in order from star)	Mass	Semimajor axis (AU)	Orbital period (days)	Eccentricity	Inclination (°)	Radius
b	>6.980+0.031 −0.030 M_{J}	0.87189+0.00059 −0.00062	268.1±0.3	0.440±0.003	—	—

== Naming and etymology ==
With π^{1}, σ^{1}, σ^{2}, ρ, A and d, it composed the Arabic asterism Al Ṭhibā᾽, the Gazelle. According to the catalogue of stars in the Technical Memorandum 33-507 - A Reduced Star Catalog Containing 537 Named Stars, Al Ṭhibā were the title for seven stars: A as Althiba I, π^{1} as Althiba II, this star (π^{2}) as Althiba III, ρ as Althiba IV, σ^{1} as Althiba V, σ^{2} as Althiba VI, and d as Althiba VII.

== See also ==
- 47 Ursae Majoris
- Omicron Ursae Majoris
