= Gamma Camelopardalis =

Star in the constellation Camelopardalis

- Location of γ Cam (circled)

Observation data Epoch J2000.0 Equinox J2000.0 (ICRS)
- Constellation: Camelopardalis
- Right ascension: 03^{h} 50^{m} 21.509^{s}
- Declination: +71° 19′ 56.16″
- Apparent magnitude (V): 4.66 + 9.07

Characteristics
- Spectral type: A2 IVn
- U−B color index: +0.07
- B−V color index: +0.03

Astrometry
Radial velocity (R_{v})	−2.84±0.28 km/s
Proper motion (μ)	RA: +18.435 mas/yr Dec.: −41.956 mas/yr
Parallax (π)	8.4446±0.0826 mas
Distance	386 ± 4 ly (118 ± 1 pc)
Absolute magnitude (M_{V})	−0.62

Details

γ Cam A
Mass	3.40±0.17 M_{☉}
Radius	5.55±0.28 R_{☉}
Luminosity	185 L_{☉}
Surface gravity (log g)	3.70±0.01 cgs
Temperature	8,892 K
Rotational velocity (v sin i)	205 km/s

Other designations
- Shaowei, γ Cam, BD+70°259, FK5 138, GC 4557, HD 23401, HIP 17959, HR 1148, SAO 5006, CCDM 03504+7120, WDS J03504+7120A

Database references
SIMBAD	data

Gamma Camelopardalis, also named Shaowei, is a suspected wide binary star system in the northern circumpolar constellation of Camelopardalis. Its name is a Bayer designation that is Latinized from γ Camelopardalis, and abbreviated Gamma Cam or γ Cam. With a visual magnitude of 4.66, it is faintly visible to the naked eye. Based upon an annual parallax shift of 9.09 mas as seen from Earth, this system is located about 386 light-years (118 pc) from the Sun. It is drifting closer with a line of sight velocity of −2.8 km/s.

The brighter primary, designated component A, is a white-hued A-type subgiant star with a stellar classification of A2 IVn. It is spinning rapidly with a projected rotational velocity of 205 km/s. This is giving the star an oblate shape with an equatorial bulge that is 17% larger than the polar radius. It has about 3.4 times the mass of the Sun and 5.6 times the Sun's radius. The star is radiating 185 times the Sun's luminosity from its photosphere at an effective temperature of 8,892 K.

The magnitude 9.07 secondary, BD+70 260, designated component C, lies at an angular separation of 106.00 arc seconds along a position angle of 85°, as of 2011. Component B is a magnitude 12.40 visual companion at a separation of 56.30 arc seconds along position angle 247°.

In Chinese astronomy, the sixth star in the right wall of the Purple Forbidden Enclosure is named Shào Wèi (The Second Imperial Guard, 少衛). While its identification varies across historical sources, it is consistently in Camelopardalis; it was identified as γ Camelopardalis in the Yuan dynasty, but as α Camelopardalis in more recent sources. The IAU Working Group on Star Names approved the name Shaowei for γ Camelopardalis A on 25 December 2025, and it is now so entered in the IAU Catalog of Star Names.
