= Mu2 Boötis =

Binary star system in the northern constellation of Boötes

Mu^{2} Boötis
- Location of μ^{2} Boötis (circled)

Observation data Epoch J2000 Equinox ICRS
- Constellation: Boötes
- A
- Right ascension: 15^{h} 24^{m} 30.86726^{s}
- Declination: +37° 20′ 50.2761″
- Apparent magnitude (V): 6.98
- B
- Right ascension: 15^{h} 24^{m} 30.89704^{s}
- Declination: +37° 20′ 52.5550″
- Apparent magnitude (V): 7.63

Characteristics
- Evolutionary stage: main sequence
- Spectral type: F9V + G0V
- U−B color index: +0.13
- B−V color index: +0.59

Astrometry

A
Proper motion (μ)	RA: −139.142 mas/yr Dec.: +90.281 mas/yr
Parallax (π)	27.2223±0.0168 mas
Distance	119.81 ± 0.07 ly (36.73 ± 0.02 pc)

B
Proper motion (μ)	RA: −152.149 mas/yr Dec.: +89.593 mas/yr
Parallax (π)	27.2126±0.0181 mas
Distance	119.85 ± 0.08 ly (36.75 ± 0.02 pc)

Orbit
Primary	A
Name	B
Period (P)	265 yr
Semi-major axis (a)	1.46″
Eccentricity (e)	0.585
Inclination (i)	135.5°
Longitude of the node (Ω)	174°
Periastron epoch (T)	1864.9
Argument of periastron (ω) (secondary)	338°

Details

A
Mass	1.24 M_{☉}
Radius	1.23 R_{☉}
Luminosity	1.75 L_{☉}
Surface gravity (log g)	4.3 cgs
Temperature	6,000 K
Rotational velocity (v sin i)	5 km/s
Age	5.6 Gyr

B
Mass	1.05 M_{☉}
Radius	1.09 R_{☉}
Luminosity	1.06 L_{☉}
Surface gravity (log g)	4.4 cgs
Temperature	5,900 K
Rotational velocity (v sin i)	9 km/s
Age	11.3 Gyr

Other designations
- 51 Boo B, BD+37°2637, GC 20725, GJ 3904, HD 137392, HIP 75415, HR 5734, SAO 64687

Database references
SIMBAD	data

Mu^{2} Boötis is a binary star in the northern constellation of Boötes. Its name is a Bayer designation that is Latinized from μ^{2} Boötis, and abbreviated Mu^{2} Boo or μ^{2} Boo. Based on parallax measurements, these stars are located at a distance of approximately 120 light-years from the Sun.

The components of μ^{2} Boötis have apparent magnitudes of +7.0 and +7.6. They have similar spectral types, F9V and G0V respectively, and complete one orbit about their common centre of mass every 260 years.

The system μ^{1} Boötis is at a similar distance and share similar proper motions with μ^{2}, but has a significantly different chemical composition, so they are not gravitationally bound.
