= Beta Camelopardalis =

Star in the constellation Camelopardalis

β Camelopardalis
- Location of β Cam (circled)

Observation data Epoch J2000 Equinox ICRS
- Constellation: Camelopardalis
- Right ascension: 05^{h} 03^{m} 25.091^{s}
- Declination: +60° 26′ 32.08″
- Apparent magnitude (V): 4.02

Characteristics
- Spectral type: G1Ib–IIa
- U−B color index: +0.62
- B−V color index: +0.93
- R−I color index: +0.49

Astrometry
Radial velocity (R_{v})	−1.90 km/s
Proper motion (μ)	RA: −5.561 mas/yr Dec.: −14.400 mas/yr
Parallax (π)	3.8800±0.1635 mas
Distance	840 ± 40 ly (260 ± 10 pc)
Absolute magnitude (M_{V})	−3.1

Details
Mass	6.5 M_{☉}
Radius	58±13 R_{☉}
Luminosity	1,592 L_{☉}
Surface gravity (log g)	1.79 cgs
Temperature	5,300 K
Metallicity [Fe/H]	−0.06 dex
Rotational velocity (v sin i)	11.7 km/s
Age	53 Myr

Other designations
- β Cam, 10 Camelopardalis, 10 Cam, BD+60°856, FK5 182, GC 6136, HD 31910, HIP 23522, HR 1603, SAO 13351, ADS 3615 A, WDS J05034+6027

Database references
SIMBAD	data

Data sources:

Hipparcos Catalogue, CCDM (2002), Bright Star Catalogue (5th rev. ed.)

Beta Camelopardalis is the brightest star in the northern constellation of Camelopardalis. Its name is a Bayer designation that is Latinised from β Camelopardalis, and abbreviated Beta Cam or β Cam. This star is bright enough to be faintly visible to the naked eye, having an apparent visual magnitude of 4.02. Based upon an annual parallax shift of 3.74 mas as seen from Earth, it is located at a distance of approximately 840 light-years (260 pc) from the Sun. It is moving closer with a radial velocity of −1.90 km/s and is most likely a single star.

This is a yellow-hued G-type supergiant/bright giant with a stellar classification of G1 Ib–IIa. It is an estimated 60 million years old and is spinning with a projected rotational velocity of 11.7 km/s. This is an unusually high rate of rotation for an evolved star of this type. One possible explanation is that it may have engulfed a nearby giant planet, such as a hot Jupiter.

Beta Camelopardalis has 6.5 times the mass of the Sun and has expanded to around 58 the Sun's radius. The star is radiating 1,592 times the Sun's luminosity from its enlarged photosphere at an effective temperature of 5,300 K. It is a source of X-ray emission.

β Cam has two visual companions: a 7th-magnitude A5-class star at an angular separation of 84 arcseconds; and a 12th-magnitude star at 15 arcseconds.
