= Chi Herculis =

Sun-like star in the constellation Hercules

- Location of χ Herculis (circled in red)

Observation data Epoch J2000.0 Equinox J2000.0 (ICRS)
- Constellation: Hercules
- Right ascension: 15^{h} 52^{m} 40.54105^{s}
- Declination: +42° 27′ 05.4629″
- Apparent magnitude (V): 4.59

Characteristics
- Spectral type: G0V Fe-0.8 CH-0.5
- U−B color index: +0.01
- B−V color index: +0.57

Astrometry
Radial velocity (R_{v})	−55.99±0.12 km/s
Proper motion (μ)	RA: +448.839 mas/yr Dec.: +629.541 mas/yr
Parallax (π)	62.0928±0.0807 mas
Distance	52.53 ± 0.07 ly (16.10 ± 0.02 pc)
Absolute magnitude (M_{V})	+3.59

Orbit
Period (P)	51.2865±0.4082 d
Semi-major axis (a)	0.96±0.58″
Eccentricity (e)	0.0000
Inclination (i)	131.68±27.61°
Longitude of the node (Ω)	51.69±37.96°
Periastron epoch (T)	48349.0039±4.4425
Argument of periastron (ω) (secondary)	0.00°

Details
Mass	0.94±0.03 M_{☉}
Radius	1.79+0.04 −0.03 R_{☉}
Luminosity	3.30±0.18 L_{☉}
Surface gravity (log g)	4.060±0.040 cgs
Temperature	5,813+49 −56 K
Metallicity [Fe/H]	−0.45 dex
Rotational velocity (v sin i)	2.4 km/s
Age	9.18+0.65 −0.55 Gyr

Other designations
- χ Her, 1 Her, BD+42°2648, FK5 1166, GJ 602, HD 142373, HIP 77760, HR 5914, SAO 45772, WDS J16254+1402AB

Database references
SIMBAD	data

Chi Herculis, Latinized from χ Herculis, is a Sun-like star in the northern constellation of Hercules. Based upon an annual parallax shift of 62.1 mas as seen from Earth, it is located 52.5 light years from the Sun. The star is faintly visible to the naked eye with an apparent visual magnitude of 4.59. It has a relatively high proper motion, showing a transverse movement of 0.769 arc seconds per year and is drifting closer to the Sun with a radial velocity of −56 km/s.

This is a suspected binary star system for which orbital elements have been published, listing a circular orbit with period of 51.3 days. However, sources do not confirm this and so the binarity remains in doubt. The observable component is a G-type main sequence star with a stellar classification of G0V Fe-0.8 CH-0.5, indicating abnormal deficiencies in iron and the CH molecule. The surface magnetic activity for this star is distinctly lower than the typical level for regular stars, and hence it is considered a good candidate for being in a Maunder minimum phase.

Chi Herculis is an older star with an estimated age of 7.4 billion years and is spinning with a projected rotational velocity of 2.4. It has 0.94 times the mass of the Sun and 1.79 times the Sun's radius. The star's photosphere is radiating 3.3 times the Sun's luminosity at an effective temperature of 5,813 K. Chi Herculis has been examined for the presence of an infrared excess that could indicate an orbiting debris disk, but none was found. The low metal content and a relatively high velocity of 80 kilometers per second suggest that the star is a visitor from another part of the Galaxy, and is just moving through the local neighborhood.
