= 42 Herculis =

Red giant star in the constellation Hercules

- Location of 42 Herculis (circled in red)

Observation data Epoch J2000 Equinox ICRS
- Constellation: Hercules
- Right ascension: 16^{h} 38^{m} 44.84465^{s}
- Declination: +48° 55′ 42.0160″
- Apparent magnitude (V): 4.86

Characteristics
- Evolutionary stage: asymptotic giant branch
- Spectral type: M2.5III
- B−V color index: 1.562±0.011

Astrometry
Radial velocity (R_{v})	−55.74±0.33 km/s
Proper motion (μ)	RA: −47.768 mas/yr Dec.: +27.349 mas/yr
Parallax (π)	7.2737±0.1764 mas
Distance	450 ± 10 ly (137 ± 3 pc)
Absolute magnitude (M_{V})	−0.65

Details
Mass	1.10 M_{☉}
Radius	61 R_{☉}
Luminosity	682 L_{☉}
Surface gravity (log g)	1.77 cgs
Temperature	3,878 K
Metallicity [Fe/H]	−0.09 dex

Other designations
- 42 Her, NSV 7896, AAVSO 1636+49, BD+49°2531, FK5 1434, HD 150450, HIP 81497, HR 6200, SAO 46210, WDS J16387+4856

Database references
SIMBAD	data

42 Herculis is a single star located around 450 light years away from the Sun in the northern constellation of Hercules. It is visible to the naked eye as a faint, red-hued star with an apparent visual magnitude of 4.86. The star is moving closer to the Earth with a heliocentric radial velocity of −56 km/s.

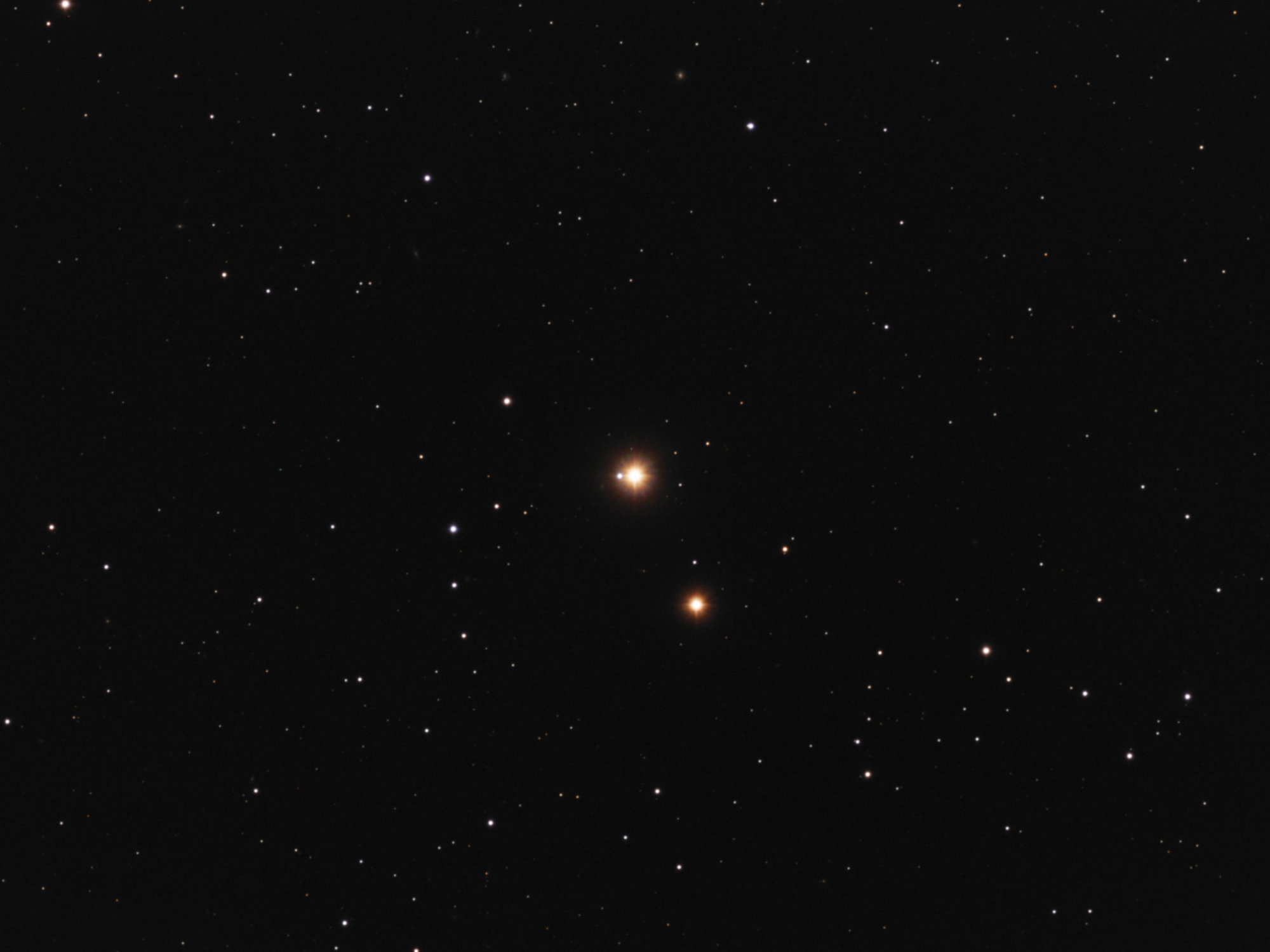
42 Herculis in optical light

This is an aging red giant star on the asymptotic giant branch with a stellar classification of M2.5III. It has been catalogued as a suspected variable star, although a 1992 photometric survey found the brightness to be constant. Having exhausted the supply of hydrogen at its core, the star has expanded to 61 times the Sun's radius. It is radiating 682 times the luminosity of the Sun from its swollen photosphere at an effective temperature of 3,878 K.

There is an unknown source of X-ray and far ultraviolet emission originating from a location offset by more than one arcsecond from the star. This may indicate there is an undetected main sequence companion.
