= Phi Herculis =

Star in the constellation Hercules

- Location of φ Herculis (circled in red)

Observation data Epoch J2000.0 Equinox J2000.0 (ICRS)
- Constellation: Hercules
- Right ascension: 16^{h} 08^{m} 46.17745^{s}
- Declination: +44° 56′ 05.6663″
- Apparent magnitude (V): 4.24

Characteristics
- Spectral type: B9VspHgMn + A8V
- U−B color index: −0.23
- B−V color index: −0.06
- Variable type: α^{2} CVn?

Astrometry
Radial velocity (R_{v})	−16.3±0.4 km/s
Proper motion (μ)	RA: −26.63 mas/yr Dec.: +36.76 mas/yr
Parallax (π)	15.99±0.45 mas
Distance	204 ± 6 ly (63 ± 2 pc)
Absolute magnitude (M_{V})	A: 0.100 ± 0.059; B: 2.670 ± 0.074

Orbit
Period (P)	564.834±0.038 d
Semi-major axis (a)	32.027±0.028 mas
Eccentricity (e)	0.52614±0.00086
Inclination (i)	9.1±0.4°
Longitude of the node (Ω)	190.4±1.4°
Periastron epoch (T)	2450121.43 ± 0.20 JD
Argument of periastron (ω) (secondary)	350.3±1.4°
Semi-amplitude (K_{1}) (primary)	2.772±0.073 km/s
Semi-amplitude (K_{2}) (secondary)	8.1 km/s

Details

φ Her A
Mass	3.05±0.24 M_{☉}
Luminosity	72 L_{☉}
Surface gravity (log g)	4.05±0.15 cgs
Temperature	11,525±150 K
Metallicity [Fe/H]	−0.03 dex
Rotational velocity (v sin i)	8.0±1.0 km/s
Age	210 Myr

φ Her B
Mass	1.614±0.066 M_{☉}
Surface gravity (log g)	4.30±0.15 cgs
Temperature	8,000±150 K
Rotational velocity (v sin i)	50.0±3.0 km/s

Other designations
- φ Her, 11 Her, BD+45°2376, FK5 601, HD 145389, HIP 79101, HR 6023, SAO 45911.

Database references
SIMBAD	data

Phi Herculis (φ Her) is a binary star system in the northern constellation of Hercules. Based upon an annual parallax shift of 15.99 mas as seen from Earth, it is located around 204 light years from the Sun. With a combined apparent visual magnitude of 4.24, it is bright enough to be seen with the naked eye.

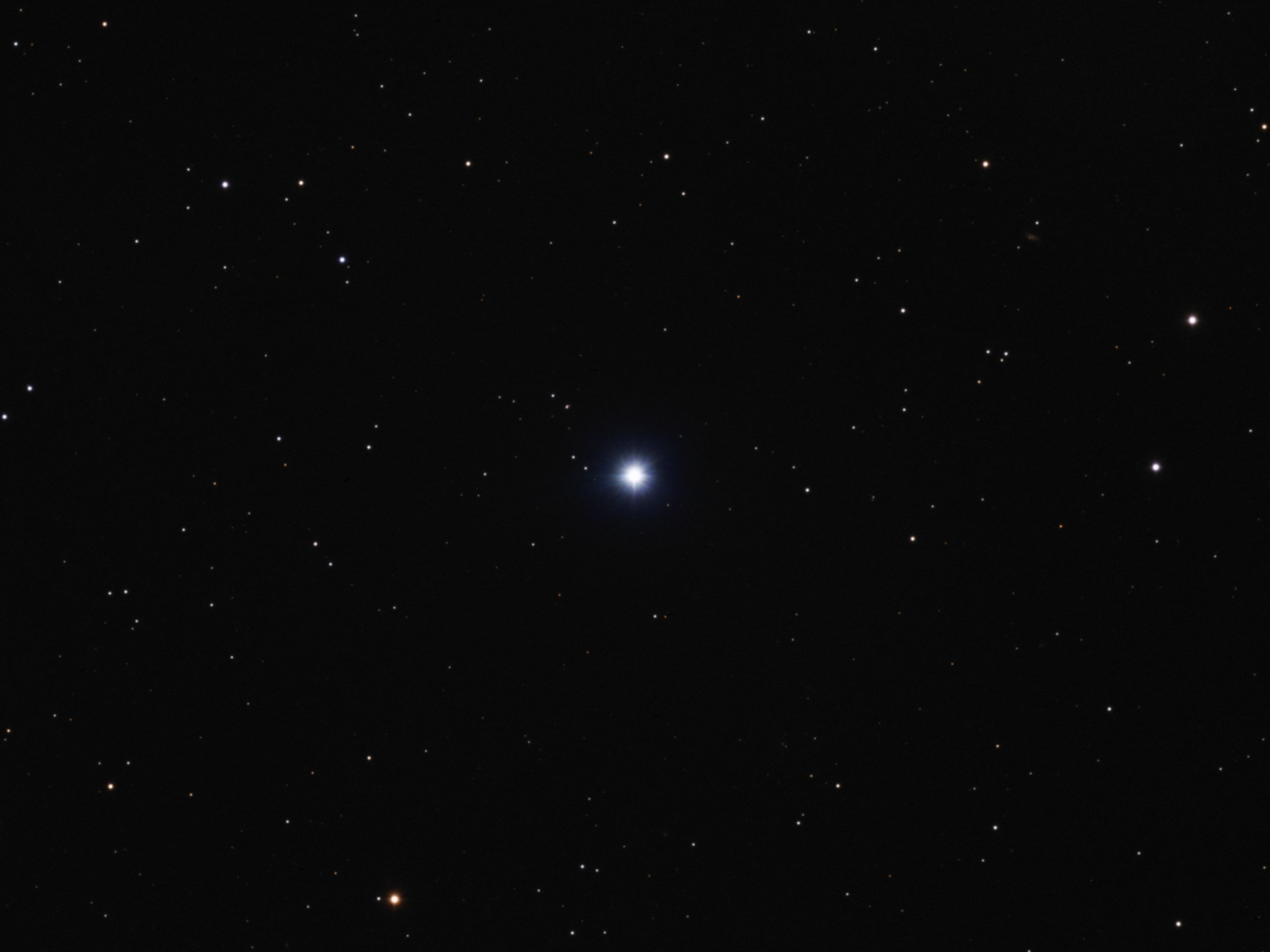
φ Herculis in optical light

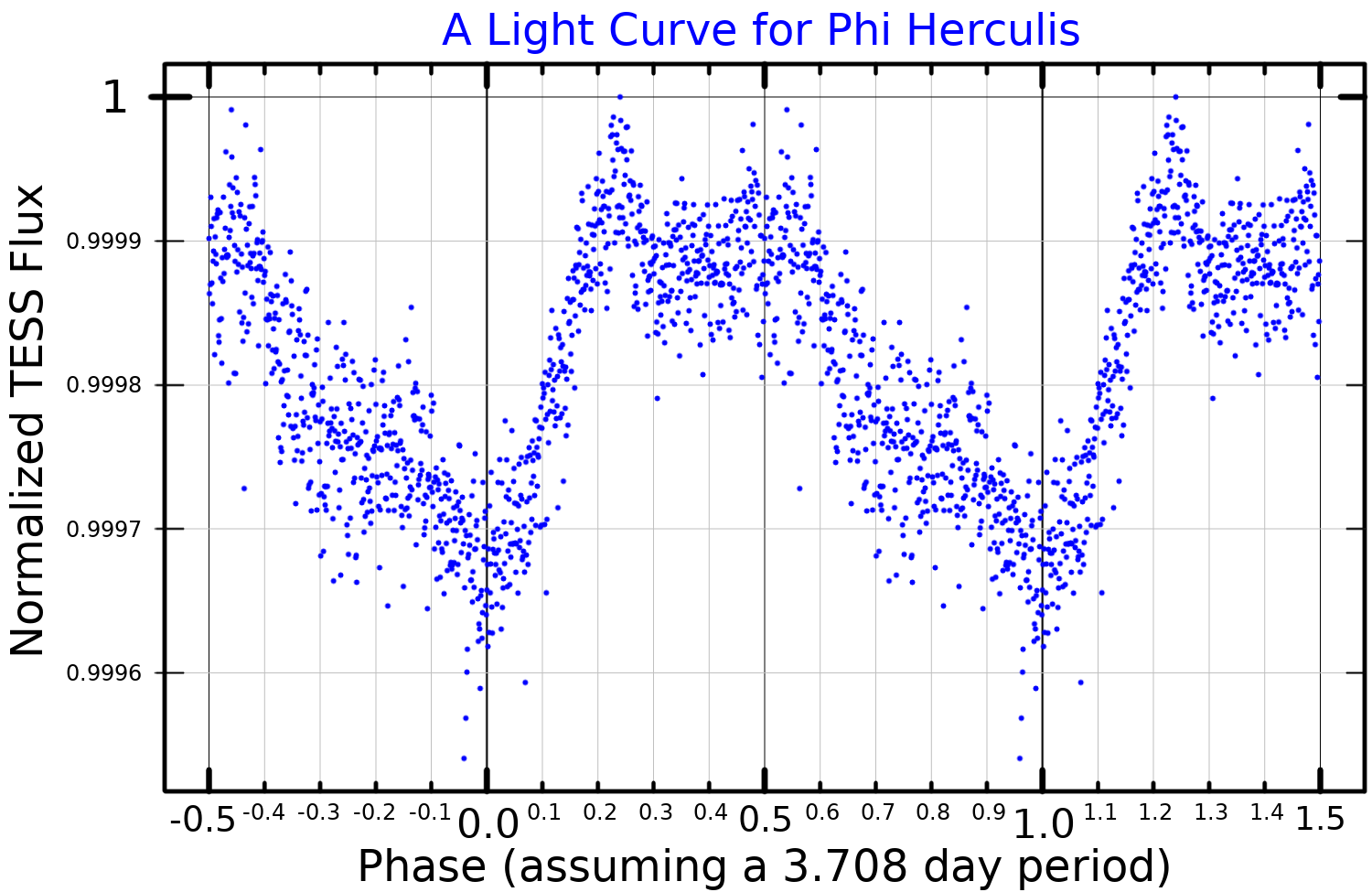
A light curve for Phi Herculis, assuming a 3.708 day period, plotted from TESS data

This is a single-lined spectroscopic binary star system with an orbital period of 564.8 days and an eccentricity of 0.526. The primary, component A, is a B-type main sequence star with a stellar classification of B9VspHgMn. It is a chemically peculiar star of the type called a mercury-manganese star. The star is tentatively catalogued as an Alpha2 Canum Venaticorum variable, with brightness variations of just 0.01 magnitudes.

The secondary, component B, was first separated via interferometry in 2004. It is an A-type main sequence star of class A8V. The magnitude difference between the two components is 2.64.
