= Mu1 Boötis =

Binary star in the northern constellation of Boötes

Mu^{1} Boötis
- Location of μ^{1} Boötis (circled)

Observation data Epoch J2000 Equinox ICRS
- Constellation: Boötes
- Right ascension: 15^{h} 24^{m} 29.43147^{s}
- Declination: +37° 22′ 37.7613″
- Apparent magnitude (V): 4.31

Characteristics
- Spectral type: F2IV
- U−B color index: +0.06
- B−V color index: +0.31
- R−I color index: 0.15

Astrometry
Radial velocity (R_{v})	−8.60±0.3 km/s
Proper motion (μ)	RA: −149.928 mas/yr Dec.: +89.573 mas/yr
Parallax (π)	26.5759±0.7871 mas
Distance	123 ± 4 ly (38 ± 1 pc)
Absolute magnitude (M_{V})	1.47

Orbit
Primary	Aa
Name	Ab
Period (P)	3.75 years
Semi-major axis (a)	0.099″
Eccentricity (e)	0.270
Inclination (i)	129.7°
Longitude of the node (Ω)	129.4°
Periastron epoch (T)	1006.33
Argument of periastron (ω) (secondary)	43.5°

Details

Aa
Mass	1.6 M_{☉}
Radius	1.9 R_{☉}
Luminosity	20 L_{☉}
Surface gravity (log g)	3.4 cgs
Temperature	7,000 K
Rotational velocity (v sin i)	89 km/s

Ab
Mass	1.5 M_{☉}
Surface gravity (log g)	3.6 cgs
Temperature	7,000 K
Rotational velocity (v sin i)	40 km/s

Other designations
- Alkalurops, Inkalunis, Icalurus, Clava, Venabulum, μ Boo, 51 Boötis A, BD+37°2636, FK5 568, GC 20724, GJ 3903, HD 137391, HIP 75411, HR 5733, SAO 64686, ADS 9626, CCDM 15245+3722

Database references
SIMBAD	data

Mu^{1} Boötis is a binary star in the northern constellation of Boötes. Its name is a Bayer designation that is Latinized from μ^{1} Boötis, and abbreviated Mu^{1} Boo or μ^{1} Boo. This system had the traditional name Alkalurops, pronounced /ælkəˈljʊərɒps/. Based on parallax measurements, the system is located at a distance of 123 light-years.

The components of the system have an angular separation of 0.10″. They form a spectroscopic binary system with an orbital period of 3.75 years. The visible component is a yellow-white F-type subgiant with an apparent magnitude of +4.31.

The system μ^{2} Boötis, separated by 109", makes an optical double with μ^{1}, and even has a similar distance from Earth and comparable proper motions, but has a substantially different metallicity, and therefore is not a gravitationally bound companion.

== Nomenclature ==
μ^{1} Boötis (Latinised to Mu^{1} Boötis) is the star's Bayer designation.

The system's traditional name Alkalurops is from the Greek καλαύροψ kalaurops "a herdsman's crook or staff", with the Arabic prefix attached. It has also been known as Inkalunis (from the Alfonsine tables), Clava (Latin 'the club') and Venabulum (Latin 'a hunting spear'). In 2016, the International Astronomical Union organized a Working Group on Star Names (WGSN) to catalogue and standardize proper names for stars. The WGSN approved the name Alkalurops for μ^{1} Boötis on 21 August 2016 and it is now so entered in the IAU Catalog of Star Names.

It is known as 七公六, Qī Gōng liù (the Sixth Star of the Seven Excellencies) in Chinese.

== Gallery ==
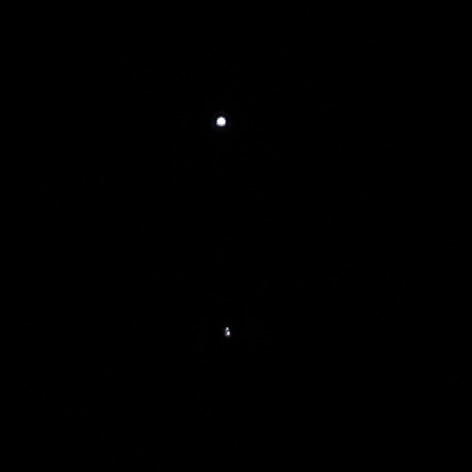
Mu Bootis (Alkalurops) as seen in a small telescope

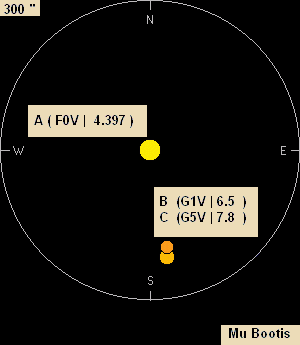
Illustration of Mu^{1,2} Boötis
