= 24 Ursae Majoris =

Star in the constellation Ursa Major

- Location of 24 Ursae Majoris (circled in red)

Observation data Epoch J2000 Equinox ICRS
- Constellation: Ursa Major
- Right ascension: 09^{h} 34^{m} 28.86947^{s}
- Declination: +69° 49′ 49.2265″
- Apparent magnitude (V): 4.54

Characteristics
- Evolutionary stage: subgiant
- Spectral type: G4 III-IV
- B−V color index: 0.781±0.011
- Variable type: RS CVn

Astrometry
Radial velocity (R_{v})	−27.0±0.2 km/s
Proper motion (μ)	RA: −64.043 mas/yr Dec.: +77.209 mas/yr
Parallax (π)	31.1546±0.1208 mas
Distance	104.7 ± 0.4 ly (32.1 ± 0.1 pc)
Absolute magnitude (M_{V})	2.16±0.013

Details
Mass	1.9 M_{☉}
Radius	4.6 R_{☉}
Luminosity	14.9 L_{☉}
Surface gravity (log g)	3.44 cgs
Temperature	5,335 K
Metallicity [Fe/H]	−0.19 dex
Rotation	10 d
Rotational velocity (v sin i)	5.5 km/s
Age	1.0±0.1 Gyr

Other designations
- d UMa, 24 UMa, DK UMa, AAVSO 0925+70, BD+70°565, FK5 357, HD 82210, HIP 46977, HR 3771, SAO 6897

Database references
SIMBAD	data

24 Ursae Majoris is a variable star in the northern circumpolar constellation of Ursa Major, located 104.7 light-years from the Sun. It has the variable star designation DK Ursae Majoris and the Bayer designation d Ursae Majoris; 24 Ursae Majoris is the Flamsteed designation. This object is visible to the naked eye as a faint, yellow-hued star with an apparent visual magnitude of 4.54. It is moving closer to the Earth with a heliocentric radial velocity of −27 km/s, and is expected to come as close as 51 light-years in around 879,000 years.

== Description ==
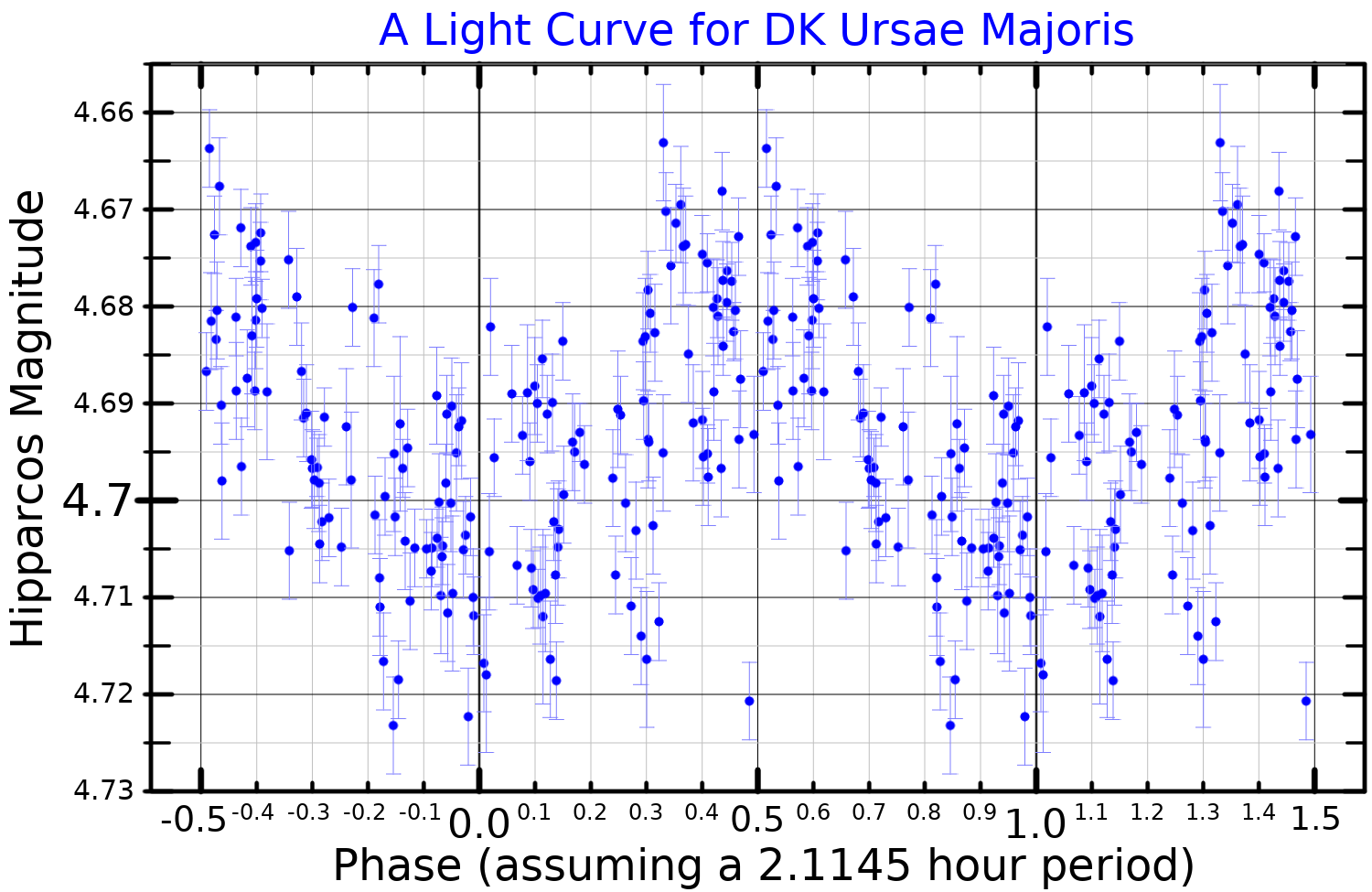
A light curve for DK Ursae Majoris, plotted from Hipparcos data

24 Ursae Majoris has a stellar classification of G4 III-IV, which, at the estimated age of about one billion years, matches the spectrum of an aging giant star blended with features of a subgiant luminosity class. Based upon its position on the H–R diagram, this star has just passed through the Hertzsprung gap and is ready to begin its first ascent along the red-giant branch. Göran Henriksson announced his discovery that it is a variable star, in 1977. It is a suspected RS Canum Venaticorum variable that changes in brightness by up to 0.058 in magnitude. Periods of 22.08 and 2.115 hours have been reported. It is an X-ray source with a luminosity of 207.4×10^{28} erg s^{−1}.

This star has 1.9 times the mass of the Sun and has expanded to 4.6 times the Sun's radius. It is spinning with a rotation period of 10 days. The star is radiating 14.9 times the Sun's luminosity from its enlarged photosphere at an effective temperature of 5,335 K.

== Nomenclature ==
With π^{1}, π^{2}, σ^{1}, σ^{2}, ρ and 2 Ursae Majoris, it composed the Arabic asterism Al Ṭhibā᾽, the Gazelle. According to the catalogue of stars in the Technical Memorandum 33-507 - A Reduced Star Catalog Containing 537 Named Stars, Al Ṭhibā were the title for seven stars: 2 Ursae Majoris as Althiba I, π^{1} as Althiba II, π^{2} as Althiba III, ρ as Althiba IV, σ^{1} as Althiba V, σ^{2} as Althiba VI, and this star (d) as Althiba VII.
