= Table of stars with Bayer designations =

This table lists those stars or other objects which have Bayer designations, grouped by the constellation part of the designation.

Constellation	α	β	γ	δ	ε	ζ	η	θ	ι	κ	λ	μ	ν	ξ	ο	π	ρ	σ	τ	υ	φ	χ	ψ	ω	a	b	c	d	e	f	g	h	i	j	k	l	m	n	o	p	q	r	s	t	u	v	w	x	y	z	A	B	C	D	E	F	G	H	I	J	K	L	M	N	O	P	Q
And	Alpheratz (Note: Also designated Delta Pegasi (δ Pegasi, δ Peg) by Bayer, after Ptolemy – Bayer’s Uranometria and Bayer letters)	Mirach	γ And	δ And	ε And	ζ And	η And	θ And	ι And	κ And	λ And	μ And	ν And	ξ And	ο And	π And	ρ And	σ And	τ And	υ And	φ And	χ And	ψ And	ω And		b And	c And	d And (Note: Designated by John Flamsteed, but it's now no longer used)										n And													A And																
Ant	α Ant	β Ant (Note: Transferred into Hydra in 1930 based on IAU boundaries and it's now no longer used)	γ Ant	δ Ant	ε Ant	ζ^{1} Ant ζ^{2} Ant	η Ant	θ Ant	ι Ant																																																										
Aps	α Aps	β Aps	γ Aps	δ^{1} Aps δ^{2} Aps	ε Aps	ζ Aps	η Aps	θ Aps	ι Aps	κ^{1} Aps κ^{2} Aps																																																									
Aqr	α Aqr	β Aqr	γ Aqr	δ Aqr	ε Aqr	ζ Aqr	η Aqr	θ Aqr	ι Aqr	κ Aqr	λ Aqr	μ Aqr	ν Aqr	ξ Aqr	ο Aqr	π Aqr	ρ Aqr	σ Aqr	τ^{1} Aqr τ^{2} Aqr	υ Aqr	φ Aqr	χ Aqr	ψ^{1} Aqr ψ^{2} Aqr ψ^{3} Aqr	ω^{1} Aqr ω^{2} Aqr		b^{1} Aqr b^{2} Aqr b^{3} Aqr	c^{1} Aqr c^{2} Aqr c^{3} Aqr	d Aqr	e Aqr	f Aqr	g^{1} Aqr g^{2} Aqr	h Aqr	i^{1} Aqr i^{2} Aqr i^{3} Aqr		k Aqr																A^{1} Aqr; A^{2} Aqr																
Aql	Altair	β Aql	γ Aql	δ Aql	ε Aql	ζ Aql	η Aql	θ Aql	ι Aql	κ Aql	λ Aql	μ Aql	ν Aql	ξ Aql	ο Aql	π Aql	ρ Aql (Note: Moved across the border from Aquila into the constellation Delphinus in 1992)	σ Aql	τ Aql	υ Aql	φ Aql	χ Aql	ψ Aql	ω^{1} Aql ω^{2} Aql		b Aql	c Aql	d Aql	e Aql	f Aql	g Aql	h Aql	i Aql		k Aql (Note: In Benjamin Gould's Uranometria, he removed this designation, as he felt it was too faint to warrant a name. However, some modern atlases still uses this designation today (URANOMETRIA ARGENTINA))	l Aql															A Aql																
Ara	α Ara	β Ara	γ Ara	δ Ara	ε^{1} Ara ε^{2} Ara	ζ Ara	η Ara	θ Ara	ι Ara	κ Ara	λ Ara	μ Ara	ν^{1} Ara ν^{2} Ara			π Ara	ρ^{1} Ara ρ^{2} Ara	σ Ara																																																	
Ari	Hamal	β Ari	γ Ari	δ Ari	ε Ari	ζ Ari	η Ari	θ Ari	ι Ari	κ Ari	λ Ari	μ Ari	ν Ari	ξ Ari (Note: Bayer also by mistake catalogued Xi Arietis under the name Psi Ceti (ψ Cet, ψ Ceti), which is no longer used – Bayer’s Uranometria and Bayer letters)	ο Ari	π Ari	ρ^{1} Ari ρ^{2} Ari ρ^{3} Ari	σ Ari	τ^{1} Ari τ^{2} Ari																																																
Aur	Capella	β Aur	γ Aur (Note: Also designated as Beta Tauri (β Tau))	δ Aur	ε Aur	ζ Aur	η Aur	θ Aur	ι Aur	κ Aur	λ Aur	μ Aur	ν Aur	ξ Aur	ο Aur	π Aur	ρ Aur	σ Aur	τ Aur	υ Aur	φ Aur	χ Aur	ψ^{1} Aur ψ^{2} Aur ψ^{3} Aur ψ^{4} Aur ψ^{5} Aur ψ^{6} Aur ψ^{7} Aur ψ^{8} Aur ψ^{9} Aur ψ^{10} Aur (Note: Now included in the constellation Lynx)	ω Aur																																											
	α	β	γ	δ	ε	ζ	η	θ	ι	κ	λ	μ	ν	ξ	ο	π	ρ	σ	τ	υ	φ	χ	ψ	ω	a	b	c	d	e	f	g	h	i	j	k	l	m	n	o	p	q	r	s	t	u	v	w	x	y	z	A	B	C	D	E	F	G	H	I	J	K	L	M	N	O	P	Q
Boo	Arcturus	β Boo	γ Boo	δ Boo	ε Boo	ζ Boo	η Boo	θ Boo	ι Boo	κ Boo	λ Boo	μ^{1} Boo μ^{2} Boo	ν^{1} Boo ν^{2} Boo (Note: Also designated Psi Herculis (ψ Herculis, ψ Her) by Bayer, after Ptolemy – Bayer’s Uranometria and Bayer letters)	ξ Boo	ο Boo	π^{1} Boo π^{2} Boo	ρ Boo	σ Boo	τ Boo	υ Boo	φ Boo	χ Boo	ψ Boo	ω Boo		b Boo	c Boo	d Boo	e Boo	f Boo	g Boo	h Boo	i Boo		k Boo																A Boo																
Cae	α Cae	β Cae	γ^{1} Cae γ^{2} Cae	δ Cae		ζ Cae					λ Cae		ν Cae																																																						
Cam	α Cam	β Cam	γ Cam																																																																
Cnc	α Cnc	β Cnc	γ Cnc	δ Cnc	ε Cnc	ζ Cnc	η Cnc	θ Cnc	ι Cnc	κ Cnc	λ Cnc	μ^{1} Cnc μ^{2} Cnc	ν Cnc	ξ Cnc	ο^{1} Cnc ο^{2} Cnc	π^{1} Cnc π^{2} Cnc	ρ^{1} Cnc ρ^{2} Cnc	σ^{1} Cnc σ^{2} Cnc σ^{3} Cnc	τ Cnc	υ^{1} Cnc υ^{2} Cnc	φ^{1} Cnc φ^{2} Cnc	χ Cnc	ψ^{1} Cnc ψ^{2} Cnc	ω^{1} Cnc ω^{2} Cnc		b Cnc	c Cnc	d^{1} Cnc d^{2} Cnc																							A^{1} Cnc; A^{2} Cnc																
CVn	Cor Caroli	β CVn																																																																	
CMa	Sirius	β CMa	γ CMa	δ CMa	ε CMa	ζ CMa	η CMa	θ CMa	ι CMa	κ CMa	λ CMa	μ CMa	ν^{1} CMa ν^{2} CMa ν^{3} CMa	ξ^{1} CMa ξ^{2} CMa	ο^{1} CMa ο^{2} CMa	π CMa	ρ CMa (Note: This star designation is now rarely used)	σ CMa	τ CMa					ω CMa																																											
CMi	Procyon	β CMi	γ CMi	δ^{1} CMi δ^{2} CMi δ^{3} CMi	ε CMi	ζ CMi	η CMi				λ CMi																																																								
Cap	α^{1} Cap α^{2} Cap	β Cap	γ Cap	δ Cap	ε Cap	ζ Cap	η Cap	θ Cap	ι Cap	κ Cap	λ Cap	μ Cap	ν Cap	ξ^{1} Cap ξ^{2} Cap	ο^{1} Cap ο^{2} Cap	π Cap	ρ Cap	σ Cap	τ^{1} Cap τ^{2} Cap	υ Cap	φ Cap	χ Cap	ψ Cap	ω Cap		b Cap	c^{1} Cap c^{2} Cap																								A Cap																
	α	β	γ	δ	ε	ζ	η	θ	ι	κ	λ	μ	ν	ξ	ο	π	ρ	σ	τ	υ	φ	χ	ψ	ω	a	b	c	d	e	f	g	h	i	j	k	l	m	n	o	p	q	r	s	t	u	v	w	x	y	z	A	B	C	D	E	F	G	H	I	J	K	L	M	N	O	P	Q
Car	Canopus	β Car			ε Car		η Car	θ Car	ι Car											υ Car		χ Car		ω Car	a Car	b^{1} Car b^{2} Car	c Car	d Car	e^{1} Car e^{2} Car	f Car	g Car	h Car	i Car		k Car	l Car	m Car			p Car	q Car	r Car	s Car	t^{1} Car t^{2} Car	u Car		w Car	x Car	y Car	z^{1} Car z^{2} Car	A Car (Note: Catalogued B Puppis by Lacaille, reassigned to Carina as A Carinae by Gould)	B Car	C Car	D Car; D^{2} Car; D^{3} Car	E Car		G Car	H Car	I Car		K Car	L Car	M Car	N Car	O Car	P Car	Q Car
Cas	α Cas	β Cas	γ Cas	δ Cas	ε Cas	ζ Cas	η Cas	θ Cas	ι Cas	κ Cas	λ Cas	μ Cas	ν Cas	ξ Cas	ο Cas	π Cas	ρ Cas	σ Cas	τ Cas	υ^{1} Cas υ^{2} Cas	φ Cas	χ Cas	ψ Cas	ω Cas																											A Cas																
Cen	α Cen	β Cen	γ Cen	δ Cen	ε Cen	ζ Cen	η Cen	θ Cen	ι Cen	κ Cen	λ Cen	μ Cen	ν Cen	ξ^{1} Cen ξ^{2} Cen	ο^{1} Cen ο^{2} Cen	π Cen	ρ Cen	σ Cen	τ Cen	υ^{1} Cen υ^{2} Cen	φ Cen	χ Cen	ψ Cen	(ω Cen)	a Cen	b Cen	c^{1} Cen c^{2} Cen	d Cen	e Cen	f Cen	g Cen	h Cen	i Cen	j Cen	k Cen	l Cen	m Cen	n Cen		p Cen		r Cen			u Cen	v Cen	w Cen	x^{1} Cen x^{2} Cen	y Cen	z Cen	A Cen	B Cen	C^{1} Cen; C^{2} Cen; C^{3} Cen	D Cen	E Cen	F Cen	G Cen	H Cen		J Cen	K Cen		M Cen	N Cen			Q Cen
Cep	α Cep	β Cep	γ Cep	δ Cep	ε Cep	ζ Cep	η Cep	θ Cep	ι Cep	κ Cep	λ Cep	μ Cep	ν Cep	ξ Cep	ο Cep	π Cep	ρ^{1} Cep ρ^{2} Cep			υ Cep (Note: Upsilon Cephei was designated to the star HR 7955 that appeared in Burritt's star atlas, but no confirmation of it designated elsewhere)																																															
Cet	α Cet	β Cet	γ Cet	δ Cet	ε Cet	ζ Cet	η Cet	θ Cet	ι Cet	κ^{1} Cet (Note: Bayer also by mistake catalogued Kappa Ceti under the name g Tauri, which is no longer used – Bayer’s Uranometria and Bayer letters) κ^{2} Cet	λ Cet	μ Cet	ν Cet	ξ^{1} Cet ξ^{2} Cet	Mira	π Cet	ρ Cet	σ Cet	τ Cet	υ Cet	φ^{1} Cet φ^{2} Cet φ^{3} Cet φ^{4} Cet	χ Cet	ψ Cet (Note: Bayer used the designations Xi Arietis and Psi Ceti for the same star, but Psi Ceti is no longer used – Bayer’s Uranometria and Bayer letters)																																												
Cha	α Cha	β Cha	γ Cha	δ^{1} Cha δ^{2} Cha	ε Cha	ζ Cha	η Cha	θ Cha	ι Cha	κ Cha	λ Cha (Note: Benjamin Gould included this star in Musca and it's now no longer used)	μ^{1} Cha μ^{2} Cha	ν Cha			π Cha																																																			
Cir	α Cir	β Cir	γ Cir	δ Cir	ε Cir	ζ Cir	η Cir	θ Cir																																																											
Col	α Col	β Col	γ Col	δ Col	ε Col		η Col	θ Col		κ Col	λ Col	μ Col	ν^{1} Col ν^{2} Col	ξ Col	ο Col	π^{1} Col π^{2} Col		σ Col																																																	
	α	β	γ	δ	ε	ζ	η	θ	ι	κ	λ	μ	ν	ξ	ο	π	ρ	σ	τ	υ	φ	χ	ψ	ω	a	b	c	d	e	f	g	h	i	j	k	l	m	n	o	p	q	r	s	t	u	v	w	x	y	z	A	B	C	D	E	F	G	H	I	J	K	L	M	N	O	P	Q
Com	α Com	β Com	γ Com																																																																
CrA	α CrA	β CrA	γ CrA	δ CrA	ε CrA	ζ CrA	η^{1} CrA η^{2} CrA	θ CrA		κ^{1} CrA κ^{2} CrA	λ CrA	μ CrA																																																							
CrB	α CrB	β CrB	γ CrB	δ CrB	ε CrB	ζ CrB	η CrB	θ CrB	ι CrB	κ CrB	λ CrB	μ CrB	ν^{1} CrB ν^{2} CrB	ξ CrB	ο CrB	π CrB	ρ CrB	σ CrB	τ CrB	υ CrB																																															
Crv	α Crv	β Crv	γ Crv	δ Crv	ε Crv	ζ Crv	η Crv	θ Crv (Note: Designated by Johann Bode, but it is now no longer used Ioannis Elerti Bode uranographia)	ι Crv	κ Crv																																																									
Crt	α Crt	β Crt	γ Crt	δ Crt	ε Crt	ζ Crt	η Crt	θ Crt	ι Crt	κ Crt	λ Crt	μ Crt											ψ Crt																																												
Cru	Acrux	Mimosa	Gacrux	δ Cru	ε Cru	ζ Cru	η Cru	θ^{1} Cru θ^{2} Cru	ι Cru	κ Cru	λ Cru	μ Cru																																																							
Cyg	Deneb	Albireo	γ Cyg	δ Cyg	ε Cyg	ζ Cyg	η Cyg	θ Cyg	ι^{1} Cyg ι^{2} Cyg	κ Cyg	λ Cyg	μ Cyg	ν Cyg	ξ Cyg	ο^{1} Cyg (Note: Sometimes Omicron^{2} Cygni instead of Omicron^{1} Cygni; often applied to it) ο^{2} Cyg (Note: Sometimes Omicron^{3} Cygni instead of Omicron^{2} Cygni; often applied to it) ο^{3} Cyg (Note: Often applied to Omicron^{2} Cygni)	π^{1} Cyg π^{2} Cyg	ρ Cyg	σ Cyg	τ Cyg	υ Cyg	φ Cyg	χ Cyg	ψ Cyg	ω^{1} Cyg ω^{2} Cyg		b^{1} Cyg b^{2} Cyg b^{3} Cyg	c Cyg	d Cyg	e Cyg	f^{1} Cyg f^{2} Cyg	g Cyg																				A Cyg															P Cyg	Q Cyg
Del	α Del	β Del	γ^{1} Del γ^{2} Del	δ Del	ε Del	ζ Del	η Del	θ Del	ι Del	κ Del																																																									
	α	β	γ	δ	ε	ζ	η	θ	ι	κ	λ	μ	ν	ξ	ο	π	ρ	σ	τ	υ	φ	χ	ψ	ω	a	b	c	d	e	f	g	h	i	j	k	l	m	n	o	p	q	r	s	t	u	v	w	x	y	z	A	B	C	D	E	F	G	H	I	J	K	L	M	N	O	P	Q
Dor	α Dor	β Dor	γ Dor	δ Dor	ε Dor	ζ Dor	η^{1} Dor η^{2} Dor	θ Dor		κ Dor	λ Dor	μ Dor (Note: Mu Doradus was originally not catalogued, but was mistakenly designated to HD 42540 in Pictor at incorrect coordinates)	ν Dor			π^{1} Dor π^{2} Dor																																																			
Dra	Thuban	β Dra	γ Dra	δ Dra	ε Dra	ζ Dra	η Dra	θ Dra	ι Dra	κ Dra	λ Dra	μ Dra	ν Dra	ξ Dra	ο Dra	π Dra	ρ Dra	σ Dra	τ Dra	υ Dra	φ Dra	χ Dra	ψ^{1} Dra ψ^{2} Dra	ω Dra		b Dra	c Dra	d Dra	e Dra	f Dra	g Dra	h Dra	i Dra																		A Dra																
Equ	α Equ	β Equ	γ Equ	δ Equ	ε Equ	ζ Equ (Note: Designated by Johann Bode, but it is now no longer used Ioannis Elerti Bode uranographia)	η Equ	θ Equ			λ Equ																																																								
Eri	Achernar	β Eri	γ Eri	δ Eri	ε Eri	ζ Eri	η Eri	θ Eri	ι Eri	κ Eri	λ Eri	μ Eri	ν Eri	ξ Eri	ο^{1} Eri ο^{2} Eri	π Eri	ρ^{1} Eri ρ^{2} Eri ρ^{3} Eri	σ Eri (Note: Sigma Eridani is non-existent, but was incorrectly called out on the star HD 17943 in the 1991 edition of the Bright Star Catalogued)	τ^{1} Eri τ^{2} Eri τ^{3} Eri τ^{4} Eri τ^{5} Eri τ^{6} Eri τ^{7} Eri τ^{8} Eri τ^{9} Eri	υ^{1} Eri υ^{2} Eri υ^{3} Eri υ^{4} Eri	φ Eri	χ Eri	ψ Eri	ω Eri		b Eri	c Eri	d Eri	e Eri	f Eri	g Eri	h Eri	i Eri			l Eri				p Eri	q^{1} Eri q^{2} Eri	r Eri	s Eri		u Eri (Note: Francis Baily dropped this designation)	v Eri	w Eri		y Eri	z Eri	A Eri																
For	α For	β For	γ^{1} For γ^{2} For	δ For	ε For	ζ For	η^{1} For η^{2} For η^{3} For		ι^{1} For ι^{2} For	κ For	λ^{1} For λ^{2} For	μ For	ν For			π For	ρ For	σ For	τ For	υ For	φ For	χ^{1} For χ^{2} For χ^{3} For	ψ For	ω For																																											
Gem	Castor	Pollux	γ Gem	δ Gem	ε Gem	ζ Gem	η Gem	θ Gem	ι Gem	κ Gem	λ Gem	μ Gem	ν Gem	ξ Gem	ο Gem	π Gem	ρ Gem	σ Gem	τ Gem	υ Gem	φ Gem	χ Gem	ψ Gem (Note: Transferred into Cancer in 1930 based on IAU boundaries and it's now no longer used)	ω Gem		b Gem	c Gem	d Gem	e Gem	f Gem	g Gem																				A Gem																
Gru	α Gru	β Gru	γ Gru (Note: It had the Bayer designation Kappa Piscis Austrini (κ Piscis Austrini, κ PsA) when it was still part of Piscis Austrinus, extending the fish's tail southwards. Bayer straightened out the fish's tail to avoid overlapping into Grus and the designation is no longer used)	δ^{1} Gru δ^{2} Gru	ε Gru	ζ Gru	η Gru	θ Gru	ι Gru	κ Gru	λ Gru	μ^{1} Gru μ^{2} Gru	ν Gru	ξ Gru	ο Gru	π^{1} Gru π^{2} Gru	ρ Gru	σ^{1} Gru σ^{2} Gru	τ^{1} Gru τ^{2} Gru τ^{3} Gru	υ Gru	φ Gru																																														
Her	α Her	β Her	γ Her	δ Her	ε Her	ζ Her	η Her	θ Her	ι Her	κ Her	λ Her	μ Her	ν Her	ξ Her	ο Her	π Her	ρ Her	σ Her	τ Her	υ Her	φ Her	χ Her	ψ Her (Note: Also designated as Nu^{2} Boötis (ν^{2} Boo))	ω Her		b Her	c Her	d Her	e Her	f Her	g Her	h Her	i Her		k Her	l Her	m Her	n Her	o Her		q Her	r Her	s Her	t Her	u Her		w Her	x Her	y Her	z Her	A Her																
	α	β	γ	δ	ε	ζ	η	θ	ι	κ	λ	μ	ν	ξ	ο	π	ρ	σ	τ	υ	φ	χ	ψ	ω	a	b	c	d	e	f	g	h	i	j	k	l	m	n	o	p	q	r	s	t	u	v	w	x	y	z	A	B	C	D	E	F	G	H	I	J	K	L	M	N	O	P	Q
Hor	α Hor	β Hor	γ Hor	δ Hor		ζ Hor	η Hor		ι Hor		λ Hor	μ Hor	ν Hor																																																						
Hya	Alphard	β Hya	γ Hya	δ Hya	ε Hya	ζ Hya	η Hya	θ Hya	ι Hya	κ Hya	λ Hya	μ Hya	ν Hya	ξ Hya	ο Hya	π Hya	ρ Hya	σ Hya	τ^{1} Hya τ^{2} Hya	υ^{1} Hya υ^{2} Hya	φ^{1} Hya φ^{2} Hya φ^{3} Hya	χ^{1} Hya χ^{2} Hya	ψ Hya	ω Hya	a Hya	b^{1} Hya b^{2} Hya b^{3} Hya	c Hya (Note: Even though it is no longer used in modern atlases, there is no mention of this star being undesignated)	d Hya	e Hya	f Hya	g Hya	h Hya			k Hya	l Hya	m Hya														A Hya		C Hya	D Hya	E Hya	F Hya	G Hya	H Hya	I Hya							P Hya	
Hyi	α Hyi	β Hyi	γ Hyi	δ Hyi	ε Hyi	ζ Hyi	η^{1} Hyi η^{2} Hyi	θ Hyi	ι Hyi	κ Hyi	λ Hyi	μ Hyi	ν Hyi			π^{1} Hyi π^{2} Hyi		σ Hyi	τ^{1} Hyi τ^{2} Hyi																																																
Ind	α Ind	β Ind	γ Ind	δ Ind	ε Ind	ζ Ind	η Ind	θ Ind	ι Ind	κ^{1} Ind κ^{2} Ind	λ Ind (Note: It was moved into Pavo and the designation was dropped)	μ Ind	ν Ind		ο Ind	π Ind	ρ Ind																																																		
Lac	α Lac	β Lac																																																																	
Leo	Regulus	Denebola	γ Leo	δ Leo	ε Leo	ζ Leo	η Leo	θ Leo	ι Leo	κ Leo	λ Leo	μ Leo	ν Leo	ξ Leo	ο Leo	π Leo	ρ Leo	σ Leo	τ Leo	υ Leo	φ Leo	χ Leo	ψ Leo	ω Leo		b Leo	c Leo	d Leo	e Leo	f Leo	g Leo	h Leo			k Leo	l Leo	m Leo	n Leo	o Leo	p^{1} Leo p^{2} Leo p^{3} Leo p^{4} Leo p^{5} Leo											A Leo																
LMi		β LMi																																					o LMi																												
Lep	α Lep	β Lep	γ Lep	δ Lep	ε Lep	ζ Lep	η Lep	θ Lep	ι Lep	κ Lep	λ Lep	μ Lep	ν Lep																																																						
	α	β	γ	δ	ε	ζ	η	θ	ι	κ	λ	μ	ν	ξ	ο	π	ρ	σ	τ	υ	φ	χ	ψ	ω	a	b	c	d	e	f	g	h	i	j	k	l	m	n	o	p	q	r	s	t	u	v	w	x	y	z	A	B	C	D	E	F	G	H	I	J	K	L	M	N	O	P	Q
Lib	α Lib	β Lib	γ Lib	δ Lib	ε Lib	ζ^{1} Lib ζ^{2} Lib ζ^{3} Lib ζ^{4} Lib	η Lib	θ Lib	ι^{1} Lib ι^{2} Lib	κ Lib	λ Lib	μ Lib	ν Lib	ξ^{1} Lib ξ^{2} Lib	ο Lib			σ Lib (Note: Catalogued by Bayer as Gamma Scorpii (γ Sco, γ Scorpii), reassigned by Gould to Libra - Burnham, Robert (1978), Burnham's celestial handbook: an observer's guide to the universe beyond the Solar System, Dover Books on Astronomy, vol. 2 (2nd ed.), Courier Dover Publications, p. 1108, ISBN 0486235688.; Wagman, Morton (2003), Lost Stars, McDonald & Woodward, ISBN 0939923785)	τ Lib	υ Lib																																															
Lup	α Lup	β Lup	γ Lup	δ Lup	ε Lup	ζ Lup	η Lup	θ Lup	ι Lup	κ Lup	λ Lup	μ Lup	ν^{1} Lup ν^{2} Lup	ξ^{1} Lup ξ^{2} Lup	ο Lup	π Lup	ρ Lup	σ Lup	τ^{1} Lup τ^{2} Lup	υ Lup	φ^{1} Lup φ^{2} Lup	χ Lup	ψ^{1} Lup ψ^{2} Lup	ω Lup	a Lup	b Lup	c Lup	d Lup	e Lup	f Lup	g Lup	h Lup	i Lup		k Lup																																
Lyn	α Lyn																																																																		
Lyr	Vega	β Lyr	γ Lyr	δ^{1} Lyr δ^{2} Lyr	ε Lyr	ζ^{1} Lyr ζ^{2} Lyr	η Lyr	θ Lyr	ι Lyr	κ Lyr	λ Lyr	μ Lyr	ν^{1} Lyr ν^{2} Lyr																																																						
Men	α Men	β Men	γ Men	δ Men	ε Men	ζ Men	η Men	θ Men	ι Men	κ Men	λ Men	μ Men	ν Men	ξ Men		π Men																																																			
Mic	α Mic	β Mic	γ Mic	δ Mic	ε Mic	ζ Mic	η Mic	θ^{1} Mic θ^{2} Mic	ι Mic				ν Mic																																																						
Mon	α Mon	β Mon	γ Mon	δ Mon	ε Mon	ζ Mon																																																													
Mus	α Mus	β Mus	γ Mus	δ Mus	ε Mus	ζ^{1} Mus ζ^{2} Mus	η Mus	θ Mus	ι^{1} Mus ι^{2} Mus		λ Mus	μ Mus																																																							
	α	β	γ	δ	ε	ζ	η	θ	ι	κ	λ	μ	ν	ξ	ο	π	ρ	σ	τ	υ	φ	χ	ψ	ω	a	b	c	d	e	f	g	h	i	j	k	l	m	n	o	p	q	r	s	t	u	v	w	x	y	z	A	B	C	D	E	F	G	H	I	J	K	L	M	N	O	P	Q
Nor	α Nor (Note: Now known as N Scorpii (N Sco))	β Nor (Note: Now known as H Scorpii (H Sco))	γ^{1} Nor γ^{2} Nor	δ Nor	ε Nor	ζ Nor	η Nor	θ Nor	ι^{1} Nor ι^{2} Nor	κ Nor	λ Nor	μ Nor																																																							
Oct	α Oct	β Oct	γ^{1} Oct γ^{2} Oct γ^{3} Oct	δ Oct	ε Oct	ζ Oct	η Oct	θ Oct	ι Oct	κ Oct	λ Oct	μ^{1} Oct μ^{2} Oct	ν Oct	ξ Oct	ο Oct	π^{1} Oct π^{2} Oct	ρ Oct	σ Oct	τ Oct	υ Oct	φ Oct	χ Oct	ψ Oct	ω Oct																																											
Oph	α Oph	β Oph	γ Oph	δ Oph	ε Oph	ζ Oph	η Oph	θ Oph	ι Oph	κ Oph	λ Oph	μ Oph	ν Oph	ξ Oph	ο Oph		ρ Oph	σ Oph	τ Oph	υ Oph	φ Oph	χ Oph	ψ Oph	ω Oph		b Oph	c Oph	d Oph (Note: Lacaille's Theta Telescopii (θ Tel, θ Telescopii) was reassigned to Ophiuchus – Star Tales – Telescopium)	e Oph	f Oph										p Oph											A Oph																
Ori	Betelgeuse	Rigel	Bellatrix	Mintaka	Alnilam	Alnitak	η Ori	θ^{1} Ori A θ^{1} Ori B θ^{1} Ori C θ^{1} Ori D θ^{1} Ori E θ^{2} Ori	ι Ori	Saiph	Meissa	μ Ori	ν Ori	ξ Ori	ο^{1} Ori ο^{2} Ori	π^{1} Ori π^{2} Ori π^{3} Ori π^{4} Ori π^{5} Ori π^{6} Ori	ρ Ori	σ Ori	τ Ori	υ Ori	φ^{1} Ori φ^{2} Ori	χ^{1} Ori χ^{2} Ori	ψ^{1} Ori ψ^{2} Ori	ω Ori		b Ori	c Ori	d Ori	e Ori	f^{1} Ori f^{2} Ori	g Ori	h Ori	i Ori		k Ori	l Ori	m Ori	n^{1} Ori n^{2} Ori	o Ori	p Ori											A Ori																
Pav	α Pav	β Pav	γ Pav	δ Pav	ε Pav	ζ Pav	η Pav	θ Pav	ι Pav	κ Pav	λ Pav	μ^{1} Pav μ^{2} Pav	ν Pav	ξ Pav	ο Pav	π Pav	ρ Pav	σ Pav	τ Pav	υ Pav	φ^{1} Pav φ^{2} Pav			ω Pav																																											
Peg	α Peg	β Peg	γ Peg	Alpheratz (Note: Also designated as Alpha Andromedae (α And))	ε Peg	ζ Peg	η Peg	θ Peg	ι Peg	κ Peg	λ Peg	μ Peg	ν Peg	ξ Peg	ο Peg	π^{1} Peg π^{2} Peg	ρ Peg	σ Peg	τ Peg	υ Peg	φ Peg	χ Peg	ψ Peg																																												
Per	α Per	Algol	γ Per	δ Per	ε Per	ζ Per	η Per	θ Per	ι Per	κ Per	λ Per	μ Per	ν Per	ξ Per	ο Per	π Per	ρ Per	σ Per	τ Per	υ Per (Note: Now included in the constellation Andromeda)	φ Per	χ Per (Note: Bayer's Chi Persei is NGC 884, the eastern cluster of the Double Cluster – Wagman, Morton (2003), Lost Stars, McDonald & Woodward, ISBN 0939923785)	ψ Per	ω Per		b Per	c Per	d Per	e Per	f Per	g Per	h Per (Note: Bayer's h Persei is NGC 869, the western cluster of the Double Cluster – Wagman, Morton (2003), Lost Stars, McDonald & Woodward, ISBN 0939923785)	i Per		k Per	l Per	m Per	n Per	o Per												A Per																
Phe	α Phe	β Phe	γ Phe	δ Phe	ε Phe	ζ Phe	η Phe	θ Phe	ι Phe	κ Phe	λ^{1} Phe λ^{2} Phe	μ Phe	ν Phe	ξ Phe		π Phe	ρ Phe	σ Phe	τ Phe	υ Phe	φ Phe	χ Phe	ψ Phe	ω Phe																																											
	α	β	γ	δ	ε	ζ	η	θ	ι	κ	λ	μ	ν	ξ	ο	π	ρ	σ	τ	υ	φ	χ	ψ	ω	a	b	c	d	e	f	g	h	i	j	k	l	m	n	o	p	q	r	s	t	u	v	w	x	y	z	A	B	C	D	E	F	G	H	I	J	K	L	M	N	O	P	Q
Pic	α Pic	β Pic	γ Pic	δ Pic		ζ Pic	η^{1} Pic η^{2} Pic	θ Pic	ι Pic	κ Pic	λ Pic	μ Pic	ν Pic																																																						
Psc	α Psc	β Psc	γ Psc	δ Psc	ε Psc	ζ Psc	η Psc	θ Psc	ι Psc	κ Psc	λ Psc	μ Psc	ν Psc	ξ Psc	ο Psc	π Psc	ρ Psc	σ Psc	τ Psc	υ Psc	φ Psc	χ Psc	ψ^{1} Psc ψ^{2} Psc ψ^{3} Psc	ω Psc		b Psc	c Psc	d Psc	e Psc	f Psc	g Psc	h Psc	i Psc		k Psc	l Psc															A Psc																
PsA	Fomalhaut	β PsA	γ PsA	δ PsA	ε PsA	ζ PsA	η PsA	θ PsA	ι PsA	κ PsA (Note: Now known as Gamma Gruis (γ Gru))	λ PsA	μ PsA				π PsA			τ PsA	υ PsA																																															
Pup						ζ Pup							ν Pup	ξ Pup	ο Pup	π Pup	ρ Pup	σ Pup	τ Pup	υ^{1} Pup (Note: Also designated as v^{1} Puppis by Gould, but it is now rarely used) υ^{2} Pup (Note: Also designated as v^{2} Puppis by Gould, but it is now rarely used)		χ Pup			a Pup	b Pup	c Pup	d^{1} Pup d^{2} Pup d^{3} Pup d^{4} Pup	e Pup	f Pup		h^{1} Pup h^{2} Pup		j Pup	k Pup	l Pup	m Pup	n Pup	o Pup (Note: The star originally designated o Puppis (Latin lower case 'o') is now generally called Omicron Puppis.)	p Pup	q Pup	r Pup		t Pup		v^{1} Pup v^{2} Pup	w Pup	x Pup	y^{1} Pup y^{2} Pup y^{3} Pup	z Pup	A Pup	B Pup (Note: Now known as A Carinae (A Car))	C Pup	D Pup	E Pup	F Pup	G Pup	H Pup	I Pup	J Pup		L^{1} Pup; L^{2} Pup	M Pup	N Pup	O Pup	P Pup	Q Pup
Pyx	α Pyx	β Pyx	γ Pyx	δ Pyx	ε Pyx	ζ Pyx	η Pyx	θ Pyx		κ Pyx	λ Pyx																																																								
Ret	α Ret	β Ret	γ Ret	δ Ret	ε Ret	ζ Ret	η Ret	θ Ret	ι Ret	κ Ret																																																									
Sge	α Sge	β Sge	γ Sge	δ Sge	ε Sge	ζ Sge	η Sge	θ Sge																																								x Sge	y Sge	z Sge																	
Sgr	α Sgr	β^{1} Sgr β^{2} Sgr	γ^{1} Sgr γ^{2} Sgr	δ Sgr	ε Sgr	ζ Sgr	η Sgr (Note: Lacaille's Beta Telescopii (β Tel, β Telescopii) was reassigned to Sagittarius – Star Tales – Telescopium)	θ^{1} Sgr θ^{2} Sgr	ι Sgr	κ^{1} Sgr κ^{2} Sgr	λ Sgr	μ Sgr	ν^{1} Sgr ν^{2} Sgr	ξ^{1} Sgr ξ^{2} Sgr	ο Sgr	π Sgr	ρ^{1} Sgr ρ^{2} Sgr	σ Sgr	τ Sgr	υ Sgr	φ Sgr	χ^{1} Sgr χ^{2} Sgr χ^{3} Sgr	ψ Sgr	ω Sgr		b Sgr	c Sgr	d Sgr	e^{1} Sgr e^{2} Sgr	f Sgr	g Sgr	h^{1} Sgr h^{2} Sgr																			A Sgr																
	α	β	γ	δ	ε	ζ	η	θ	ι	κ	λ	μ	ν	ξ	ο	π	ρ	σ	τ	υ	φ	χ	ψ	ω	a	b	c	d	e	f	g	h	i	j	k	l	m	n	o	p	q	r	s	t	u	v	w	x	y	z	A	B	C	D	E	F	G	H	I	J	K	L	M	N	O	P	Q
Sco	Antares	β Sco	γ Sco (Note: Now known as Sigma Librae (σ Lib))	δ Sco	ε Sco	ζ^{1} Sco ζ^{2} Sco	η Sco	θ Sco	ι^{1} Sco ι^{2} Sco	κ Sco	λ Sco	μ^{1} Sco μ^{2} Sco	ν Sco	ξ Sco	ο Sco	π Sco	ρ Sco	σ Sco	τ Sco	υ Sco	φ Sco (Note: This designation may relate to 48 Librae or 49 Librae)	χ Sco	ψ Sco	ω^{1} Sco ω^{2} Sco		b Sco	c^{1} Sco c^{2} Sco	d Sco					i Sco		k Sco																A Sco						G Sco (Note: Lacaille's Gamma Telescopii (γ Tel, γ Telescopii) was reassigned to Scorpius – Star Tales – Telescopium)	H Sco (Note: Lacaille's Beta Normae (β Nor, β Normae) was reassigned to Scorpius – Star Tales – Norma)						N Sco (Note: Lacaille's Alpha Normae (α Nor, α Normae) was reassigned to Scorpius – Star Tales – Norma)			Q Sco
Scl	α Scl	β Scl	γ Scl	δ Scl	ε Scl	ζ Scl	η Scl	θ Scl	ι Scl	κ^{1} Scl κ^{2} Scl	λ^{1} Scl λ^{2} Scl	μ Scl		ξ Scl		π Scl		σ Scl	τ Scl																																																
Sct	α Sct	β Sct	γ Sct	δ Sct	ε Sct	ζ Sct	η Sct																																																												
Ser	α Ser	β Ser	γ Ser	δ Ser	ε Ser	ζ Ser	η Ser	θ Ser	ι Ser	κ Ser	λ Ser	μ Ser	ν Ser	ξ Ser	ο Ser	π Ser	ρ Ser	σ Ser	τ^{1} Ser τ^{2} Ser τ^{3} Ser τ^{4} Ser τ^{5} Ser τ^{6} Ser τ^{7} Ser τ^{8} Ser	υ Ser	φ Ser	χ Ser	ψ Ser	ω Ser		b Ser	c Ser	d Ser	e Ser																						A^{1} Ser; A^{2} Ser																
Sex	α Sex	β Sex	γ Sex	δ Sex	ε Sex																																																														
Tau	Aldebaran	β Tau (Note: Also designated Gamma Aurigae (γ Aur, γ Aurigae) by Bayer, after Ptolemy – Bayer’s Uranometria and Bayer letters)	γ Tau	δ^{1} Tau δ^{2} Tau δ^{3} Tau	ε Tau	ζ Tau	Alcyone	θ Tau	ι Tau	κ Tau	λ Tau	μ Tau	ν Tau	ξ Tau	ο Tau	π Tau	ρ Tau	σ^{1} Tau σ^{2} Tau	τ Tau	υ Tau	φ Tau	χ Tau	ψ Tau	ω^{1} Tau ω^{2} Tau		b Tau	c Tau	d Tau	e Tau	f Tau	g Tau (Note: Bayer used the designations Kappa Ceti and g Tauri for the same star, but g Tauri is no longer used – Bayer’s Uranometria and Bayer letters)	h Tau	i Tau		k Tau	l Tau	m Tau	n Tau	o Tau	p Tau	q Tau	r Tau	s Tau	t Tau	u Tau						A^{1} Tau; A^{2} Tau																
Tel	α Tel	β Tel (Note: Now known as Eta Sagittarii (η Sgr))	γ Tel (Note: Now known as G Scorpii (G Sco))	δ^{1} Tel δ^{2} Tel	ε Tel	ζ Tel	η Tel	θ Tel (Note: Now known as d Ophiuchi (d Oph))	ι Tel	κ Tel	λ Tel	μ Tel	ν Tel	ξ Tel			ρ Tel	σ Tel (Note: Moved into Corona Australis, but was initially removed from star catalogues)	τ Tel (Note: Benjamin Gould droppped this designation)																																																
Tri	α Tri	β Tri	γ Tri	δ Tri	ε Tri		η Tri		ι Tri																a Tri		c Tri	d Tri																																							
	α	β	γ	δ	ε	ζ	η	θ	ι	κ	λ	μ	ν	ξ	ο	π	ρ	σ	τ	υ	φ	χ	ψ	ω	a	b	c	d	e	f	g	h	i	j	k	l	m	n	o	p	q	r	s	t	u	v	w	x	y	z	A	B	C	D	E	F	G	H	I	J	K	L	M	N	O	P	Q
TrA	α TrA	β TrA	γ TrA	δ TrA	ε TrA	ζ TrA	η TrA (Note: Designated Eta^{1} (η^{1}), as mentioned in Benjamin Gould's Uranometria) η^{2} TrA (Note: This was mentioned in Benjamin Gould's Uranometria)	θ TrA	ι TrA	κ TrA	λ TrA																																																								
Tuc	α Tuc	β Tuc	γ Tuc	δ Tuc	ε Tuc	ζ Tuc	η Tuc	θ Tuc	ι Tuc	κ Tuc	λ^{1} Tuc λ^{2} Tuc		ν Tuc	(47 Tuc)		π Tuc	ρ Tuc																																																		
UMa	Dubhe	Merak	Phecda	Megrez	Alioth	Mizar	Alkaid	θ UMa	ι UMa	κ UMa	λ UMa	μ UMa	ν UMa	ξ UMa	ο UMa	π^{1} UMa π^{2} UMa	ρ UMa	σ^{1} UMa σ^{2} UMa	τ UMa	υ UMa	φ UMa	χ UMa	ψ UMa	ω UMa		b UMa	c UMa	d UMa	e UMa	f UMa	Alcor	h UMa																			A UMa																
UMi	Polaris	Kochab	Pherkad	Yildun	ε UMi	ζ UMi	η UMi	θ UMi			λ UMi					π^{1} UMi π^{2} UMi																																																			
Vel			γ Vel	δ Vel						κ Vel	λ Vel	μ Vel			ο Vel						φ Vel		ψ Vel		a Vel	b Vel	c Vel	d Vel	e Vel	f Vel	g Vel	h Vel	i Vel		k^{1} Vel k Vel (Note: Designated k2 (k^{2}), as mentioned in Benjamin Gould's Uranometria)	l Vel	m Vel	n Vel		p Vel	q Vel	r Vel	s Vel	t Vel	u Vel		w Vel	x Vel	y Vel	z Vel	A Vel	B Vel	C Vel	D Vel	E Vel	F Vel		H Vel	I Vel	J Vel	K Vel	L Vel	M Vel	N Vel	O Vel		Q Vel
Vir	Spica	β Vir	γ Vir	δ Vir	ε Vir	ζ Vir	η Vir	θ Vir	ι Vir	κ Vir	λ Vir	μ Vir	ν Vir	ξ Vir	ο Vir	π Vir	ρ Vir	σ Vir	τ Vir	υ Vir	φ Vir	χ Vir	ψ Vir	ω Vir		b Vir	c Vir	d^{1} Vir d^{2} Vir	e Vir	f Vir	g Vir	h Vir	i Vir		k Vir	l Vir	m Vir		o Vir	p Vir	q Vir								y Vir		A^{1} Vir; A^{2} Vir												M Vir				
Vol	α Vol	β Vol	γ Vol	δ Vol	ε Vol	ζ Vol	η Vol	θ Vol	ι Vol	κ Vol																																																									
Vul	α Vul																																																																		

== See also ==
- Greek alphabet
- List of constellations
- Table of stars with Flamsteed designations
