= B Hydrae =

The Bayer designation b Hydrae refers to three different stars in the constellation Hydra:

- b^{1} Hydrae, (3 Crateris, HD 93397), an F-type main-sequence star
- b^{2} Hydrae, (5 Crateris, 249 G. Hydrae, HD 94046), an A-type main-sequence star
- b^{3} Hydrae, (6 Crateris, 257 G. Hydrae, HD 94388), a F-type main-sequence star
