= Upsilon Puppis =

The Bayer designation υ Puppis (Upsilon Puppis) is shared by two stars in the constellation Puppis:

- υ^{1} Puppis (NV Puppis), a γ Cassiopeiae variable and spectroscopic binary
- υ^{2} Puppis (NW Puppis), a β Cephei variable

Neither component of this double is given a letter in Lacaille's catalogue or the British Association star catalogue. Gould gave them the designations (Latin letter) v^{1} and v^{2} Puppis, but these are rarely used. Lacaille applied the Greek letter υ to the star now called υ Carinae. The designation υ^{1} and υ^{2} first appeared in several catalogues at the end of the 19th century.
