= X Centauri =

X Centauri can refer to three different stars:

- X Centauri, a Mira variable
- x^{1} Centauri, HR 4712
- x^{2} Centauri, HR 4724

== See also ==
- χ Centauri
