= C Carinae =

The Bayer designations c Carinae and C Carinae are distinct.

- for c Carinae, see HD 76728
- for C Carinae, see HD 69863
