= Chi Hydrae =

The Bayer designation Chi Hydrae (χ Hya / χ Hydrae) is shared by two star systems in the constellation Hydra:

- χ^{1}, HR 4314
- χ^{2}, HR 4317
