= M Puppis =

The Bayer designations m Puppis and M Puppis are distinct. Due to technical limitations, both designations link here. For the star

- m Puppis, see PU Puppis
- M Puppis, see HD 57197
