= M Velorum =

The Bayer designations m Velorum and M Velorum are distinct. Due to technical limitations, both designations link here. For the star

- m Velorum, see HD 85622
- M Velorum, see HD 83446
