= M Carinae =

The Bayer designations m Carinae and M Carinae are distinct.

- for m Carinae, see HD 83944
- for M Carinae, see HD 88981
