= W Puppis =

The Bayer designations W Puppis and w Puppis, and variable star designation W Puppis, are distinct and refer to three different stars in the constellation Puppis:

- W Puppis (HR 3002, HD 62713, HIP 37664), a high-proper-motion star, a red giant star; see List of stars in Puppis
- w Puppis (HR 3282, HD 70555) an orange giant star
- W Puppis (HD 63218, HIP 37893, AAVSO 0742-41), a Mira variable star

== See also ==
- List of stars in Puppis
