= B Carinae =

The Bayer designations b Carinae and B Carinae are distinct and the designation b Carinae is shared by two stars in the constellation Carina:

- for b^{1} Carinae, see V376 Carinae
- for b^{2} Carinae, see HD 77370
- for B Carinae, see HR 3220

== See also ==
- β Carinae
