= A Hydrae =

The Bayer designations a Hydrae and A Hydrae are distinct. Due to technical limitations, both designations link here. For the star

- a Hydrae, see 6 Hydrae (HR 3431)
- A Hydrae, see 33 Hydrae (HR 3814)

== See also ==
- α Hydrae (Alphard)
