= K Carinae =

The Bayer designations k Carinae and K Carinae are distinct.

- for k Carinae, see HD 81101
- for K Carinae, see HR 4138
