= H Carinae =

The Bayer designations h Carinae and H Carinae are distinct.

- for h Carinae, see HD 83183
- for H Carinae, see HD 83095
