= Delta Gruis =

The Bayer designation δ Gruis (Delta Gruis) is shared by two stars in the constellation Grus:

- δ^{1} Gruis
- δ^{2} Gruis
