= HD 60585 =

F-type star

Observation data Epoch J2000.0 Equinox ICRS
- Constellation: Puppis
- Right ascension: 07^{h} 34^{m} 19.1^{s}
- Declination: −23° 28′ 29″
- Apparent magnitude (V): 5.87

Characteristics
- Evolutionary stage: main sequence
- Spectral type: F6

Other designations
- CD−23°5709, HD 60585, HR 2910, SAO 174020

Database references
SIMBAD	data

HD 60585, also known as HR 2910 or n Puppis B, is the secondary star of the n Puppis system. It has an apparent magnitude of 5.87 and is a binary star system with HD 60584, another F-type main sequence star.
