= N Puppis =

The Bayer designations N Puppis and n Puppis are distinct and refer to three different stars in the constellation Puppis:

- N Puppis, (HD 65551, 228 G. Puppis), a B-type main-sequence star
- n Puppis (a binary star system, refers to two stars)
  - n Puppis A, (HR 2909, HD 60584, 111 G. Puppis), an F-type main-sequence star
  - n Puppis B, (HR 2910, HD 60585, 112 G. Puppis), an F-type main-sequence star

== See also ==
- Nu Puppis
