= Zeta Librae =

Several conflated star systems in the constellation Libra

Location of the ζ Librae pair (circled)

The Bayer designation ζ Librae, Latinised as Zeta Librae (abbreviated ζ Lib / Zeta Lib) is shared by several star systems in the constellation Libra. Sources differ about the Flamsteed and Bayer designations that should be applied to four stars:

- ζ^{1} Librae (HR 5743), known as HD 137744 and 32 Librae
- ζ^{2} Librae (GZ Librae), sometimes known as 33 Librae, or as HD 137949
- ζ^{3} Librae (HR 5750), known as HD 138137 and 34 Librae
- ζ^{4} Librae (HR 5764), known as HD 138485 and 35 Librae, often simply called ζ Librae

In light of the obvious confusion, the Bright Star Catalogue recommends the use of HR designations to unambiguously identify these four stars. ζ^{2} Librae does not have an HR number although it is included in the Bright Star Catalogue Supplement.
