= HD 24160 =

Star in the constellation Eridanus

- Location of HD 24160 (circled)

Observation data Epoch J2000 Equinox ICRS
- Constellation: Eridanus
- Right ascension: 03^{h} 49^{m} 27.24527^{s}
- Declination: −36° 12′ 34.8771″
- Apparent magnitude (V): 4.17

Characteristics
- Evolutionary stage: red clump
- Spectral type: G7 III
- B−V color index: 0.927±0.045

Astrometry
Radial velocity (R_{v})	+2.0±0.7 km/s
Proper motion (μ)	RA: −45.547(77) mas/yr Dec.: −49.503(108) mas/yr
Parallax (π)	14.9781±0.0915 mas
Distance	218 ± 1 ly (66.8 ± 0.4 pc)
Absolute magnitude (M_{V})	0.13

Details
Mass	2.33 M_{☉}
Radius	11 R_{☉}
Luminosity	81.3 L_{☉}
Surface gravity (log g)	2.85±0.08 cgs
Temperature	4,948±45 K
Metallicity [Fe/H]	+0.08±0.02 dex
Age	1.76 Gyr

Other designations
- g Eri, CD−36°1467, FK5 143, HD 24160, HIP 17874, HR 1195, SAO 194559

Database references
SIMBAD	data

HD 24160 is a single star in the equatorial constellation of Eridanus. It has the Bayer designation g Eridani. It is visible to the naked eye with an apparent visual magnitude of 4.17. The distance to HD 24160 can be estimated from its annual parallax shift of 14.98 mas, yielding a separation of 218 light years. It is moving further from the Earth with a heliocentric radial velocity of +2 km/s. This object is a coronal member of the Ursa Major Moving Group of stars that share a common motion through space.

At the age of 1.76 billion years old, HD 24160 is an evolved G-type giant with a stellar classification of G7 III, having consumed the hydrogen at its core and tracked away from the main sequence. It has 2.33 times the mass of the Sun and has expanded to about 11 times the Sun's radius. The star is radiating 81.3 times the Sun's luminosity from its enlarged photosphere at an effective temperature of 4,948 K.
