= Chi Ophiuchi =

Star in the constellation Ophiuchus

- Location of χ Ophiuchi (circled in red)

Observation data Epoch J2000.0 Equinox J2000.0 (ICRS)
- Constellation: Ophiuchus
- Right ascension: 16^{h} 27^{m} 01.43557^{s}
- Declination: −18° 27′ 22.4500″
- Apparent magnitude (V): 4.22 (4.18 to 5.0)

Characteristics
- Evolutionary stage: main sequence
- Spectral type: B2Vne
- U−B color index: −0.75
- B−V color index: +0.28
- R−I color index: +0.22
- Variable type: GCAS + LERI

Astrometry
Radial velocity (R_{v})	−19.0±2.1 km/s
Proper motion (μ)	RA: −5.378 mas/yr Dec.: −22.308 mas/yr
Parallax (π)	6.5402±0.1961 mas
Distance	500 ± 10 ly (153 ± 5 pc)
Absolute magnitude (M_{V})	−2.27

Details
Mass	10.1±0.7 M_{☉}
Radius	4.44±0.09 R_{☉}
Luminosity	55,847 L_{☉}
Surface gravity (log g)	3.53±0.04 cgs
Temperature	30,000±300 K
Rotational velocity (v sin i)	150±3 km/s
Age	22.5±2.6 Myr

Other designations
- χ Oph, 7 Ophiuchi, BD−18°4282, FK5 3298, GC 22117, HD 148184, HIP 80569, HR 6118, SAO 159918, PPM 231703

Database references
SIMBAD	data

Chi Ophiuchi, Latinized from χ Ophiuchi, is a variable star in the equatorial constellation of Ophiuchus. It has a blue-white hue and is faintly visible to the naked eye with an apparent visual magnitude that fluctuates around 4.22. The distance to this object, as determined from parallax measurements, is approximately 500 light years, but it is moving closer to the Sun with a radial velocity of −19 km/s. This star is a proper motion member of the Upper Scorpius sub-group in the Scorpius–Centaurus OB association; the nearest such co-moving association of massive stars to the Sun.

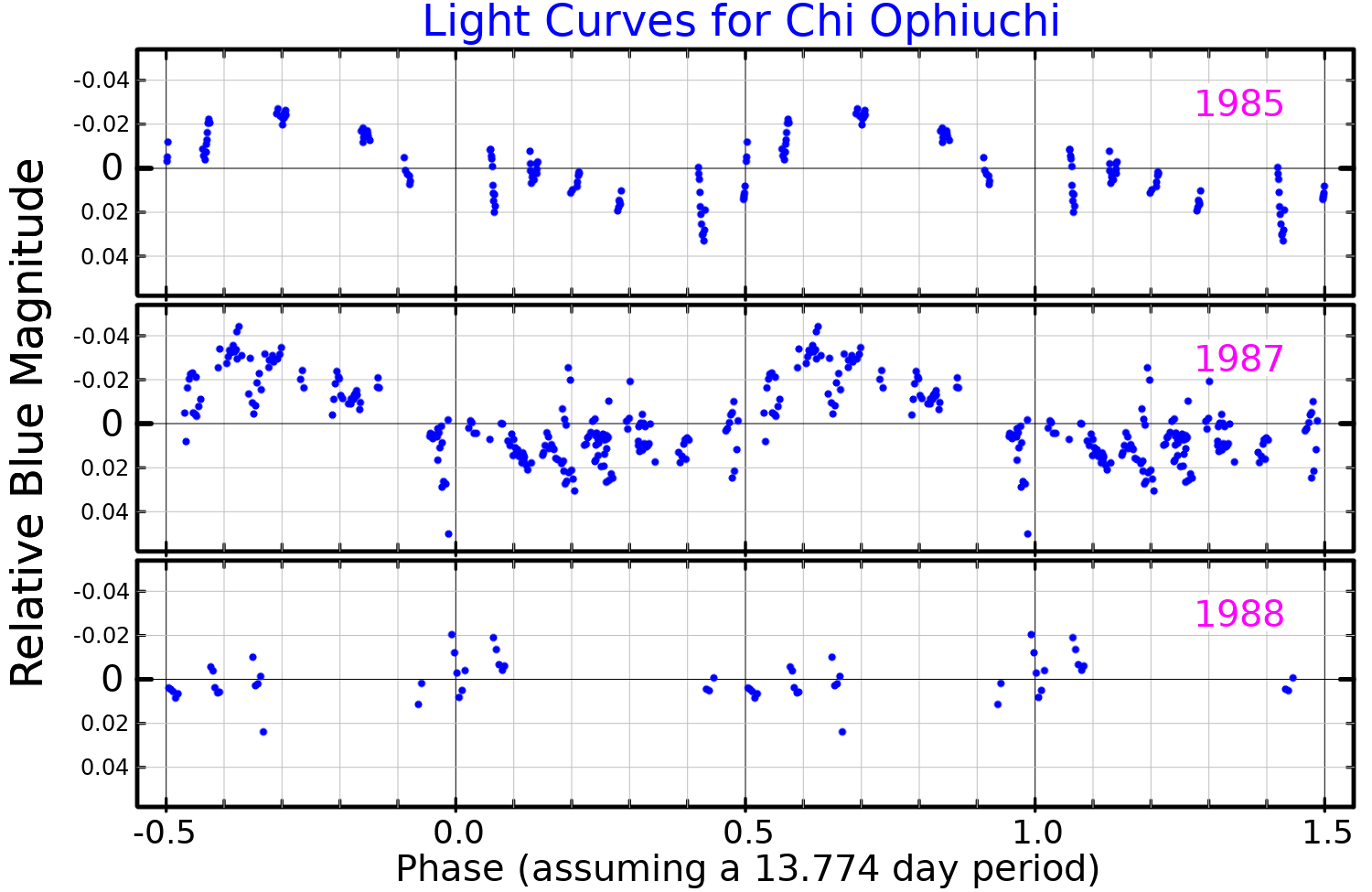
A blue-light light curve for Chi Ophiuchi, adapted from Cuypers et al. (1989)

This is a massive Be star with a stellar classification of B2Vne, where the 'n' indicates "nebulous" lines due to rapid rotation. It is spinning with a projected rotational velocity of 144 km/s. As the critical velocity for the star is 477 km/s, the inclination angle of its poles must be small; estimated as ~20°. It is a Gamma Cassiopeiae variable with an amplitude of 0.15 magnitude. The brightness has been measured varying from magnitude 4.18 down to 5.0.

Chi Ophiuchi is 22.5 million years old with 10.1 times the mass of the Sun. It has four times the Sun's radius and is radiating 56,000 times the luminosity of the Sun from its photosphere at an effective temperature of about 30,000 K. A weak magnetic field has been detected in the chromosphere of this star. It is being orbited by a symmetrical disk of ejected gas extending out to 0.52 AU (112 R_{☉}), and excess radio and infrared emission has been detected from this structure.

Abt and Levy (1978) cataloged Chi Ophiuchi as a single-lined spectroscopic binary with a period of 138.8 days and an eccentricity of 0.44, although the orbital elements are considered marginal. Eggleton and Tokovinin (2008) list it as a single star.
