= Xi Arietis =

Star in the constellation Aries

ξ Arietis
Observation data Epoch J2000.0 Equinox J2000.0 (ICRS)
- Constellation: Aries
- Right ascension: 02^{h} 24^{m} 49.058^{s}
- Declination: +10° 36′ 38.01″
- Apparent magnitude (V): +5.46

Characteristics
- Spectral type: B7 IV
- U−B color index: −0.48
- B−V color index: −0.10

Astrometry
Radial velocity (R_{v})	−0.5±2.8 km/s
Proper motion (μ)	RA: +20.979 mas/yr Dec.: −15.022 mas/yr
Parallax (π)	4.2483±0.1511 mas
Distance	770 ± 30 ly (235 ± 8 pc)
Absolute magnitude (M_{V})	−0.43

Details
Mass	4.85±0.13 M_{☉}
Luminosity	1,000^{+186}_{−157} L_{☉}
Surface gravity (log g)	3.897±0.017 cgs
Temperature	13,627±100 K
Rotational velocity (v sin i)	164±8 km/s
Age	195 Myr

Other designations
- ξ Ari, ψ Ceti, 24 Arietis, BD+09°316, FK5 2164, GC 2901, HD 14951, HIP 11249, HR 702, SAO 92932, PPM 118200

Database references
SIMBAD	data

Xi Arietis is a binary star system in the northern constellation of Aries. Its name is a Bayer designation that is Latinized from ξ Arietis, and abbreviated Xi Ari or ξ Ari. This system has an apparent visual magnitude of 5.46, and so is dimly visible to the naked eye. Based upon an annual parallax shift of 3.74±0.29 mas as seen from Earth, it is 770 ± 30 light-years (236.1 ± 9.2 parsecs) distant from the Sun. At that distance, the visual magnitude is diminished by an extinction factor of 0.24 due to interstellar dust. The proximity of this system to the ecliptic means it is subject to lunar occultations.

This is a double-lined spectroscopic binary. The spectrum matches a stellar classification of B7 IV, which suggests a subgiant star that has exhausted the supply of hydrogen at its core and is in the process of evolving into a giant star. Xi Arietis was once a designation for Psi Ceti (ψ Cet, ψ Ceti), and was later recognized to be a duplicate by Bayer.
