= N Herculis =

Star in the Hercules constellation

n Herculis
Observation data Epoch J2000.0 Equinox J2000.0
- Constellation: Hercules
- Right ascension: 16^{h} 32^{m} 35.7^{s}
- Declination: +5° 31′ 16″
- Apparent magnitude (V): 5.63

Characteristics
- Evolutionary stage: main sequence
- Spectral type: B9.5III
- U−B color index: −0.18
- B−V color index: −0.06

Astrometry
Radial velocity (R_{v})	−23.38±0.21 km/s
Proper motion (μ)	RA: +15.556 mas/yr Dec.: −0.282 mas/yr
Parallax (π)	8.5519±0.1394 mas
Distance	381 ± 6 ly (117 ± 2 pc)
Absolute magnitude (M_{V})	+0.27

Details
Mass	2.75 M_{☉}
Radius	2.94 R_{☉}
Luminosity	99 L_{☉}
Surface gravity (log g)	3.94 cgs
Temperature	10,623 K
Rotational velocity (v sin i)	9.6 km/s
Age	237 Myr

Other designations
- 28 Herculis, BD+05°3223, HD 149121, HIP 81007, HR 6158, SAO 121676

Database references
SIMBAD	data

n Herculis, also known as 28 Herculis, is a mercury-manganese star in the constellation Hercules at a distance of approximately 381 light-years (about 117 parsecs) from the Sun. The apparent magnitude of the star is +5.6. Once in the constellation Ophiuchus, it was also catalogued as 11 Ophiuchi.
