= V415 Carinae =

Star in the constellation Carina

- Location of A Carinae (circled)

Observation data Epoch J2000.0 Equinox J2000.0 (ICRS)
- Constellation: Carina
- Right ascension: 06^{h} 49^{m} 51.31414^{s}
- Declination: −53° 37′ 20.8182″
- Apparent magnitude (V): +4.40

Characteristics
- Spectral type: G6II + A1V
- U−B color index: +0.61
- B−V color index: +0.92
- R−I color index: +0.45
- Variable type: EA

Astrometry
Radial velocity (R_{v})	26.0 ± 0.9 km/s
Proper motion (μ)	RA: −1.99 mas/yr Dec.: 17.58 mas/yr
Parallax (π)	5.99±0.18 mas
Distance	182 pc
Absolute magnitude (M_{V})	–1.58

Orbit
Period (P)	195.245 days
Eccentricity (e)	0.00585
Inclination (i)	82.7°
Semi-amplitude (K_{1}) (primary)	24.2535 km/s
Semi-amplitude (K_{2}) (secondary)	38.6 km/s

Details

A
Mass	3.14 M_{☉}
Radius	31.3 R_{☉}
Luminosity	537 L_{☉}
Surface gravity (log g)	1.94 cgs
Temperature	4,981 K

B
Mass	1.98 M_{☉}
Radius	1.9 R_{☉}
Luminosity	25 L_{☉}
Surface gravity (log g)	4,18 cgs
Temperature	9,388 K
Metallicity	−0.04

Other designations
- A Carinae, V415 Car, CCDM J06499-5337, CD−53°1613, CPD−53°1168, GC 8972, GSC 08536-00794, HD 50337, HIP 32761, HR 2554, PPM 335506, SAO 234737, TYC 8536-794-1

Database references
SIMBAD	data

V415 Carinae, also known as HR 2554 and A Carinae, is an eclipsing spectroscopic binary of the Algol type in the constellation of Carina whose apparent visual magnitude varies by 0.06 magnitude and is approximately 4.39 at maximum brightness. It is easily visible to the naked eye of a person far from brightly-lit urban ares. Its primary is a G-type bright giant star and its secondary is an A-type main-sequence star. It is approximately 553 light-years from Earth.

It had the bayer designation B Puppis by Nicolas Louis de Lacaille before Benjamin Gould included it in Carina and redesignated as such.

== HR 2554 A ==
The primary component, HR 2554 A, is a yellow G-type bright giant with a mean apparent magnitude of +4.4.

== HR 2554 B ==
The secondary component, HR 2554 B, is a white A-type main-sequence dwarf, about three magnitudes fainter than the primary.

== HR 2554 binary system ==
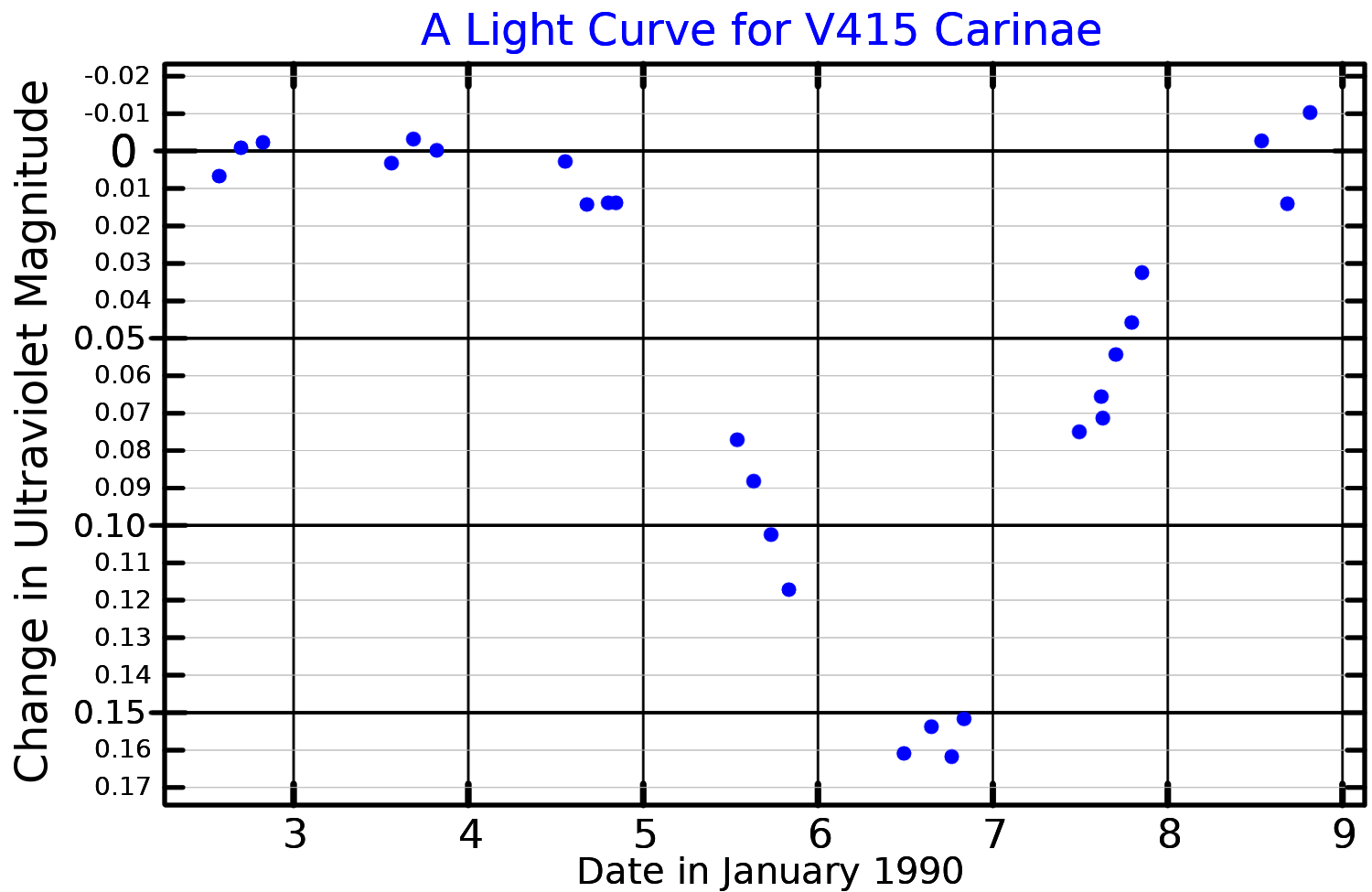
A U band light curve for V415 Carinae, adapted from Schröder and Hünsch (1992)

HR 2554 has two components in orbit around each other, making it a binary star. The semi-major axis of the secondary's orbit is 2.17 arcseconds. Thomas B. Ake and Sidney B. Parsons discovered that HR 2554 is a variable star, in 1986. It was given its variable star designation, V415 Carinae, in 1989. The two components regularly eclipse each other. The system's brightness varies by 0.06 magnitude with a period equal to its orbital period of 195 days.
