= Iota Gruis =

Star in the constellation Grus

- Location of ι Gruis (circled in red)

Observation data Epoch J2000.0 Equinox J2000.0 (ICRS)
- Constellation: Grus
- Right ascension: 23^{h} 10^{m} 21.53755^{s}
- Declination: −45° 14′ 48.1647″
- Apparent magnitude (V): 3.90

Characteristics
- Spectral type: K1 III
- U−B color index: +0.86
- B−V color index: +1.02

Astrometry
Radial velocity (R_{v})	−4.4 km/s
Proper motion (μ)	RA: +132.50 mas/yr Dec.: −26.66 mas/yr
Parallax (π)	17.80±0.33 mas
Distance	183 ± 3 ly (56 ± 1 pc)
Absolute magnitude (M_{V})	+0.13

Orbit
Period (P)	409.614 d
Semi-major axis (a)	7.82±0.47 mas
Eccentricity (e)	0.66
Inclination (i)	114.3±5.2°
Periastron epoch (T)	2416115.569 JD
Argument of periastron (ω) (secondary)	240.8°
Semi-amplitude (K_{1}) (primary)	13.6 km/s

Details

ι Gru A
Mass	2.97±0.16 M_{☉}
Radius	12.38±0.53 R_{☉}
Luminosity	83.9±5.5 L_{☉}
Surface gravity (log g)	2.709±0.143 cgs
Temperature	4,966±69 K
Metallicity [Fe/H]	+0.150±0.054 dex

Other designations
- ι Gru, CD−45°14947, FK5 1605, HD 218670, HIP 114421, HR 8820, SAO 231468

Database references
SIMBAD	data

Iota Gruis, Latinized from ι Gruis, is a binary star system in the southern constellation of Grus. It has an apparent visual magnitude of 3.90, which is bright enough to be seen with the naked eye at night. The distance to this system, as determined using an annual parallax shift of 17.80 mas as seen from the Earth, is about 183 light years.

This is a single-lined spectroscopic binary with an orbital period of 409.6 days (1.121 years) and an eccentricity of 0.66. The yellow-hued primary component is an evolved K-type giant star with a stellar classification of K1 III. It is an X-ray emitter with a flux of 441.31×10^{−17} W/m^{2}.
