= NV Puppis =

Star in the constellation Puppis

- Location of NV Puppis (circled)

Observation data Epoch J2000 Equinox ICRS
- Constellation: Puppis
- Right ascension: 07^{h} 18^{m} 18.39335^{s}
- Declination: −36° 44′ 02.2329″
- Apparent magnitude (V): 4.67

Characteristics
- Spectral type: B2V+B3IVne
- U−B color index: −0.79
- B−V color index: −0.10
- Variable type: γ Cas

Astrometry
Radial velocity (R_{v})	+18.60 km/s
Proper motion (μ)	RA: −10.25 mas/yr Dec.: +5.82 mas/yr
Parallax (π)	4.06±0.18 mas
Distance	800 ± 40 ly (250 ± 10 pc)
Absolute magnitude (M_{V})	−2.31

Details
Mass	10.1 M_{☉}
Radius	8.4 R_{☉}
Luminosity	12,300 L_{☉}
Surface gravity (log g)	4.00 cgs
Temperature	24,380 K
Metallicity [Fe/H]	0.00 dex
Rotation	0.466 days
Rotational velocity (v sin i)	254 km/s

Other designations
- Upsilon^{1} Puppis, Upsilon^{1} Pup, υ^{1} Puppis, υ^{1} Pup, NV Puppis, NV Pup, CD−36°3512, CCDM J07184-3645A, GC 9733, GSC 07115-03016, HIP 35363, HR 2787, HD 57150, SAO 197824, WDS J07183-3644A

Database references
SIMBAD	data

NV Puppis (NV Pup), also known as υ^{1} Puppis, is a class B2V (blue main-sequence) star in the constellation Puppis. Its apparent magnitude is 4.67 and it is approximately 800 light years away based on parallax.

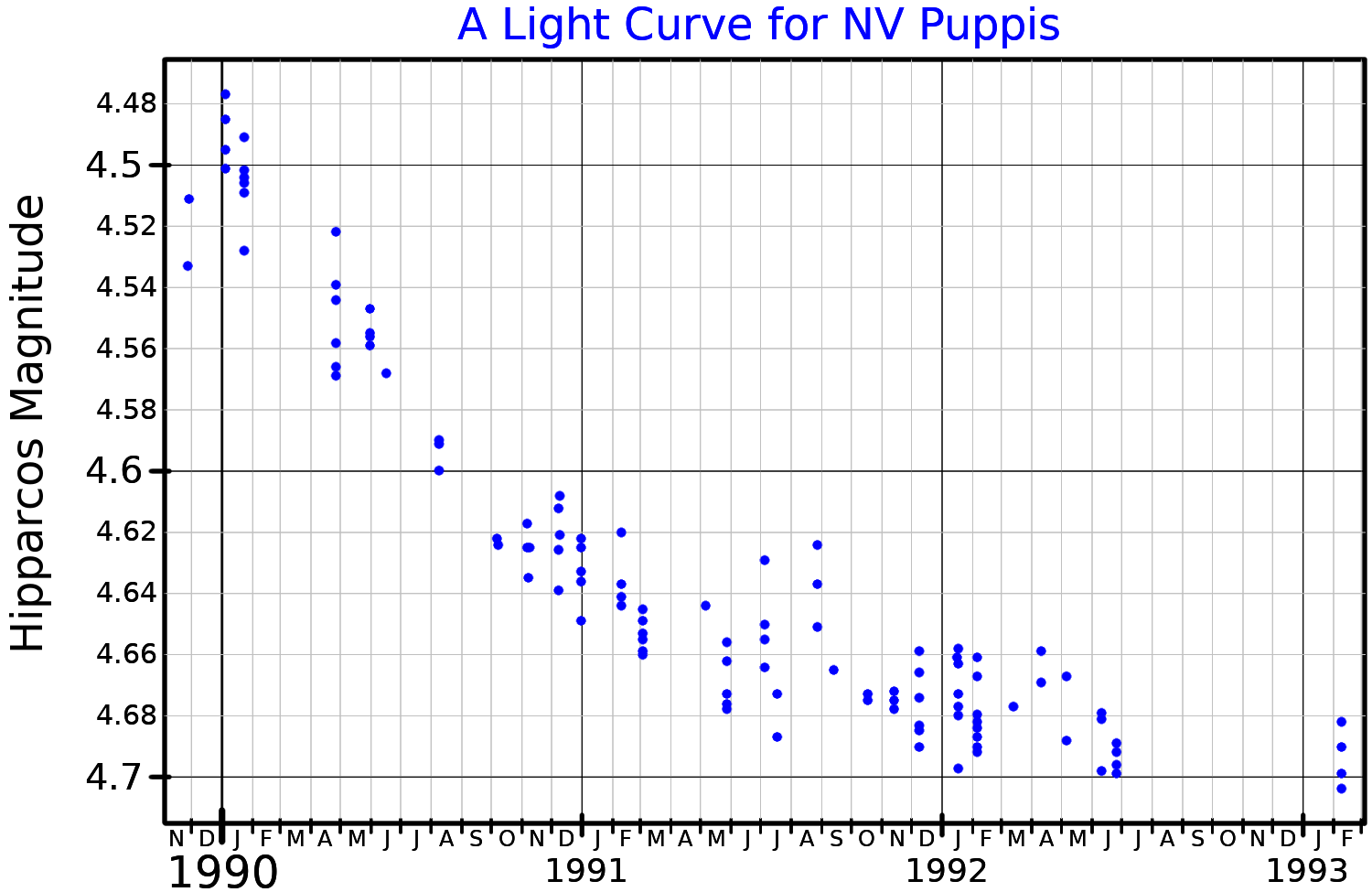
A light curve for NV Puppis, plotted from Hipparcos data

It is a γ Cas variable, ranging from 4.78 to 4.58 magnitude. It is most likely an optical double with the nearby NW Puppis.

Neither component of this double is given a letter in Lacaille's catalogue or the British Association star catalogue. Gould gave them the designations (Latin letter) v^{1} and v^{2} Puppis, but these are rarely used. Lacaille applied the Greek letter υ to the star now called υ Carinae. The designation υ^{1} first appeared in several catalogues at the end of the 19th century.
