= HD 96919 =

Variable star in the constellation Carina

V371 Carinae
- Location of V371 Carinae (circled)

Observation data Epoch J2000 Equinox ICRS
- Constellation: Carina
- Right ascension: 11^{h} 08^{m} 33.99848^{s}
- Declination: −61° 56′ 49.8316″
- Apparent magnitude (V): 5.19 (5.12 - 5.19)

Characteristics
- Spectral type: B9 Iae
- U−B color index: −0.46
- B−V color index: +0.23
- Variable type: α Cyg

Astrometry
Radial velocity (R_{v})	−22.4 ± 2 km/s
Proper motion (μ)	RA: −5.78 mas/yr Dec.: 1.74 mas/yr
Parallax (π)	0.23±0.25 mas
Distance	1,920 pc
Absolute magnitude (M_{V})	−7.0

Details
Mass	23 M_{☉}
Radius	141 R_{☉}
Luminosity	105,000 L_{☉}
Surface gravity (log g)	1.50 cgs
Temperature	12,500 K
Rotational velocity (v sin i)	60 km/s

Other designations
- z^{2} Carinae, V371 Carinae, 261 G. Carinae, CD−61°2941, CPD−61°2075, CPC 20.1 3080, FK5 2891, GC 15331, GCRV 6856, GSC 08962-02640, HD 96919, HIC 54461, HIP 54461, HR 4338, PPM 358516, SAO 251286

Database references
SIMBAD	data

HD 96919, also known by its Bayer designation of z^{2} Carinae and the variable star designation of V371 Carinae, is a blue supergiant star in the constellation Carina. It lies near the Carina Nebula and at a comparable distance. A 5th magnitude star, it is visible to the naked eye under good observing conditions.

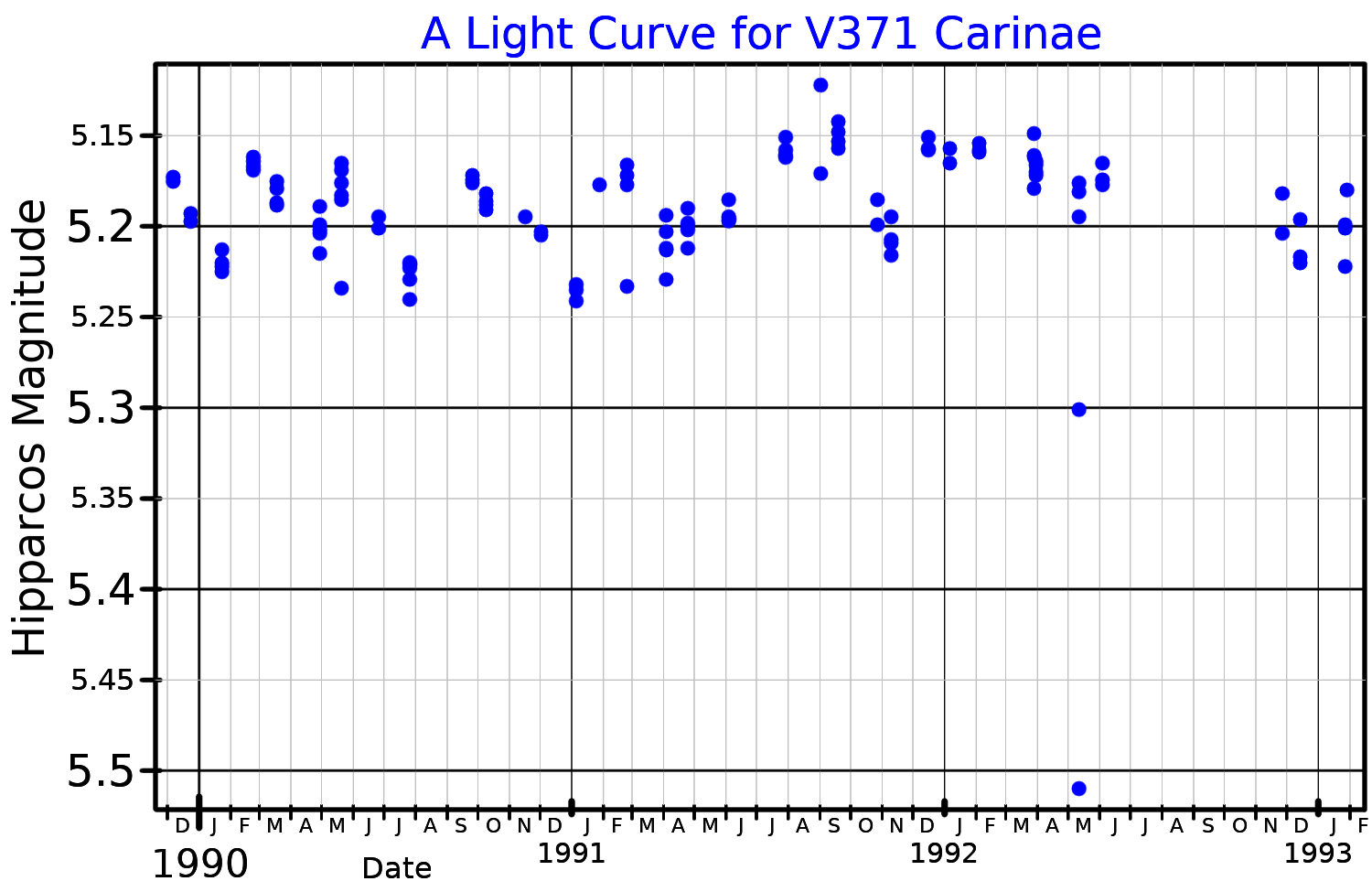
A light curve for V371 Carinae, plotted from Hipparcos data

In 1977, Christiaan Sterken announced his discovery that HD 96919 is a variable star. It was given its variable star designation in 1979. V371 Car is an α Cyg variable, erratically pulsating and changing brightness by a few hundredths of a magnitude. Periods of 10–80 days have been identified. It shows unusual emission lines in its spectrum, and high-velocity absorption (HVA) events, temporary spectral features that are thought to indicate localised regions of enhanced mass loss.

HD 96919 is a B9 supergiant, possibly located 6,000 light-years from Earth. It is considered to be a post-red supergiant star, either evolving towards a Wolf–Rayet star or on a blue loop before returning to a cooler temperature.
