= HD 60584 =

F-type star

Observation data Epoch J2000.0 Equinox ICRS
- Constellation: Puppis
- Right ascension: 07^{h} 34^{m} 18.6^{s}
- Declination: −23° 28′ 25″
- Apparent magnitude (V): 5.83

Characteristics
- Evolutionary stage: main sequence
- Spectral type: F4
- U−B color index: 0.03
- B−V color index: 0.44

Other designations
- n Puppis A, 111 G. Puppis, CD−23°5709, HD 60584, HR 2909, SAO 174019

Database references
SIMBAD	data

HD 60584, also known as HR 2909 or n Puppis A, is the primary star of the n Puppis system. It has an apparent magnitude of 5.83 and forms a binary star system with HD 60585, another F-type main sequence star.

A brown dwarf companion was discovered in 2022 with the help of direct imaging.

The HD 60584 planetary system
Companion (in order from star)	Mass	Semimajor axis (AU)	Orbital period (days)	Eccentricity	Inclination (°)	Radius
b	28.0±9.0 M_{J}	16.58±0.15	—	0.0312+0.0071 −0.0073	—	—
