= Iota1 Librae =

Multiple star system in the constellation Libra

Iota^{1} Librae
- Location of ι^{1} Librae (circled in red)

Observation data Epoch J2000 Equinox ICRS
- Constellation: Libra
- Right ascension: 15^{h} 12^{m} 13.29025^{s}
- Declination: −19° 47′ 30.1592″
- Apparent magnitude (V): +4.54 (5.1 + 5.6 + 10.4 + 10.9)

Characteristics
- Spectral type: B9IVpSi + B9 + G5IV
- U−B color index: −0.38
- B−V color index: −0.08
- Variable type: Alpha2 Canum Venaticorum

Astrometry
Radial velocity (R_{v})	−11.6 km/s
Proper motion (μ)	RA: −35.40 mas/yr Dec.: −32.79 mas/yr
Parallax (π)	8.59±0.25 mas
Distance	380 ± 10 ly (116 ± 3 pc)
Absolute magnitude (M_{V})	−0.79

Position (relative to A)
Component	BC
Angular distance	57.8″
Position angle	111°

Orbit
Primary	Aa
Name	Ab
Period (P)	23.512±0.026 yr
Semi-major axis (a)	0.12932±0.00064″
Eccentricity (e)	0.2440±0.0029
Inclination (i)	154.2±1.0°
Longitude of the node (Ω)	173.8±2.3°
Periastron epoch (T)	1971.034±0.076
Argument of periastron (ω) (secondary)	340.1±2.8°
Semi-amplitude (K_{1}) (primary)	3.4 km/s

Position (relative to B)
Component	C
Angular distance	2.058″
Position angle	111°

Details

Aa
Mass	3.61 M_{☉}

Ab
Mass	3.12 M_{☉}

B
Mass	0.98 M_{☉}

C
Mass	0.91 M_{☉}

Other designations
- ι^{1} Lib, 24 Librae, BD−19°4047, HD 134759, HIP 74392, HR 5652, SAO 159090, WDS J15122-1948A

Database references
SIMBAD	data

Iota^{1} Librae is a quadruple star system in the constellation Libra. Its name is a Bayer designation that is Latinized from ι^{1} Librae, and abbreviated Iota^{1} Lib or ι^{1} Lib. Its apparent magnitude is 4.54. It is located 379 light years from earth.

== Visibility ==
Due to its southern location, although the star can be seen from most regions of the earth, observers in the southern hemisphere are more advantaged. Near Antarctica, it appears circumpolar, while it always remains invisible only in the vicinity of the Arctic Circle. Its magnitude of 4.5 means that naked eye visibility is dependent on a sky sufficiently free from the effects of light pollution.

The best time for observation in the evening sky falls in the months between May and September; from both hemispheres of the period of visibility remains approximately the same, thanks to the position of the star not far from the celestial equator.

== Physical ==
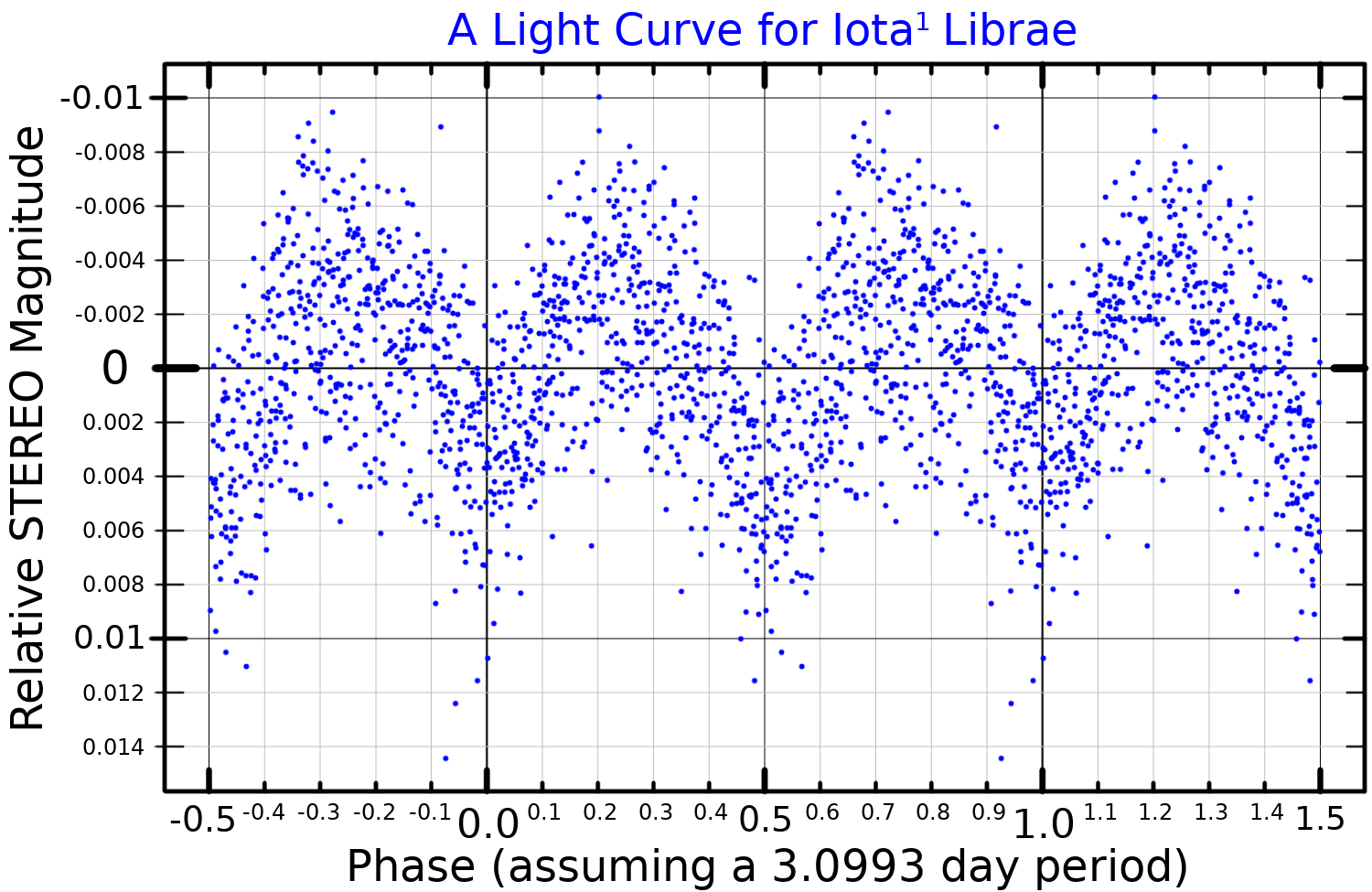
A light curve for Iota^{1} Librae plotted from STEREO data, adapted from Wraight et al. (2012)

Iota^{1} Librae is a quadruple star system. The inner pair, designated components Aa and Ab, form a spectroscopic binary with an orbital period of 23.512 years and an eccentricity of 0.2440. The brighter member has a stellar classification of B9 IVp Si, indicating it is a B-type subgiant star with an overabundance of silicon in the photosphere. It is a variable star of the Alpha2 Canum Venaticorum type with a magnitude that varies from 4.53 to 4.56, while its spectrum likewise shows variability. The secondary component is of class B9. The two stars are very close together (0.129 arcsec away), respectively of magnitude 5.10 and 5.60.

The two other stars are the components C and D; separated by 57.8" from AB and 2.058" from each other. The combined spectrum is G5IV, and each star has masses of 0.98 and 0.91 solar masses, and magnitudes 10.40 and 10.90, respectively.

Due to its position on the ecliptic, it is sometimes obscured by the Moon or planets. A lunar occultation took place April 4, 2012.
