= N Scorpii =

Star in the constellation of Scorpius

- Location of N Scorpii on the map

Observation data Epoch J2000 Equinox J2000
- Constellation: Scorpius
- Right ascension: 16^{h} 31^{m} 22.93300^{s}
- Declination: −34° 42′ 15.7146″
- Apparent magnitude (V): 4.23

Characteristics
- Spectral type: B2 III-IV
- U−B color index: −0.76
- B−V color index: −0.17
- Variable type: candidate β Cephei

Astrometry
| Radial velocity (R_{v}) | 0.8±1.5 km/s |
| Proper motion (μ) | RA: −12.05±0.20 mas/yr Dec.: −18.16±0.13 mas/yr |
| Parallax (π) | 5.88±0.19 mas |
| Distance | 550 ± 20 ly (170 ± 5 pc) |
| Absolute magnitude (M_{V}) | −1.91 |

Details
| Mass | 7.8±0.1 M_{☉} |
| Radius | 6.25 R_{☉} |
| Luminosity (bolometric) | 6,918 L_{☉} |
| Surface gravity (log g) | 4.0 cgs |
| Temperature | 21,877 K |
| Metallicity [Fe/H] | +0.01 dex |
| Rotational velocity (v sin i) | 70±8 km/s |
| Age | 22±4 Myr |

Other designations
- N Scorpii, 72 G. Scorpii, CD−34°11044, CPD−34°6528, FK5 1431, GC 22195, HD 148703, HIP 80911, HR 6143, SAO 207732

Database references
| SIMBAD | data |

N Scorpii, also known as HD 148703, is a solitary, bluish-white hued star located in the southern constellation Scorpius. It has an apparent magnitude of 4.23, making it readily visible to the naked eye. N Scorpii was initially given the Bayer designation Alpha Normae by Lacaille but it was later moved from Norma to Scorpius. N Scorpii is currently located 550 light years away based on parallax measurements from the Hipparcos satellite and is part of the Upper Scorpius–Centaurus region of the Scorpius–Centaurus association.

N Scorpii has been given several stellar classifications over the years. It has been given the luminosity class of a main sequence star (V), a subgiant (IV), an evolved giant star (III), or a blend between the last two classes (III-IV). It is generally classified as either a B2 or B3 star several times hotter than the Sun. HD 148703 is a candidate β Cephei variable and its variability was first noticed in 1983 by C. Sterken. Further observations were made by Abt et al. (2002) by observing its projected rotational velocity. It was identified as a candidate in 2002 in a survey for non-radial pulsations in B-type stars.

The object has two generally accepted classes: B2 III-IV and B2 IV. It has 7.8 times the mass of the Sun and 6.25 times its size. It has a bolometric luminosity 6,918 times greater than the Sun from its photosphere at an effective temperature of 21,877 K. N Scorpii is estimated to be 22 million years old, which is twice the average age of the aforementioned association. Like most hot stars, N Scorpii spins rapidly, having a projected rotational velocity of 70 km/s.
