= H Eridani =

Star in the constellation Eridanus

HD 23319
- Location of h Eri (circled)

Observation data Epoch J2000 Equinox ICRS
- Constellation: Eridanus
- Right ascension: 03^{h} 42^{m} 50.0549^{s}
- Declination: −37° 18′ 48.661″
- Apparent magnitude (V): 4.59

Characteristics
- Evolutionary stage: red clump
- Spectral type: K1.5 IIIb CN0.5
- B−V color index: 1.191±0.002

Astrometry
Radial velocity (R_{v})	+9.90±0.07 km/s
Proper motion (μ)	RA: −91.264(70) mas/yr Dec.: −70.315(85) mas/yr
Parallax (π)	18.5379±0.0757 mas
Distance	175.9 ± 0.7 ly (53.9 ± 0.2 pc)
Absolute magnitude (M_{V})	0.83

Details
Mass	1.42±0.09 M_{☉}
Radius	11.38±0.07 R_{☉}
Luminosity	51.52±0.67 L_{☉}
Surface gravity (log g)	2.56±0.05 cgs
Temperature	4,592±14 K
Metallicity [Fe/H]	+0.03±0.06 dex
Rotational velocity (v sin i)	1.70±0.43 km/s
Age	3.17±0.42 Gyr

Other designations
- h Eri, CD−37°1415, FK5 2265, HD 23319, HIP 17351, HR 1143, SAO 194475

Database references
SIMBAD	data

h Eridani (HD 23319) is an orange-hued star in the constellation Eridanus. It has an apparent visual magnitude of 4.59, which make it faintly visible to the naked eye in skies with low light pollution. The distance to HD 23319 can be estimated from its annual parallax shift of 18.5 mas, which yields a distance of about 176 light years. It is moving further away from the Earth with a heliocentric radial velocity of +9.9 km/s.

This is an aging giant star with a stellar classification of K1.5 IIIb CN0.5, where the suffix notation indicates the spectrum shows a mild overabundance of the cyano radical. It is a red clump giant, indicating it is on the horizontal branch and is generating energy through helium fusion at its core. The star has 1.4 times the mass of the Sun and, at the age of 3.2 billion years, has expanded to 11 times the Sun's radius. It is radiating 51 times the Sun's luminosity from its enlarged photosphere at an effective temperature of 4,592 K.

h Eridani has two visible companions, a 12th-magnitude star 5″ away and a 16th-magnitude star 84″ away. They are much too far apart to show any orbital motion, but have similar parallaxes and proper motions. The 12th-magnitude companion may itself be a spectroscopic binary.

== See also ==
- List of stars in Eridanus
- Stellar classification
- Red clump
- Horizontal branch
