= 3 Corvi =

Star in the constellation Corvus

Observation data Epoch J2000.0 Equinox ICRS
- Constellation: Corvus
- Right ascension: 12^{h} 11^{m} 03.83987^{s}
- Declination: −23° 36′ 08.7221″
- Apparent magnitude (V): 5.45

Characteristics
- Evolutionary stage: main sequence
- Spectral type: A1 V
- B−V color index: 0.055±0.004

Astrometry
Radial velocity (R_{v})	+14.41±1.09 km/s
Proper motion (μ)	RA: −66.853 mas/yr Dec.: −19.826 mas/yr
Parallax (π)	17.0039±0.1918 mas
Distance	192 ± 2 ly (58.8 ± 0.7 pc)
Absolute magnitude (M_{V})	1.61

Details
Mass	2.14 M_{☉}
Radius	1.87 R_{☉}
Luminosity	9.55+1.17 −1.04 L_{☉}
Surface gravity (log g)	4.12±0.22 cgs
Temperature	9,671±329 K
Metallicity [Fe/H]	+0.17±0.41 dex
Rotational velocity (v sin i)	130 km/s
Age	900+90 −900 Myr

Other designations
- 3 Crv, BD+22°3305, HD 105850, HIP 59394, HR 4635, SAO 180546

Database references
SIMBAD	data

3 Corvi is a single star in the southern constellation of Corvus, located 192 light years away from the Sun. It is visible to the naked eye as a faint, white-hued star with an apparent visual magnitude of 5.45. This object is moving further from the Earth with a heliocentric radial velocity of +14 km/s.

This is an A-type main-sequence star with a stellar classification of A1 V. It has 2.14 times the mass of the Sun and 1.87 times the Sun's radius. The star is around 900 million years old with a high rate of rotation, showing a projected rotational velocity of 130 km/s. It is radiating ten times the luminosity of the Sun from its photosphere at an effective temperature of 9,671 K. An infrared excess has been detected, suggesting that a debris disk with a temperature of 150 K is orbiting 14.7 AU from the host star.

It was designated Theta Corvi by Johann Elert Bode in his 1801 Uranographia, but it is now no longer used.
