= C Hydrae =

Star in the constellation Hydra

- Location of C Hydrae (circled)

Observation data Epoch J2000 Equinox ICRS
- Constellation: Hydra
- Right ascension: 08^{h} 25^{m} 39.63201^{s}
- Declination: −03° 54′ 23.1178″
- Apparent magnitude (V): 3.90

Characteristics
- Evolutionary stage: main sequence
- Spectral type: A0 Va
- B−V color index: −0.012±0.003

Astrometry
| Radial velocity (R_{v}) | +10.00±1.78 km/s |
| Proper motion (μ) | RA: −66.43 mas/yr Dec.: −23.41 mas/yr |
| Parallax (π) | 26.66±0.19 mas |
| Distance | 122.3 ± 0.9 ly (37.5 ± 0.3 pc) |
| Absolute magnitude (M_{V}) | 1.04 |

Details
| Mass | 2.3 M_{☉} |
| Radius | 2.5 R_{☉} |
| Luminosity | 37 L_{☉} |
| Surface gravity (log g) | 4.20 cgs |
| Temperature | 9,074 K |
| Metallicity [Fe/H] | −0.04 dex |
| Rotational velocity (v sin i) | 129 km/s |
| Age | 162 Myr |

Other designations
- C Hya, 30 Mon, BD−03°2339, HD 71155, HIP 41307, HR 3314, SAO 135896

Database references
| SIMBAD | data |

C Hydrae is a single star in the equatorial constellation of Hydra, located 122 light years away from the Sun. It has the Flamsteed designation 30 Monocerotis, assigned when it belonged to the constellation Monoceros. The object is visible to the naked eye as a white-hued star with an apparent visual magnitude of 3.90. It is moving away from the Earth with a heliocentric radial velocity of +10 km/s.

This is an A-type main-sequence star with a stellar classification of A0 Va. It is around 162 million years old with a high rate of spin, showing a projected rotational velocity of 129 km/s. The star has 2.3 times the mass of the Sun and about 2.5 times the Sun's radius. It is radiating 37 times the luminosity of the Sun from its photosphere at an effective temperature of 9,074 K.

A statistically significant infrared excess has been detected, indicating a debris disk is orbiting 2.0±0.1 AU from the host star with a blackbody temperature of 499±3 K. It is comparable in size to the asteroid belt. Unexplained X-ray emission has also been detected coming from these coordinates – stars of this class are not normally expected to show X-ray emission, so it may be coming from a background source or an unseen companion.
