= H Scorpii =

Star in the constellation Scorpius

- Location of H Scorpii (circled in red)

Observation data Epoch J2000.0 Equinox J2000.0 (ICRS)
- Constellation: Scorpius
- Right ascension: 16^{h} 36^{m} 22.47192^{s}
- Declination: −35° 15′ 19.1803″
- Apparent magnitude (V): 4.18

Characteristics
- Evolutionary stage: giant
- Spectral type: K6III
- B−V color index: 1.535±0.069

Astrometry
Radial velocity (R_{v})	−2.10±0.7 km/s
Proper motion (μ)	RA: 15.61±0.17 mas/yr Dec.: 11.33±0.14 mas/yr
Parallax (π)	9.52±0.16 mas
Distance	343 ± 6 ly (105 ± 2 pc)
Absolute magnitude (M_{V})	−0.84±0.037

Details
Mass	1.06+0.74 −0.28 M_{☉} 1.81 M_{☉}
Radius	52.79±5.47 R_{☉}
Luminosity	389 L_{☉} 562 L_{☉} 582±147 L_{☉}
Surface gravity (log g)	1.30±0.15 cgs
Temperature	3,875±21 K
Metallicity [Fe/H]	0.00±0.20 dex −0.30 dex
Rotational velocity (v sin i)	3.1 km/s
Age	2.18 Gyr

Other designations
- H Sco, NSV 7844, CD−34°11112, GC 22311, HD 149447, HIP 81304, HR 6166, SAO 207814, PPM 295235

Database references
SIMBAD	data

H Scorpii (H Sco) is a single star in the southern constellation Scorpius. It is faintly visible to the naked eye with an apparent visual magnitude of 4.18. The star is located at a distance of approximately 343 light-years from the Sun based on parallax measurements, but is drifting closer with a radial velocity of −2 km/s. This star was initially given the Bayer designation Beta Normae by Lacaille but it was later reassigned from Norma to Scorpius.

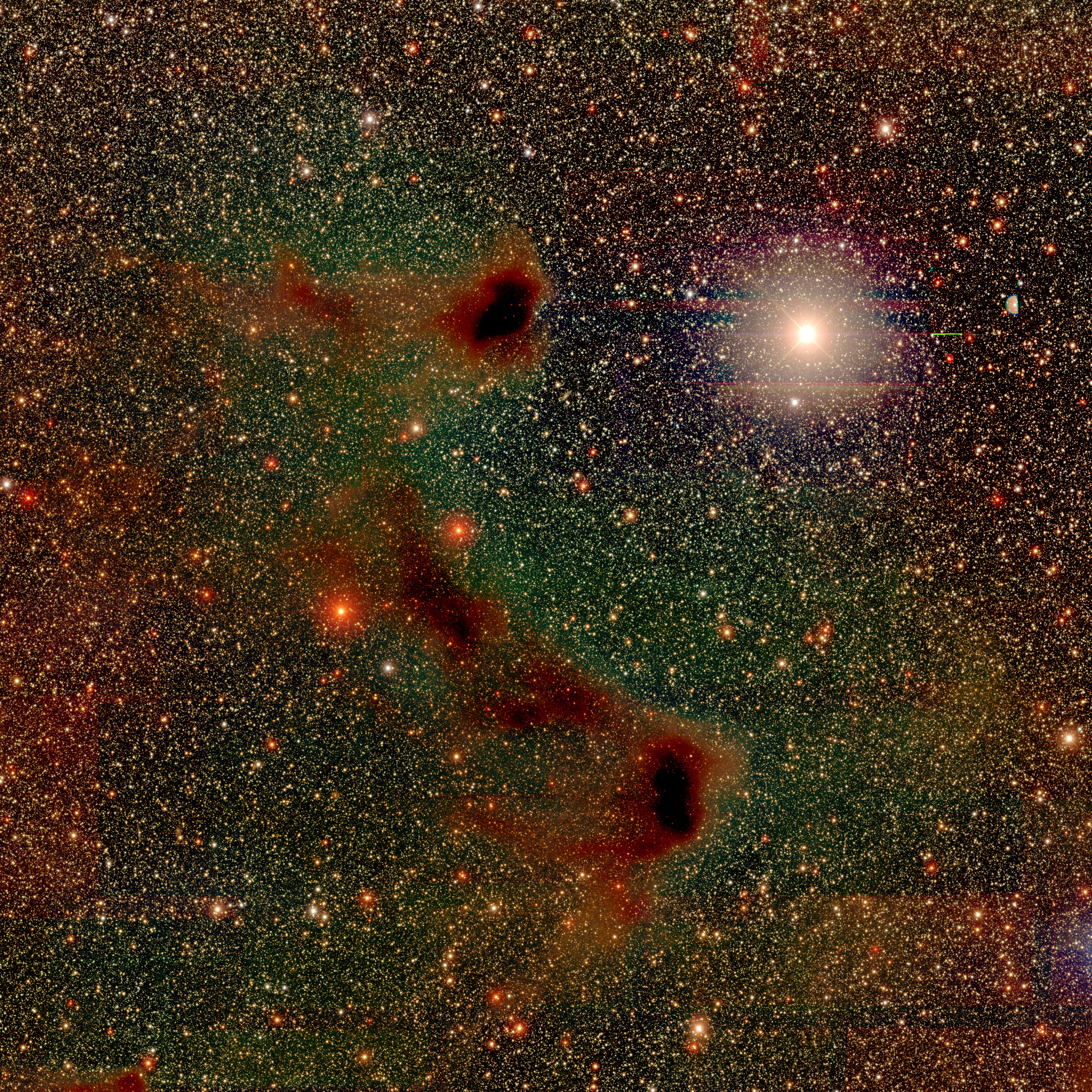
H Scorpii and the dark clouds Barnard 231. Credit: DECaPS DR2

This is an aging giant star with a stellar classification of K6III. After exhausting the supply of hydrogen at its core, this star cooled and expanded off the main sequence. It now has around 53 times the radius of the Sun. The star is about 2.2 billion years old with only a mild level of magnetic activity, and is spinning with a projected rotational velocity of 3.1 km/s. It is radiating 4–600 times the Sun's luminosity from its enlarged photosphere at an effective temperature of 3,875 K.
