= 6 Hydrae =

Star in the constellation Hydra

Observation data Epoch J2000.0 Equinox ICRS
- Constellation: Hydra
- Right ascension: 08^{h} 40^{m} 01.47182^{s}
- Declination: −12° 28′ 31.3433″
- Apparent magnitude (V): 4.98

Characteristics
- Evolutionary stage: red giant branch
- Spectral type: K3 III
- B−V color index: 1.415±0.001

Astrometry
Radial velocity (R_{v})	−7.8±0.6 km/s
Proper motion (μ)	RA: −81.619 mas/yr Dec.: −1.646 mas/yr
Parallax (π)	8.7394±0.1769 mas
Distance	373 ± 8 ly (114 ± 2 pc)
Absolute magnitude (M_{V})	−0.40

Details
Radius	32.7+0.5 −2.6 R_{☉}
Luminosity	267±6 L_{☉}
Surface gravity (log g)	1.91 cgs
Temperature	4,080+173 −30 K
Metallicity [Fe/H]	−0.21 dex

Other designations
- a Hya, 6 Hya, BD−11°2420, HD 73840, HIP 42509, HR 3431, SAO 154515

Database references
SIMBAD	data

6 Hydrae is a single star in the equatorial constellation of Hydra, located 373 light-years away from the Sun. It has the Bayer designation a Hydrae; 6 Hydrae is the Flamsteed designation. This object is visible to the naked eye as a faint, orange-hued star with an apparent visual magnitude of 4.98. It is moving closer to the Earth with a heliocentric radial velocity of −8 km/s. Eggen (1995) listed it as a proper motion candidate for membership in the IC 2391 supercluster.

This is an aging giant star with a stellar classification of K3 III, which indicates it has exhausted the hydrogen at its core and evolved away from the main sequence. As a consequence, it has expanded to 33 times the radius of the Sun. The star is radiating 267 times the luminosity of the Sun from its swollen photosphere at an effective temperature of 4,080 K.
