= B1 Hydrae =

Main-sequence star

b^{1} Hydrae
Observation data Epoch J2000.0 Equinox ICRS
- Constellation: Hydra
- Right ascension: 10^{h} 46^{m} 52.05^{s}
- Declination: −17° 17′ 48.7″
- Apparent magnitude (V): 5.42

Characteristics
- Evolutionary stage: main sequence
- Spectral type: A3V
- U−B color index: +0.14
- B−V color index: +0.11
- R−I color index: +0.04

Astrometry
Radial velocity (R_{v})	+0.23±0.99 km/s
Proper motion (μ)	RA: −15.864 mas/yr Dec.: −18.786 mas/yr
Parallax (π)	17.7995±0.1794 mas
Distance	183 ± 2 ly (56.2 ± 0.6 pc)
Absolute magnitude (M_{V})	+1.45

Details
Mass	2.09 M_{☉}
Radius	1.94 R_{☉}
Luminosity	17.2 L_{☉}
Surface gravity (log g)	4.18 cgs
Temperature	8,433 K
Rotational velocity (v sin i)	96 km/s
Age	652 Myr

Other designations
- 3 Crt, BD−16°3124, HD 93397, HR 4214, SAO 156221

Database references
SIMBAD	data

b^{1} Hydrae is a main-sequence star in the constellation of Hydra with an apparent magnitude of 5.42.
