= HD 83446 =

Star in the constellation Vela

- Location of HD 83446 (circled in red)

Observation data Epoch J2000 Equinox ICRS
- Constellation: Vela
- Right ascension: 09^{h} 36^{m} 49.53851^{s}
- Declination: −49° 21′ 18.0873″
- Apparent magnitude (V): 4.34

Characteristics
- Evolutionary stage: main sequence
- Spectral type: A7 V
- B−V color index: 0.173±0.005
- Variable type: δ Sct

Astrometry
Radial velocity (R_{v})	+17.8±0.5 km/s
Proper motion (μ)	RA: −130.55 mas/yr Dec.: +42.98 mas/yr
Parallax (π)	30.4562±0.1933 mas
Distance	107.1 ± 0.7 ly (32.8 ± 0.2 pc)
Absolute magnitude (M_{V})	1.79

Details
Mass	1.8+0.11 −0.09 M_{☉}
Luminosity	15.99 L_{☉}
Surface gravity (log g)	4.3±0.14 cgs
Temperature	8,331±283 K
Rotational velocity (v sin i)	155 km/s
Age	453+256 −278 Myr

Other designations
- M Vel, CD−48°4836, FK5 2768, HD 83446, HIP 47175, HR 3836, SAO 221344

Database references
SIMBAD	data

HD 83446 is a probable astrometric binary star system in the constellation Vela. It is visible to the naked eye with an apparent visual magnitude of 4.34. Based upon an annual parallax shift of 30.5 mas, it is located 107.1 light years from the Sun. The system is moving further away with a heliocentric radial velocity of +18 km/s.

The visible component is an A-type main-sequence star with a stellar classification of A7 V. Observations with the BRITE constellation led to this star's identification as a Delta Scuti variable with pulsation frequencies of 31.0806 and 34.2098 cycles per day, corresponding to periods of 46.3 and 42.1 minutes, respectively. It has a high rate of spin with a projected rotational velocity of 155 km/s, which is giving the star an oblate shape with an equatorial bulge that is 6% larger than the polar radius. The star is roughly 453 million years old with 1.8 times the mass of the Sun. It is radiating 16 times the Sun's luminosity from its photosphere at an effective temperature of 8,331 K.
