= HD 57197 =

Star in the constellation Puppis

- Location of HD 57197 (circled)

Observation data Epoch J2000 Equinox ICRS
- Constellation: Puppis
- Right ascension: 07^{h} 18^{m} 04.24932^{s}
- Declination: −43° 59′ 12.4288″
- Apparent magnitude (V): 5.84±0.01

Characteristics
- Spectral type: B8 II/III
- U−B color index: −0.47
- B−V color index: −0.14

Astrometry
Radial velocity (R_{v})	13±10 km/s
Proper motion (μ)	RA: −9.483 mas/yr Dec.: −5.396 mas/yr
Parallax (π)	5.1842±0.0442 mas
Distance	629 ± 5 ly (193 ± 2 pc)
Absolute magnitude (M_{V})	−0.43

Details
Mass	3.08 M_{☉}
Radius	3.9±0.2 R_{☉}
Luminosity	234 L_{☉}
Surface gravity (log g)	3.77 cgs
Temperature	12,596 K
Metallicity [Fe/H]	−0.18 dex
Age	220 Myr

Other designations
- M Puppis, 85 G. Puppis, CD−43°3093, CPD−43°1430, GC 9732, HD 57197, HIP 35347, HR 2789, SAO 218618

Database references
SIMBAD	data

HD 57197, also known as M Puppis or HR 2789, is a suspected astrometric binary located in the southern constellation Puppis, the poop deck. It has an apparent magnitude of 5.84, making it faintly visible to the naked eye under ideal conditions. Based on parallax measurements from the Gaia satellite, the system is estimated to be 629 light years away from the Solar System. The value is poorly constrained, but it appears to be receding with a heliocentric radial velocity of 13 km/s. At its current distance, HD 57197's brightness is diminished by 0.3 magnitudes due to interstellar dust. It has an absolute magnitude of -0.43.

The visible component has a stellar classification of B8 II/III, indicating that it is an evolved B-type star with the blended luminosity class of a bright giant and a giant star. HD 57197 is estimated to be 220 million years old, enough time for it to expand to 3.9 times the Sun's radius. It has 3.08 times the mass of the Sun and radiates 234 times the luminosity of the Sun from its photosphere at an effective temperature of 12,596 K, giving it a bluish-white hue. Based on its extinction in the Gaia passband, it has an iron abundance 66% that of the Sun. This makes HD 57197 metal deficient.
