= Zeta2 Librae =

Alpha2 Canum Venaticorum variable in Libra

Zeta^{2} Librae
- Location of ζ^{2} Librae (circled)

Observation data Epoch J2000.0 Equinox ICRS
- Constellation: Libra
- Right ascension: 15^{h} 29^{m} 34.7424^{s}
- Declination: −17° 26′ 27.378″
- Apparent magnitude (V): 6.66 - 6.71

Characteristics
- Evolutionary stage: main sequence
- Spectral type: F0VspEuGdSr
- Variable type: roAp

Astrometry
Proper motion (μ)	RA: −68.387 mas/yr Dec.: +7.364 mas/yr
Parallax (π)	12.6122±0.0334 mas
Distance	258.6 ± 0.7 ly (79.3 ± 0.2 pc)

Details
Mass	1.7 M_{☉}
Radius	1.8 R_{☉}
Luminosity	9.7 L_{☉}
Surface gravity (log g)	4.15 cgs
Temperature	7,543 K
Metallicity [Fe/H]	0.39 dex
Age	977 Myr

Other designations
- 33 Librae, GZ Librae, HD 137949, HIP 75848, 2MASS J15293475-1726274, BD-16 4093, GSC 06188-01530, SAO 159292, TYC 6188-1520-1, WDS J15296-1726A

Database references
SIMBAD	data

ζ^{2} Librae (abbreviated Zeta^{2} Librae, Zeta^{2} Lib, ζ^{2} Lib), also known as 33 Librae, is a variable star in the constellation Libra. It is approximately 260 light-years away from the Sun.

Zeta^{2} Librae does not have an HR number, although it is included in the Bright Star Catalogue Supplement.

== Characteristics ==
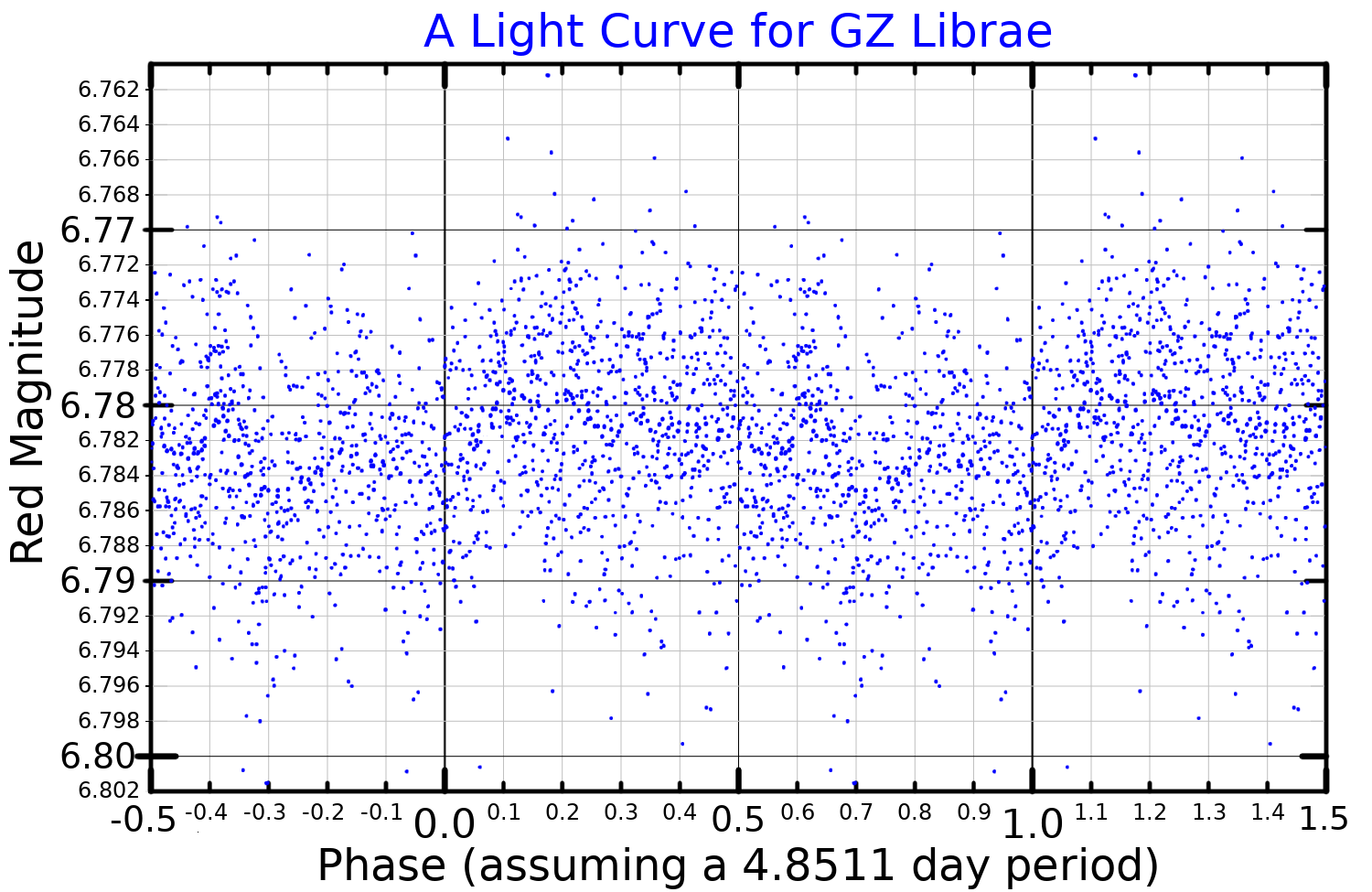
A light curve for Zeta^{2} Librae, adapted from Wraight et al. (2012)

33 Librae is an F-type main sequence star, and show abundance of europium, gadolinium and strontium in the spectrum. It is a rapidly oscillating Ap star. It bears the variable star designation GZ Librae.

== See also ==
- List of stars in Libra
