= B3 Hydrae =

Multiple star system in the constellation Hydra

b^{3} Hydrae
Observation data Epoch J2000.0 Equinox J2000.0
- Constellation: Hydra
- Right ascension: 10^{h} 53^{m} 29.532^{s}
- Declination: −20° 08′ 19.43″
- Apparent magnitude (V): 5.24

Characteristics
- Evolutionary stage: main sequence
- Spectral type: F5V
- U−B color index: +0.06
- B−V color index: +0.47

Astrometry
Radial velocity (R_{v})	−4.08±0.12 km/s
Proper motion (μ)	RA: +80.915 mas/yr Dec.: −238.566 mas/yr
Parallax (π)	33.2327±0.1234 mas
Distance	98.1 ± 0.4 ly (30.1 ± 0.1 pc)
Absolute magnitude (M_{V})	+2.79

Details
Mass	1.48 M_{☉}
Radius	1.93 R_{☉}
Luminosity	6.02 L_{☉}
Surface gravity (log g)	3.99 cgs
Temperature	6,505 K
Metallicity [Fe/H]	+0.09 dex
Rotation	27.1 days
Rotational velocity (v sin i)	6.0 km/s
Age	2.27 Gyr

Other designations
- b^{3} Hya, 6 Crt, HD 94388, HIP 53252, HR 4521, SAO 156301, PPM 258261, CCDM J10534-2009A, WDS J10535-2008A

Database references
SIMBAD	data

b^{3} Hydrae (6 Crateris) is a star in the constellation Hydra at a distance of approximately 98 light-years (about 30 parsecs) from the Sun. It has three optical companions, which are background stars located much farther away.

== Description ==
b^{3} Hydrae (WDS J10535-2008A) is a yellow-white main sequence star with the spectral type of F5V. The apparent magnitude of the star is +5.232. It has about 1.5 M_{☉}, its radius is about 1.9 R_{☉} and the luminosity is about 6.0 L_{☉}. The age of the star is determined to be about 1.647 billion years. The effective temperature is about 6,505 K.

== Optical companions ==
=== BD−19 3124 ===
The secondary (BD−19 3124) is a yellow main sequence star of spectral type G5. The apparent magnitude of the star is +9.6. The mass is about 1.492 ± 0.001 M_{☉}, the radius is about 2.071 ± 0.008 R_{☉}, the luminosity is about 6.946 ± 0.001 L_{☉}. The effective temperature is about 6,566±1 K. It is 119.6 arcseconds away from b^{3} Hydrae and about 774 light-years (237 parsecs) away from the Solar System.

=== UCAC2 23866861 ===
The third component (UCAC2 23866861) is a yellow dwarf of spectral type G. The apparent magnitude of the star is +11.6. The mass is about 0.989 ± 0.001 M_{☉}, the radius is about 1.315 ± 0.002 R_{☉}, the luminosity is about 1.662 ± 0.001 L_{☉}. The effective temperature is about 5,761±4 K. It is separated from BD−19 3124 by 13.7 arc seconds and is about 850 light-years (260 parsecs) away from the Solar System.

=== UCAC2 23866855 ===
The fourth component (UCAC2 23866855) is a yellow-white star of spectral type F. The apparent magnitude of the star is +13.5. The mass is about 1.332 ± 0.001 M_{☉} the radius is about 1.829 ± 0.005 R_{☉} the luminosity is about 4.356 ± 0.001 L_{☉} the effective temperature is about 6,236±1 K. It is located 40.5 arc seconds away from BD−19 3124 and is about 3,820 light-years (1,170 parsecs) away from the Solar System.
