= X2 Centauri =

Star in the constellation Centaurus

x^{2} Centauri
Observation data Epoch J2000 Equinox ICRS
- Constellation: Centaurus
- Right ascension: 12^{h} 25^{m} 21.73454^{s}
- Declination: −35° 11′ 11.0985″
- Apparent magnitude (V): 5.71

Characteristics
- Evolutionary stage: main sequence
- Spectral type: B9 IV/V
- B−V color index: −0.06

Astrometry
| Radial velocity (R_{v}) | −11.3 km/s |
| Proper motion (μ) | RA: −41,277 mas/yr Dec.: −6.379 mas/yr |
| Parallax (π) | 7.1919±0.0668 mas |
| Distance | 454 ± 4 ly (139 ± 1 pc) |
| Absolute magnitude (M_{V}) | 0.07 |

Details
| Mass | 3.1 M_{☉} |
| Radius | 2.8 R_{☉} |
| Luminosity | 141 L_{☉} |
| Surface gravity (log g) | 4.02 cgs |
| Temperature | 11,794 K |
| Rotation | 7.26 days |
| Age | 258 Myr |

Other designations
- x^{2} Cen, CD−34°8146, GC 16938, HD 108114, HIP 60610, HR 4724, SAO 203450

Database references
| SIMBAD | data |

x^{2} Centauri is a blue-white star located in the constellation Centaurus. Its name is a Bayer designation; it is also known by its designations HD 108114 and HR 4724. The apparent magnitude of the star is about 5.7, meaning it is only visible to the naked eye under excellent viewing conditions. Its distance is about 454 light-years (139 pc), based on parallax measurements.

x^{2} Centauri's spectral type is B9IV/V, meaning it displays blended properties of a late B-type main sequence star and a subgiant. It is an estimated 258 million years old, and is spinning with a rotation period of 7.26 days . This star has 3.1 times the mass of the Sun and 2.8 times the Sun's radius. It is radiating 141 times the luminosity of the Sun from its photosphere at an effective temperature of 111,794 K.

The star x^{1} Centauri, which lies at an angular separation of 0.4′ from x^{2} Centauri, may or may not form a physical binary star system with x^{2} Centauri, as the two have similar proper motions and distances.
