= X1 Centauri =

Star in the constellation Centaurus

x^{1} Centauri
Observation data Epoch J2000 Equinox ICRS
- Constellation: Centaurus
- Right ascension: 12^{h} 23^{m} 35.420^{s}
- Declination: −35° 24′ 45.64″
- Apparent magnitude (V): 5.32

Characteristics
- Spectral type: B8/9V
- B−V color index: −0.08

Astrometry
Radial velocity (R_{v})	−10.00 km/s
Proper motion (μ)	RA: −42.132 mas/yr Dec.: −6.896 mas/yr
Parallax (π)	7.3671±0.0953 mas
Distance	443 ± 6 ly (136 ± 2 pc)
Absolute magnitude (M_{V})	−0.2

Details
Mass	3 M_{☉}
Radius	3.6 R_{☉}
Luminosity	265 L_{☉}
Temperature	11,300 K
Age	0.151 Gyr

Other designations
- x^{1} Cen, CD−34°8117, GC 16892, HD 107832, HIP 60449, HR 4712, SAO 203420, G 113 G. Cen

Database references
SIMBAD	data

x^{1} Centauri is a star located in the constellation Centaurus. Its name is a Bayer designation; it is also known by its designations HD 107832 and HR 4712. The apparent magnitude of the star is about 5.32, meaning it is only visible to the naked eye under excellent viewing conditions. Its distance is about 443 light-years (136 pc) from Earth based on parallax measurements.

x^{1} Centauri's spectral type is B8/9V, meaning it is a late B-type main sequence star. These types of stars are a few times more massive than the Sun, and have effective temperatures of about 10,000 to 30,000 K. x^{1} Centauri is just over 3 times more massive than the Sun and has a temperature of about 11,300 K. The star x^{2} Centauri, which lies about 0.4′ away from x^{1} Centauri, may or may not form a physical binary star system with x^{1} Centauri, as the two have similar proper motions and distances.
