= Chi2 Hydrae =

Binary star system in the constellation Hydra

Chi^{2} Hydrae
- Location of χ^{2} Hydrae (circled in red)

Observation data Epoch J2000.0 Equinox J2000.0 (ICRS)
- Constellation: Hydra
- Right ascension: 11^{h} 05^{m} 57.57000^{s}
- Declination: −27° 17′ 16.2727″
- Apparent magnitude (V): 5.65 - 5.94 (5.85 + 7.57)

Characteristics
- Spectral type: B8 III-IVe + B8.5 V
- U−B color index: −0.26
- B−V color index: −0.06
- Variable type: Algol (detached)

Astrometry
Radial velocity (R_{v})	+30.6±0.9 km/s
Proper motion (μ)	RA: +34.417 mas/yr Dec.: −16.477 mas/yr
Parallax (π)	4.7616±0.0652 mas
Distance	685 ± 9 ly (210 ± 3 pc)

Orbit
Period (P)	2.2677 d
Eccentricity (e)	0.00
Periastron epoch (T)	2439925.545 JD
Argument of periastron (ω) (secondary)	0.00°
Semi-amplitude (K_{1}) (primary)	123.3 km/s
Semi-amplitude (K_{2}) (secondary)	168.9 km/s

Details

χ Hya A
Mass	3.605±0.078 M_{☉}
Radius	4.391±0.039 R_{☉}
Luminosity	344 L_{☉}
Surface gravity (log g)	3.65 cgs
Temperature	11,750±190 K
Rotational velocity (v sin i)	112±10 km/s
Age	158 Myr

χ Hya B
Mass	2.632±0.049 M_{☉}
Radius	2.160±0.030 R_{☉}
Luminosity	66 L_{☉}
Surface gravity (log g)	4.23 cgs
Temperature	11,100±230 K
Rotational velocity (v sin i)	60±6 km/s

Other designations
- χ Hya, CD−26°8342, HD 96314, HIP 54255, HR 4317, SAO 179522

Database references
SIMBAD	data

Chi^{2} Hydrae, Latinised from χ^{2} Hydrae, is a binary star system in the equatorial constellation of Hydra. Based upon an annual parallax shift of 4.6 mas as seen from Earth, it is located roughly 685 light years from the Sun. It is visible to the naked eye with a combined apparent visual magnitude of about 5.7.

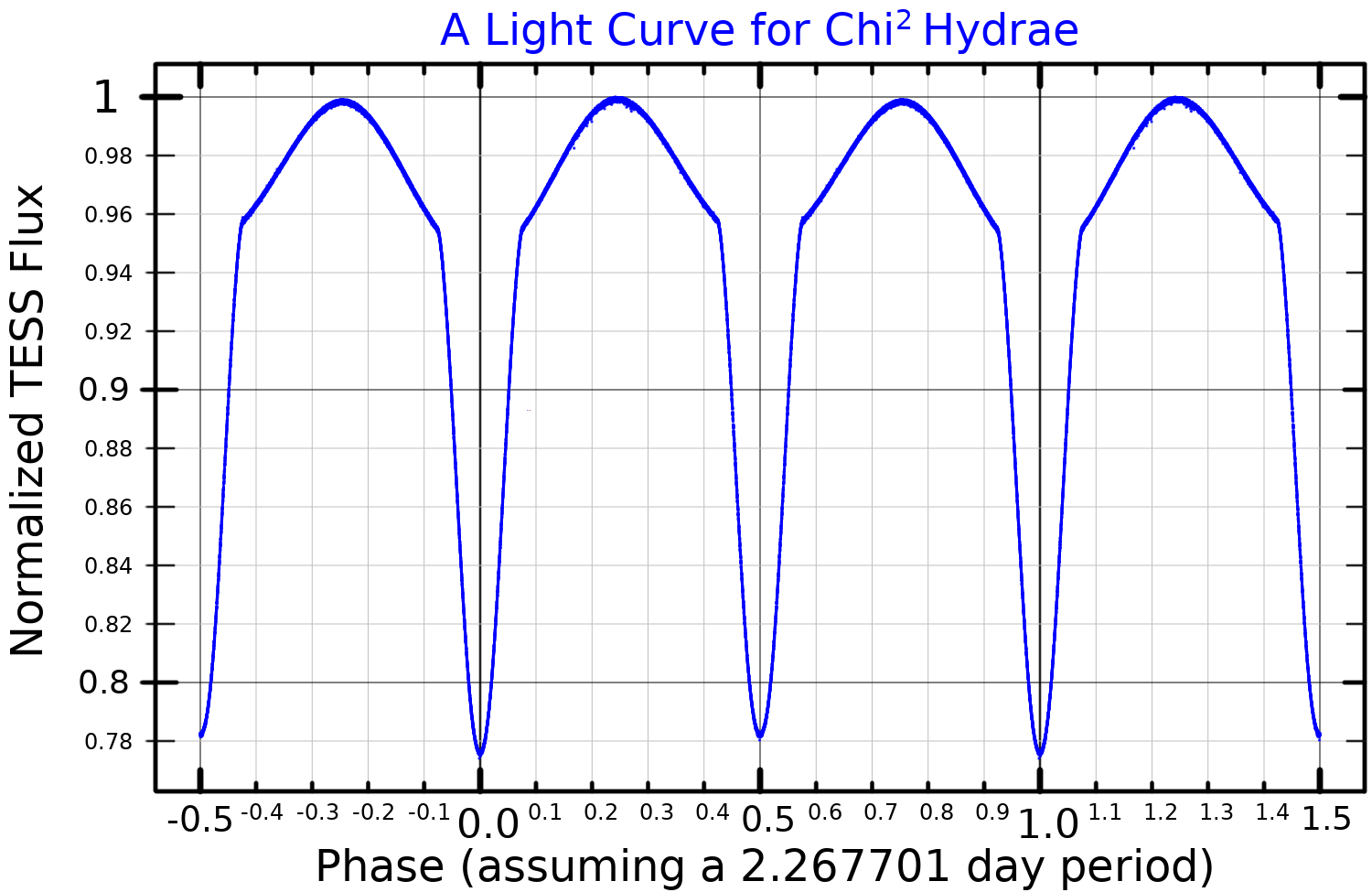
A light curve for Chi^{2} Hydrae, plotted from TESS data

This is a detached eclipsing binary star system with an orbital period of 2.27 days and an essentially circular orbit having a measured eccentricity of 0.00. The eclipse of the primary by the secondary component reduces the visual magnitude of the system by 0.29, while the eclipse of the secondary diminishes the magnitude by 0.27.

The primary, component A, is a magnitude 5.85 B-type star with a stellar classification of B8 III-IVe, suggesting it may be part way along the path of evolving into a giant star from a subgiant. It has about 3.6 times the mass of the Sun and 4.4 times the Sun's radius, although it may be tidally deformed since its radius is 86% of the Roche radius. With an estimated age of 158 million years, it has a projected rotational velocity of 112 km/s.

Component B is a magnitude 7.57 B-type main sequence star with a class of B8.5 V. It has 2.6 times the Sun's mass and 2.16 times the radius of the Sun. The star is filling 60% of its Roche radius.
