= HD 83944 =

Star in the constellation Carina

- Location of HD 83944 (circled in red)

Observation data Epoch J2000.0 Equinox J2000.0
- Constellation: Carina
- Right ascension: 09^{h} 39^{m} 20.99948^{s}
- Declination: −61° 19′ 41.0167″
- Apparent magnitude (V): 4.51

Characteristics
- Evolutionary stage: Main sequence
- Spectral type: B9IV/V
- B−V color index: −0.070±0.340
- Variable type: suspected

Astrometry
Radial velocity (R_{v})	20.0±4.2 km/s
Proper motion (μ)	RA: −34.09 mas/yr Dec.: +18.55 mas/yr
Parallax (π)	14.45±0.15 mas
Distance	226 ± 2 ly (69.2 ± 0.7 pc)
Absolute magnitude (M_{V})	0.31

Details

Aa
Mass	2.75 M_{☉}
Surface gravity (log g)	4.33±0.14 cgs
Temperature	11,561±393 K
Rotational velocity (v sin i)	36 or 51 km/s
Age	15 Myr

Ab
Mass	2.63 M_{☉}

Other designations
- m Car, NSV 4577, CPD−60°1477, GC 13355, HD 83944, HIP 47391, HR 3856, SAO 250653

Database references
SIMBAD	data

HD 83944 is a binary star system in the constellation Carina. This has the Bayer designation m Carinae, while HD 83944 is the identifier from the Henry Draper catalogue. The system is located 226 light years away based on parallax, and it has an absolute magnitude of 0.31. It is the brightest and most massive member of the Carina association of co-moving stars.

This is a double-lined spectroscopic binary. In such systems, the orbital motion causes the lines of the stellar spectrum to shift from redder to bluer over time. Both stars, Aa and Ab, take 30 days to be complete an orbit and an estimated separation of 0.36 astronomical units. The combined stellar classification of B9IV/V matches a star that is entering the subgiant phase, but the stars are actually in the main sequence and are only 15 million years old. Component Aa is 2.75 times more massive than the Sun, while component Ab is 2.63 times more massive.

It is suspected a that there is a far more distant red dwarf orbiting the inner pair. This system display X-ray emission, which is unusual for a star of such spectral type, but is typical of a young, smaller star such as a red dwarf. Furthermore, it was found to have a difference in the proper motion measurements taken by the Hipparcos and Gaia missions. The proper motion discrepancy suggest the separation of the companion is about 20 astronomical units, enough to be detected with adaptive optics or more advanced instruments.

HD 83944 is a suspected variable with an apparent visual magnitude that fluctuates around 4.51 with an amplitude of 0.5. It is not known which component is variable.
