= HD 70555 =

Star in the constellation Puppis

- Location of HD 70555 (circled)

Observation data Epoch J2000 Equinox ICRS
- Constellation: Puppis
- Right ascension: 08^{h} 21^{m} 23.02665^{s}
- Declination: −33° 03′ 15.7147″
- Apparent magnitude (V): 4.83

Characteristics
- Spectral type: K2.5II-III
- U−B color index: +1.60
- B−V color index: +1.45

Astrometry
Radial velocity (R_{v})	+33.20 km/s
Proper motion (μ)	RA: −11.11 mas/yr Dec.: +2.85 mas/yr
Parallax (π)	3.24±0.25 mas
Distance	1,010 ± 80 ly (310 ± 20 pc)
Absolute magnitude (M_{V})	−2.60

Details
Mass	7.9 M_{☉}
Luminosity	2,230 L_{☉}
Surface gravity (log g)	1.67 cgs
Temperature	4,265 K
Metallicity [Fe/H]	−0.12 dex
Rotational velocity (v sin i)	3.8 km/s

Other designations
- w Puppis, CD−32°5185, FK5 1219, GC 11400, GSC 07126-03938, HIP 40945, HR 3282, HD 70555, SAO 199118

Database references
SIMBAD	data

HD 70555 (w Puppis) is a class K2.5II-III (orange giant) star in the constellation Puppis. Its apparent magnitude is 4.83 and it is approximately 1,010 light years away based on parallax.

w Puppis should not be confused with W Puppis (Uppercase, Bayer designation), or W Puppis (Uppercase, Variable star designation).
