= HD 81101 =

Single star in the constellation Carina

- Location of HD 81101 (circled in red)

Observation data Epoch J2000.0 Equinox ICRS
- Constellation: Carina
- Right ascension: 09^{h} 20^{m} 56.81329^{s}
- Declination: −62° 24′ 16.6811″
- Apparent magnitude (V): 4.79

Characteristics
- Spectral type: G6III
- B−V color index: +0.926±0.035

Astrometry
Radial velocity (R_{v})	+51.12±0.15 km/s
Proper motion (μ)	RA: −27.15 mas/yr Dec.: −14.18 mas/yr
Parallax (π)	14.4946±0.1593 mas
Distance	225 ± 2 ly (69.0 ± 0.8 pc)
Absolute magnitude (M_{V})	0.51

Details
Mass	1.95 M_{☉}
Radius	11.19+0.19 −0.15 R_{☉}
Luminosity	65.4±0.9 L_{☉}
Surface gravity (log g)	2.720±0.050 cgs
Temperature	4,908+43 −33 K
Metallicity [Fe/H]	−0.360±0.020 dex
Age	2.04 Gyr

Other designations
- k Car, CPD−61°1242, FK5 2745, GC 12923, HD 81101, HIP 45856, HR 3728, SAO 250544

Database references
SIMBAD	data

HD 81101 is a single star in the southern constellation of Carina. It has the Bayer designation k Carinae, while HD 81101 is the star's designation in the Henry Draper catalogue. The star has a yellow hue and is faintly visible to the naked eye with an apparent visual magnitude of 4.79. It is located at a distance of approximately 225 light years from the Sun based on parallax. This object is drifting further away with a radial velocity of +51 km/s, having come to within 22 light-years of the Sun some 1.4 million years ago.

This is an aging giant star with a stellar classification of G6III, having exhausted the supply of hydrogen at its core then cooled and expanded away from the main sequence. It is two billion years old with 1.95 times the mass of the Sun and has expanded to 11 times the Sun's radius. The star is radiating 65 times the luminosity of the Sun from its swollen photosphere at an effective temperature of 4,908 K. Being a member of the old disk population, the metallicity of the star's stellar atmosphere is much lower than solar.
