= HD 69863 =

Binary star system in the constellation Carina

Observation data Epoch J2000.0 Equinox ICRS
- Constellation: Carina
- A
- Right ascension: 08^{h} 15^{m} 15.92267^{s}
- Declination: −62° 54′ 56.3079″
- Apparent magnitude (V): 5.27
- B
- Right ascension: 08^{h} 15^{m} 16.47634^{s}
- Declination: −62° 54′ 54.8724″
- Apparent magnitude (V): 7.62

Characteristics
- Evolutionary stage: main sequence + main sequence
- Spectral type: A2V + F2V
- B−V color index: 0.086±0.003

Astrometry
Radial velocity (R_{v})	4.0±3.7 km/s
Absolute magnitude (M_{V})	0.71

A
Proper motion (μ)	RA: −23.542 mas/yr Dec.: −12.414 mas/yr
Parallax (π)	12.7170±0.1895 mas
Distance	256 ± 4 ly (79 ± 1 pc)

B
Proper motion (μ)	RA: −20.962 mas/yr Dec.: −14.293 mas/yr
Parallax (π)	12.8292±0.0179 mas
Distance	254.2 ± 0.4 ly (77.9 ± 0.1 pc)

Details

A
Mass	2.10+0.20 −0.17 M_{☉}
Luminosity	42 L_{☉}
Surface gravity (log g)	3.90±0.14 cgs
Temperature	8774+601 −210 K
Rotational velocity (v sin i)	191 km/s

B
Radius	1.43+0.12 −0.08 R_{☉}
Luminosity	3.966±0.016 L_{☉}
Temperature	6806+203 −258 K
Age	635±88 Myr

Other designations
- RMK8, C Carinae, CPD−62°985, HD 69863, HIP 40429, HR 3260, CCDM J08153-6255
- A: GC 11275, SAO 250164
- B: GC 11276, SAO 250165

Database references
SIMBAD	data

HD 69863 is a binary star system in the southern constellation of Carina. It is visible to the naked eye as a dim point of light with a combined apparent visual magnitude of 5.16. The system is located at a distance of about255 light years from the Sun based on parallax. The dual nature of this system was announced in 1832 by German astronomer Carl Rümker. As of 2015, the pair had an angular separation of 4.10″ along a position angle of 70°.

The brighter primary, designated component A, has a visual magnitude of 5.27 and is an A-type main-sequence star with a stellar classification of A2V. It is 635 million years old and is spinning with a projected rotational velocity of 191 km/s. The star has 2.1 times the mass of the Sun.

The magnitude 7.62 companion, component B, is a F-type main-sequence star with a class of F2V. It is radiating four times the luminosity of the Sun from its photosphere at an effective temperature of 6,806 K. The system is a source for X-ray emission, which is most likely coming from the secondary.
