= HD 77370 =

Star in the constellation Carina

Observation data Epoch J2000.0 Equinox ICRS
- Constellation: Carina
- Right ascension: 08^{h} 59^{m} 24.18167^{s}
- Declination: −59° 05′ 01.3624″
- Apparent magnitude (V): 5.17

Characteristics
- Evolutionary stage: main sequence
- Spectral type: F4V
- B−V color index: 0.417±0.005

Astrometry
| Radial velocity (R_{v}) | +13.27±0.63 km/s |
| Proper motion (μ) | RA: −175.405 mas/yr Dec.: +282.080 mas/yr |
| Parallax (π) | 38.0773±0.0883 mas |
| Distance | 85.7 ± 0.2 ly (26.26 ± 0.06 pc) |
| Absolute magnitude (M_{V}) | 3.06 |

Details
| Mass | 1.45 M_{☉} |
| Radius | 1.67+0.05 −0.11 R_{☉} |
| Luminosity | 4.834+0.28 −0.27 L_{☉} |
| Surface gravity (log g) | 4.18 cgs |
| Temperature | 6,699±97 K |
| Metallicity [Fe/H] | 0.93 dex |
| Rotational velocity (v sin i) | 60.4±3.0 km/s |
| Age | 1.3±0.3 Gyr |

Other designations
- b^{2} Car, BD−58°1327, FK5 2570, GC 12449, GJ 333.1, GJ 9283, HD 77370, HIP 44143, HR 3598, SAO 236475, CCDM J08594-5905, WDS J08594-5905A

Database references
| SIMBAD | data |

HD 77370 is a single star in the constellation Carina. It has the Bayer designation b^{2} Carinae; HD 77370 is the identifier from the Henry Draper catalogue. This object has a yellow-white hue and is visible to the naked eye with an apparent visual magnitude of 5.17. It is located at a distance of 86 light years from the Sun based on parallax, and is drifting further away with a radial velocity of +13 km/s.

This is an ordinary F-type main-sequence star with a stellar classification of F4V. It is around 1.3 billion years old and retains a relatively high projected rotational velocity of 60 km/s. The star has 1.45 times the mass of the Sun and 1.67 times the Sun's radius. It is radiating 4.8 times the luminosity of the Sun from its photosphere at an effective temperature of 6,699 K. The star is the most likely source of the X-ray emission detected at these coordinates.
