= HD 83095 =

Star in the constellation Carina

Observation data Epoch J2000 Equinox ICRS
- Constellation: Carina
- Right ascension: 09^{h} 31^{m} 36.27111^{s}
- Declination: −73° 04′ 51.2871″
- Apparent magnitude (V): 5.46

Characteristics
- Evolutionary stage: red giant branch
- Spectral type: K4III
- B−V color index: 1.556±0.005

Astrometry
Radial velocity (R_{v})	+14.2±0.6 km/s
Proper motion (μ)	RA: −24297±0.106 mas/yr Dec.: +1.409±0.098 mas/yr
Parallax (π)	4.4264±0.0866 mas
Distance	740 ± 10 ly (226 ± 4 pc)
Absolute magnitude (M_{V})	−1.45

Details
Mass	1.3 M_{☉}
Radius	59 R_{☉}
Luminosity	826 L_{☉}
Surface gravity (log g)	1.52 cgs
Temperature	4,038 K
Metallicity [Fe/H]	−0.32 dex

Other designations
- H Car, CPD−72°835, FK5 362, GC 13205, HD 83095, HIP 46741, HR 3821, SAO 256634

Database references
SIMBAD	data

HD 83095 is a single star in the southern constellation of Carina. It has the Bayer designation H Carinae; HD 83095 is the identifier from the Henry Draper Catalogue. This object has an orange hue and is dimly visible to the naked eye with an apparent visual magnitude of 5.46. The star is located at a distance of approximately 740 light years from the Sun based on parallax, and is drifting further away with a radial velocity of +14 km/s. It has an absolute magnitude of −1.45.

This is an aging K-type giant star with a stellar classification of K4III, having exhausted the supply of hydrogen at its core then cooled and expanded off the main sequence. At present it has about 60 times the radius of the Sun and is radiating 826 times the Sun's luminosity from its swollen photosphere at an effective temperature of 4,038 K.
