= NW Puppis =

B-type star in the constellation Puppis

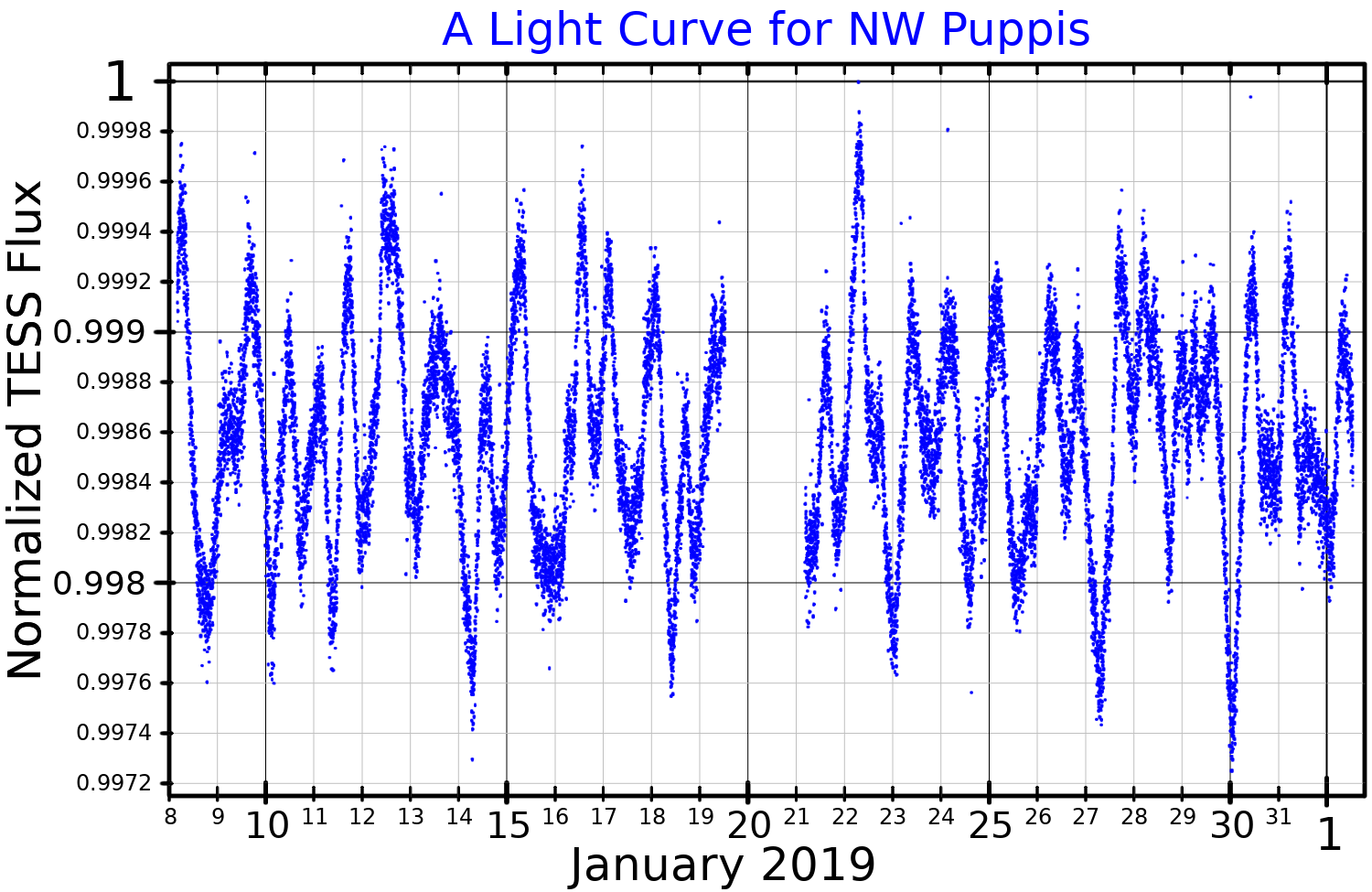
- A light curve for NW Puppis, plotted from TESS data,

Observation data Epoch J2000 Equinox ICRS
- Constellation: Puppis
- Right ascension: 07^{h} 18^{m} 38.18540^{s}
- Declination: −36° 44′ 33.8549″
- Apparent magnitude (V): 5.11

Characteristics
- Evolutionary stage: main sequence
- Spectral type: B3 Vne
- Variable type: β Cep

Astrometry
Radial velocity (R_{v})	+18.00±10 km/s
Proper motion (μ)	RA: −10.172 mas/yr Dec.: +6.621 mas/yr
Parallax (π)	2.9923±0.1210 mas
Distance	1,090 ± 40 ly (330 ± 10 pc)

Details
Mass	6.5 M_{☉}
Radius	5.6 R_{☉}
Luminosity	1,995 L_{☉}
Surface gravity (log g)	4.07±0.57 cgs
Temperature	17,930±540 K
Rotation	1.42 days
Rotational velocity (v sin i)	80±8 km/s
Age	40 Myr

Other designations
- υ^{2} Pup, NW Pup, CD−36°3519, HD 57219, HIP 35406, HR 2790, SAO 197837, NW Puppis, υ^{2} Puppis, Upsilon^{2} Puppis, Upsilon^{2} Pup

Database references
SIMBAD	data

NW Puppis, also known as υ^{2} Puppis, is a star in the constellation Puppis. Located around 1,090 light-years away, it shines with a luminosity approximately 2,000 times that of the Sun and has a surface temperature of 17,930 K.

The star's variability was first detected in 1970 (based on observations made at La Silla Observatory), and announced by Armand van Hoof in 1973. It was given its variable star designation in 1977. Anamarija Stankov ruled this star out as a Beta Cephei variable, but the GCVS and the International Variable Star Index classify it as both a Beta Cephei variable and a rotating ellipsoidal variable. The GCVS lists its period as 0.125 days, but the TESS data shows lower frequency and stochastic brightness variations.

Neither component of this double is given a letter in Lacaille's catalogue or the British Association star catalogue. Gould gave them the designations (Latin letter) v^{1} and v^{2} Puppis, but these are rarely used. Lacaille applied the Greek letter υ to the star now called υ Carinae. The designation υ^{2} first appeared in several catalogues at the end of the 19th century.
