= List of stars in Carina =

This is the list of notable stars in the constellation Carina, sorted by decreasing brightness.

This constellation's Bayer designations (Greek-letter star names) were given while it was still considered part of the constellation of Argo Navis. After Argo Navis was broken up into Carina, Vela, and Puppis, these Greek-letter designations were kept, so that Carina does not have a full complement of Greek-letter designations. For example, since Argo Navis's gamma star went to Vela, there is no Gamma Carinae.

Name	B	Var	HD	HIP	RA	Dec	vis. mag.	abs. mag.	Dist. (ly)	Sp. class	Notes
Canopus	α		45348	30438	06^{h} 23^{m} 57.09^{s}	−52° 41′ 44.6″	−0.72	−5.71	313	A9 II	Suhel; 2nd brightest star
β Car	β		80007	45238	09^{h} 13^{m} 12.24^{s}	−69° 43′ 02.9″	1.67	−0.99	111	A1 III	Miaplacidus
ε Car	ε		71129	41037	08^{h} 22^{m} 30.86^{s}	−59° 30′ 34.3″	1.86	−4.58	632	K3III+B2V	Avior; suspected eclipsing binary, V_{max} = 1.82^{m}, V_{min} = 1.94^{m}
ι Car	ι		80404	45556	09^{h} 17^{m} 05.43^{s}	−59° 16′ 30.9″	2.23	−4.43	692	A8Ib	Aspidiske, Turais, Scutulum; suspected variable, V_{max} = 2.23^{m}, V_{min} = 2.28^{m}
θ Car	θ		93030	52419	10^{h} 42^{m} 57.43^{s}	−64° 23′ 40.1″	2.74	−2.91	439	B0Vp	in IC 2602
υ Car	υ		85123	48002	09^{h} 47^{m} 06.14^{s}	−65° 04′ 19.3″	2.92	−5.56	1622	A9	binary star
ω Car	ω		89080	50099	10^{h} 13^{m} 44.28^{s}	−70° 02′ 16.5″	3.29	−1.99	370	B8III	
p Car	p	PP	91465	51576	10^{h} 32^{m} 01.48^{s}	−61° 41′ 07.3″	3.30	−2.62	497	B4Vne	γ Cas variable, V_{max} = 3.22^{m}, V_{min} = 3.55^{m}
V337 Car	q	V337	89388	50371	10^{h} 17^{m} 05.01^{s}	−61° 19′ 56.4″	3.39	−3.38	736	K3II	irregular variable, V_{max} = 3.36^{m}, V_{min} = 3.44^{m}
a Car	a	V357	79351	45080	09^{h} 10^{m} 58.11^{s}	−58° 58′ 00.9″	3.43	−2.11	418	B2IV	eclipsing binary, V_{max} = 3.41^{m}, V_{min} = 3.44^{m}
χ Car	χ		65575	38827	07^{h} 56^{m} 46.74^{s}	−52° 58′ 56.6″	3.46	−1.91	387	B3IVp	β Cep variable, ΔV = 0.015^{m}, P = 0.10 d
l Car	l		84810	47854	09^{h} 45^{m} 14.83^{s}	−62° 30′ 28.5″	3.69	−4.64	1509	G5Iab/Ib	classical Cepheid, V_{max} = 3.28^{m}, V_{min} = 4.18^{m}, P = 35.54 d
HD 94510	u		94510	53253	10^{h} 53^{m} 29.57^{s}	−58° 51′ 11.8″	3.78	1.42	97	K0III-IV...	suspected variable, V_{max} = 3.75^{m}, V_{min} = 3.80^{m}
HD 90853	s		90853	51232	10^{h} 27^{m} 52.75^{s}	−58° 44′ 21.9″	3.81	−3.71	1042	F2II	suspected variable
HD 76728	c		76728	43783	08^{h} 55^{m} 02.86^{s}	−60° 38′ 41.0″	3.84	−1.06	312	B8III	double star
V382 Car	x	V382	96918	54463	11^{h} 08^{m} 35.40^{s}	−58° 58′ 30.2″	3.93	−7.37	5927	G0Ia0	hypergiant; slow irregular variable, V_{max} = 3.77^{m}, V_{min} = 4.05^{m}
HD 79447	i		79447	45101	09^{h} 11^{m} 16.77^{s}	−62° 19′ 01.3″	3.96	−1.97	499	B3IV	variable star, ΔV = 0.008^{m}, P = 22.26 d
HD 90589	I		90589	50954	10^{h} 24^{m} 23.74^{s}	−74° 01′ 53.6″	3.99	2.94	53	F2IV	suspected variable, V_{max} = 3.96^{m}, V_{min} = 4.00^{m}
HD 83183	h		83183	46974	09^{h} 34^{m} 26.66^{s}	−59° 13′ 47.2″	4.08	−4.83	1976	B5II	
V343 Car	d	V343	74375	42568	08^{h} 40^{m} 37.04^{s}	−59° 45′ 39.7″	4.31	−3.87	1411	B1.5III	β Cep variable
HD 80230	g		80230	45496	09^{h} 16^{m} 12.10^{s}	−57° 32′ 29.2″	4.34	−1.74	536	M1III	suspected variable, V_{max} = 4.31^{m}, V_{min} = 4.35^{m}
HD 47306	N		47306	31407	06^{h} 34^{m} 58.59^{s}	−52° 58′ 32.3″	4.35	−4.31	1762	B9III	
HR 2554	A	V415	50337	32761	06^{h} 49^{m} 51.32^{s}	−53° 37′ 21.0″	4.39	−1.74	553	G6II	Algol variable, ΔV = 0.06^{m}
HD 91942	r		91942	51849	10^{h} 35^{m} 35.31^{s}	−57° 33′ 27.5″	4.45	−3.68	1376	K3/K4II	suspected variable
η Car	η		93308		10^{h} 45^{m} 03.60^{s}	−59° 41′ 03.0″	4.47		7500	LBV+O5.5III-O7I(WR?)	Foramen, Tseen She; in Trumpler 16; binary star; luminous blue variable, V_{max} = −0.8^{m}, V_{min} = 7.9^{m}; surrounded by the Homunculus Nebula; one of the most luminous and most massive stars known.
HR 3643	G		78791	44599	09^{h} 05^{m} 08.83^{s}	−72° 36′ 09.7″	4.47	−1.25	454	F6II-III	
V344 Car	f	V344	75311	43105	08^{h} 46^{m} 42.56^{s}	−56° 46′ 11.3″	4.50	−1.62	546	B3Vne	γ Cas variable, V_{max} = 4.40^{m}, V_{min} = 4.51^{m}
HD 83944	m		83944	47391	09^{h} 39^{m} 21.04^{s}	−61° 19′ 41.2″	4.51	0.33	224	B9V	suspected variable
V520 Car	w	V520	93070	52468	10^{h} 43^{m} 32.31^{s}	−60° 33′ 59.9″	4.58	−2.99	1065	K3Ib	irregular variable, V_{max} = 4.50^{m}, V_{min} = 4.59^{m}
V533 Car	y	V533	97534	54751	11^{h} 12^{m} 36.02^{s}	−60° 19′ 03.5″	4.59	−8.34	12538	A6Ia	α Cyg variable
HD 96566	z^{1}		96566	54301	11^{h} 06^{m} 32.47^{s}	−62° 25′ 26.9″	4.62	−0.65	370	G8III	
V399 Car	P	V399	90772	51192	10^{h} 27^{m} 24.48^{s}	−57° 38′ 19.7″	4.65		7000	A6Ia	semiregular variable, V_{max} = 4.63^{m}, V_{min} = 4.72^{m}, P = 88.3 d
V345 Car	E	V345	78764	44626	09^{h} 05^{m} 38.38^{s}	−70° 32′ 18.7″	4.67	−2.94	1079	B2IVe	γ Cas variable, V_{max} = 4.67^{m}, V_{min} = 4.78^{m}, P = 137.7 d
HD 92397	t^{2}		92397	52102	10^{h} 38^{m} 45.01^{s}	−59° 10′ 58.8″	4.69	−4.08	1852	K4/K5III:	suspected variable
HD 91375	K		91375	51438	10^{h} 30^{m} 20.08^{s}	−71° 59′ 33.8″	4.72	0.22	259	A2III	
HR 3220	B		68456	39903	08^{h} 09^{m} 00.86^{s}	−61° 18′ 06.1″	4.74	3.09	70	F5V	
V518 Car		V518	92938	52370	10^{h} 42^{m} 14.14^{s}	−64° 27′ 59.2″	4.76	−0.97	456	B3V	in IC 2602; γ Cas variable
HD 81101	k		81101	45856	09^{h} 20^{m} 56.83^{s}	−62° 24′ 16.7″	4.79	0.62	223	G6III	
HD 93194			93194	52502	10^{h} 44^{m} 06.94^{s}	−63° 57′ 40.0″	4.80	−1.06	484	B5Vn	in IC 2602; suspected irregular variable, V_{max} = 4.79^{m}, V_{min} = 4.84^{m}
HD 66591	D		66591	39138	08^{h} 00^{m} 19.97^{s}	−63° 34′ 03.0″	4.81	−1.29	542	B3V	suspected variable
HD 73389	e^{2}		73389	42134	08^{h} 35^{m} 19.65^{s}	−58° 00′ 33.5″	4.84	0.60	229	K0III	
HD 93607			93607	52736	10^{h} 46^{m} 51.24^{s}	−64° 23′ 00.6″	4.87	−0.83	449	B3IV	in IC 2602; suspected variable
HD 61248	Q		61248	36942	07^{h} 35^{m} 39.70^{s}	−52° 32′ 01.7″	4.93	−0.48	394	K3III	suspected variable
V376 Car	b^{1}	V376	77002	43937	08^{h} 56^{m} 58.43^{s}	−59° 13′ 45.7″	4.93	−1.47	621	B2IV-V	β Cep variable, V_{max} = 4.91^{m}, V_{min} = 4.96^{m}, P = 0.021 d
HD 91496			91496	51495	10^{h} 31^{m} 02.07^{s}	−73° 13′ 17.4″	4.94	−2.42	964	K4/K5III	suspected variable, V_{max} = 4.87^{m}, V_{min} = 4.97^{m}
HD 90264	L		90264	50847	10^{h} 22^{m} 58.18^{s}	−66° 54′ 05.5″	4.97	−0.63	430	B8V	
HD 92063	t^{1}		92063	51912	10^{h} 36^{m} 20.56^{s}	−59° 33′ 51.5″	5.08	0.50	269	K1III	
HD 59219			59219	36114	07^{h} 26^{m} 21.86^{s}	−51° 01′ 06.6″	5.09	−1.09	562	K0III	
HD 96919	z^{2}	V371	96919	54461	11^{h} 08^{m} 34.01^{s}	−61° 56′ 49.8″	5.12	−6.03	5525	B9Ia	α Cyg variable, V_{max} = 5.12^{m}, V_{min} = 5.19^{m}
HD 53047			53047	33779	07^{h} 00^{m} 51.51^{s}	−51° 24′ 09.5″	5.14	−1.25	617	M1III	semiregular variable
V386 Car		V386	54118	34105	07^{h} 04^{m} 18.32^{s}	−56° 44′ 59.0″	5.14	0.45	282	A0p:	α^{2} CVn variable, ΔV = 0.026^{m}, P = 3.28 d
HD 88981	M		88981	50083	10^{h} 13^{m} 30.68^{s}	−66° 22′ 22.2″	5.15	0.31	304	Am	
HD 69863	C		69863	40429	08^{h} 15^{m} 15.95^{s}	−62° 54′ 56.2″	5.16	0.81	242	A+...	binary star
HD 77370	b^{2}		77370	44143	08^{h} 59^{m} 24.38^{s}	−59° 05′ 03.8″	5.17	3.08	85	F3V	
HR 3153		V460	66342	39070	07^{h} 59^{m} 37.55^{s}	−60° 35′ 13.5″	5.19	−2.34	1045	M0II	in NGC 2516; semiregular variable, V_{max} = 5.15^{m}, V_{min} = 5.3^{m}
HD 97583			97583	54767	11^{h} 12^{m} 45.27^{s}	−64° 10′ 11.2″	5.22	0.30	314	B9V	double star
HD 93549			93549	52701	10^{h} 46^{m} 29.61^{s}	−64° 15′ 47.7″	5.23	−0.37	429	B7IV	in IC 2602
HD 88323			88323	49698	10^{h} 08^{m} 42.84^{s}	−65° 48′ 55.9″	5.26	0.16	341	K0III	optical double
V524 Car		V524	94367	53154	10^{h} 52^{m} 30.85^{s}	−57° 14′ 25.5″	5.26	−6.08	6037	B9Ia	α Cyg variable
HD 73390	e^{1}		73390	42129	08^{h} 35^{m} 15.58^{s}	−58° 13′ 29.1″	5.27	−2.08	962	B3V+...	
HD 91056			91056	51313	10^{h} 28^{m} 52.60^{s}	−64° 10′ 20.2″	5.27	−4.64	3135	K3Ib	slow irregular variable
HD 80951			80951	45581	09^{h} 17^{m} 25.21^{s}	−74° 53′ 39.8″	5.28	−1.44	721	A1V	
HD 84121			84121	47479	09^{h} 40^{m} 42.60^{s}	−57° 59′ 00.9″	5.30	1.16	220	A3IV	
HD 93540			93540	52678	10^{h} 46^{m} 16.58^{s}	−64° 30′ 52.5″	5.33	−0.45	466	B7:V	in IC 2602; suspected variable
HD 92964		V519	92964	52405	10^{h} 42^{m} 40.57^{s}	−59° 12′ 56.8″	5.36	−6.23	6792	B2.5Ia	α Cyg variable, V_{max} = 5.32^{m}, V_{min} = 5.43^{m}, P = 14.68 d
HD 57917			57917	35589	07^{h} 20^{m} 38.81^{s}	−52° 05′ 09.3″	5.38	−0.52	493	B9V	
HD 80671			80671	45571	09^{h} 17^{m} 17.40^{s}	−68° 41′ 22.5″	5.38	2.75	109	F4V	
HD 49689			49689	32494	06^{h} 46^{m} 52.69^{s}	−51° 15′ 55.6″	5.39	−1.83	906	K1II/IIIp+G:	suspected variable
HD 73887			73887	42286	08^{h} 37^{m} 18.85^{s}	−62° 51′ 12.3″	5.45	0.39	335	K0III	
HD 82350			82350	46358	09^{h} 27^{m} 06.50^{s}	−71° 36′ 07.5″	5.46	1.51	201	K2III	
HD 83095	H		83095	46741	09^{h} 31^{m} 36.32^{s}	−73° 04′ 51.3″	5.46	−1.47	791	K4III	
HD 92207		V370	92207	52004	10^{h} 37^{m} 27.08^{s}	−58° 44′ 00.0″	5.47	−6.52	8150	A0Ia	α Cyg variable, V_{max} = 5.45^{m}, V_{min} = 5.52^{m}, P = 1.33 d
V450 Car		V450	53921	34000	07^{h} 03^{m} 15.11^{s}	−59° 10′ 41.3″	5.50	−0.35	482	B9IV	53 Per variable, ΔV = 0.02^{m}
HD 92664		V364	92664	52221	10^{h} 40^{m} 11.46^{s}	−65° 06′ 00.9″	5.51	−0.26	466	B9p Si	α^{2} CVn variable, V_{max} = 5.48^{m}, V_{min} = 5.52^{m}, P = 1.67 d
HD 67364			67364	39566	08^{h} 05^{m} 03.71^{s}	−53° 06′ 28.5″	5.52	0.11	393	K3/K4III	
HD 79698			79698	45219	09^{h} 12^{m} 55.62^{s}	−59° 24′ 50.3″	5.54	−0.28	475	G6II	
HD 85656			85656	48310	09^{h} 50^{m} 55.60^{s}	−62° 44′ 42.5″	5.56	−1.78	959	K1IIICN...	
HD 64067			64067	38152	07^{h} 49^{m} 06.72^{s}	−56° 24′ 37.4″	5.57	−1.72	934	G5II	
HD 46569			46569	31079	06^{h} 31^{m} 18.22^{s}	−51° 49′ 34.3″	5.58	2.73	121	F8V	
HD 96706			96706	54327	11^{h} 06^{m} 49.93^{s}	−70° 52′ 40.6″	5.58	−2.12	1128	B2V	variable star, ΔV = 0.004^{m}, P = 1.74 d
HD 65907			65907	38908	07^{h} 57^{m} 46.30^{s}	−60° 18′ 12.1″	5.59	4.54	53	G2V...	
HD 76113			76113	43499	08^{h} 51^{m} 36.53^{s}	−57° 38′ 01.0″	5.59	−1.12	716	B8III	
V448 Car	O	V448	49877	32531	06^{h} 47^{m} 18.71^{s}	−55° 32′ 24.2″	5.60	−0.72	598	K5III	semiregular variable
HD 65273			65273	38656	07^{h} 54^{m} 53.39^{s}	−57° 18′ 10.4″	5.62	0.51	343	K3/K4III	
HD 68434			68434	39957	08^{h} 09^{m} 33.63^{s}	−56° 05′ 07.7″	5.66	0.33	380	A3m...	
HD 89715			89715	50520	10^{h} 19^{m} 05.12^{s}	−64° 40′ 34.6″	5.66	0.90	292	A1V	
V372 Car		V372	64722	38438	07^{h} 52^{m} 29.75^{s}	−54° 22′ 01.9″	5.69	−2.56	1462	B1.5IV	β Cep variable, ΔV = 0.027^{m}, P = 0.12 d
HD 88661		QY	88661	49934	10^{h} 11^{m} 46.47^{s}	−58° 03′ 38.0″	5.70	−2.29	1294	B2IVnpe	γ Cas variable, V_{max} = 5.63^{m}, V_{min} = 5.83^{m}
S Car		S	88366	49751	10^{h} 09^{m} 22.01^{s}	−61° 32′ 57.1″	5.71		1780	K5-M6e	Mira variable, V_{max} = 4.5^{m}, V_{min} = 9.9^{m}, P = 149.49 d
HD 97670			97670	54829	11^{h} 13^{m} 30.79^{s}	−59° 37′ 09.5″	5.73	−3.00	1821	B1.5V	suspected variable
HD 65662			65662	38783	07^{h} 56^{m} 18.65^{s}	−60° 31′ 35.3″	5.74	−2.17	1244	K4II	in NGC 2516
HD 93163			93163	52487	10^{h} 43^{m} 51.21^{s}	−64° 14′ 56.6″	5.75	−1.71	1009	B3:V	suspected eclipsing binary, ΔV = 0.03^{m}
HD 66194		V374	66194	38994	07^{h} 58^{m} 50.56^{s}	−60° 49′ 28.2″	5.77	−1.72	1028	B2IVnpe	in NGC 2516; γ Cas variable, V_{max} = 5.72^{m}, V_{min} = 5.84^{m}
HD 81830			81830	46225	09^{h} 25^{m} 27.38^{s}	−61° 57′ 02.2″	5.77	1.47	236	A4V+...	
HD 64185			64185	38160	07^{h} 49^{m} 12.95^{s}	−60° 17′ 02.5″	5.78	3.06	114	F1V	spectroscopic binary
HD 76538			76538	43669	08^{h} 53^{m} 48.67^{s}	−60° 21′ 14.2″	5.78	−2.35	1376	B5III	
HD 85655			85655	48339	09^{h} 51^{m} 12.03^{s}	−59° 25′ 32.4″	5.79	−1.01	746	K2IIICNp...	
HD 77615			77615	44256	09^{h} 00^{m} 45.75^{s}	−60° 57′ 49.8″	5.80	−2.13	1259	G8II	
HD 84152			84152	47498	09^{h} 41^{m} 02.10^{s}	−57° 15′ 34.0″	5.80	0.57	362	K0/K1III	
HD 88473			88473	49764	10^{h} 09^{m} 30.20^{s}	−68° 40′ 58.2″	5.80	−0.46	583	A0IV	
HD 49517			49517	32402	06^{h} 45^{m} 53.72^{s}	−52° 24′ 35.0″	5.81	−2.32	1376	K3III	
HD 93943			93943	52922	10^{h} 49^{m} 24.46^{s}	−59° 19′ 25.6″	5.85	−1.24	853	B9.5IV/V	
HD 80950			80950	45585	09^{h} 17^{m} 27.63^{s}	−74° 44′ 04.8″	5.86	1.32	264	A0V	
HD 60060			60060	36444	07^{h} 29^{m} 59.74^{s}	−52° 39′ 04.6″	5.87	0.84	330	K0III	
HD 66441			66441	39184	08^{h} 00^{m} 49.96^{s}	−54° 09′ 04.7″	5.87	−0.79	700	B5Vn	suspected variable
V482 Car		V482	82536	46620	09^{h} 30^{m} 23.45^{s}	−58° 21′ 42.9″	5.88	−1.68	1058	M2III	semiregular variable
V514 Car		V514	92287	52043	10^{h} 38^{m} 02.66^{s}	−57° 15′ 22.7″	5.89	−2.08	1278	B3IV	rotating ellipsoidal variable, V_{max} = 5.88^{m}, V_{min} = 5.92^{m}, P = 2.90 d
HD 82406			82406	46460	09^{h} 28^{m} 30.60^{s}	−66° 42′ 07.2″	5.90	1.33	268	A0V	
HD 82347			82347	46482	09^{h} 28^{m} 47.19^{s}	−62° 16′ 23.5″	5.91	0.06	482	K1III	
HD 87283			87283	49164	10^{h} 02^{m} 00.11^{s}	−60° 25′ 15.2″	5.93	−4.03	3196	A9IV	possibly in NGC 3114
HD 90454			90454	50993	10^{h} 24^{m} 59.50^{s}	−58° 34′ 34.7″	5.93	1.13	297	F2III	
T Car		T	94776	53394	10^{h} 55^{m} 17.26^{s}	−60° 31′ 01.9″	5.93	1.07	306	K0III	not variable
6 G. Car			45291		06^{h} 23^{m} 37.79^{s}	−52° 10′ 51.3″	5.95	0.79	351	G8III	Var? 5.89-98 VTscat 0.041
HD 60228			60228	36496	07^{h} 30^{m} 30.91^{s}	−54° 23′ 58.0″	5.95	0.33	433	M1III	
HD 94683			94683	53334	10^{h} 54^{m} 29.60^{s}	−61° 49′ 35.8″	5.95	−2.59	1663	K4III	suspected variable
HD 54732			54732	34349	07^{h} 07^{m} 13.30^{s}	−51° 58′ 06.2″	5.96	−0.23	564	K0III	
HD 56705			56705	35084	07^{h} 15^{m} 21.27^{s}	−52° 29′ 58.3″	5.96	0.58	389	K0V	
HD 70839			70839	40932	08^{h} 21^{m} 12.10^{s}	−57° 58′ 23.6″	5.96	−3.36	2380	B1.5III	
HD 92436			92436	52127	10^{h} 38^{m} 59.70^{s}	−58° 49′ 00.8″	5.96	−0.53	648	M1III	
HD 91533			91533	51623	10^{h} 32^{m} 47.82^{s}	−58° 40′ 00.3″	5.98	−6.71	11241	A2Iab	suspected variable
V522 Car		V522	93737	52827	10^{h} 48^{m} 05.42^{s}	−59° 55′ 09.0″	5.98			A0Ia	α Cyg variable
HD 81613			81613	46101	09^{h} 24^{m} 05.50^{s}	−61° 38′ 55.6″	5.99	0.92	337	K0III	
HD 94650			94650	53272	10^{h} 53^{m} 42.13^{s}	−70° 43′ 13.2″	5.99	−0.89	776	B6V	
HD 98560			98560	55280	11^{h} 19^{m} 16.84^{s}	−64° 34′ 57.4″	5.99	3.12	122	F6IV	
HD 90874			90874	51194	10^{h} 27^{m} 25.40^{s}	−65° 42′ 17.0″	6.00	1.76	229	A2V	
HD 53349			53349	33800	07^{h} 01^{m} 05.18^{s}	−58° 56′ 25.1″	6.01	2.36	175	F0V	suspected variable
HD 76346			76346	43620	08^{h} 53^{m} 03.80^{s}	−56° 38′ 58.5″	6.02	1.23	296	A0V	has a planet (b)
HD 80094			80094	45418	09^{h} 15^{m} 17.66^{s}	−58° 23′ 18.2″	6.02	0.00	522	B7IV	variable star, ΔV = 0.008^{m}, P = 1.56 d
HD 56239			56239	34780	07^{h} 12^{m} 01.98^{s}	−63° 11′ 24.2″	6.03	−0.29	598	A0IV/V	
HD 57852			57852	35564	07^{h} 20^{m} 21.46^{s}	−52° 18′ 42.8″	6.05		113	F5V	component of the HIP 35564 system; suspected variable
HD 82068			82068	46328	09^{h} 26^{m} 44.18^{s}	−64° 55′ 47.5″	6.05	1.88	223	A3Vn	
V390 Car		V390	61966	37248	07^{h} 39^{m} 00.34^{s}	−53° 16′ 24.2″	6.06	−0.05	544	B9IV-Vp...	α^{2} CVn variable, ΔV = 0.004^{m}
V535 Car		V535	98292	55140	11^{h} 17^{m} 19.02^{s}	−67° 49′ 24.6″	6.06	−2.52	1698	M2III	slow irregular variable
HD 88825			88825	50044	10^{h} 13^{m} 01.16^{s}	−59° 55′ 05.1″	6.07	−2.84	1976	B4Ve	
HD 96544			96544	54294	11^{h} 06^{m} 29.30^{s}	−58° 40′ 30.1″	6.07	−1.81	1226	K2II/III	
HD 92682			92682	52150	10^{h} 39^{m} 15.94^{s}	−74° 29′ 36.2″	6.08	−1.57	1105	K3II	variable star, ΔV = 0.005^{m}, P = 0.084 d
HD 63382			63382	37854	07^{h} 45^{m} 35.52^{s}	−56° 43′ 21.3″	6.10	−1.20	942	F0II	
R Car		R	82901	46806	09^{h} 32^{m} 14.60^{s}	−62° 47′ 20.0″	6.10		416	M6.5 IIIpev	Mira variable, V_{max} = 3.9^{m}, V_{min} = 10.5^{m}, P = 308.71 d
HD 91619		V369	91619	51676	10^{h} 33^{m} 25.40^{s}	−58° 11′ 24.6″	6.11	−6.99	13583	B7Ia	α Cyg variable, ΔV = 0.1^{m}, P = 1.12 d
U Car		U	95109	53589	10^{h} 57^{m} 48.19^{s}	−59° 43′ 55.9″	6.11			G3Ia	classical Cepheid, V_{max} = 5.74^{m}, V_{min} = 6.96^{m}, P = 38.83 d
HD 70982			70982	40926	08^{h} 21^{m} 07.65^{s}	−64° 06′ 21.4″	6.11	0.34	464	G6/G8III	
V461 Car		V461	66546	39225	08^{h} 01^{m} 23.05^{s}	−54° 30′ 56.0″	6.12	−1.92	1320	B2IV-V	Algol variable
HD 65908			65908	38863	07^{h} 57^{m} 12.76^{s}	−63° 17′ 48.8″	6.14	0.37	464	B8V	
V478 Car		V478	80710	45615	09^{h} 17^{m} 51.67^{s}	−67° 03′ 03.2″	6.14	−1.96	1358	K2III	semiregular variable
HD 87543			87543	49281	10^{h} 03^{m} 34.14^{s}	−61° 53′ 02.6″	6.14	−2.49	1734	B4:Vne	
HD 95208			95208	53546	10^{h} 57^{m} 15.81^{s}	−75° 05′ 59.2″	6.16	−3.12	2345	K1II	
HD 95324			95324	53701	10^{h} 59^{m} 14.05^{s}	−61° 19′ 14.7″	6.16	0.93	363	B8IV	
HD 96088			96088	54082	11^{h} 04^{m} 00.25^{s}	−57° 57′ 19.2″	6.16	−3.63	2964	B3III	
HD 47001			47001	31265	06^{h} 33^{m} 26.31^{s}	−52° 19′ 45.5″	6.18	−0.17	607	G8III	
V492 Car		V492	86659	48782	09^{h} 56^{m} 59.84^{s}	−69° 06′ 06.6″	6.18	−1.43	1087	B3V	53 Per variable
HD 87436			87436	49233	10^{h} 02^{m} 59.95^{s}	−60° 10′ 43.3″	6.18	−3.80	3228	A6II/III	suspected variable
HD 90630			90630	50976	10^{h} 24^{m} 44.56^{s}	−73° 58′ 18.3″	6.18	0.53	441	A2/A3V	suspected variable
V655 Car		V655	91272	51425	10^{h} 30^{m} 08.81^{s}	−66° 59′ 04.8″	6.19	−1.70	1235	B4IV	Algol variable, V_{max} = 6.19^{m}, V_{min} = 6.36^{m}, P = 16.93 d
HD 62897			62897	37599	07^{h} 42^{m} 53.36^{s}	−58° 13′ 48.5″	6.20	−0.23	629	K0III	
HD 75086			75086	42936	08^{h} 45^{m} 05.55^{s}	−58° 43′ 27.6″	6.20	−1.23	997	B7III	
HD 87238			87238	49160	10^{h} 01^{m} 58.09^{s}	−57° 20′ 59.4″	6.20	−0.62	753	K1II	
HD 84850			84850	47913	09^{h} 45^{m} 55.82^{s}	−58° 47′ 38.4″	6.22	1.68	264	F5IV	
HD 89263			89263	50287	10^{h} 16^{m} 03.26^{s}	−59° 54′ 12.4″	6.22	1.63	270	A5V	
V532 Car		V532	97451	54708	11^{h} 12^{m} 03.60^{s}	−58° 25′ 24.1″	6.24	−0.53	736	M4III	semiregular variable
HD 91767			91767	51732	10^{h} 34^{m} 12.72^{s}	−60° 59′ 15.5″	6.25	−0.78	830	K2/K3III	suspected variable
HD 65750		V341	65750	38834	07^{h} 56^{m} 50.70^{s}	−59° 07′ 35.0″	6.25		967	M0III	semiregular variable, V_{max} = 6.2^{m}, V_{min} = 7.1^{m}
HD 93344			93344	52520	10^{h} 44^{m} 20.10^{s}	−70° 51′ 35.0″	6.25	1.12	346	A5IV/V	
HD 52603			52603	33588	06^{h} 58^{m} 39.81^{s}	−55° 43′ 44.1″	6.26	1.59	280	K2III	
HD 74622			74622	42717	08^{h} 42^{m} 20.90^{s}	−55° 46′ 28.8″	6.26	1.23	331	K2III	
υ Car B	υ		85124		09^{h} 47^{m} 06.70^{s}	−65° 04′ 21.0″	6.26		1623	A8 Ib	component of the υ Car system
HD 93372			93372	52535	10^{h} 44^{m} 27.25^{s}	−72° 26′ 37.1″	6.26	3.74	104	F6V	
HD 93502			93502	52679	10^{h} 46^{m} 17.12^{s}	−60° 36′ 10.4″	6.26	1.01	365	A0IV	
HD 94491			94491	53231	10^{h} 53^{m} 21.18^{s}	−58° 53′ 36.5″	6.26	−2.16	1575	B5V	
HD 82858			82858	46737	09^{h} 31^{m} 33.05^{s}	−66° 43′ 08.6″	6.27	−0.40	703	K1III	
HD 66607			66607	39238	08^{h} 01^{m} 31.58^{s}	−55° 27′ 16.8″	6.28	−0.28	668	B4V	
V375 Car		V375	67536	39530	08^{h} 04^{m} 42.94^{s}	−62° 50′ 10.9″	6.29		1249	B2.5Vn	β Cep variable, ΔV = 0.04^{m}, P = 1.02 d
HD 61031			61031	36856	07^{h} 34^{m} 39.58^{s}	−51° 28′ 28.3″	6.29	−1.76	1331	A1III/IV	
HD 93662			93662	52797	10^{h} 47^{m} 38.41^{s}	−57° 28′ 02.7″	6.29	−3.35	2763	M1II	suspected variable, V_{max} = 6.28^{m}, V_{min} = 6.41^{m}
HD 94275			94275	53100	10^{h} 51^{m} 46.93^{s}	−57° 16′ 20.3″	6.29	−0.05	604	A6III	
HD 63926			63926	38087	07^{h} 48^{m} 19.51^{s}	−56° 28′ 15.9″	6.30	−2.91	2264	K0III+...	
HD 66341			66341	39073	07^{h} 59^{m} 40.09^{s}	−60° 12′ 26.6″	6.30	−1.81	1364	B8III	in NGC 2516
HD 81502			81502	46049	09^{h} 23^{m} 27.33^{s}	−60° 18′ 08.4″	6.30	−2.91	2264	K1/K2II/III	
HD 86606			86606	48715	09^{h} 56^{m} 09.76^{s}	−71° 23′ 21.5″	6.30	−2.69	2050	B1Ib	
HD 68423			68423	39843	08^{h} 08^{m} 24.65^{s}	−63° 48′ 03.0″	6.32	−0.58	782	B6V	suspected variable
HD 80126			80126	45437	09^{h} 15^{m} 34.73^{s}	−57° 34′ 39.9″	6.32	−1.32	1098	G8II	
QZ Car		QZ	93206	52526	10^{h} 44^{m} 22.92^{s}	−59° 59′ 36.0″	6.32	−3.23	2650	B0Ib:	in Collinder 228; β Lyr variable, V_{max} = 6.16^{m}, V_{min} = 6.49^{m}, P = 6.00 d
HD 82458			82458	46407	09^{h} 27^{m} 49.19^{s}	−71° 46′ 52.3″	6.33	2.57	184	F3/F5V	
V486 Car		V486	84416	47591	09^{h} 42^{m} 12.99^{s}	−66° 54′ 53.4″	6.33	0.04	592	A0V	β Lyr variable
HD 92536			92536	52160	10^{h} 39^{m} 22.85^{s}	−64° 06′ 42.5″	6.33	0.49	479	B8V	in IC 2602
HD 74341			74341	42579	08^{h} 40^{m} 43.55^{s}	−57° 32′ 43.9″	6.34	2.13	227	A3V	
HD 90074			90074	50785	10^{h} 22^{m} 10.48^{s}	−58° 15′ 56.3″	6.34	1.23	343	G6III	
HD 90289			90289	50916	10^{h} 23^{m} 50.66^{s}	−57° 57′ 14.1″	6.34	−0.59	793	K5Ib-II	suspected variable, V_{max} = 6.33^{m}, V_{min} = 6.35^{m}
HD 93649			93649	52730	10^{h} 46^{m} 48.09^{s}	−69° 12′ 35.3″	6.34	−2.04	1545	A2IV	
HD 97472			97472	54673	11^{h} 11^{m} 29.57^{s}	−71° 26′ 10.3″	6.34	0.08	583	K2/K3III	
HD 74148			74148	42440	08^{h} 39^{m} 13.24^{s}	−60° 19′ 02.4″	6.35	0.71	437	A0V	
HD 89805			89805	50562	10^{h} 19^{m} 42.04^{s}	−65° 08′ 14.1″	6.35	−2.59	2000	K2II	
WR 22		V429	92740	52308	10^{h} 41^{m} 17.52^{s}	−59° 40′ 36.9″	6.35	−4.72	5344	WN7 + A(SB1)	Wolf–Rayet star and Algol variable, V_{max} = 6.33^{m}, V_{min} = 6.52^{m}, P = 80.34 d; one of the most luminous stars known
HD 93739			93739	52785	10^{h} 47^{m} 30.62^{s}	−69° 26′ 15.8″	6.35	−1.57	1249	B2IV	
HD 65189			65189	38667	07^{h} 55^{m} 00.44^{s}	−52° 35′ 00.1″	6.36	−1.08	1003	B8III	
HD 72322			72322	41653	08^{h} 29^{m} 36.40^{s}	−55° 11′ 27.3″	6.36	−0.36	721	G0V	
V473 Car		V473	76640	43763	08^{h} 54^{m} 54.05^{s}	−58° 14′ 22.9″	6.36	−0.77	869	B5V	53 Per variable
HD 79699			79699	45214	09^{h} 12^{m} 50.63^{s}	−60° 55′ 00.5″	6.36	0.21	553	B9V	
HD 78632			78632	44665	09^{h} 06^{m} 07.61^{s}	−64° 29′ 59.7″	6.37	0.08	590	K3III	
HD 61394			61394	36977	07^{h} 36^{m} 01.62^{s}	−55° 53′ 15.8″	6.39	0.06	601	K1/K2IIICN.	
HD 96568			96568	54289	11^{h} 06^{m} 24.32^{s}	−64° 50′ 23.8″	6.39	0.58	473	A3V	
HD 44267			44267	29913	06^{h} 17^{m} 51.74^{s}	−52° 43′ 58.9″	6.40	−0.70	858	K2/K3III	variable star, ΔV = 0.008^{m}, P = 1.32 d
HD 62758			62758	37530	07^{h} 42^{m} 10.22^{s}	−58° 37′ 51.4″	6.40	−1.18	1069	B2.5V	
V368 Car		V368	88647	49926	10^{h} 11^{m} 35.49^{s}	−58° 49′ 40.2″	6.40		801	M3III	semiregular variable, V_{max} = 6.1^{m}, V_{min} = 6.4^{m}
HD 51210			51210	33012	06^{h} 52^{m} 45.44^{s}	−59° 20′ 28.6″	6.41	0.62	470	A3m...	
HD 87438			87438	49223	10^{h} 02^{m} 49.42^{s}	−62° 09′ 24.0″	6.41	−3.23	2763	K3Ib	irregular variable, V_{max} = 6.38^{m}, V_{min} = 6.43^{m}
HD 91270			91270	51461	10^{h} 30^{m} 39.24^{s}	−61° 21′ 23.4″	6.41	−0.57	811	M2III	suspected variable
HD 84046			84046	47422	09^{h} 39^{m} 45.15^{s}	−62° 56′ 34.7″	6.42	0.01	623	B8/B9III/IVw...	suspected variable, V_{max} = 6.42^{m}, V_{min} = 6.8^{m}
HD 88907			88907	50067	10^{h} 13^{m} 21.20^{s}	−61° 39′ 31.8″	6.42	−1.06	1022	B2V	
V507 Car		V507	90966	51265	10^{h} 28^{m} 18.28^{s}	−63° 09′ 52.5″	6.42	−2.56	2037	B2/B3III:ne	Be star
HD 91094			91094	51327	10^{h} 29^{m} 03.67^{s}	−65° 10′ 34.8″	6.42	0.00	627	M1III	semiregular variable
HD 98025			98025	55003	11^{h} 15^{m} 42.76^{s}	−57° 21′ 21.1″	6.42	0.16	583	A3V	
HD 78293			78293	44565	09^{h} 04^{m} 48.00^{s}	−57° 51′ 09.5″	6.43	−1.21	1101	A8III	
HD 93359			93359	52537	10^{h} 44^{m} 32.42^{s}	−70° 51′ 18.9″	6.43	1.25	354	A6IV	
HD 65867			65867	38963	07^{h} 58^{m} 21.47^{s}	−51° 26′ 54.9″	6.44	0.43	518	A8/A9IV	suspected eclipsing binary
V469 Car		V469	72303	41644	08^{h} 29^{m} 29.82^{s}	−54° 12′ 42.5″	6.44	−0.28	720	Ap Si	α^{2} CVn variable
HD 49705			49705	32477	06^{h} 46^{m} 41.70^{s}	−54° 41′ 42.2″	6.45	0.93	414	G6III	
HD 81896			81896	46143	09^{h} 24^{m} 37.16^{s}	−70° 04′ 32.8″	6.45	0.06	617	K1III	
V495 Car		V495	88158	49642	10^{h} 07^{m} 56.64^{s}	−62° 13′ 17.2″	6.45	−0.55	817	Ap Si	α^{2} CVn variable
WR 24			93131	52488	10^{h} 43^{m} 52.27^{s}	−60° 07′ 04.0″	6.46	−5.05	6520	WN7 + A	in Collinder 228; Wolf–Rayet star, V_{max} = 6.46^{m}, V_{min} = 6.49^{m}, P = 4.76 d; one of the most luminous stars known
HD 52622			52622	33577	06^{h} 58^{m} 36.39^{s}	−56° 23′ 41.2″	6.46	1.46	326	F2II	suspected variable
HD 54967			54967	34350	07^{h} 07^{m} 16.28^{s}	−59° 42′ 59.2″	6.46	−1.79	1455	B3V	
HD 93738			93738	52815	10^{h} 47^{m} 53.55^{s}	−64° 15′ 46.3″	6.46	0.67	469	B9.5V	in IC 2602
HD 49219			49219	32269	06^{h} 44^{m} 12.81^{s}	−54° 41′ 43.9″	6.47	−0.30	736	B5/B6V	variable star, ΔV = 0.011^{m}, P = 1.60 d
HD 70267			70267	40655	08^{h} 17^{m} 55.79^{s}	−59° 10′ 00.3″	6.47	2.01	254	F5V	
V487 Car		V487	84809	47893	09^{h} 45^{m} 40.64^{s}	−57° 11′ 09.8″	6.47	−0.66	869	B8III/IV	α^{2} CVn variable
HD 93695			93695	52806	10^{h} 47^{m} 44.34^{s}	−59° 52′ 30.9″	6.47	−1.41	1230	B5Vvar	
HD 95122			95122	53556	10^{h} 57^{m} 20.22^{s}	−69° 02′ 17.0″	6.48	−0.55	832	B7V	suspected variable
HD 92399			92399	52103	10^{h} 38^{m} 45.39^{s}	−59° 15′ 44.7″	6.50	−1.82	1502	B4/B5III/IV	
HD 96248		V414	96248	54179	11^{h} 04^{m} 57.57^{s}	−59° 51′ 32.0″	6.58		3700	B1Iab	α Cyg variable, V_{max} = 6.53^{m}, V_{min} = 6.62^{m}, P = 8.52 d
HD 57853			57853	35564	07^{h} 20^{m} 21.43^{s}	−52° 18′ 31.91″	6.63		113	F9V	component of the HIP 35564 system
QX Car		QX	86118	48589	09^{h} 54^{m} 33.88^{s}	−58° 25′ 16.6″	6.64		1610	B2V	Algol variable, V_{max} = 6.6^{m}, V_{min} = 7.21^{m}, P = 4.48 d
HD 96446		V430	96446	54266	11^{h} 06^{m} 05.82^{s}	−59° 56′ 59.6″	6.68		1540	B2k	β Cep variable, ΔV = 0.03^{m}
HD 53143			53143	33690	06^{h} 59^{m} 59.66^{s}	−61° 20′ 10.3″	6.68		59.74	G9V	has a circumstellar disk
VY Car		VY	93203	52538	10^{h} 44^{m} 32.69^{s}	−57° 33′ 55.3″	6.91		9100	F7Iab/Ib	classical Cepheid, V_{max} = 6.91^{m}, V_{min} = 8.00^{m}, P = 18.89 d
AG Car		AG	94910	53461	10^{h} 56^{m} 11.58^{s}	−60° 27′ 12.8″	6.96		17000	B2-3Ib/WN11	luminous blue variable, V_{max} = 5.7^{m}, V_{min} = 8.3^{m}, P = 371.4 d
BO Car		BO	93420		10^{h} 45^{m} 50.63^{s}	−59° 29′ 19.5″	7.18			M4Iab:	semiregular variable, V_{max} = 7.15^{m}, V_{min} = 7.95^{m}, P = 130.7 d
HD 93403			93403	52628	10^{h} 45^{m} 44.12^{s}	−59° 24′ 28.1″	7.30		2670	O5.5I+O7V	binary star
HD 93129A			93129A		10^{h} 43^{m} 57.46^{s}	−59° 32′ 51.2″	7.31		7500	O2If*+O3.5	in Trumpler 14; binary star; primary is one of the most luminous stars known
V Car		V	72275	41588	08^{h} 28^{m} 43.70^{s}	−60° 07′ 21.3″	7.31		5600	G2Iab:	classical Cepheid, V_{max} = 7.08^{m}, V_{min} = 7.82^{m}, P = 6.70 d
HD 93843			93843		10^{h} 48^{m} 37.78^{s}	−60° 13′ 25.5″	7.33			O5III(f)v	irregular variable, V_{max} = 7.31^{m}, V_{min} = 7.35^{m}
HD 95086			95086	53524	10^{h} 57^{m} 03.0^{s}	−68° 40′ 02″	7.36		295	A8III	Aiolos, has a planet (b)
HD 93250			93250	52558	10^{h} 44^{m} 45.03^{s}	−59° 33′ 54.7″	7.50		7500	O4IIIfc	in Trumpler 16; suspected variable
HR Car		HR	90177	50843	10^{h} 22^{m} 53.84^{s}	−59° 37′ 28.4″	7.57		17700	B3Iaep	luminous blue variable, V_{max} = 6.8^{m}, V_{min} = 8.80^{m}
WR 40		V385	96548	54283	11^{h} 06^{m} 17.20^{s}	−65° 30′ 35.2″	7.70		5900	WN8h	Wolf–Rayet star and rotating ellipsoidal variable, ΔV = 0.04^{m}, P = 4.76 d; one of the most luminous stars known
HD 93205		V560	93205		10^{h} 44^{m} 33.74^{s}	−59° 44′ 15.5″	7.75		7500	O3.5V((f+))	in Trumpler 16; rotating ellipsoidal variable, V_{max} = 7.74^{m}, V_{min} = 7.76^{m}, P = 6.08 d
IW Car		IW	82084; 82085		09^{h} 26^{m} 53.30^{s}	−63° 37′ 48.9″	7.90			A4Iab/II:	RV Tau variable, V_{max} = 7.77^{m}, V_{min} = 9.10^{m}, P = 143.6 d
HD 65216			65216	38558	07^{h} 53^{m} 41.3^{s}	−63° 38′ 50.4″	7.98		112	G5V	has two planets (b & c)
HD 97152		V431	97152	54574	11^{h} 10^{m} 04.08^{s}	−60° 58′ 45.0″	8.07		4000	WC7+O7V	Wolf–Rayet star; eclipsing binary, V_{max} = 7.97^{m}, V_{min} = 8.08^{m}, P = 1.62 d
HD 63765			63765	38041	07^{h} 47^{m} 49.72^{s}	−54° 15′ 50.9″	8.10	5.53	106	G9V	Tapecue; has a planet (b)
Y Car		Y	91565	51653	10^{h} 33^{m} 10.85^{s}	−58° 29′ 55.1″	8.16		3050	F2	double-mode Cepheid, V_{max} = 7.53^{m}, V_{min} = 8.48^{m}, P = 3.64 d
HD 51608			51608	33229	06^{h} 54^{m} 51^{s}	−55° 15′ 34″	8.17		114	K0IV	has two planets (b & c)
HD 85628 A			85628		09^{h} 50^{m} 19.2^{s}	−66° 06′ 50″	8.19		559	A3V	has a planet (b)
YZ Car		YZ	90912	51262	10^{h} 28^{m} 16.85^{s}	−59° 21′ 00.7″	8.24		5900	G5	classical Cepheid, V_{max} = 8.24^{m}, V_{min} = 9.08^{m}, P = 18.17 d
WR 16		V396	86161	48617	09^{h} 54^{m} 52.90^{s}	−57° 43′ 38.3″	8.32			WN8h	rotating ellipsoidal variable, ΔV = 0.06^{m}; one of the most luminous stars known
EM Car		EM	97484		11^{h} 12^{m} 04.51^{s}	−61° 05′ 42.9″	8.52			O8V	Algol variable
RT Car		RT	303310	52562	10^{h} 44^{m} 47.15^{s}	−59° 24′ 48.1″	8.55		1430	M2Iab:	possibly in Trumpler 15; irregular variable, V_{max} = 8.2^{m}, V_{min} = 9.9^{m}, one of the largest stars known
HD 85567		V596	85567	48269	09^{h} 50^{m} 28.54^{s}	−60° 58′ 03.0″	8.57		6900	B2	FS CMa variable, V_{max} = 8.44^{m}, V_{min} = 8.75^{m}
UX Car		UX	91039	51338	10^{h} 29^{m} 11.24^{s}	−57° 36′ 48.3″	8.62		2530	F2II	classical Cepheid, V_{max} = 7.81^{m}, V_{min} = 8.67^{m}, P = 3.68 d
XZ Car		XZ	305996	54101	11^{h} 04^{m} 13.47^{s}	−60° 58′ 47.7″	8.67			B2:pe	classical Cepheid, V_{max} = 8.05^{m}, V_{min} = 9.12^{m}, P = 16.65 d
GG Car		GG	94878	53444	10^{h} 55^{m} 58.92^{s}	−60° 23′ 33.4″	8.70			B0/2eq	Be star and re-radiating binary system, V_{max} = 8.44^{m}, V_{min} = 9.08^{m}, P = 31.03 d
V403 Car		V403			10^{h} 35^{m} 40.67^{s}	−58° 12′ 44.6″	8.74		8400	B1III	in NGC 3293; β Cep variable, ΔV = 0.033^{m}, P = 0.25 d
Tr 16-104		V572			10^{h} 44^{m} 47.31^{s}	−59° 43′ 53.2″	8.75		7500	O7V((f))+ O9.5V+ B0.2IV	in Trumpler 16; Algol variable, V_{max} = 8.66^{m}, V_{min} = 9.07^{m}, P = 2.15 d
V348 Car		V348	90707		10^{h} 29^{m} 59.00^{s}	−57° 40′ 32.8″	8.78			B1III	β Lyr variable, V_{max} = 8.55^{m}, V_{min} = 8.93^{m}, P = 5.56 d
WR 25			93162		10^{h} 44^{m} 10.34^{s}	−59° 43′ 11.4″	8.80		7500	O2.5If*/WN6	in Trumpler 16; Wolf–Rayet star; one of the most luminous stars known
HD 60435		V409	60435	36537	07^{h} 30^{m} 56.99^{s}	−57° 59′ 28.2″	8.89		739	Ap...	rapidly oscillating Ap star
WR 23			92809	52331	10^{h} 41^{m} 38.32^{s}	−58° 46′ 18.7″	9.03		3400	WC6	Wolf–Rayet star
HD 92024		V381	92024		10^{h} 36^{m} 08.31^{s}	−58° 13′ 04.77″	9.04		8400	B1III	in NGC 3293; β Cep variable, V_{max} = 9.04^{m}, V_{min} = 9.06^{m}, P = 0.17 d
GH Car		GH	306077	54621	11^{h} 10^{m} 44.59^{s}	−60° 45′ 01.0″	9.20			G0	classical Cepheid, V_{max} = 9^{m}, V_{min} = 9.35^{m}, P = 5.73 d
WZ Car		WZ	94777	53397	10^{h} 55^{m} 18.73^{s}	−60° 56′ 24.0″	9.37		4700	F8	classical Cepheid, V_{max} = 8.63^{m}, V_{min} = 9.88^{m}, P = 23.02 d
CPD -59° 2635		V731			10^{h} 45^{m} 12.72^{s}	−59° 44′ 46.2″	9.43		7500	O8V+O9.5V	in Trumpler 16; Algol variable, V_{max} = 9.27^{m}, V_{min} = 9.78^{m}, P = 2.30 d
Gliese 341			304636	45908	09^{h} 21^{m} 37.602^{s}	−60° 16′ 55.03″	9.465		34	M1V	has a planet (b)
V392 Car		V392			07^{h} 58^{m} 10.47^{s}	−60° 51′ 57.5″	9.49			A2Vp...	in NGC 2516; Algol and α^{2} CVn variable, V_{max} = 9.49^{m}, V_{min} = 9.67^{m}
XY Car		XY	308149	53945	11^{h} 02^{m} 16.07^{s}	−64° 15′ 46.5″	9.49			G5	classical Cepheid, V_{max} = 8.82^{m}, V_{min} = 9.77^{m}, P = 12.43 d
HD 87643		V640	87643		10^{h} 04^{m} 30.29^{s}	−58° 39′ 52.1″	9.50			B2e	Orion variable, V_{max} = 7.4^{m}, V_{min} = 9.8^{m}
CPD -59 2628		V573			10^{h} 45^{m} 08.23^{s}	−59° 40′ 49.5″	9.52		7500	O9.5V+B0.3V	in Trumpler 16; Algol variable
HD 90657		V398	90657	51109	10^{h} 26^{m} 31.41^{s}	−58° 38′ 26.2″	9.69		3500	WN5+O4-6	Wolf–Rayet star; eclipsing binary, ΔV = 0.035^{m}
GL Car		GL	306168		11^{h} 14^{m} 39.84^{s}	−60° 39′ 36.3″	9.70			B3:V	Algol variable
DW Car		DW	305543		10^{h} 43^{m} 10.07^{s}	−60° 02′ 11.7″	9.85			B2:pe	in Collinder 228; Algol variable
SS73 17		V648			10^{h} 11^{m} 02.95^{s}	−57° 48′ 13.9″	9.99			M3pe+OB	Z And variable, V_{max} = 9.6^{m}, V_{min} = 10.0^{m}, P = 520 d
CPD -57 2874					10^{h} 15^{m} 21.97^{s}	−57° 51′ 42.7″	10.16			sgB1[e]	B[e] star
GZ Car		GZ	302719	50615	10^{h} 20^{m} 20.37^{s}	−59° 22′ 35.8″	10.20		2400	G5	double-mode Cepheid, V_{max} = 9.98^{m}, V_{min} = 10.47^{m}, P = 4.16 d
HH Car		HH	303503		10^{h} 53^{m} 36.47^{s}	−59° 27′ 18.2″	10.31			B	Algol variable, V_{max} = 10.3^{m}, V_{min} = 10.82^{m}, P = 3.23 d
EY Car		EY		52380	10^{h} 42^{m} 23.03^{s}	−61° 09′ 57.3″	10.35			B2:pe	double-mode Cepheid, V_{max} = 10.01^{m}, V_{min} = 10.56^{m}, P = 2.88 d
HD 307938		V557	307938		10^{h} 42^{m} 41.52^{s}	−64° 21′ 04.4″	10.57			G2V	BY Dra variable, ΔV = 0.21^{m}
WR 18		V500	89358	50368	10^{h} 17^{m} 02.27^{s}	−57° 54′ 47.9″	10.6		6300	WN4-s	Wolf–Rayet star
HD 94546		V428	94546	53274	10^{h} 53^{m} 44.82^{s}	−59° 30′ 46.7″	10.7			WN4+O8V	Wolf–Rayet star; eclipsing binary, ΔV = 0.05^{m}
He 3-519					10^{h} 53^{m} 59.59^{s}	−60° 26′ 44.3″	10.85			WN11	Wolf–Rayet star, V_{max} = 10.6^{m}, V_{min} = 11.0^{m}
NGC 3603-A1			97950A		11^{h} 15^{m} 07.31^{s}	−61° 15′ 38.4″	11.12		20000	WN6h+WN6h	in NGC 3603; Algol variable, ΔV = 0.45^{m}, P = 3.77 d both components among the most luminous and massive stars known
CR Car		CR			10^{h} 32^{m} 54.07^{s}	−58° 31′ 15.5″	11.30			B2:pe	classical Cepheid, V_{max} = 11.3^{m}, V_{min} = 11.89^{m}, P = 9.76 d
NGC 3603-B			97950B		11^{h} 15^{m} 07.41^{s}	−61° 15′ 38.6″	11.33			WN6h+abs	one of the most luminous and most massive stars known
Innes' star					11^{h} 16^{m} 00.21^{s}	−57° 32′ 51.6″	11.52		41.31	M3.5	has a planet
QU Car		QU	310376	54226	11^{h} 05^{m} 42.49^{s}	−68° 37′ 58.2″	11.54		1290	B+...	V Sge variable, V_{max} = 10.9^{m}, V_{min} = 11.7^{m}, P = 0.45 d
WR 30		V541	94305		10^{h} 51^{m} 06.01^{s}	−62° 17′ 01.7″	11.73			WC6+O7.5V	Algol variable, ΔV = 0.09^{m}
Wray 15-751		V432			11^{h} 08^{m} 40.06^{s}	−60° 42′ 51.7″	11.79			WR:	luminous blue variable, V_{max} = 10.7^{m}, V_{min} = 12.43^{m}
NGC 3603-C			97950C		11^{h} 15^{m} 07.59^{s}	−61° 15′ 18.0″	11.89			WN6h+abs	spectroscopic binary
FO 15		V662			10^{h} 45^{m} 36.32^{s}	−59° 48′ 23.2″	12.09		7500	O5.5V+O9.5V	in Trumpler 16; Algol variable, V_{max} = 12.09^{m}, V_{min} = 12.7^{m}, P = 1.41 d
Sher 25					11^{h} 15^{m} 07.8^{s}	−61° 15′ 17″	12.27			B1.5Iab	in NGC 3603; potential supernova progenitor
WR 30a		V574			10^{h} 51^{m} 38.93^{s}	−60° 56′ 35.2″	12.73			WR+...	Algol variable, ΔV = 0.05^{m}
GJ 1128					09^{h} 42^{m} 46.356^{s}	−68° 53′ 06.04″	12.78			M4.0V	
He 2-38		V366			09^{h} 54^{m} 43.29^{s}	−57° 18′ 52.4″	12.92			M5-7.5	Mira and Z And variable, V_{max} = 12.1^{m}, V_{min} = 14.4^{m}, P = 433 d
BPM 6502		V727			10^{h} 44^{m} 10.23^{s}	−69° 18′ 18.0″	13.09			DA2.2+M	re-radiating binary system
WR 20a		V712			10^{h} 23^{m} 58.00^{s}	−57° 45′ 49.0″	13.5			O3If*/WN6+ O3If*/WN6	in Westerlund 2; Algol variable
LHS 288					10^{h} 44^{m} 21.32^{s}	−61° 12′ 38.4″	13.92		15.602	M4	
OGLE-TR-113		V752			10^{h} 52^{m} 24.4^{s}	−61° 26′ 48.5″	14.42		1800	K	has a transiting planet (b)
MTT 68					11^{h} 14^{m} 59.50^{s}	−61° 14′ 33.89″	14.72	−6.4	25,000	O2If*	rare O2If* type, along with HD 93129A
2S 0921-630		V395			09^{h} 22^{m} 35.20^{s}	−63° 17′ 38.5″	15.3			K0IIIe	low-mass X-ray binary
OGLE-TR-123		V816			11^{h} 06^{m} 51.1^{s}	−61° 11′ 10.5″	15.47			FV+MV	possibly has a transiting planet
OGLE-TR-111		V759			10^{h} 53^{m} 17.9^{s}	−61° 24′ 20.3″	15.55		5000	G	has a transiting planet (b) and a possible second planet
OGLE-TR-132		V742			10^{h} 50^{m} 34.7^{s}	−61° 57′ 25.9″	15.72		7110	F	has a transiting planet (b)
OY Car		OY			10^{h} 06^{m} 22.07^{s}	−70° 14′ 04.6″	16.2		277	M5/M6:...	SU UMa variable and eclipsing binary, V_{max} = 11.2^{m}, V_{min} = 16.2^{m}, P = 0.063 d
OGLE-TR-182					11^{h} 09^{m} 18.73^{s}	−61° 05′ 42.93″	16.84		12700	G	has a transiting planet (b)
OGLE-TR-211					10^{h} 40^{m} 14.39^{s}	−62° 27′ 20.2″			5300	F	has a transiting planet (b)
OGLE-TR-122		V817			11^{h} 06^{m} 52.0^{s}	−60° 51′ 45.7″					has a transiting brown dwarf
OGLE2-TR-L9					11^{h} 07^{m} 55^{s}	−61° 08′ 46″			2935	F3	has a transiting planet (b)
1E 1048.1-5937					10^{h} 50^{m} 08.93^{s}	−59° 53′ 19.9″				Be	anomalous X-ray pulsar
DENIS J081730.0-615520					08^{h} 17^{m} 30.01^{s}	−61° 55′ 15.8″			16.1	T6	brown dwarf
PSR J1048-5832					10^{h} 48^{m} 12.20^{s}	−58° 32′ 05.8″					pulsar
PSR J1119-6127					11^{h} 19^{m} 14.30^{s}	−61° 27′ 49.5″					pulsar
Table legend: Name = Proper name; B = Bayer designation; F or/and G. = Flamsteed designation or Gould designation; Var = Variable-star designation; HD = Henry Draper Catalogue designation number; HIP = Hipparcos Catalogue designation number; RA = Right ascension for the Epoch/Equinox J2000.0; Dec = Declination for the Epoch/Equinox J2000.0; vis. mag. = visual magnitude (m or m_{v}), also known as apparent magnitude; abs. mag. = absolute magnitude (M_{v}); Dist. (ly) = Distance in light-years from Earth; Sp. class = Spectral class of the star in the stellar classification system; Notes = Common name(s) or alternate name(s); comments; notable properties [for example: multiple star status, range of variability if it is a variable star, exoplanets, etc.]

== See also ==
- List of stars by constellation
