= U Carinae =

The Bayer designations U Carinae and u Carinae are distinct. Due to technical limitations, both designations link here. For the star

- U Carinae, HD 95109, a Cepheid variable star
- u Carinae, HD 94510, a K-type giant star

== See also ==
- υ Carinae, Upsilon Carinae
