= T Carinae =

T Carinae and t Carinae are designations referring to stars in the constellation Carina.

The Bayer designation t Carinae (t Car) is shared by two stars in the constellation Carina:

- t^{1} Carinae, a K-type giant star
- t^{2} Carinae, a binary star system with a K-type supergiant star orbited by a B-type giant star

The variable star designation T Carinae is used by the star HD 94476, which has been found to not be variable.
