= Z Carinae =

Z Carinae and z Carinae are designations referring to stars in the constellation Carina.

The Bayer designation z Carinae (z Car) is shared by two stars in the constellation Carina, separated by 0.53° on the sky:

- HD 96566 (z^{1} Carinae), the brighter of the pair, often referred to as simply z Carinae
- V371 Carinae (z^{2} Carinae)

The variable star designation Z Carinae is assigned to the star HD 88946, a Mira variable of 10th-magnitude at its brightest.
