= W Carinae =

The designations W Carinae and w Carinae are distinct and refer to two different stars:

- W Carinae, a classical Cepheid variable in the constellation Vela that is now called V Velorum
- w Carinae (V520 Carinae), a red giant in the constellation of Carina

== See also ==
- ω Carinae, Omega Carinae
