= V344 Carinae =

Star in the constellation Carina

- Location of V344 Carinae (circled in red)

Observation data Epoch J2000 Equinox ICRS
- Constellation: Carina
- Right ascension: 08^{h} 46^{m} 42.54928^{s}
- Declination: −56° 46′ 11.1922″
- Apparent magnitude (V): 4.43–4.52

Characteristics
- Evolutionary stage: main sequence
- Spectral type: B3V(n)
- B−V color index: −0.169±0.008
- Variable type: Be

Astrometry
Radial velocity (R_{v})	+27.0±7.4 km/s
Proper motion (μ)	RA: −9.29 mas/yr Dec.: +8.85 mas/yr
Parallax (π)	5.39±0.14 mas
Distance	610 ± 20 ly (186 ± 5 pc)
Absolute magnitude (M_{V})	−1.84

Details
Mass	7.1±0.1 M_{☉}
Radius	3.00±0.06 R_{☉}
Luminosity	2,328+120 −105 L_{☉}
Surface gravity (log g)	3.79±0.18 cgs
Temperature	17,660±560 K
Rotational velocity (v sin i)	268±18 km/s
Age	31.6±3.9 Myr

Other designations
- f Car, V344 Car, CPD−56°1865, FK5 2695, GC 12138, HD 75311, HIP 43105, HR 3498, SAO 236268

Database references
SIMBAD	data

V344 Carinae is a single star in the southern constellation of Carina. It has the Bayer designation f Carinae, while V344 Carinae is its variable star designation. This star has a blue-white hue and is visible to the naked eye with an apparent visual magnitude that fluctuates around 4.50. Historically, it was mentioned in the Almagest, suggesting that some time around 130 BCE it was brighter than its current magnitude. This object is located at a distance of approximately 610 light-years from the Sun based on parallax. The star is drifting further away with a radial velocity of around +27 km/s.

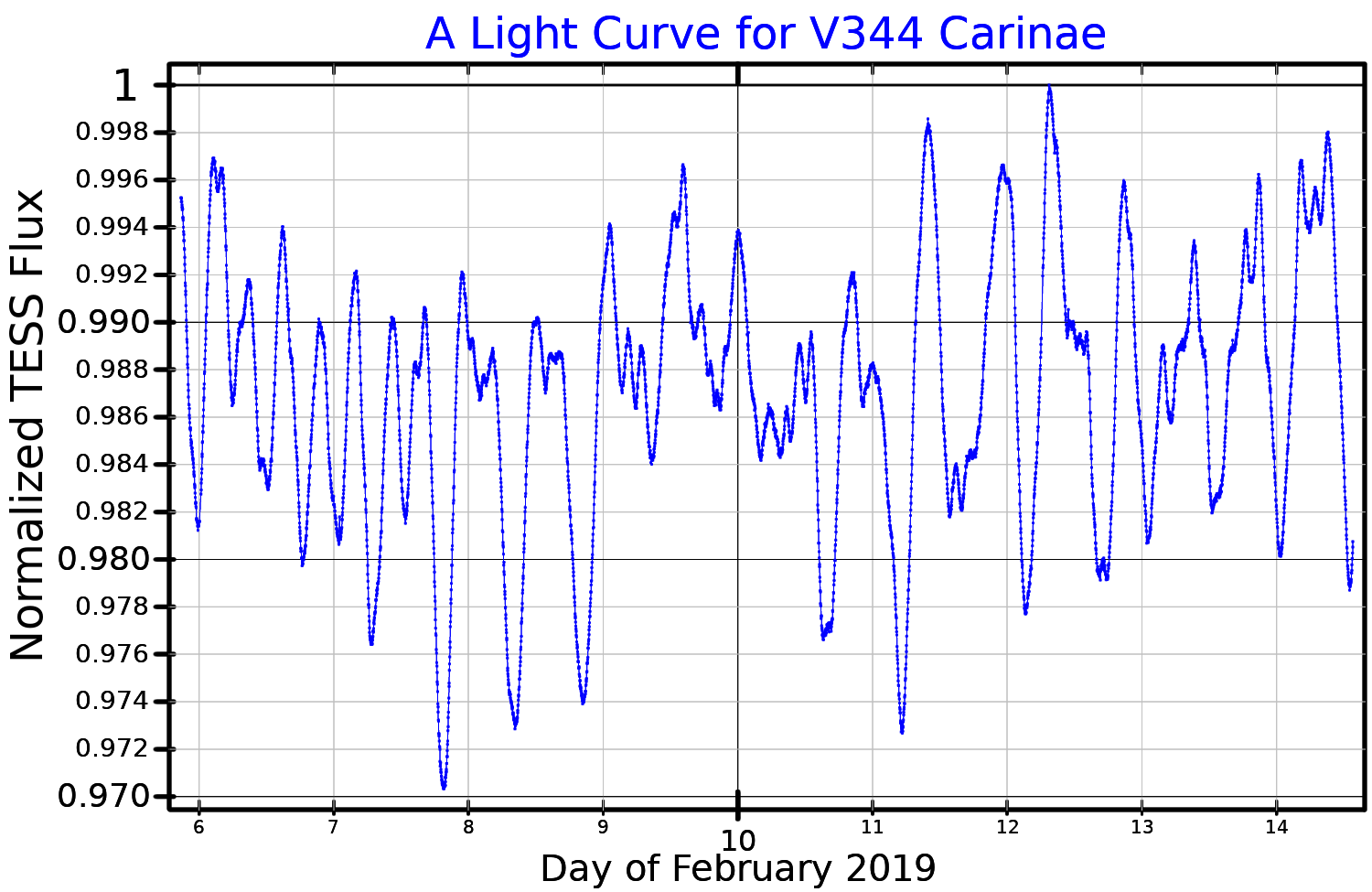
A light curve for V344 Carinae, plotted from TESS data

This is a B-type main-sequence star with a stellar classification of B3V(n). It is a Be star; a rapidly rotating star that is hosting a circumstellar disk of hot, decreted gas. In 1951, Alan William James Cousins announced his discovery that the star, then known as f Carinae, is a photometrically variable star. It was given its variable star designation in 1975. Its brightness ranges from 4.43 down to 4.52 in visual magnitude, and it has been classified as a Gamma Cassiopeiae variable. The star is 32 million years old and is spinning with a projected rotational velocity of 268 km/s. It has seven times the mass of the Sun and around 3.0 times the Sun's radius. The star is radiating 2,328 times the luminosity of the Sun from its photosphere at an effective temperature of 17,660 K.
