= V533 Carinae =

Star in the constellation Carina

- Location of V533 Carinae (circled)

Observation data Epoch J2000 Equinox ICRS
- Constellation: Carina
- Right ascension: 11^{h} 12^{m} 36.01323^{s}
- Declination: −60° 19′ 03.4547″
- Apparent magnitude (V): 4.56 to 4.67

Characteristics
- Evolutionary stage: Blue supergiant
- Spectral type: A5Iae:
- U−B color index: +0.08
- B−V color index: +0.52
- Variable type: α Cyg

Astrometry
Radial velocity (R_{v})	−8.40 km/s
Proper motion (μ)	RA: −6.302 mas/yr Dec.: +2.021 mas/yr
Parallax (π)	0.3932±0.0883 mas
Distance	9,200+3,100 −1,700 ly (2,820+960 −530 pc)
Absolute magnitude (M_{V})	−7.9

Details
Mass	17 M_{☉}
Radius	245 R_{☉}
Luminosity	96,000 L_{☉}
Temperature	8,330 K
Rotational velocity (v sin i)	34 km/s

Other designations
- V533 Carinae, y Carinae, HR 4352, HD 97534, CD−59°3611, HIP 54751, SAO 251316, GC 15415, CCDM J11126-6019

Database references
SIMBAD	data

V533 Carinae (V533 Car, y Car, y Carinae) is a A-type supergiant and a Alpha Cygni variable star with a mean apparent magnitude of about +4.6 in the constellation Carina. It is located at a distance of about 9,000 light years. It is visible to the naked eye outside of brightly-lit urban areas.

== Location ==
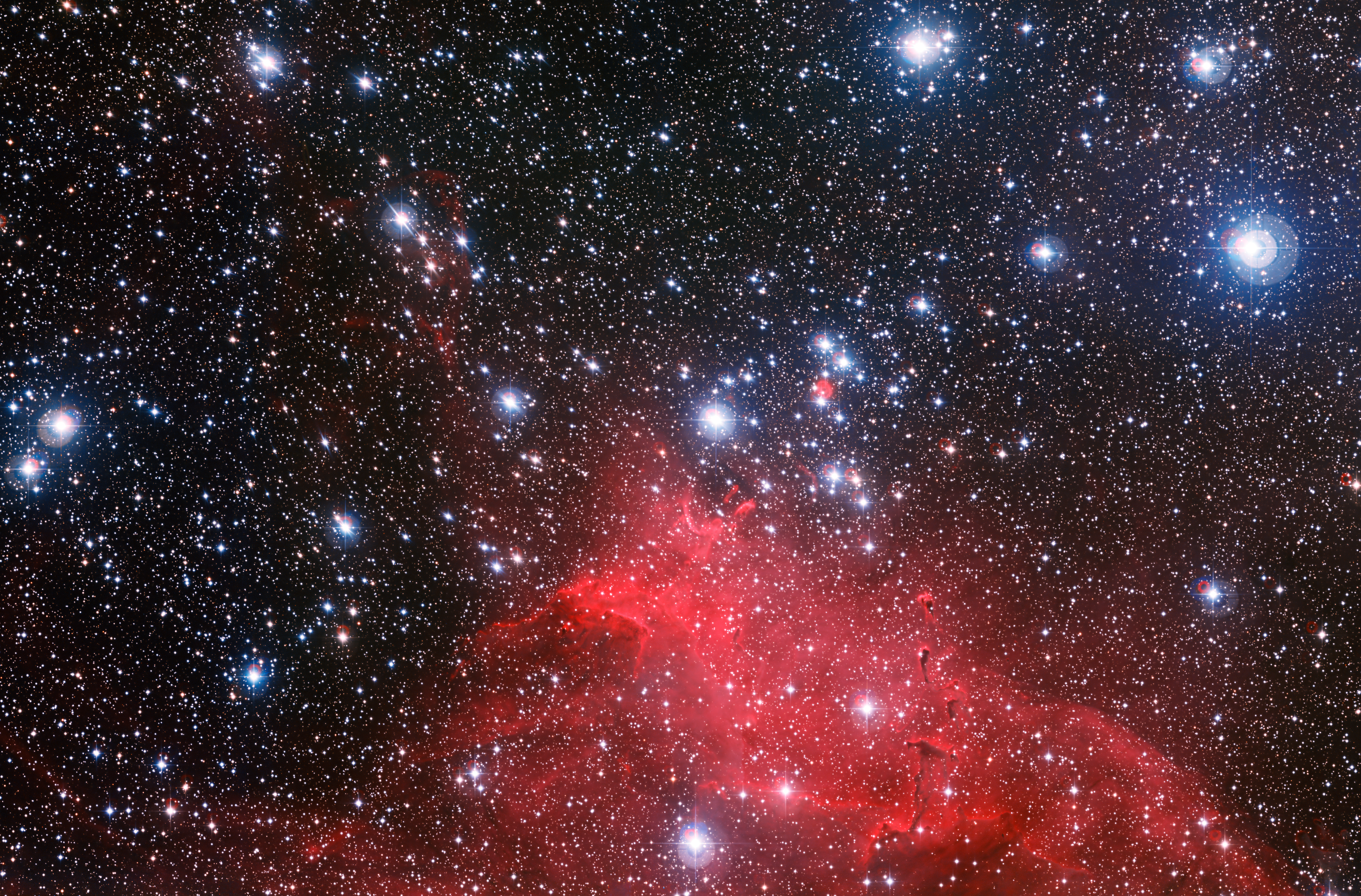
NGC 3572 plus nebulosity. V533 Car is the brightest star in the frame, on the right (south is up).

V533 Carinae is found near the Carina Nebula on the edge of the constellation Carina towards Crux. It is a member of Collinder 240, a sparse open cluster sometimes considered to be a portion of the richer nearby cluster NGC 3572. Together with the small clusters Hogg 10 and 11, they are all part of the Carina OB2 stellar association.

V533 Carinae is the brightest star in the region. The other bright stars in NGC 3572 are hot young stars such as HD 97166 and all the clusters in the region are only a few million years old.

V533 Carinae is classified as a double star with the companion being a magnitude 11.5 star 21.7 arc-seconds away.

== Variability ==
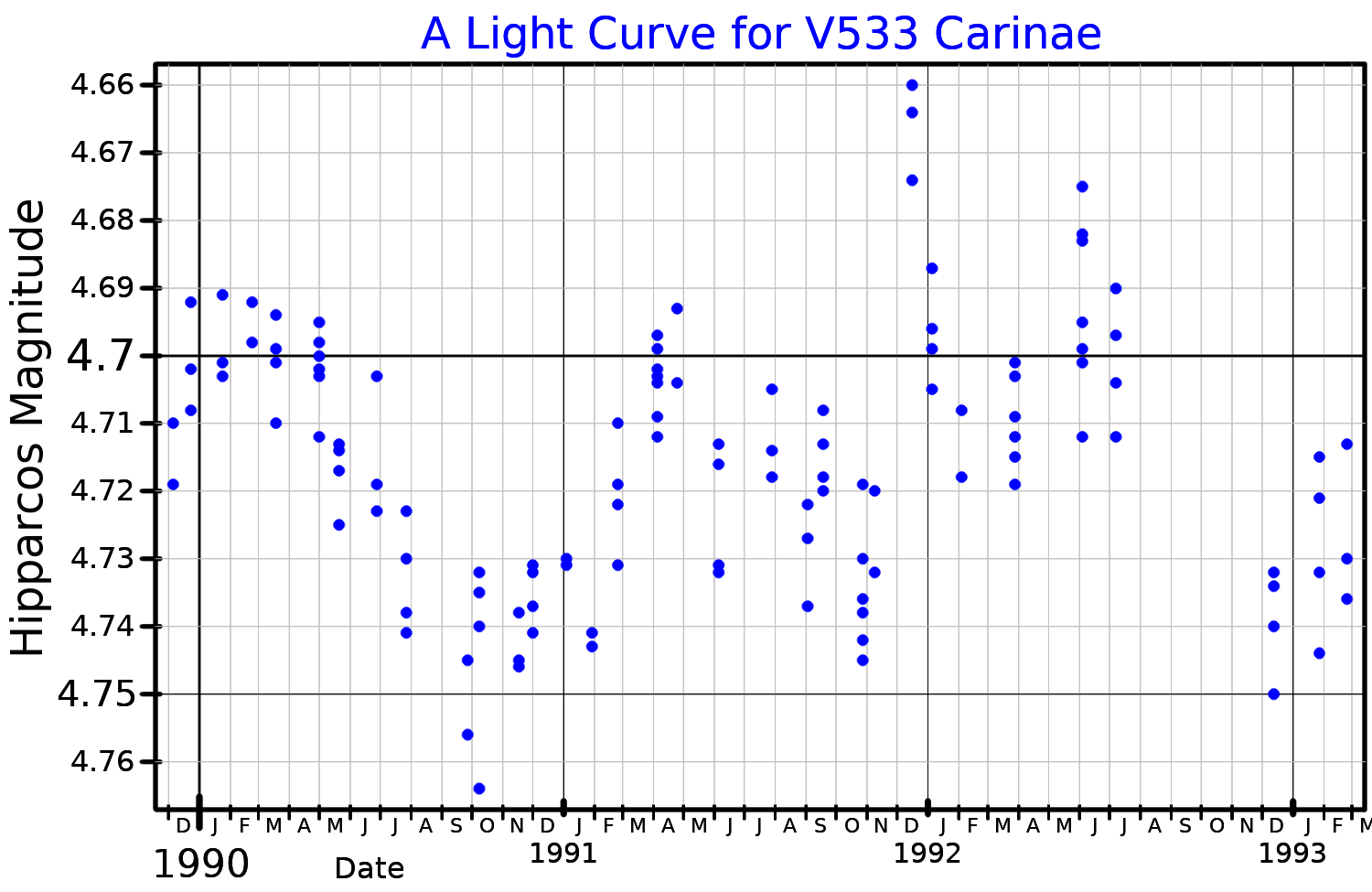
A light curve for V533 Carinae, plotted from Hipparcos data

V533 Carinae was one of many small amplitude variable stars detected from an analysis of Hipparcos photometry. It was granted its variable star designation in 1999 as a batch of 2,675 new variables. It is classified as an Alpha Cygni type variable and its brightness varies from magnitude +4.69 to +4.75 as measured on the Hipparcos photometric scale. A period of 1.58499 days and an average visual amplitude of 0.0146 magnitudes are quoted although the variations are not strictly regular.

== Properties ==
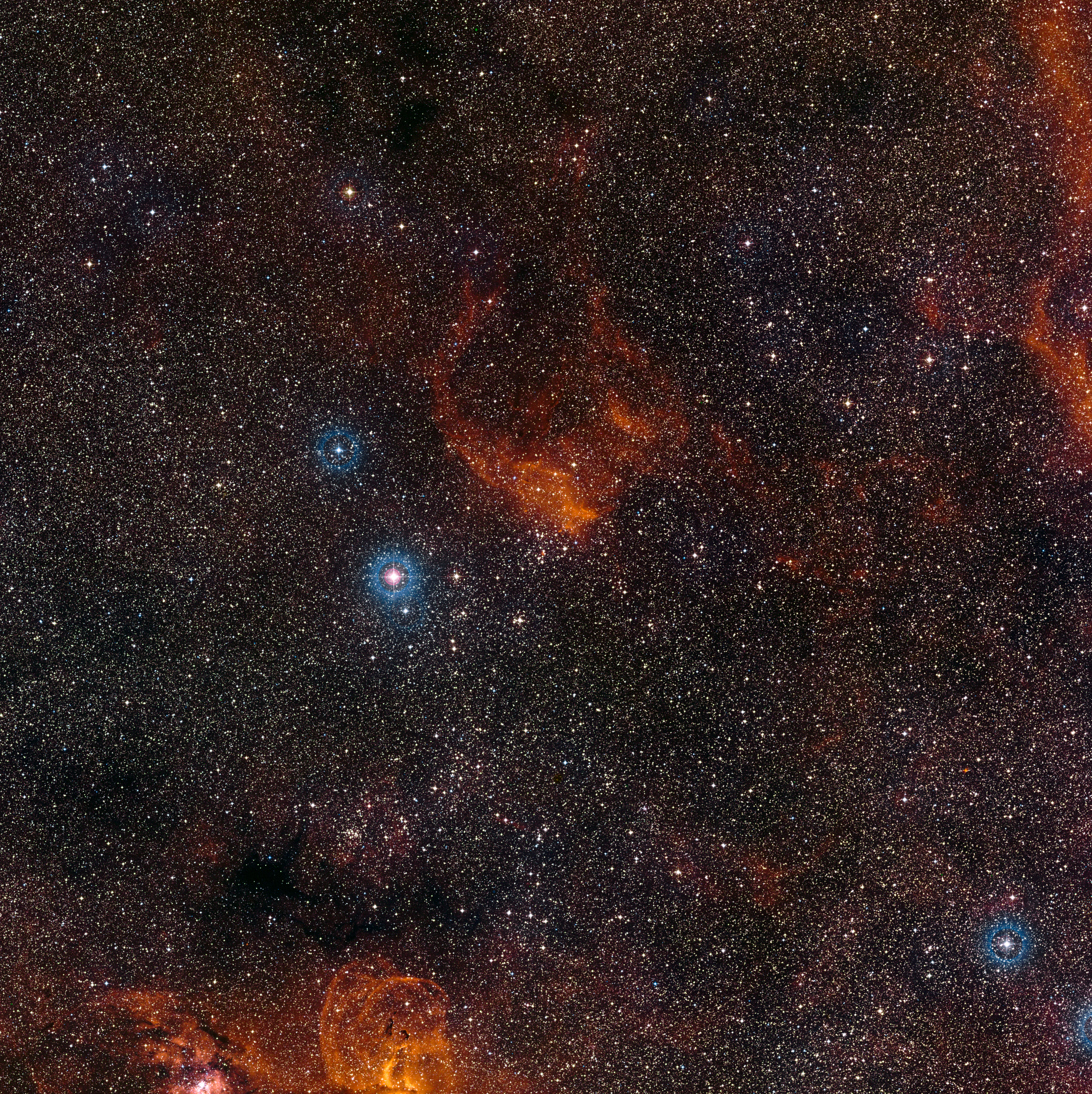
The Carina Nebula is at the very right edge of the frame (north is up) and V533 Car is the brightest star shown, near the open cluster NGC 3572.

V533 Carinae is a bright supergiant with a luminosity around 100,000 times that of the sun. The temperature is over 8,000 K and the radius around 140 R_{☉}. Its equatorial rotation is more than 15 times faster than the sun's.

Prior to 1971, it was always classified with an early or mid F-type spectral type, but since then has always been given a mid or late A class.
