= HD 88981 =

Star in the constellation Carina

- Location of M Carinae (circled)

Observation data Epoch J2000 Equinox J2000
- Constellation: Carina
- Right ascension: 10^{h} 13^{m} 30.6318^{s}
- Declination: −66° 22′ 22.1166″
- Apparent magnitude (V): 5.154±0.009

Characteristics
- Evolutionary stage: main sequence
- Spectral type: kA8 mF4 III
- U−B color index: +0.18
- B−V color index: +0.22

Astrometry
Radial velocity (R_{v})	−15.2 ± 2 km/s
Proper motion (μ)	RA: −34.330 mas/yr Dec.: +11.333 mas/yr
Parallax (π)	10.5045±0.1031 mas
Distance	310 ± 3 ly (95.2 ± 0.9 pc)
Absolute magnitude (M_{V})	+0.28

Details
Mass	2.14±0.40 M_{☉}
Radius	4.45+0.35 −0.16 R_{☉}
Luminosity	62.9±0.7 L_{☉}
Surface gravity (log g)	3.52±0.39 cgs
Temperature	7,706+142 −289 K
Rotational velocity (v sin i)	60 km/s

Other designations
- M Carinae, CPD−65°1273, GC 14066, HD 88981, HIP 50083, HR 4025, SAO 250880, GSC 08955-01326

Database references
SIMBAD	data

M Carinae (HD 88981) is a solitary star in the constellation Carina. It has an apparent magnitude of +5.154, making it faintly visible to the naked eye under ideal and is located approximately 310 light-years from Earth. With a heliocentric radial velocity of −15.2 km/s M Carinae is drifting closer to the Solar System.

M Car has a stellar classification of kA8 mF4 III which indicates that it has the calcium K-line and surface temperature of an A8 star and the metallic lines of an evolved F-type giant that has just exhausted hydrogen fusion at its core. At present M Car has 2.14 times the mass of the Sun but has mildly expanded to 4.45 times its girth. It shines at a luminosity almost 63 times greater than the Sun from its bloated photosphere at an effective temperature of 7,706 K, which gives it the white glow of an A-type star. M Car spins moderately at a projected rotational velocity of 60 km/s, slightly faster than most Am stars.
