= HD 91942 =

Star in the constellation Carina

- Location of HD 91942 (circled in red)

Observation data Epoch J2000.0 Equinox ICRS
- Constellation: Carina
- Right ascension: 10^{h} 35^{m} 35.29721^{s}
- Declination: −57° 33′ 27.4835″
- Apparent magnitude (V): 4.45

Characteristics
- Spectral type: K3II-IIb
- B−V color index: 1.604±0.004
- Variable type: Suspected

Astrometry
Radial velocity (R_{v})	+9.9±0.7 km/s
Proper motion (μ)	RA: −15.93 mas/yr Dec.: +0.49 mas/yr
Parallax (π)	2.77±0.17 mas
Distance	1,180 ± 70 ly (360 ± 20 pc)
Absolute magnitude (M_{V})	−3.77

Details
Mass	8.1±0.7 M_{☉}
Radius	155.5+5.6 −11.3 R_{☉}
Luminosity	5,485±693 L_{☉}
Surface gravity (log g)	2.0 cgs
Temperature	3,983+152 −69 K
Metallicity [Fe/H]	0.0 dex
Rotational velocity (v sin i)	5.8 km/s
Age	35.7±8.3 Myr

Other designations
- r Car, NSV 4904, CPD−56°3544, FK5 393, GC 14570, HD 91942, HIP 51849, HR 4159, SAO 238222

Database references
SIMBAD	data

HD 91942 is a single variable star in the constellation Carina. It has the Bayer designation r Carinae, while HD 91942 is the identifier from the Henry Draper catalogue. This orange-hued object is visible to the naked eye with an apparent visual magnitude of 4.45. Based on parallax measurements, it is located at a distance of approximately 1,180 light years from the Sun. The star has an absolute magnitude of −3.77, and is drifting further away with a radial velocity of +9.9 km/s.

This object is a massive, aging bright giant with a stellar classification of K3II-IIb. It is a suspected variable star that fluctuates in magnitude by an amplitude of 0.05 in the B-band of the UBV photometric system. With the supply of hydrogen exhausted at its core, it has evolved of the main sequence and cooled and expanded to 156 times the Sun's radius. It is an estimated 36 million years old with eight times the mass of the Sun. It is radiating around 5,500 times the luminosity of the Sun from its swollen photosphere at an effective temperature of 3,983 K.
