= V395 Carinae =

Low-mass X-ray binary in Carina

Observation data Epoch J2000 Equinox ICRS
- Constellation: Carina
- Right ascension: 09^{h} 22^{m} 34.67620^{s}
- Declination: −63° 17′ 41.3558″
- Apparent magnitude (V): 15.3

Characteristics
- Spectral type: K0III
- U−B color index: −0.5
- B−V color index: +0.6
- Variable type: X-ray binary

Astrometry
Radial velocity (R_{v})	+51.6 km/s
Proper motion (μ)	RA: −3.163 mas/yr Dec.: +4.247 mas/yr
Parallax (π)	0.0607±0.0231 mas
Distance	approx. 50,000 ly (approx. 16,000 pc)

Orbit
Period (P)	9.0026 ± 0.0001 d
Inclination (i)	82.2 ± 1.0°
Semi-amplitude (K_{2}) (secondary)	99.1 ± 3.1 km/s

Details

Donor Star
Mass	0.35 ± 0.03 M_{☉}
Rotational velocity (v sin i)	32.9 ± 0.8 km/s

Neutron star
Mass	1.44 ± 0.10 M_{☉}

Other designations
- V395 Car, 2S 0921-630

Database references
SIMBAD	data

V395 Carinae, also known as 2S 0921-630, is a low-mass X-ray binary in the constellation Carina. X-ray observations have revealed that it has an extended accretion disk corona.
