= V448 Carinae =

Star in the constellation Carina

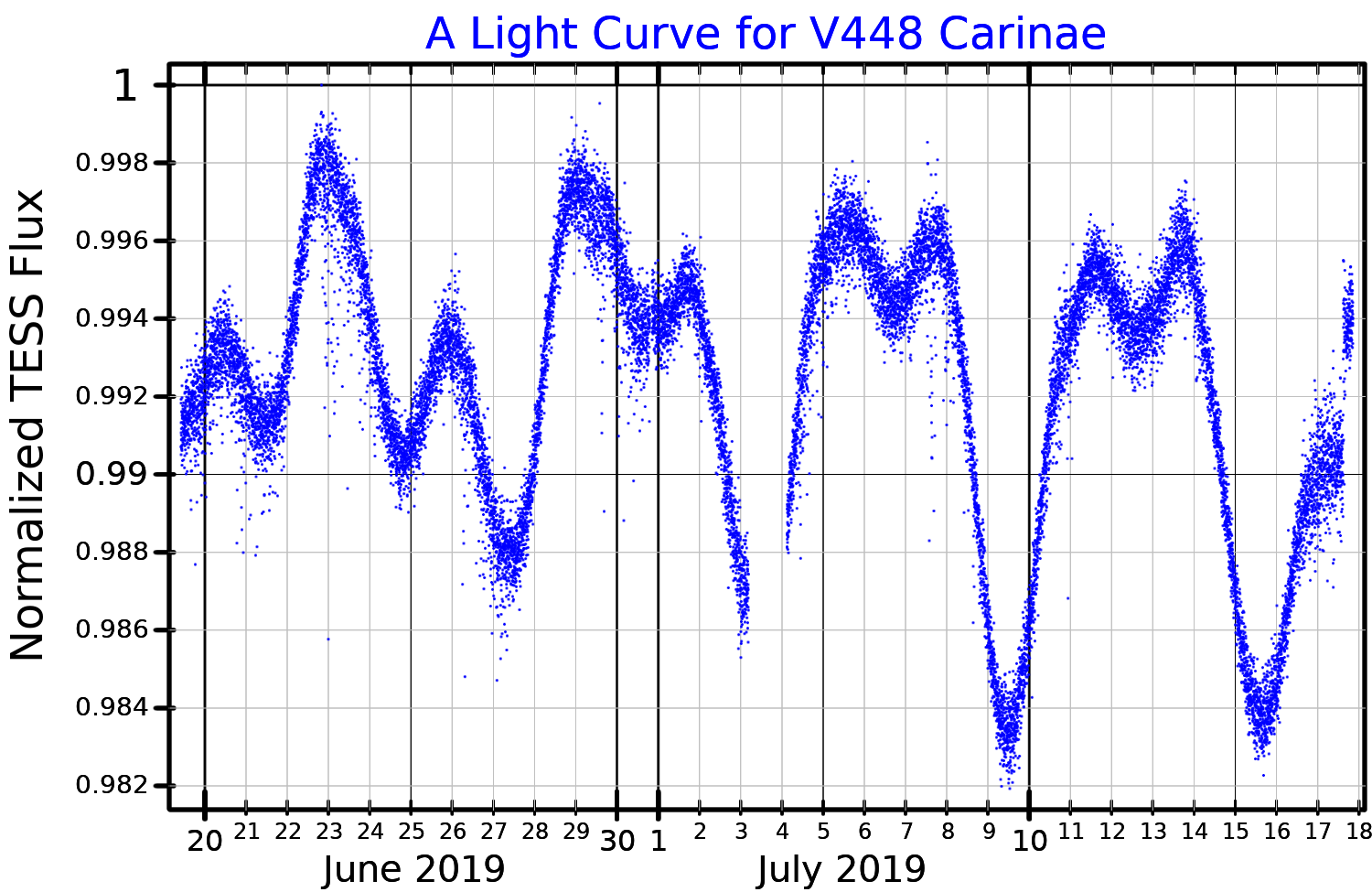
- A light curve for V448 Carinae, plotted from TESS data

Observation data Epoch J2000 Equinox ICRS
- Constellation: Carina
- Right ascension: 06^{h} 47^{m} 18.70799^{s}
- Declination: −55° 32′ 23.9659″
- Apparent magnitude (V): 5.60

Characteristics
- Spectral type: K5III
- Apparent magnitude (Hp): 5.66 to 5.86
- B−V color index: +1.549±0.010
- Variable type: SRd:

Astrometry
Radial velocity (R_{v})	+25.58±4.64 km/s
Proper motion (μ)	RA: −0.99 mas/yr Dec.: +25.05 mas/yr
Parallax (π)	4.8123±0.0860 mas
Distance	680 ± 10 ly (208 ± 4 pc)
Absolute magnitude (M_{V})	−0.72

Details
Mass	1.73 M_{☉}
Radius	50.90+1.15 −5.11 R_{☉}
Luminosity	582.2±12.9 L_{☉}
Temperature	3,974+216 −44 K
Age	2.85 Gyr

Other designations
- O Car, V448 Car, NSV 3220, CPD−55°1063, GC 8912, HD 49877, HIP 32531, HR 2526, SAO 234710

Database references
SIMBAD	data

V448 Carinae is a single star in the constellation Carina. It has the Bayer designation O Carinae, while V448 Carinae is the variable star designation. This object has an orange hue and is dimly visible to the naked eye with an apparent visual magnitude that fluctuates around 5.60. It is located at a distance of approximately 680 light years from the Sun based on parallax, and is drifting further away with a radial velocity of around +26 km/s.

This is an aging giant star with a stellar classification of K5III. Having exhausted the supply of hydrogen at its core, it has cooled and expanded off the main sequence and now has 51 times the girth of the Sun.

Analysis of the Hipparcos data showed that the star is a variable star. It was given its variable star designation in 1999. It is classified as a probable semiregular variable star with a sub-type of SRd and a brightness that varies from visual magnitude 5.66 down to 5.86 over a period of 56.5 days. The star is an estimated 2.85 billion years old with 1.73 times the mass of the Sun. It is radiating 582 times the luminosity of the Sun from its swollen photosphere at an effective temperature of 3,974 K.
