= Y Carinae =

Star in the constellation Carina

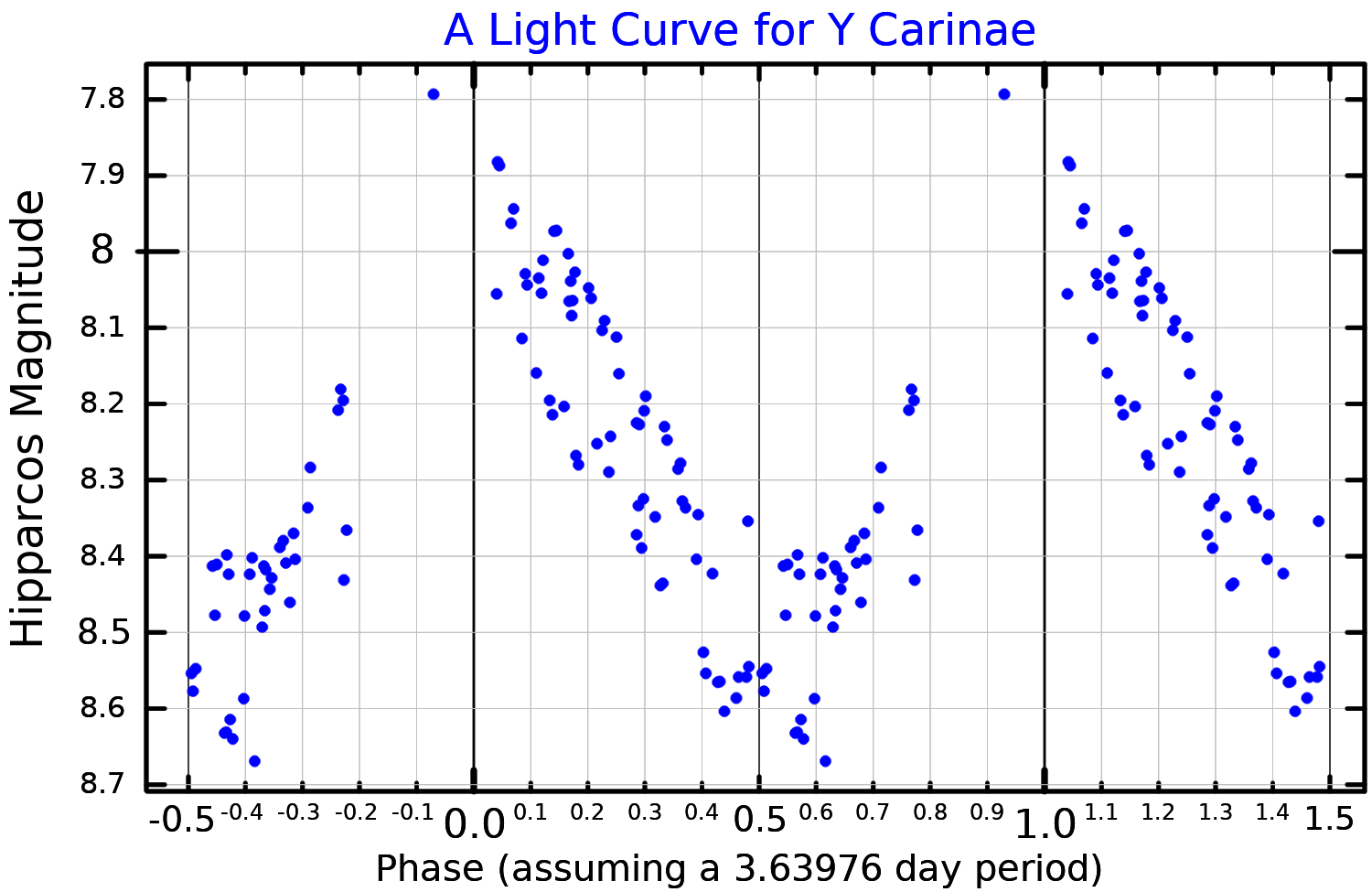
- A light curve for Y Carinae, plotted from Hipparcos data

Observation data Epoch J2000 Equinox ICRS
- Constellation: Carina
- Right ascension: 10^{h} 33^{m} 10.85133^{s}
- Declination: −58° 29′ 55.0959″
- Apparent magnitude (V): 7.53 – 8.48

Characteristics
- Spectral type: F0/3 + B9V
- B−V color index: +0.59
- Variable type: Classical Cepheid

Astrometry
Radial velocity (R_{v})	−12.90 km/s
Proper motion (μ)	RA: −5.83 mas/yr Dec.: 3.21 mas/yr
Parallax (π)	0.3011±0.0358 mas
Distance	approx. 11,000 ly (approx. 3,300 pc)
Absolute magnitude (M_{V})	−3.0

Orbit
Primary	A
Name	B
Period (P)	1006.9 days
Eccentricity (e)	0.437
Semi-amplitude (K_{1}) (primary)	10.0 km/s

Details

A
Mass	4.9 M_{☉}
Luminosity	1,250 L_{☉}
Surface gravity (log g)	1.800 cgs
Temperature	5,800 K
Metallicity	−0.230

Other designations
- Y Carinae, Y Car, CD−57°3305, GSC 08613-01464, HD 91595, HIP 51653, 2MASS J10331084-5829550, SAO 238178, Gaia DR2 5351428787262634624

Database references
SIMBAD	data

Y Carinae (Y Car) is a Classical Cepheid variable, a type of variable star, in the constellation Carina. Its apparent magnitude varies from 7.53 to 8.48.

Alexander W. Roberts discovered that the brightness of the star varies, in 1893. The primary Cepheid pulsation period is 3.6 days, but it also pulsates with a secondary period of 2.56 days. It is known as a double-mode Cepheid, or a beat Cepheid since the two periods interfere to produce slow variations at a beat frequency.

The variable primary star is in a triple system with a very close pair of hot main sequence stars. The period of the outer pair is 2.76 years. The inner pair are constrained to orbit in less than 31 days, but the exact nature of the orbit is unknown. The existence of the close binary pair throws into doubt previous calculations of the mass of the pulsating star. The existence of high numbers of triple systems and short period Cepheids suggests that some at least of the short period Cepheids may have formed by mergers.
