= HD 94476 =

Star in the constellation Carina

- Location of HD 94476 (circled)

Observation data Epoch J2000.0 Equinox ICRS
- Constellation: Carina
- Right ascension: 10^{h} 55^{m} 17.22180^{s}
- Declination: −60° 31′ 01.2040″
- Apparent magnitude (V): 5.93

Characteristics
- Evolutionary stage: Horizontal branch
- Spectral type: K0III
- B−V color index: +1.065±0.007
- Variable type: Constant

Astrometry
Radial velocity (R_{v})	−25.5±2.9 km/s
Proper motion (μ)	RA: −35.033 mas/yr Dec.: +85.430 mas/yr
Parallax (π)	11.6000±0.0287 mas
Distance	281.2 ± 0.7 ly (86.2 ± 0.2 pc)
Absolute magnitude (M_{V})	1.08

Details
Mass	2.7 M_{☉}
Radius	9.0 R_{☉}
Luminosity	44 L_{☉}
Surface gravity (log g)	2.85 cgs
Temperature	4,976 K
Metallicity [Fe/H]	−0.07 dex
Rotational velocity (v sin i)	2.2 km/s
Age	502 Myr

Other designations
- T Car, AAVSO 1051-59, CD−59°3419, CPD−59°2840, GC 15026, HD 94776, HIP 53394, HR 4271, SAO 251178

Database references
SIMBAD	data

HD 94476 is a star in the southern constellation of Carina. Although given the variable star designation T Carinae, it is now thought to be constant; the identifier HD 94776 from the Henry Draper catalogue may be used instead. It has an orange hue and is dimly visible to the naked eye with an apparent visual magnitude of 5.93. The distance to this object is 281 light years based on parallax, and it has an absolute magnitude of 1.08. It is drifting closer to the Sun with a radial velocity of −26 km/s.

This is an aging giant star with a stellar classification of K0III, which indicates it has exhausted the supply of hydrogen at its core and expanded off the main sequence. It is a red clump giant, which means it is on the horizontal branch and is undergoing core helium fusion. At present it has nine times the Sun's radius and is radiating 44 times the luminosity of the Sun from its photosphere at an effective temperature of 4,976 K.

When used as a comparison star for AG Carinae in 1914 by H. E. Wood, this object was announced as a candidate variable star. A year later it was determined by R. Innis that it was AG Carinae that varied and this star is constant. Later, T Carinae became flagged as a low amplitude irregular variable. It is now catalogued as a probable constant star.
