= N Carinae =

Star in the constellation Carina

- Location of N Carinae (circled in red)

Observation data Epoch J2000.0 Equinox ICRS
- Constellation: Carina
- Right ascension: 06^{h} 34^{m} 58.580^{s}
- Declination: −52° 58′ 32.19″
- Apparent magnitude (V): 4.35

Characteristics
- Spectral type: A0II or B9III
- B−V color index: −0.021±0.016

Astrometry
Radial velocity (R_{v})	+22.5±0.5 km/s
Proper motion (μ)	RA: −7.537 mas/yr Dec.: +10.643 mas/yr
Parallax (π)	1.9235±0.0926 mas
Distance	1,700 ± 80 ly (520 ± 30 pc)
Absolute magnitude (M_{V})	−3.75

Details
Mass	5.1±0.1 M_{☉}
Radius	20 R_{☉}
Luminosity	3,249 L_{☉}
Surface gravity (log g)	2.45±0.03 cgs
Temperature	9361±94 K
Metallicity [Fe/H]	−0.34±0.03 dex
Rotational velocity (v sin i)	47 km/s
Age	87±5 Myr

Other designations
- N Car, CPD−52°953, FK5 2508, GC 8604, HD 47306, HIP 31407, HR 2435, SAO 234589

Database references
SIMBAD	data

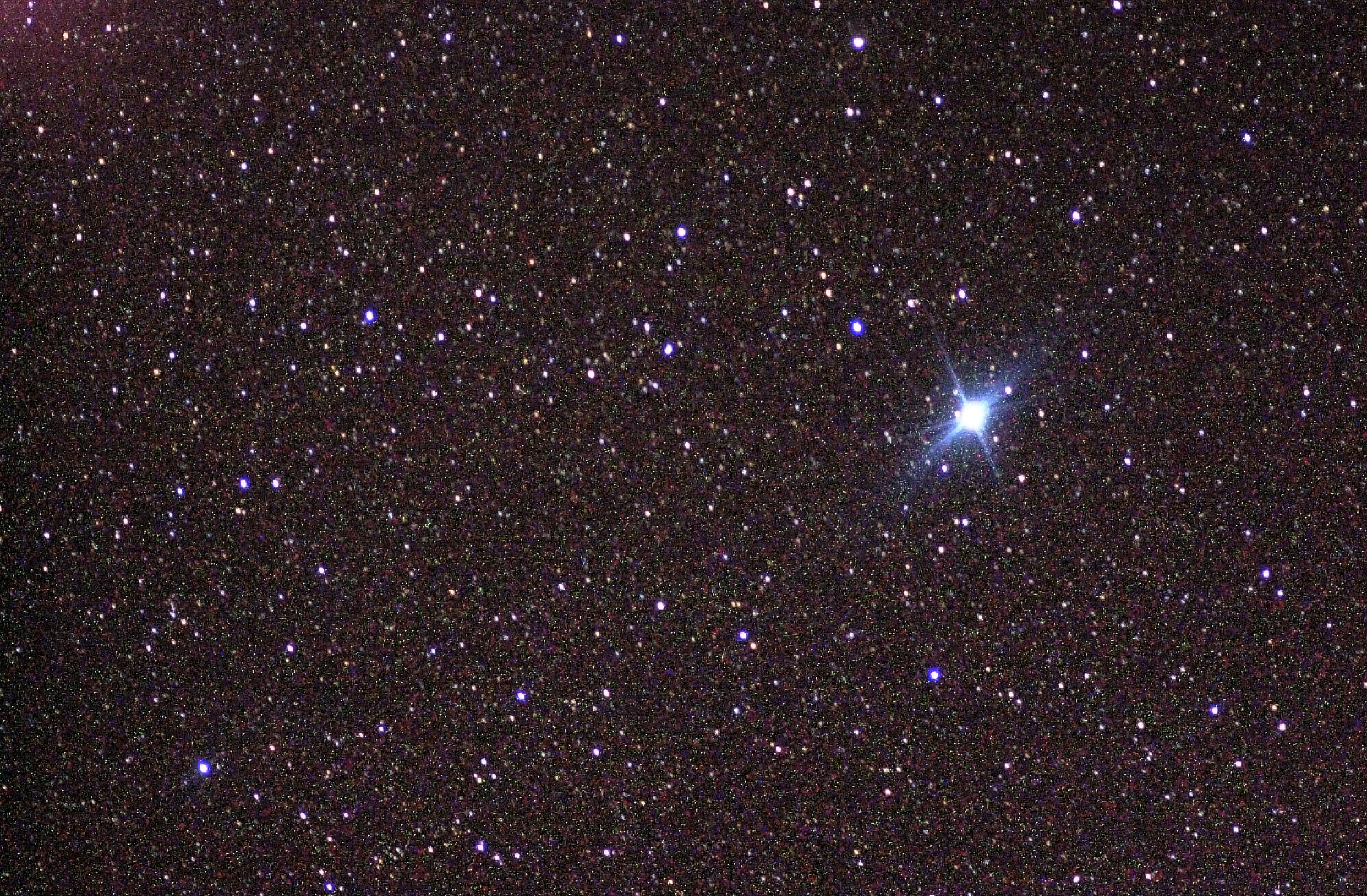

N Carinae is a single star in the constellation Carina, just to the northeast of the prominent star Canopus. Its name is a Bayer designation. This object has a white hue and is faintly visible to the naked eye with an apparent visual magnitude of 4.35. Based on parallax, it is located at a distance of approximately 1,700 light years from the Sun. It has an absolute magnitude of −3.75, and is drifting further away with a radial velocity of +22.5 km/s.

This object has a stellar classification of A0II, matching a massive bright giant. In the past it had received a class of B9III, which is sometimes still used. The star is 87 million years old with 5.1 times the mass of the Sun. It is spinning with a projected rotational velocity of 47 km/s. N Carinae is radiating 3,249 times the luminosity of the Sun from its photosphere at an effective temperature of 9,361 K.
