= WR 16 =

Wolf-Rayet star

Observation data Epoch J2000 Equinox ICRS
- Constellation: Carina
- Right ascension: 09^{h} 54^{m} 52.9034^{s}
- Declination: +57° 43′ 38.2746″
- Apparent magnitude (V): 8.36

Characteristics
- Evolutionary stage: Wolf-Rayet
- Spectral type: WN8h
- Variable type: WR, ellipsoidal

Astrometry
Proper motion (μ)	RA: −9.458 mas/yr Dec.: +5.054 mas/yr
Parallax (π)	0.438±0.0168 mas
Distance	7,400 ± 300 ly (2,280 ± 90 pc)
Absolute magnitude (M_{V})	−5.6

Details
Mass	19 M_{☉}
Radius	11.56 R_{☉}
Luminosity	525,000 L_{☉}
Temperature	44,700 K

Other designations
- Hen 3-342, V396 Carinae, HD 86161, HIP 48617, SAO 237491

Database references
SIMBAD	data

WR 16 (HD 86161) is a Wolf-Rayet star located in the constellation Carina. It is a massive, luminous, and evolved star in a late stage of evolution, surrounded by a complex nebula formed by its strong stellar winds and past mass ejections. WR 16 is classified as a runaway star due to its high velocity through the interstellar medium.

== Physical characteristics ==
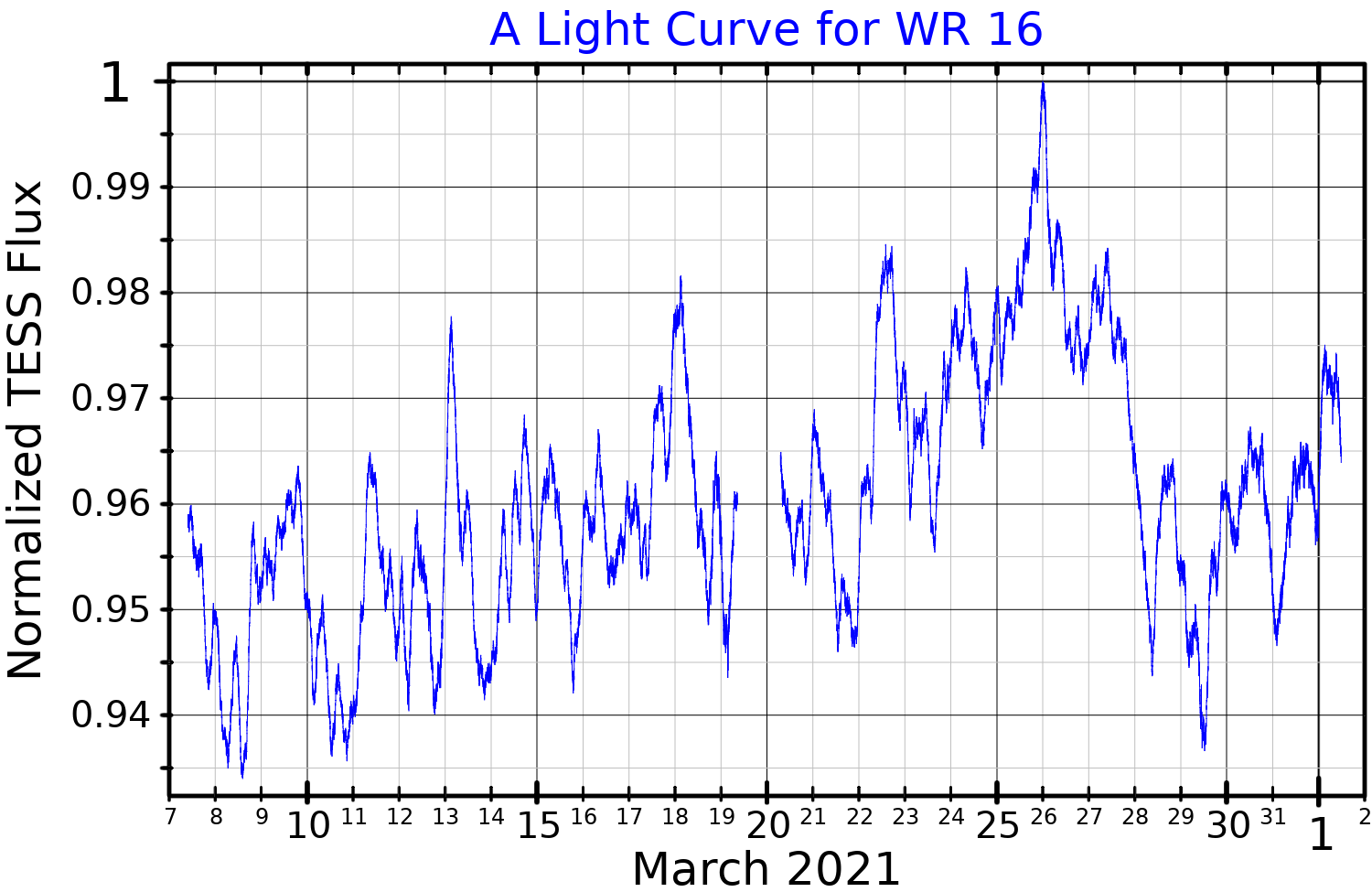
A light curve for WR 16, plotted from TESS data

WR 16 is classified as a WN8h star, indicating a hydrogen-rich Wolf-Rayet star dominated by nitrogen emission lines. Its effective temperature of over 40,000 K is hotter than the Sun's typical value of 5,772 K, but cooler than many other WR stars.

WR 16 is a rotating ellipsoidal variable, meaning its brightness and shape change slightly due to rotation.

== Runaway status ==
Motion measurements from the Gaia satellite show that WR 16 moves at about 61 km/s relative to its local interstellar medium, qualifying it as a runaway star. This rapid motion influences the shape of its surrounding nebula.

== Nebular structure ==
WR 16 is surrounded by a bubble-like nebula formed by material ejected in previous evolutionary stages and shaped by its strong stellar winds. Observations reveal a round, bubble-shaped nebula visible in optical and infrared wavelengths. Multiple rings surround the star, likely from episodic mass ejections during its earlier Luminous Blue Variable (LBV) phase. Ionized hydrogen (H II regions) and nitrogen-enriched gas are present, indicating processed stellar material.

== Bow shock ==
Due to its high velocity, WR 16 creates a bow shock—a curved front where its stellar wind collides with the interstellar medium, compressing gas and dust. Radio and infrared imaging confirms the bow shock’s presence.
