= HH Carinae =

Spectroscopic binary in Carina

Observation data Epoch J2000 Equinox ICRS
- Constellation: Carina
- Right ascension: 10^{h} 53^{m} 36.67^{s}
- Declination: −59° 27′ 17.8″
- Apparent magnitude (V): 10.30 to 10.82

Characteristics
- Apparent magnitude (U): 10.13
- Apparent magnitude (B): 10.79±0.99
- Apparent magnitude (G): 10.22±0.01
- Apparent magnitude (R): 10.37±0.05
- Apparent magnitude (J): 9.28±0.03
- Apparent magnitude (H): 9.12±0.04
- Apparent magnitude (K): 8.92±0.03
- Variable type: EA/DM

Primary
- Evolutionary stage: Main-sequence star
- Spectral type: O9 V
- U−B color index: -1.093 (intrinsic) -0.68 (observed)
- B−V color index: -0.304 (intrinsic); 0.27 (observed)

Secondary
- Evolutionary stage: Blue giant or subgiant
- Spectral type: B0 III–IV

Astrometry
Total velocity	−15.9±3.0 km/s
Proper motion (μ)	RA: −5.339±0.016 mas/yr Dec.: 2.559±0.015 mas/yr
Parallax (π)	0.2274±0.0146 mas
Distance	4654±795 pc

Primary
Absolute magnitude (M_{V})	−3.10±0.19
Absolute bolometric magnitude (M_{bol})	−6.32±0.15

Secondary
Absolute magnitude (M_{V})	−4.24±0.88
Absolute bolometric magnitude (M_{bol})	−6.90±0.23

Position (relative to Primary)
Component	Secondary
Projected separation	0.129±0.004 AU

Orbit
Period (P)	3.231515 d
Inclination (i)	80.90±0.09°
Semi-amplitude (K_{1}) (primary)	161±4 km/s
Semi-amplitude (K_{2}) (secondary)	268±9 km/s

Details

Primary
Mass	17.2±1.2 M_{☉}
Radius	4.86±0.18 R_{☉}
Luminosity	22230+2830 −2510 L_{☉}
Surface gravity (log g)	4.30±0.06 cgs
Temperature	33500±2500 K
Rotational velocity (v sin i)	220±30 km/s

Secondary
Mass	10.3±0.9 M_{☉}
Radius	9.35±0.31 R_{☉}
Luminosity	37500+3240 −2990 L_{☉}
Surface gravity (log g)	3.51±0.07 cgs
Temperature	27500±2500 K
Rotational velocity (v sin i)	150±5 km/s

Other designations
- HH Car, HD 303503, ALS 2008, AN 197.1937, CPD-58 2839, CPD-58 2840, GEN# -0.05802840, GEN# +1.00303503, Hen 3-516, LLNS 3217, LS 2008, SBC9 644, TYC 8627-2390-1, UBV M 29272, UCAC4 153-058535, uvby98 100303503, WEB 9674

Database references
SIMBAD	data

HH Carinae is a semidetached spectroscopic and eclipsing binary in the constellation of Carina. It consists of an O-type main-sequence star and a blue giant or subgiant.

== Observational history ==
HH Carinae was first observed in the late 1890s at Cape Observatory by astronomers Sir David Gill and Jacobus Cornelius Kapteyn in the Cape Photographic Durchmusterung. It was later added to the General Catalogue of Variable Stars between 1948 and 1968 and was first characterised in 1968.

It was characterised in detail in 1985 and in 2021.

== Star system ==
HH Carinae consists of two stars with respective spectral types of O9 V and B0 III–IV. The less massive B-type component is tidally locked to the more massive O-type component.

Its distance based on the parallax provided in Gaia DR3 is 4398±266 pc. This is consistent with the photometric distance derived from a visual extinction of 1.722, of 4654±795 pc.

=== Primary ===
The primary has a rotational velocity of 220 km s^{-1}, nearly three times faster than its synchronous rotational velocity of 76±2 km s^{-1}. This is attributed to roche lobe overflow from the secondary, which speeds up the primary's rotation. It is smaller, less luminous but more massive than the secondary.

=== Secondary ===
The secondary has filled its roche lobe and is tidally locked to the primary. It having left the main-sequence indicates that it has lost a significant amount of mass. It is estimated to lose mass at a rate of approximately 1×10^{−6} M_{☉} yr^{-1}, however, to be measured with high accuracy, orbital period analysis would be required.

It has been identified as having spectral type B0 III–IV due to its strong Si_{IV} and O_{II} lines that are observed as it passes in front of the primary.

=== Circumstellar envelope ===
The system is surrounded by a circumstellar envelope, identifiable due to a double peak in Hα emission, with an effective temperature of 22000±3000 K. It is heterogeneous as its temperature and density vary slightly, likely due to interaction between stellar winds and matter transferred from the secondary to the L_{1} point. The inner shell has a radius of 27.8±1.3 R_{☉} and the outer shell has one of 32.2±2.2 R_{☉}.

== OB association membership ==
Due to the system's presumed young age, it is likely to have originated from an OB association. The two nearest known associations to HH Carinae are Car OB1 and Car OB2, which have respective space velocities of (U, V, W) = (−66.0±1.0, −15.0±1.6, −8.9±0.9) km s^{-1} and (U, V, W) = (−78.9±2.4, −25.1±2.3, −9.7±2.4) km s^{-1}, inconsistent with the (U, V, W) = (−124.36±16.31, −3.72±1.37, −24.65±5.53) km s^{-1}, suggesting that it is unrelated to both and may have otherwise formed in an undiscovered association.
