= HD 91496 =

Giant star in the constellation Carina

- Location of HD 91496 (circled in red)

Observation data Epoch J2000.0 Equinox ICRS
- Constellation: Carina
- Right ascension: 10^{h} 31^{m} 02.057^{s}
- Declination: −73° 13′ 17.38″
- Apparent magnitude (V): 4.92

Characteristics
- Evolutionary stage: giant
- Spectral type: K4/5 III
- Variable type: suspected

Astrometry
Radial velocity (R_{v})	13.14 km/s
Proper motion (μ)	RA: −7.00 mas/yr Dec.: +7.66 mas/yr
Parallax (π)	3.1223±0.1500 mas
Distance	1,040 ± 50 ly (320 ± 20 pc)
Absolute magnitude (M_{V})	−2.55

Details
Mass	6 M_{☉}
Radius	115 R_{☉}
Luminosity	2,787 L_{☉}
Surface gravity (log g)	1.34 cgs
Temperature	3,915 K
Rotational velocity (v sin i)	5.7 km/s

Other designations
- CD−72°614, HD 91496, HIP 51495, HR 4142, SAO 256723

Database references
SIMBAD	data

HD 91496 (HR 4142) is a giant star in the constellation Carina, with an apparent magnitude is 4.92 and an MK spectral class of K4/5 III. It has been suspected of varying in brightness, but this has not been confirmed.

HD 91496 has a faint companion, six magnitudes fainter and 33″ away. It is a distant background star.
