= CPD−57°2874 =

Star in the constellation Carina

Observation data Epoch J2000 Equinox ICRS
- Constellation: Carina
- Right ascension: 10^{h} 15^{m} 21.9711^{s}
- Declination: −57° 51′ 42.713″
- Apparent magnitude (V): +10.08

Characteristics
- Spectral type: sgB1[e]
- U−B color index: +0.30
- B−V color index: +1.65
- Variable type: suspected

Astrometry
Radial velocity (R_{v})	−54 km/s
Proper motion (μ)	RA: −5.90 mas/yr Dec.: 5.10 mas/yr
Distance	3,440 pc
Absolute magnitude (M_{V})	−7.7

Details
Mass	17.4–18.6 M_{☉}
Radius	60 R_{☉}
Luminosity	500,000 L_{☉}
Temperature	20,000 K
Rotational velocity (v sin i)	36 ± 4 km/s

Other designations
- CD−57°3107, CPD−57°2874, GSC 08608-00427, PPM 769178

Database references
SIMBAD	data

CPD−57°2874 is a B[e] supergiant in the constellation Carina. It is a rare star as it is hot but has dust which shows forbidden lines and IR emissions. In 2007 the high spatial and spectral resolution of the star's circumstellar envelope was studied. This was the first time such a study was carried out on a class B[e] supergiant.

== Disc ==
CPD−57°2874 is surrounded by a disc of expelled stellar material. The inner edge of the disc is 27.5 AU from the star and it is inclined at an angle of 46° to us. The particular alignment, temperature, and density of the disc combine to produce the forbidden spectral lines. The detached ring leads to speculation that the inner regions are cleared by an unseen binary companion.

== Variability ==
Photometry of CPD−57°2874 suggests that its brightness is variable with an amplitude of perhaps 0.2 magnitude. It has not been formally classified as a variable star and the cause of the variations is unclear.

== See also ==
- 3 Puppis
- HD 37974
- HD 268835
