= HD 95109 =

Star in the constellation Carina

- Location of U Carinae (circled)

Observation data Epoch J2000 Equinox ICRS
- Constellation: Carina
- Right ascension: 10^{h} 57^{m} 48.18690^{s}
- Declination: −59° 43′ 55.8872″
- Apparent magnitude (V): 5.72 - 6.90

Characteristics
- Evolutionary stage: Yellow supergiant
- Spectral type: F6-G7 Iab
- Variable type: δ Cep

Astrometry
Proper motion (μ)	RA: −5.963 mas/yr Dec.: +2.397 mas/yr
Parallax (π)	0.553±0.0226 mas
Distance	6,187±218 ly (1898±67 pc)
Absolute magnitude (M_{V})	−5.27

Details
Mass	7.5 - 11.7 M_{☉}
Radius	187±5 R_{☉}
Luminosity	26,642±1,584 L_{☉}
Surface gravity (log g)	1.2 cgs
Temperature	5,397 – 5,980 K
Metallicity	+0.01
Age	29 Myr

Other designations
- U Car, CD−59°3448, HD 95109, HR 4276, HIP 52589

Database references
SIMBAD	data

HD 95109 (U Carinae) is a Classical Cepheid variable, a type of variable star, in the constellation Carina. Its apparent magnitude is 6.86.

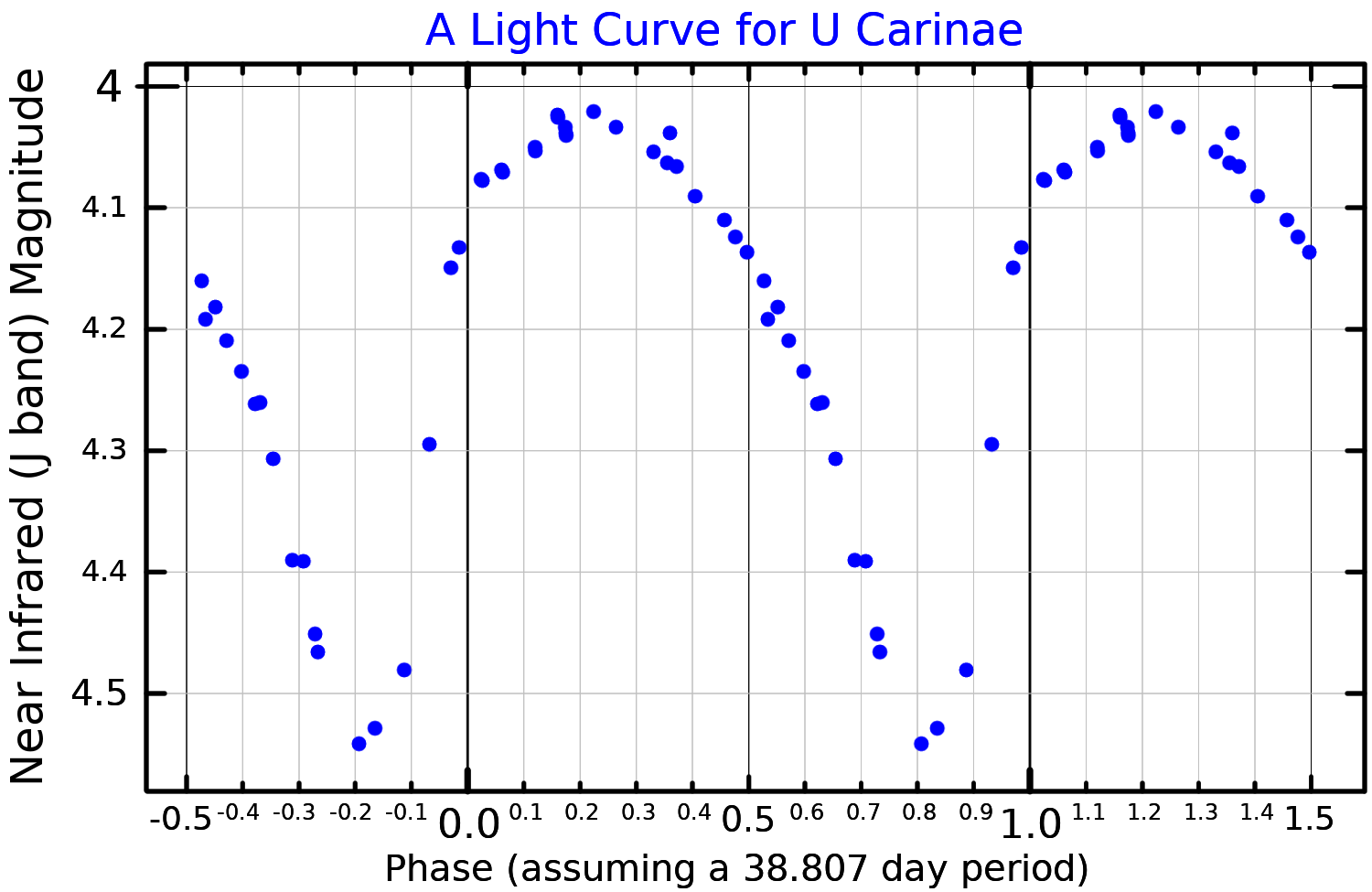
A near-infrared (J band) light curve for U Carinae, adapted from Laney and Stobie (1992)

U Car is a δ Cepheid variable with a period of 38.7681 days. Isaac Roberts discovered that the star's brightness varies in 1891, and it was one of the earliest Cepheids to be discovered. It has also one of the longest periods, and hence is one of the most luminous in the class. There are still only a few Cepheids with longer periods, including RS Puppis, SV Vulpeculae, and the unusual S Vulpeculae.

The brightness variation in U Car is caused by fundamental mode pulsations. The radius and temperature both vary, with the radius changing by 42 R_{☉} during each cycle. The temperature variation causes the spectral type to vary between F6 and G7.
