= HD 94510 =

Star in the constellation Carina

- Location of u Carinae (circled in red)

Observation data Epoch J2000 Equinox ICRS
- Constellation: Carina
- Right ascension: 10^{h} 53^{m} 29.65524^{s}
- Declination: −58° 51′ 11.4163″
- Apparent magnitude (V): +3.78 (3.75–3.80)

Characteristics
- Evolutionary stage: subgiant
- Spectral type: K0IV or K1III
- B−V color index: +0.945±0.005
- Variable type: suspected

Astrometry
Radial velocity (R_{v})	+8.10±0.70 km/s
Proper motion (μ)	RA: +79.01±0.13 mas/yr Dec.: +38.47±0.12 mas/yr
Parallax (π)	34.33±0.13 mas
Distance	95.0 ± 0.4 ly (29.1 ± 0.1 pc)
Absolute magnitude (M_{V})	1.46

Details
Mass	1.90±0.06 M_{☉}
Radius	6.90±0.10 R_{☉}
Luminosity	26.85±0.55 L_{☉}
Surface gravity (log g)	3.020±0.069 cgs
Temperature	5,006±25 K
Metallicity [Fe/H]	−0.07±0.06 dex

Other designations
- u Car, NSV 5011, CPD−58°2834, GC 14980, GJ 404.1, HD 94510, HIP 53253, HR 4257, SAO 238574, CCDM J10535-5851

Database references
SIMBAD	data

HD 94510 is a single star in the southern constellation of Carina, positioned near the northern constellation border with Vela. It has the Bayer designation u Carinae; HD 94520 is the identifier from the Henry Draper Catalogue. This object has an orange hue and is visible to the naked eye with an apparent visual magnitude that fluctuates around +3.78. The star is located at a distance of 95 light-years from the Sun based on parallax, and is drifting further away with a radial velocity of +8 km/s.

This is a K-type star in the subgiant or giant stage with a stellar classification of K0IV, or K1III which indicates it has exhausted the supply of hydrogen at its core and is evolving into a giant. HD 94510 is a suspected variable star with a brightness that has been measured varying from magnitude 3.75 down to 3.80. It has an estimated 1.90 times the mass of the Sun and has expanded to 6.9 times the Sun's radius. The star is radiating 27 times the luminosity of the Sun from its enlarged photosphere at an effective temperature of 5,006 K.
