= HR 4177 =

Star in the constellation Carina

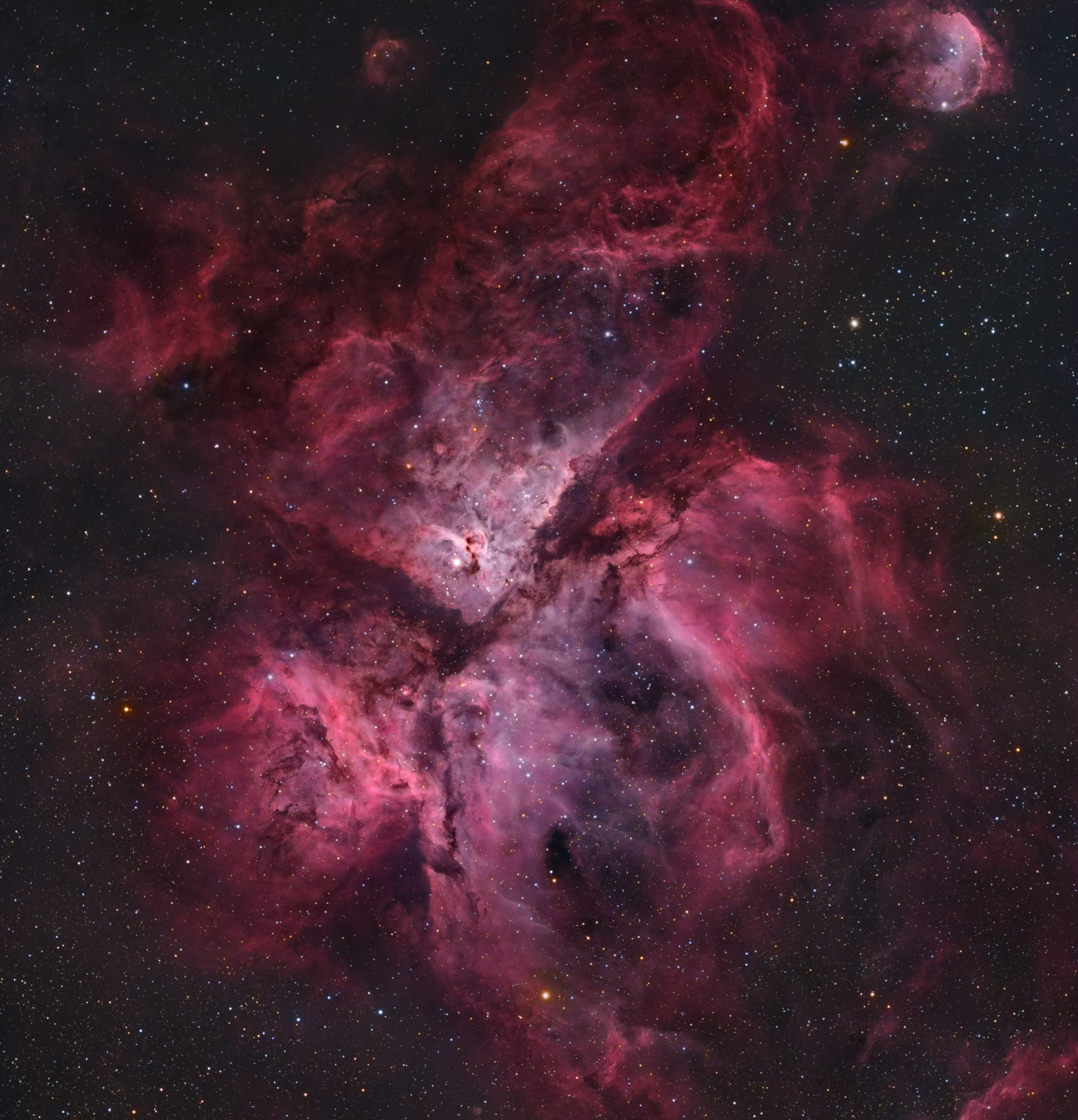
- Carina Nebula with HR 4177 circled towards top right

Observation data Epoch J2000 Equinox J2000
- Constellation: Carina
- Right ascension: 10^{h} 38^{m} 44.99524^{s}
- Declination: −59° 10′ 58.7927″
- Apparent magnitude (V): 4.77 (4.85 + 7.67)

Characteristics

A
- Spectral type: K4.5Ib-II
- B−V color index: 1.562±0.015

B
- Spectral type: B9II/III
- B−V color index: 0.100±0.020

Astrometry

A
| Radial velocity (R_{v}) | +11.0±0.8 km/s |
| Proper motion (μ) | RA: −14.284±0.338 mas/yr Dec.: +1.117±0.329 mas/yr |
| Parallax (π) | 2.0056±0.1809 mas |
| Distance | 1,600 ± 100 ly (500 ± 40 pc) |
| Absolute magnitude (M_{V}) | −3.66 |

B
| Proper motion (μ) | RA: −14.208±0.036 mas/yr Dec.: 0.968±0.030 mas/yr |
| Parallax (π) | 2.2858±0.0334 mas |
| Distance | 1,430 ± 20 ly (437 ± 6 pc) |

Details

A
| Mass | 11.9±0.2 M_{☉} |
| Radius | 202+5 −6 R_{☉} |
| Luminosity | 8,478±875 L_{☉} |
| Temperature | 3,900+63 −48 K |
| Age | 16.4±1.0 Myr |

B
| Mass | 3.46±0.61 M_{☉} |
| Radius | 3.42+1.01 −0.11 R_{☉} |
| Luminosity | 1,991+800 −600 L_{☉} |
| Surface gravity (log g) | 3.94+0.90 −0.67 cgs |
| Temperature | 12,267+736 −101 K |
| Metallicity [Fe/H] | 0.77+0.73 −0.31 dex |

Other designations
- t^{2} Car, CPD−58°2460, HR 4177, CCDM J10388-5911, WDS J10387-5911
- A: GC 14647, HD 92397, HIP 52102, SAO 238295
- B: GC 14649, HD 92398, HIP 52106, SAO 238297

Database references
| SIMBAD | A |
- B

HR 4177, also called t^{2} Carinae (t^{2}Car), is a double star in the southern constellation of Carina. It is faintly visible to the naked eye with a combined apparent visual magnitude of +4.77. The two components are HD 92397 and HD 92398. The primary component is located at a distance of approximately 1,600 light years from the Sun based on parallax, and is drifting further away with a radial velocity of +11 km/s. It has a peculiar velocity of 24.3+9.9
−16.1 km/s and may be a runaway star. The star is a member of the BH 99 cluster.

The magnitude 4.85 primary, component A, is a massive K-type supergiant or bright giant with a stellar classification of K4.5Ib-II. Houk (1978) instead listed it with a class of K4/5III: but with some uncertainty about the classification. It has 12 times the mass of the Sun and has expanded to 202 times the Sun's radius. The star is radiating 8,478 times the luminosity of the Sun from its bloated photosphere at an effective temperature of 3,900 K.

The magnitude 7.48 companion star, component B, was discovered by J. Dunlop in 1829. As of 2015, it was located at an angular separation of 14.60″ along a position angle of 21°, relative to the primary. It is a B-type giant/bright giant star with a class of B9II/III. The pair show a common proper motion and roughly similar parallax measurements, but it remains unclear whether they form a gravitationally-bound pair.
