= V520 Carinae =

Star in the constellation Carina

- Location of V520 Carinae (circled in red)

Observation data Epoch J2000 Equinox ICRS
- Constellation: Carina
- Right ascension: 10^{h} 43^{m} 32.28949^{s}
- Declination: −60° 33′ 59.8348″
- Apparent magnitude (V): 4.50 to 4.59

Characteristics
- Spectral type: K4III
- B−V color index: +1.700±0.059
- Variable type: Lc:

Astrometry
Radial velocity (R_{v})	+9.1±0.3 km/s
Proper motion (μ)	RA: −15.425 mas/yr Dec.: +2.872 mas/yr
Parallax (π)	2.2008±0.1027 mas
Distance	1,500+68 −62 ly (460+21 −19 pc)
Absolute magnitude (M_{V})	−3.63

Details
Mass	7.9±0.1 M_{☉}
Radius	217 R_{☉}
Luminosity	12‚758 L_{☉}
Surface gravity (log g)	1.26 cgs
Temperature	3‚745 K
Metallicity [Fe/H]	−0.31 dex
Rotational velocity (v sin i)	<1.9 km/s
Age	33.3±5.1 Myr

Other designations
- w Car, V520 Car, NSV 4951, CD−59°3262, FK5 2524, GC 14762, HD 93070, HIP 52468, HR 4200, SAO 251090

Database references
SIMBAD	data

V520 Carinae is a single star in the southern constellation of Carina. It has the Bayer designation w Carinae, while V520 Carinae is a variable star designation. The star has an orange hue and is faintly visible to the naked eye with an apparent visual magnitude that fluctuates around +4.5. It is located at a distance of approximately 1,500 light years from the Sun based on parallax, and it is drifting further away with a radial velocity of +9 km/s. It is a candidate member of the IC 2391 moving group of co-moving stars.

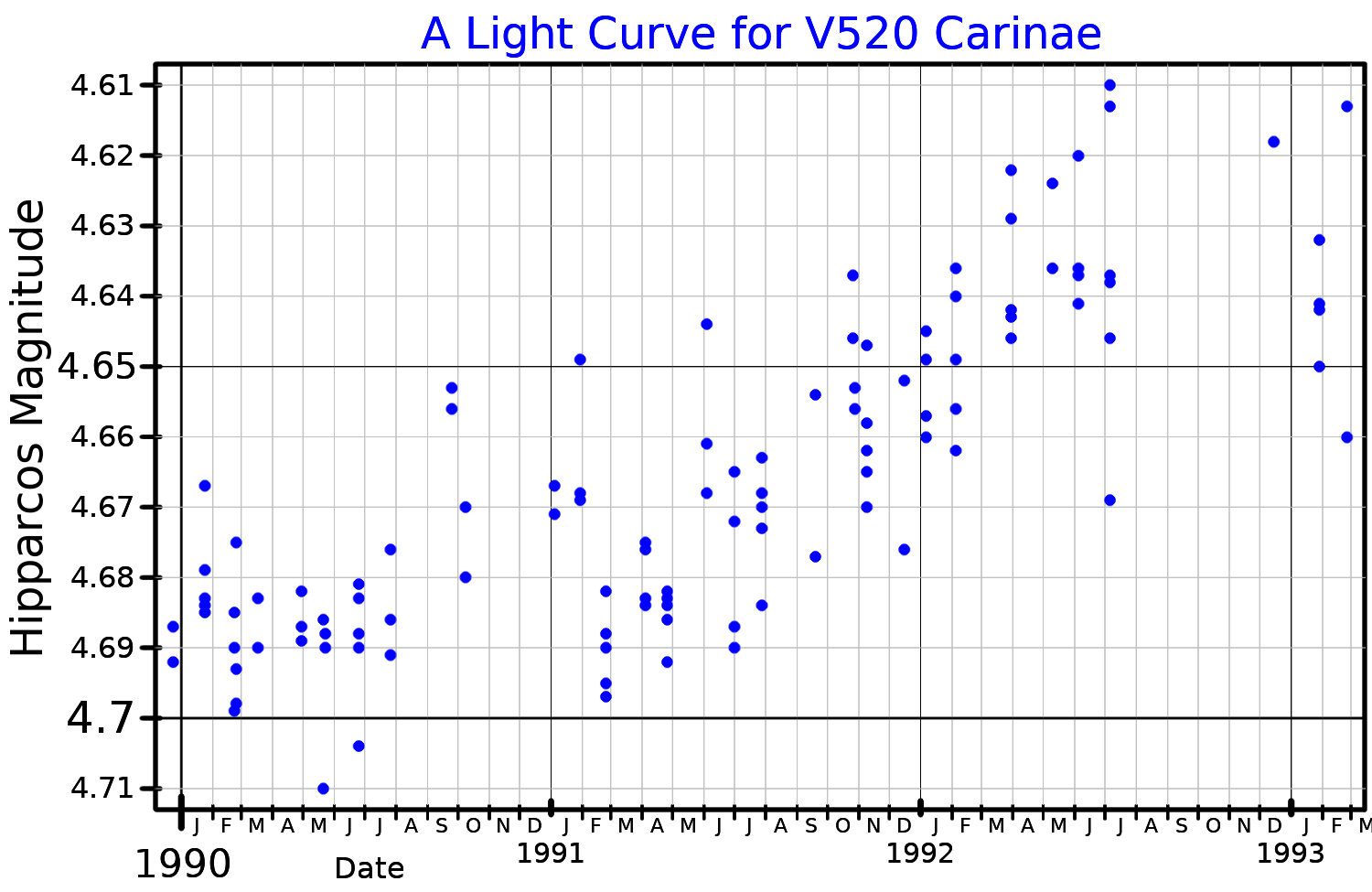
A light curve for V520 Carinae, plotted from Hipparcos data

This is an aging giant star with a stellar classification of K4III, although Humphreys (1970) found a supergiant class of K3Ib. It was found to be a variable star when the Hipparcos data was analyzed, and for that reason it was given a variable star designation in 1999. It is a slow irregular variable of type Lc and its brightness varies from magnitude +4.50 to +4.59 with no periodicity. The star now has 217 times the radius of the Sun, having exhausted the supply of hydrogen at its core then cooled and expanded. Comparison with theoretical evolutionary tracks suggests it is 33 million years old with 7.9 times the mass of the Sun. The star is radiating 12,000 times the luminosity of the Sun from its enlarged photosphere at an effective temperature of 3,745 K.
