= HD 92063 =

Star in the constellation Carina

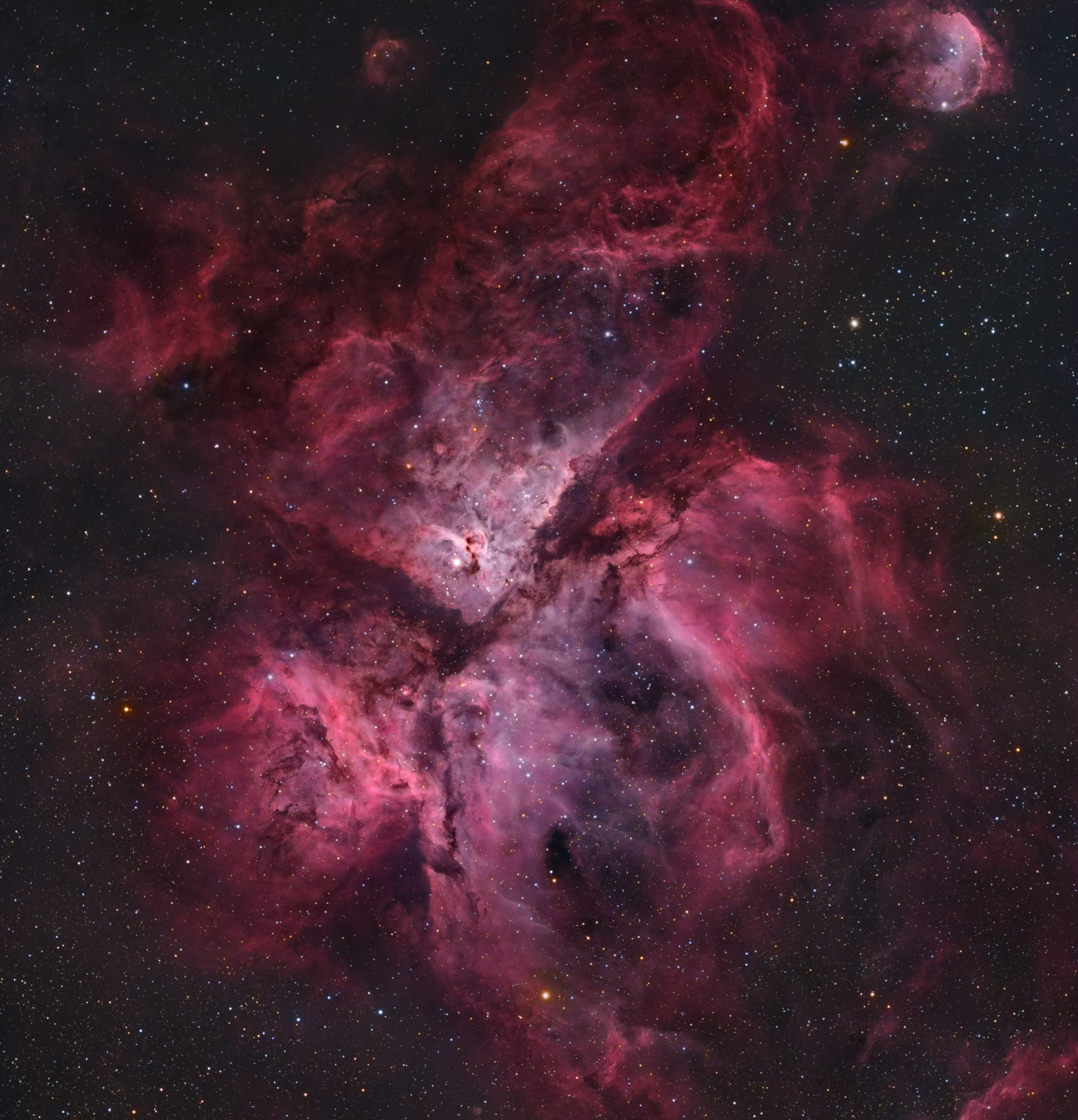
- Carina Nebula with HD 92603 circled near the right edge of the frame

Observation data Epoch J2000 Equinox ICRS
- Constellation: Carina
- Right ascension: 10^{h} 36^{m} 20.51819^{s}
- Declination: −59° 33′ 51.8102″
- Apparent magnitude (V): 5.08

Characteristics
- Spectral type: K1III
- B−V color index: 1.172±0.005
- Variable type: suspected

Astrometry
Radial velocity (R_{v})	−10.15±0.19 km/s
Proper motion (μ)	RA: −40.984±0.229 mas/yr Dec.: −39.180±0.226 mas/yr
Parallax (π)	13.2367±0.1354 mas
Distance	246 ± 3 ly (75.5 ± 0.8 pc)
Absolute magnitude (M_{V})	0.55

Details
Mass	1.2 M_{☉}
Radius	13.85+0.26 −1.17 R_{☉}
Luminosity	72.1±0.9 L_{☉}
Surface gravity (log g)	2.25 cgs
Temperature	4,520+204 −41 K
Metallicity [Fe/H]	+0.02 dex
Rotational velocity (v sin i)	<1.2 km/s

Other designations
- t^{1} Car, NSV 4909, CPD−58°2371, GC 14594, HD 92063, HIP 51912, HR 4164, SAO 238242

Database references
SIMBAD	data

HD 92063 is a single star in the southern constellation of Carina. It has the Bayer designation t^{1} Carinae, while HD 92063 is the star's identifier from the Henry Draper Catalogue. This is a suspected variable star and is visible to the naked eye with an apparent visual magnitude of 5.08. The star is located at a distance of approximately 246 light years from the Sun based on parallax, but is drifting closer with a radial velocity of −10 km/s. Although it appears at the edge of the Carina Nebula, it is much closer than the nebula. It is also not considered a member of the nearby Alessi 5 open cluster of stars.

This is an aging K-type giant star with a stellar classification of K1III, having exhausted the supply of hydrogen at its core then cooled and expanded off the main sequence. At present it has 14 times the radius of the Sun. The star is radiating 72 times the Sun's luminosity from its enlarged photosphere at an effective temperature of 4,520 K.
