= HD 96566 =

Star in the constellation Carina

- Location of HD 96566 (circled in red)

Observation data Epoch J2000 Equinox ICRS
- Constellation: Carina
- Right ascension: 11^{h} 06^{m} 32.42648^{s}
- Declination: −62° 25′ 26.8106″
- Apparent magnitude (V): +4.62

Characteristics
- Evolutionary stage: red giant branch
- Spectral type: G7.5III
- B−V color index: 0.988±0.065

Astrometry
Radial velocity (R_{v})	−1.45±0.12 km/s
Proper motion (μ)	RA: −37.621±0.099 mas/yr Dec.: +9.269±0.105 mas/yr
Parallax (π)	8.5066±0.0862 mas
Distance	383 ± 4 ly (118 ± 1 pc)
Absolute magnitude (M_{V})	−0.81

Details
Mass	3.70 M_{☉}
Radius	21.3 R_{☉}
Luminosity	242 L_{☉}
Surface gravity (log g)	2.53 cgs
Temperature	4,938 K
Metallicity [Fe/H]	0.06 dex
Rotational velocity (v sin i)	7.84 km/s
Age	202 Myr

Other designations
- z^{1} Carinae, CPD−61°2067, GC 15288, GJ 9345, HD 96566, HIP 54301, HR 4325, SAO 251269

Database references
SIMBAD	data

HD 96566 is a single star in the southern constellation of Carina. It has the Bayer designation z^{1} Carinae; HD 96566 is the identifier from the Henry Draper Catalogue. This object has a yellow hue and is visible to the naked eye with an apparent visual magnitude of +4.62. The star is located at a distance of approximately 383 light years from the Sun based on parallax, but is drifting closer with a radial velocity of −1 km/s. It has an absolute magnitude of −0.81.

This is an aging G-type giant star with a stellar classification of G7.5III, which indicates it has exhausted the supply of hydrogen at its core then cooled and expanded off the main sequence. It has an estimated 3.7 times the mass of the Sun and has grown to 21 times the Sun's radius. The metallicity, or abundance of elements other than hydrogen and helium, is about the same as in the Sun. It is radiating about 242 times the Sun's luminosity from its photosphere at an effective temperature of 4,913 K.
