= Ophiuchus in Chinese astronomy =

The modern constellation Ophiuchus lies across two of the quadrants symbolized by the Azure Dragon of the East (東方青龍, Dōng Fāng Qīng Lóng) and the Black Tortoise of the North (北方玄武, Běi Fāng Xuán Wǔ), and Three Enclosures (三垣, Sān Yuán), that divide the sky in traditional Chinese uranography.

The name of the western constellation in modern Chinese is 蛇夫座 (shé fū zuò), which means "the snake man constellation".

== Stars ==
The map of Chinese constellation in constellation Ophiuchus area consists of :

Four Symbols	Mansion (Chinese name)	Romanization	Translation	Asterisms (Chinese name)	Romanization	Translation	Western star name	Proper Name	Chinese star name	Romanization	Translation
Three Enclosures (三垣)	天市垣	Tiān Shì Yuán	Heavenly Market enclosure	天市左垣	Tiānshìzuǒyuán	Left Wall					
Three Enclosures (三垣)	天市垣	Tiān Shì Yuán	Heavenly Market enclosure	天市左垣	Tiānshìzuǒyuán	Left Wall	ν Oph				
Three Enclosures (三垣)	天市垣	Tiān Shì Yuán	Heavenly Market enclosure	天市左垣	Tiānshìzuǒyuán	Left Wall	ν Oph		天市左垣九	Tiānshìzuǒyuánjiǔ	9th star
Three Enclosures (三垣)	天市垣	Tiān Shì Yuán	Heavenly Market enclosure	天市左垣	Tiānshìzuǒyuán	Left Wall	ν Oph		燕	Yān	(Star of) Yan
Three Enclosures (三垣)	天市垣	Tiān Shì Yuán	Heavenly Market enclosure	天市左垣	Tiānshìzuǒyuán	Left Wall	η Oph	Sabik (for component A)			
Three Enclosures (三垣)	天市垣	Tiān Shì Yuán	Heavenly Market enclosure	天市左垣	Tiānshìzuǒyuán	Left Wall	η Oph	Sabik (for component A)	天市左垣十一	Tiānshìzuǒyuánshíyī	11th star
Three Enclosures (三垣)	天市垣	Tiān Shì Yuán	Heavenly Market enclosure	天市左垣	Tiānshìzuǒyuán	Left Wall	η Oph	Sabik (for component A)	宋	Sòng	(Star of) Song
Three Enclosures (三垣)	天市垣	Tiān Shì Yuán	Heavenly Market enclosure	天市左垣	Tiānshìzuǒyuán	Left Wall	η Oph	Sabik (for component A)	张宿西第二星	Zhāngsùxīdìèrxīng	2nd star in the west of Extended Net constellation
Three Enclosures (三垣)	天市垣	Tiān Shì Yuán	Heavenly Market enclosure	天市左垣	Tiānshìzuǒyuán	Left Wall	V841 Oph		宋增一	Sòngzēngyī	1st additional of Song
Three Enclosures (三垣)	天市垣	Tiān Shì Yuán	Heavenly Market enclosure	天市左垣	Tiānshìzuǒyuán	Left Wall	29 Oph		宋增二	Sòngzēngyī	2nd additional of Song
Three Enclosures (三垣)	天市垣	Tiān Shì Yuán	Heavenly Market enclosure	天市右垣	Tiānshìyòuyuán	Right Wall					
Three Enclosures (三垣)	天市垣	Tiān Shì Yuán	Heavenly Market enclosure	天市右垣	Tiānshìyòuyuán	Right Wall	δ Oph	Yed Prior			
Three Enclosures (三垣)	天市垣	Tiān Shì Yuán	Heavenly Market enclosure	天市右垣	Tiānshìyòuyuán	Right Wall	δ Oph	Yed Prior	天市右垣九	Tiānshìyòuyuánjiǔ	9th star
Three Enclosures (三垣)	天市垣	Tiān Shì Yuán	Heavenly Market enclosure	天市右垣	Tiānshìyòuyuán	Right Wall	δ Oph	Yed Prior	梁	Liáng	(Star of) Liang
Three Enclosures (三垣)	天市垣	Tiān Shì Yuán	Heavenly Market enclosure	天市右垣	Tiānshìyòuyuán	Right Wall	ε Oph	Yed Posterior			
Three Enclosures (三垣)	天市垣	Tiān Shì Yuán	Heavenly Market enclosure	天市右垣	Tiānshìyòuyuán	Right Wall	ε Oph	Yed Posterior	天市右垣十	Tiānshìyòuyuánshí	10th star
Three Enclosures (三垣)	天市垣	Tiān Shì Yuán	Heavenly Market enclosure	天市右垣	Tiānshìyòuyuán	Right Wall	ε Oph	Yed Posterior	楚	Chǔ	(Star of) Chu
Three Enclosures (三垣)	天市垣	Tiān Shì Yuán	Heavenly Market enclosure	天市右垣	Tiānshìyòuyuán	Right Wall	ζ Oph				
Three Enclosures (三垣)	天市垣	Tiān Shì Yuán	Heavenly Market enclosure	天市右垣	Tiānshìyòuyuán	Right Wall	ζ Oph		天市右垣十一	Tiānshìyòuyuánshíyī	11th star
Three Enclosures (三垣)	天市垣	Tiān Shì Yuán	Heavenly Market enclosure	天市右垣	Tiānshìyòuyuán	Right Wall	ζ Oph		韓	Hán	(Star of) Han
Three Enclosures (三垣)	天市垣	Tiān Shì Yuán	Heavenly Market enclosure	市樓	Shìlóu	Municipal Office					
Three Enclosures (三垣)	天市垣	Tiān Shì Yuán	Heavenly Market enclosure	市樓	Shìlóu	Municipal Office	μ Oph		市樓一	Shìlóuyī	1st star
Three Enclosures (三垣)	天市垣	Tiān Shì Yuán	Heavenly Market enclosure	市樓	Shìlóu	Municipal Office	τ Oph		市樓三	Shìlóusān	3rd star
Three Enclosures (三垣)	天市垣	Tiān Shì Yuán	Heavenly Market enclosure	市樓	Shìlóu	Municipal Office	HD 161056		市樓六	Shìlóuliù	6th star
Three Enclosures (三垣)	天市垣	Tiān Shì Yuán	Heavenly Market enclosure	車肆	Chēsì	Commodity Market					
Three Enclosures (三垣)	天市垣	Tiān Shì Yuán	Heavenly Market enclosure	車肆	Chēsì	Commodity Market	υ Oph		車肆一	Chēsìyī	1st star
Three Enclosures (三垣)	天市垣	Tiān Shì Yuán	Heavenly Market enclosure	車肆	Chēsì	Commodity Market	20 Oph		車肆二	Chēsìèr	2nd star
Three Enclosures (三垣)	天市垣	Tiān Shì Yuán	Heavenly Market enclosure	車肆	Chēsì	Commodity Market	23 Oph		車肆增一	Chēsìzēngyī	1st additional star
Three Enclosures (三垣)	天市垣	Tiān Shì Yuán	Heavenly Market enclosure	車肆	Chēsì	Commodity Market	30 Oph		車肆增二	Chēsìzēngèr	2nd additional star
Three Enclosures (三垣)	天市垣	Tiān Shì Yuán	Heavenly Market enclosure	宗正	Zōngzhèng	Official for Royal Clan					
Three Enclosures (三垣)	天市垣	Tiān Shì Yuán	Heavenly Market enclosure	宗正	Zōngzhèng	Official for Royal Clan	β Oph	Cebalrai			
Three Enclosures (三垣)	天市垣	Tiān Shì Yuán	Heavenly Market enclosure	宗正	Zōngzhèng	Official for Royal Clan	β Oph	Cebalrai	宗正一	Zōngzhèngyī	1st star
Three Enclosures (三垣)	天市垣	Tiān Shì Yuán	Heavenly Market enclosure	宗正	Zōngzhèng	Official for Royal Clan	β Oph	Cebalrai	宗正西星	Zōngzhèngxīxīng	Western star
Three Enclosures (三垣)	天市垣	Tiān Shì Yuán	Heavenly Market enclosure	宗正	Zōngzhèng	Official for Royal Clan	β Oph	Cebalrai	内平	Nèipíng	High judge
Three Enclosures (三垣)	天市垣	Tiān Shì Yuán	Heavenly Market enclosure	宗正	Zōngzhèng	Official for Royal Clan	γ Oph	Bake-eo	宗正二	Zōngzhèngèr	2nd star
Three Enclosures (三垣)	天市垣	Tiān Shì Yuán	Heavenly Market enclosure	宗正	Zōngzhèng	Official for Royal Clan	61 Oph		宗正增一	Zōngzhèngzēngyī	1st additional star
Three Enclosures (三垣)	天市垣	Tiān Shì Yuán	Heavenly Market enclosure	宗正	Zōngzhèng	Official for Royal Clan	σ Oph		宗正增二	Zōngzhèngzēngèr	2nd additional star
Three Enclosures (三垣)	天市垣	Tiān Shì Yuán	Heavenly Market enclosure	宗正	Zōngzhèng	Official for Royal Clan	41 Oph		宗正增三	Zōngzhèngzēngsān	3rd additional star
Three Enclosures (三垣)	天市垣	Tiān Shì Yuán	Heavenly Market enclosure	宗人	Zōngrén	Official of Religious Ceremonies					
Three Enclosures (三垣)	天市垣	Tiān Shì Yuán	Heavenly Market enclosure	宗人	Zōngrén	Official of Religious Ceremonies	66 Oph		宗人一	Zōngrényī	1st star
Three Enclosures (三垣)	天市垣	Tiān Shì Yuán	Heavenly Market enclosure	宗人	Zōngrén	Official of Religious Ceremonies	67 Oph		宗人二	Zōngrénèr	2nd star
Three Enclosures (三垣)	天市垣	Tiān Shì Yuán	Heavenly Market enclosure	宗人	Zōngrén	Official of Religious Ceremonies	68 Oph		宗人三	Zōngrénsān	3rd star
Three Enclosures (三垣)	天市垣	Tiān Shì Yuán	Heavenly Market enclosure	宗人	Zōngrén	Official of Religious Ceremonies	70 Oph		宗人四	Zōngrénsì	4th star
Three Enclosures (三垣)	天市垣	Tiān Shì Yuán	Heavenly Market enclosure	宗人	Zōngrén	Official of Religious Ceremonies	72 Oph		宗人增一	Zōngrénzēngyī	1st additional star
Three Enclosures (三垣)	天市垣	Tiān Shì Yuán	Heavenly Market enclosure	宗人	Zōngrén	Official of Religious Ceremonies	71 Oph		宗人增二	Zōngrénzēngèr	2nd additional star
Three Enclosures (三垣)	天市垣	Tiān Shì Yuán	Heavenly Market enclosure	宗人	Zōngrén	Official of Religious Ceremonies	73 Oph		宗人增三	Zōngrénzēngsān	3rd additional star
Three Enclosures (三垣)	天市垣	Tiān Shì Yuán	Heavenly Market enclosure	宗人	Zōngrén	Official of Religious Ceremonies	74 Oph		宗人增四	Zōngrénzēngsì	4th additional star
Three Enclosures (三垣)	天市垣	Tiān Shì Yuán	Heavenly Market enclosure	候	Hòu	Astrologer					
Three Enclosures (三垣)	天市垣	Tiān Shì Yuán	Heavenly Market enclosure	候	Hòu	Astrologer	α Oph	Rasalhague			
Three Enclosures (三垣)	天市垣	Tiān Shì Yuán	Heavenly Market enclosure	候	Hòu	Astrologer	α Oph	Rasalhague	候	Hòu	(One star of)
Three Enclosures (三垣)	天市垣	Tiān Shì Yuán	Heavenly Market enclosure	候	Hòu	Astrologer	α Oph	Rasalhague	候星	Hòuxīng	Star of astrologer (prince)
Three Enclosures (三垣)	天市垣	Tiān Shì Yuán	Heavenly Market enclosure	候	Hòu	Astrologer	54 Oph		候增三	Hòuzēngsān	3rd additional star
Three Enclosures (三垣)	天市垣	Tiān Shì Yuán	Heavenly Market enclosure	候	Hòu	Astrologer	56 Oph		候增四	Hòuzēngsì	4th additional star
Three Enclosures (三垣)	天市垣	Tiān Shì Yuán	Heavenly Market enclosure	候	Hòu	Astrologer	53 Oph		候增五	Hòuzēngwǔ	5th additional star
Three Enclosures (三垣)	天市垣	Tiān Shì Yuán	Heavenly Market enclosure	宦者	Huànzhě	Eunuch Official					
Three Enclosures (三垣)	天市垣	Tiān Shì Yuán	Heavenly Market enclosure	宦者	Huànzhě	Eunuch Official	32 Oph		宦者一	Huànzhěyī	1st star
Three Enclosures (三垣)	天市垣	Tiān Shì Yuán	Heavenly Market enclosure	宦者	Huànzhě	Eunuch Official	37 Oph		宦者四	Huànzhěsì	4th star
Three Enclosures (三垣)	天市垣	Tiān Shì Yuán	Heavenly Market enclosure	宦者	Huànzhě	Eunuch Official	HD 156681		宦者增五	Huànzhězēngwǔ	5th additional star
Three Enclosures (三垣)	天市垣	Tiān Shì Yuán	Heavenly Market enclosure	列肆	Lièsì	Jewel Market					
Three Enclosures (三垣)	天市垣	Tiān Shì Yuán	Heavenly Market enclosure	列肆	Lièsì	Jewel Market	λ Oph	Marfik	列肆二	Lièsìèr	2nd star
Three Enclosures (三垣)	天市垣	Tiān Shì Yuán	Heavenly Market enclosure	列肆	Lièsì	Jewel Market	21 Oph		列肆增一	Lièsìzēngyī	1st additional star
Three Enclosures (三垣)	天市垣	Tiān Shì Yuán	Heavenly Market enclosure	列肆	Lièsì	Jewel Market	16 Oph		列肆增二	Lièsìzēngèr	2nd additional star
Three Enclosures (三垣)	天市垣	Tiān Shì Yuán	Heavenly Market enclosure	列肆	Lièsì	Jewel Market	14 Oph		列肆增三	Lièsìzēngsān	3rd additional star
Three Enclosures (三垣)	天市垣	Tiān Shì Yuán	Heavenly Market enclosure	列肆	Lièsì	Jewel Market	12 Oph		列肆增四	Lièsìzēngsì	4th additional star
Three Enclosures (三垣)	天市垣	Tiān Shì Yuán	Heavenly Market enclosure	斛	Hú	Dipper for Solid					
Three Enclosures (三垣)	天市垣	Tiān Shì Yuán	Heavenly Market enclosure	斛	Hú	Dipper for Solid	ι Oph		斛一	Huyī	1st star
Three Enclosures (三垣)	天市垣	Tiān Shì Yuán	Heavenly Market enclosure	斛	Hú	Dipper for Solid	κ Oph		斛二	Huèr	2nd star
Azure Dragon of the East (東方青龍)	房	Fáng	Room	東咸	Dōngxián	Eastern Door					
Azure Dragon of the East (東方青龍)	房	Fáng	Room	東咸	Dōngxián	Eastern Door	φ Oph		東咸一	Dōngxiányī	1st star
Azure Dragon of the East (東方青龍)	房	Fáng	Room	東咸	Dōngxián	Eastern Door	χ Oph		東咸二	Dōngxiánèr	2nd star
Azure Dragon of the East (東方青龍)	房	Fáng	Room	東咸	Dōngxián	Eastern Door	ψ Oph		東咸三	Dōngxiánsān	3rd star
Azure Dragon of the East (東方青龍)	房	Fáng	Room	東咸	Dōngxián	Eastern Door	ω Oph		東咸四	Dōngxiánsì	4th star
Azure Dragon of the East (東方青龍)	房	Fáng	Room	東咸	Dōngxián	Eastern Door	24 Sco		東咸增一	Dōngxiánzēngyī	1st additional star
Azure Dragon of the East (東方青龍)	心	Xīn	Heart	心	Xīn	Heart					
Azure Dragon of the East (東方青龍)	心	Xīn	Heart	心	Xīn	Heart	ρ Oph		心宿增四	Xīnsùzēngsì	4th additional star
Azure Dragon of the East (東方青龍)	心	Xīn	Heart	心	Xīn	Heart	15 Oph		心宿增六	Xīnsùzēngliù	6th additional star
Azure Dragon of the East (東方青龍)	心	Xīn	Heart	心	Xīn	Heart	18 Oph		心宿增七	Xīnsùzēngqī	7th additional star
Azure Dragon of the East (東方青龍)	尾	Wěi	Tail	天江	Tiānjiāng	Celestial River					
Azure Dragon of the East (東方青龍)	尾	Wěi	Tail	天江	Tiānjiāng	Celestial River	HD 155401		天江一	Tiānjiāngyī	1st star
Azure Dragon of the East (東方青龍)	尾	Wěi	Tail	天江	Tiānjiāng	Celestial River	36 Oph A	Guniibuu (for component A)	天二	Tiānjiāngèr	2nd star
Azure Dragon of the East (東方青龍)	尾	Wěi	Tail	天江	Tiānjiāng	Celestial River	θ Oph				
Azure Dragon of the East (東方青龍)	尾	Wěi	Tail	天江	Tiānjiāng	Celestial River	θ Oph		天江三	Tiānjiāngsān	3rd star
Azure Dragon of the East (東方青龍)	尾	Wěi	Tail	天江	Tiānjiāng	Celestial River	θ Oph		天江东第三星	Tiānjiāngdōngdìsānxīng	Eastern and 3rd rank star
Azure Dragon of the East (東方青龍)	尾	Wěi	Tail	天江	Tiānjiāng	Celestial River	44 Oph		天江四	Tiānjiāngsì	4th star
Azure Dragon of the East (東方青龍)	尾	Wěi	Tail	天江	Tiānjiāng	Celestial River	43 Oph		天江增一	Tiānjiāngzēngyī	1st additional star
Azure Dragon of the East (東方青龍)	尾	Wěi	Tail	天江	Tiānjiāng	Celestial River	38 Oph		天江增二	Tiānjiāngzēngèr	2nd additional star
Azure Dragon of the East (東方青龍)	尾	Wěi	Tail	天江	Tiānjiāng	Celestial River	36 Oph C		天江增三	Tiānjiāngzēngsān	3rd additional star
Azure Dragon of the East (東方青龍)	尾	Wěi	Tail	天江	Tiānjiāng	Celestial River	HD 156992		天江增四	Tiānjiāngzēngsì	4th additional star
Azure Dragon of the East (東方青龍)	尾	Wěi	Tail	天江	Tiānjiāng	Celestial River	191 Oph		天江增五	Tiānjiāngzēngwǔ	5th additional star
Azure Dragon of the East (東方青龍)	尾	Wěi	Tail	天江	Tiānjiāng	Celestial River	ο Oph		天江增六	Tiānjiāngzēngliù	6th additional star
Azure Dragon of the East (東方青龍)	尾	Wěi	Tail	天江	Tiānjiāng	Celestial River	ξ Oph		天江增七	Tiānjiāngzēngqī	7th additional star
Azure Dragon of the East (東方青龍)	尾	Wěi	Tail	天江	Tiānjiāng	Celestial River	HD 154418		天江增八	Tiānjiāngzēngbā	8th additional star
Azure Dragon of the East (東方青龍)	尾	Wěi	Tail	天江	Tiānjiāng	Celestial River	26 Oph		天江增九	Tiānjiāngzēngjiǔ	9th additional star
Azure Dragon of the East (東方青龍)	尾	Wěi	Tail	天江	Tiānjiāng	Celestial River	28 Oph		天江增十	Tiānjiāngzēngshí	10th additional star
Azure Dragon of the East (東方青龍)	尾	Wěi	Tail	天江	Tiānjiāng	Celestial River	31 Oph C		天江增十一	Tiānjiāngzēngshíyī	11th additional star
Azure Dragon of the East (東方青龍)	箕	Jī	Winnowing Basket	糠	Kāng	Chaff					
Azure Dragon of the East (東方青龍)	箕	Jī	Winnowing Basket	糠	Kāng	Chaff	45 Oph		糠	Kāng	(One star of)
Azure Dragon of the East (東方青龍)	箕	Jī	Winnowing Basket	糠	Kāng	Chaff	HD 157955		糠增一	Kāngzēngyī	1st additional star
Black Tortoise of the North (北方玄武)	斗	Dǒu	Dipper	天籥	Tiānyuè	Celestial Keyhole					
Black Tortoise of the North (北方玄武)	斗	Dǒu	Dipper	天籥	Tiānyuè	Celestial Keyhole	58 Oph		天籥三	Tiānyuèsān	3rd star
Black Tortoise of the North (北方玄武)	斗	Dǒu	Dipper	天籥	Tiānyuè	Celestial Keyhole	HD 160042		天籥四	Tiānyuèsì	4th star
Black Tortoise of the North (北方玄武)	斗	Dǒu	Dipper	天籥	Tiānyuè	Celestial Keyhole	52 Oph		天籥五	Tiānyuèwǔ	5th star
Black Tortoise of the North (北方玄武)	斗	Dǒu	Dipper	天籥	Tiānyuè	Celestial Keyhole	51 Oph		天籥六	Tiānyuèliù	6th star
Black Tortoise of the North (北方玄武)	斗	Dǒu	Dipper	天籥	Tiānyuè	Celestial Keyhole	HD 158704		天籥七	Tiānyuèqī	7th star
Black Tortoise of the North (北方玄武)	斗	Dǒu	Dipper	天籥	Tiānyuè	Celestial Keyhole	50 Oph		天龠增一	Tiānyuèzēngyī	1st additional star

== See also ==
- Traditional Chinese star names
- Chinese constellations
