= List of stars in Ophiuchus =

This is the list of notable stars in the constellation Ophiuchus, sorted by decreasing brightness.

Name	B	F	G.	Var	HD	HIP	RA	Dec	vis. mag.	abs. mag.	Dist. (ly)	Sp. class	Notes
α Oph	α	55			159561	86032	17^{h} 34^{m} 56.00^{s}	+12° 33′ 38.1″	2.08	1.30	47	A5III	Ras Alhague, Rasalhague
η Oph	η	35	90		155125	84012	17^{h} 10^{m} 22.66^{s}	−15° 43′ 30.5″	2.43	0.37	84	A2.5Va	Sabik
ζ Oph	ζ	13	28		149757	81377	16^{h} 37^{m} 09.53^{s}	−10° 34′ 01.7″	2.54	−3.20	458	O9.5V	Han; γ Cas variable; Be star
δ Oph	δ	1	7		146051	79593	16^{h} 14^{m} 20.77^{s}	−03° 41′ 38.3″	2.73	−0.86	170	M1III	Yed Prior, Yad, Jed Prior
β Oph	β	60	168		161096	86742	17^{h} 43^{m} 28.38^{s}	+04° 34′ 00.9″	2.76	0.76	82	K2III	Cebalrai, Celbalrai, Celb-al-Rai, Kelb Alrai, Cheleb
κ Oph	κ	27	65		153210	83000	16^{h} 57^{m} 40.27^{s}	+09° 22′ 30.2″	3.19	1.09	86	K2IIIvar	
ε Oph	ε	2	9		146791	79882	16^{h} 18^{m} 19.24^{s}	−04° 41′ 33.4″	3.23	0.64	107	G8III	Yed Posterior, Yad, Jed Posterior
θ Oph	θ	42	126		157056	84970	17^{h} 22^{m} 00.58^{s}	−24° 59′ 58.2″	3.27	−2.92	563	B2IV	β Cep variable
ν Oph	ν	64	186		163917	88048	17^{h} 59^{m} 01.60^{s}	−09° 46′ 24.1″	3.32	−0.03	153	K0III	Sinistra; has two brown dwarfs
72 Oph	s^{2}	72	199		165777	88771	18^{h} 07^{m} 21.02^{s}	+09° 33′ 49.2″	3.71	1.69	83	A4IVs	
γ Oph	γ	62	172		161868	87108	17^{h} 47^{m} 53.57^{s}	+02° 42′ 26.9″	3.75	1.43	95	A0V	Bake-eo / Bake Eo, Tsung Ching, Muliphen
λ Oph	λ	10	25		148857	80883	16^{h} 30^{m} 54.84^{s}	+01° 59′ 02.8″	3.82	0.28	166	A2V	Marfik, Marfic, Marsic
67 Oph	o	67	191		164353	88192	18^{h} 00^{m} 38.72^{s}	+02° 55′ 53.7″	3.93	−4.26	1417	B5Ib	
70 Oph	p	70	197		165341	88601	18^{h} 05^{m} 27.21^{s}	+02° 30′ 08.8″	4.03	5.50	17	K0V SB	nearby
44 Oph	b	44	135		157792	85340	17^{h} 26^{m} 22.22^{s}	−24° 10′ 30.1″	4.16	2.11	84	A3IV:m	
χ Oph	χ	7	15		148184	80569	16^{h} 27^{m} 01.44^{s}	−18° 27′ 22.3″	4.22	−1.66	489	B2Vne	γ Cas variable
45 Oph	d	45	139		157919	85423	17^{h} 27^{m} 21.26^{s}	−29° 52′ 00.1″	4.28	1.61	111	F3III	θ Tel
φ Oph	φ	8	24		148786	80894	16^{h} 31^{m} 08.39^{s}	−16° 36′ 45.5″	4.29	0.25	210	G8/K0III	
36 Oph B	A	36	103		155885	84405	17^{h} 15^{m} 21.29^{s}	−26° 36′ 00.2″	4.33	5.44	20	K1V	nearby triple star system
σ Oph	σ	49	143		157999	85355	17^{h} 26^{m} 30.88^{s}	+04° 08′ 25.2″	4.34	−3.44	1173	K3IIvar	
ι Oph	ι	25			152614	82673	16^{h} 54^{m} 00.50^{s}	+10° 09′ 55.6″	4.39	0.11	234	B8V	
ξ Oph	ξ	40	124		156897	84893	17^{h} 21^{m} 00.21^{s}	−21° 06′ 44.8″	4.39	3.19	57	F2/F3V	
68 Oph	k	68	193		164577	88290	18^{h} 01^{m} 45.19^{s}	+01° 18′ 18.4″	4.42	−0.13	265	A2Vn	
ω Oph	ω	9	26		148898	80975	16^{h} 32^{m} 08.19^{s}	−21° 27′ 59.3″	4.45	0.80	175	Ap	α² CVn variable
ψ Oph	ψ	4	11		147700	80343	16^{h} 24^{m} 06.20^{s}	−20° 02′ 14.0″	4.48	0.79	178	K0III	
47 Oph		47	141		157950	85365	17^{h} 26^{m} 37.94^{s}	−05° 05′ 11.4″	4.53	2.14	98	F3V	
ρ Oph A	ρ	5	13		147933	80473	16^{h} 25^{m} 35.12^{s}	−23° 26′ 49.6″	4.57	−0.84	361	B2V	
μ Oph	μ	57	157		159975	86284	17^{h} 37^{m} 50.72^{s}	−08° 07′ 07.4″	4.58	−1.55	549	B8II-IIIMNp	
υ Oph	υ	3	18		148367	80628	16^{h} 27^{m} 48.23^{s}	−08° 22′ 18.1″	4.62	1.75	122	A3m	
20 Oph		20	49		151769	82369	16^{h} 49^{m} 49.97^{s}	−10° 46′ 58.1″	4.64	1.80	121	F7IV	
71 Oph	s^{1}	71	198		165760	88765	18^{h} 07^{m} 18.35^{s}	+08° 44′ 01.7″	4.64	0.33	238	G8III-IV	
41 Oph		41	111		156266	84514	17^{h} 16^{m} 36.71^{s}	−00° 26′ 42.5″	4.72	0.60	218	K2III	
τ Oph B	τ	69			164764	88404	18^{h} 03^{m} 04.91^{s}	−08° 10′ 48.9″	4.77	1.19	167	F5V	
51 Oph	c	51	149		158643	85755	17^{h} 31^{m} 24.95^{s}	−23° 57′ 45.3″	4.78	−0.80	426	A0V	has a developing planetary system
66 Oph		66	190	V2048	164284	88149	18^{h} 00^{m} 15.80^{s}	+04° 22′ 07.1″	4.79	−1.79	676	B2Ve	V2048 Oph; γ Cas variable; Be star
30 Oph		30	70		153687	83262	17^{h} 01^{m} 03.63^{s}	−04° 13′ 20.8″	4.82	−0.63	402	K4III	
74 Oph	r	74	209		168656	89918	18^{h} 20^{m} 52.06^{s}	+03° 22′ 37.7″	4.85	0.27	269	G8III	
58 Oph		58	165		160915	86736	17^{h} 43^{m} 25.85^{s}	−21° 40′ 59.1″	4.86	3.64	57	F6/F7V	
24 Sco		(24)	39		150416	81724	16^{h} 41^{m} 34.40^{s}	−17° 44′ 31.8″	4.91	−0.48	391	G8II/III	
66 Her	e	(66)			156681	84671	17^{h} 18^{m} 36.99^{s}	+10° 51′ 53.0″	5.03	−1.60	691	K4II-III	
36 Oph A	A	36	103		155886		17^{h} 15^{m} 20.80^{s}	−26° 36′ 05.0″	5.07		20	K0V	Guniibuu, component of the 36 Oph system
ο Oph A	ο	39	112		156349	84626	17^{h} 18^{m} 00.72^{s}	−24° 17′ 12.8″	5.14	−0.09	363	K:...	part of the ο Oph system
23 Oph		23	58		152601	82730	16^{h} 54^{m} 35.71^{s}	−06° 09′ 14.1″	5.23	0.82	248	K2III	
17 G. Oph			17	V2105	148349	80620	16^{h} 27^{m} 43.46^{s}	−07° 35′ 51.2″	5.24	−0.72	507	M2 comp	
τ Oph A	τ	69	195		164765	88404	18^{h} 03^{m} 04.90^{s}	−08° 10′ 50.0″	5.24		167	F2V	
43 Oph		43	128		157236	85084	17^{h} 23^{m} 21.59^{s}	−28° 08′ 33.9″	5.30	−1.02	599	K4/K5III	
Gliese 678			150		158614	85667	17^{h} 30^{m} 23.87^{s}	−01° 03′ 45.0″	5.31	4.23	54	G8IV-V	
37 Oph		37			155644	84177	17^{h} 12^{m} 27.81^{s}	+10° 35′ 06.8″	5.32	−1.56	776	M2III	
HD 171802	(e)		(52 Cau)		171802	91217	18^{h} 36^{m} 27.84^{s}	+09° 07′ 22.1″	5.38	2.43	127	F5III	52 G. Ser Cau in Ophiuchus
21 G. Oph			21		148513	80693	16^{h} 28^{m} 33.98^{s}	+00° 39′ 54.6″	5.41	−0.15	422	K4IIIp	
146 G. Oph			146		158352	85537	17^{h} 28^{m} 49.69^{s}	+00° 19′ 50.1″	5.41	1.41	206	A8V	
208 G. Oph	(c)		208		168387	89772	18^{h} 19^{m} 09.56^{s}	+07° 15′ 35.1″	5.41	2.15	147	K2III	
88 G. Oph			88		155078	83962	17^{h} 09^{m} 47.92^{s}	−10° 31′ 22.9″	5.43	2.40	132	F5IV	
HD 171834	(x)		(53 Cau)		171834	91237	18^{h} 36^{m} 39.09^{s}	+06° 40′ 19.8″	5.43	2.92	103	F3V	53 G. Ser Cau in Ophiuchus
183 G. Oph			183		163532	87847	17^{h} 56^{m} 47.75^{s}	−04° 04′ 54.5″	5.44	−0.14	426	G9III	
202 G. Oph	(b)		202		166460	89065	18^{h} 10^{m} 40.29^{s}	+03° 19′ 27.4″	5.50	−0.01	412	K2III	
21 Oph		21	52		152127	82480	16^{h} 51^{m} 24.94^{s}	+01° 12′ 57.5″	5.51	0.39	345	A2Vs	
40 G. Oph			40		150453	81754	16^{h} 41^{m} 53.67^{s}	−19° 55′ 28.1″	5.55	2.41	139	F3V	
24 Oph		24	61		152849	82925	16^{h} 56^{m} 48.04^{s}	−23° 09′ 01.2″	5.57	0.34	363	A0V	
152 G. Oph			152		158837	85749	17^{h} 31^{m} 21.35^{s}	+02° 43′ 28.1″	5.57	0.28	373	G8III	
153 G. Oph			153		159170	85922	17^{h} 33^{m} 29.87^{s}	−05° 44′ 40.5″	5.61	2.19	158	A5V	
82 G. Oph			82		154445	83635	17^{h} 05^{m} 32.26^{s}	−00° 53′ 31.4″	5.63	−1.22	765	B1V	
HR 6902			(39 Cau)		169689	90313	18^{h} 25^{m} 38.80^{s}	+08° 01′ 55.3″	5.64	−1.33	807	G8III-IV+..	39 G. Ser Cau in Ophiuchus
22 G. Oph			22		148604	80793	16^{h} 29^{m} 46.90^{s}	−14° 33′ 03.2″	5.66	1.09	268	G5III/IV	
201 G. Oph	(a)		201		166285	89000	18^{h} 09^{m} 54.01^{s}	+03° 07′ 13.1″	5.67	2.31	153	F5V	
73 Oph	q	73	200	V2666	166233	88964	18^{h} 09^{m} 33.86^{s}	+03° 59′ 35.8″	5.71	2.17	166	F2V	V2666 Oph; γ Dor variable
14 Oph		14	43		150557	81734	16^{h} 41^{m} 42.54^{s}	+01° 10′ 52.0″	5.74	2.21	165	F2.7III-IV	
26 Oph		26	67		153363	83196	17^{h} 00^{m} 09.48^{s}	−24° 59′ 20.2″	5.74	3.13	108	F3V	
12 Oph		12	27	V2133	149661	81300	16^{h} 36^{m} 21.18^{s}	−02° 19′ 25.8″	5.77	5.82	32	K2V	V2133 Oph; BY Dra variable
134 G. Oph			134		157617	85139	17^{h} 23^{m} 57.61^{s}	+08° 51′ 09.3″	5.77	−1.82	1076	K1III	
180 G. Oph			180		162917	87558	17^{h} 53^{m} 14.26^{s}	+06° 06′ 04.5″	5.77	3.29	102	F4IV-V	
53 Oph	f	53	155		159480	85998	17^{h} 34^{m} 36.69^{s}	+09° 35′ 12.2″	5.80	0.70	342	A2V	
132 G. Oph			132		157527	85207	17^{h} 24^{m} 42.04^{s}	−21° 26′ 29.1″	5.82	0.99	302	K0III	
V2052 Oph			182	V2052	163472	87812	17^{h} 56^{m} 18.40^{s}	+00° 40′ 13.3″	5.82	−1.21	830	B2IV-V	β Cep variable
54 G. Oph			54		152311	82621	16^{h} 53^{m} 25.26^{s}	−20° 24′ 55.8″	5.86	3.63	91	G5IV	
187 G. Oph			187		164064	88101	17^{h} 59^{m} 36.76^{s}	−04° 49′ 15.3″	5.86	−0.29	553	K5III	
66 G. Oph			66		153336	83176	16^{h} 59^{m} 57.70^{s}	−25° 05′ 31.8″	5.88	0.03	482	M1/M2III	
U Oph			110	U	156247	84500	17^{h} 16^{m} 31.72^{s}	+01° 12′ 38.1″	5.89	−0.46	606	B5Vnn	Algol variable
179 G. Oph			179		162774	87491	17^{h} 52^{m} 35.46^{s}	+01° 18′ 18.2″	5.91	0.75	351	K5III	
ρ Oph B	ρ	5	12		147934	80473	16^{h} 25^{m} 35.10^{s}	−23° 26′ 46.0″	5.92		361	B2V	
184 G. Oph			184		163624	87875	17^{h} 57^{m} 04.30^{s}	+00° 04′ 00.1″	5.95	1.05	312	A3V	
164 G. Oph			164		160781	86575	17^{h} 41^{m} 32.32^{s}	+06° 18′ 47.4″	5.97	−1.93	1240	G7III	
85 G. Oph			85		154779	83854	17^{h} 08^{m} 14.85^{s}	−17° 36′ 32.3″	5.98	0.53	401	K0III	
105 G. Oph			105		155970	84402	17^{h} 15^{m} 20.30^{s}	−14° 35′ 02.9″	5.98	1.11	307	K1III	
140 G. Oph			140		157955	85442	17^{h} 27^{m} 37.56^{s}	−29° 43′ 28.2″	5.98	−0.34	599	B9.5IV	
					169111	90052	18^{h} 22^{m} 35.31^{s}	+12° 01′ 46.7″	5.99	0.16	479	A2V	
V2213 Oph			81	V2213	154417	83601	17^{h} 05^{m} 16.83^{s}	+00° 42′ 12.1″	6.00	4.45	66	F9V	BY Draconis variable
142 G. Oph			142		157978	85333	17^{h} 26^{m} 19.01^{s}	+07° 35′ 44.4″	6.01	−1.01	825	A0...	
16 Oph		16	44		151133	82037	16^{h} 45^{m} 29.68^{s}	+01° 01′ 12.5″	6.02	0.20	477	B9.5III	
46 G. Oph			46		151527	82259	16^{h} 48^{m} 26.99^{s}	−14° 54′ 33.8″	6.03	0.35	447	A0IV/V	
119 G. Oph			119		156717	84792	17^{h} 19^{m} 53.35^{s}	−17° 45′ 23.3″	6.03	0.74	373	A0V	
30 G. Oph			30		149911	81440	16^{h} 38^{m} 01.56^{s}	−06° 32′ 16.8″	6.05	0.54	412	A0pe...	
151 G. Oph			151		158704	85783	17^{h} 31^{m} 44.38^{s}	−26° 16′ 10.8″	6.05	0.42	436	B9II/III	
16 G. Oph			16		148287	80558	16^{h} 26^{m} 50.06^{s}	+02° 20′ 52.7″	6.06	0.28	466	G8III	
86 G. Oph			86		154895	83853	17^{h} 08^{m} 13.66^{s}	−01° 04′ 45.8″	6.06	1.46	272	A3V	
36 G. Oph			36		150366	81728	16^{h} 41^{m} 36.21^{s}	−24° 28′ 04.6″	6.07	1.54	262	A7III	
19 Oph		19	45		151431	82162	16^{h} 47^{m} 09.76^{s}	+02° 03′ 52.4″	6.07	0.17	492	A3V	
			(43 Cau)		170137	90487	18^{h} 27^{m} 50.32^{s}	+03° 44′ 54.9″	6.07	−2.05	1370	K3III	43 G. Ser Cau in Ophiuchus
109 G. Oph			109		156227	84524	17^{h} 16^{m} 42.75^{s}	−06° 14′ 41.8″	6.08	0.60	407	K0	
162 G. Oph			162		160471	86476	17^{h} 40^{m} 11.95^{s}	−02° 09′ 08.2″	6.08	−0.03	544	K2.5Ib	
V2392 Oph			206	V2392	167654	89527	18^{h} 16^{m} 05.58^{s}	+02° 22′ 39.3″	6.10	−0.58	706	M4III	
95 G. Oph			95		155401	84175	17^{h} 12^{m} 25.07^{s}	−27° 45′ 43.2″	6.12	0.00	546	B9Vn...	
					160365	86373	17^{h} 38^{m} 57.87^{s}	+13° 19′ 45.0″	6.12	1.26	305	F6III	
V986 Oph			196	V986	165174	88522	18^{h} 04^{m} 37.36^{s}	+01° 55′ 08.4″	6.14			B0IIIn	
63 G. Oph			63		153021	82979	16^{h} 57^{m} 26.00^{s}	−10° 57′ 47.4″	6.15	1.72	251	G8III-IV	
61 Oph		61	169		161270	86831	17^{h} 44^{m} 34.09^{s}	+02° 34′ 45.9″	6.16	0.41	460	A1IV-V	
V2368 Oph			108	V2368	156208	84479	17^{h} 16^{m} 14.25^{s}	+02° 11′ 10.5″	6.17	−0.11	588	A2V	Algol variable
33 Sco		(33)			157588	85242	17^{h} 25^{m} 06.23^{s}	−24° 14′ 37.4″	6.17	0.60	424	K0III	
8 G. Oph			8		146514	79781	16^{h} 16^{m} 55.28^{s}	−03° 57′ 12.1″	6.18	2.79	155	A9Vn	
V1010 Oph			48	V1010	151676	82339	16^{h} 49^{m} 27.67^{s}	−15° 40′ 04.8″	6.18	1.83	242	A3V	β Lyr variable
Y Oph			175	Y	162714	87495	17^{h} 52^{m} 38.70^{s}	−06° 08′ 36.8″	6.18	−3.54	2860	G3Ibv SB	δ Cep variable
2 Sgr		(2)	158		160042	86352	17^{h} 38^{m} 44.87^{s}	−21° 54′ 45.4″	6.19	1.11	337	G6III/IV	
					162468	87335	17^{h} 50^{m} 43.61^{s}	+11° 56′ 47.9″	6.19	0.22	509	K1III-IV	
173 G. Oph			173		161941	87150	17^{h} 48^{m} 20.23^{s}	+03° 48′ 15.1″	6.22	−3.18	2470	B9.5V	
10 G. Oph			10		147550	80227	16^{h} 22^{m} 38.91^{s}	−02° 04′ 47.5″	6.24	0.76	407	B9V	
V2388 Oph				V2388	163151	87655	17^{h} 54^{m} 14.21^{s}	+11° 07′ 51.4″	6.24	2.08	221	F5Vn	
34 G. Oph			34		150259	81632	16^{h} 40^{m} 34.51^{s}	−20° 24′ 31.4″	6.25	0.68	424	K0III	
41 G. Oph			41		150451	81687	16^{h} 41^{m} 11.53^{s}	−01° 00′ 01.0″	6.25	2.88	154	A7III	
V2542 Oph			56	V2542	152569	82693	16^{h} 54^{m} 10.60^{s}	−01° 36′ 43.6″	6.25	1.93	238	F0V	δ Sct variable
159 G. Oph			159		160315	86391	17^{h} 39^{m} 08.48^{s}	+02° 01′ 41.2″	6.25	0.88	387	F4IV...	
5 G. Oph			5		145788	79463	16^{h} 12^{m} 56.60^{s}	−04° 13′ 14.7″	6.26	0.10	557	A1V	
80 G. Oph			80		154481	83740	17^{h} 06^{m} 53.23^{s}	−26° 30′ 46.8″	6.26	−1.73	1294	B8/B9II	
			(64 Cau)		172424	91523	18^{h} 39^{m} 51.60^{s}	+07° 21′ 31.4″	6.26	0.38	488	G8III	64 G. Ser Cau in Ophiuchus
62 G. Oph			62		152909	82951	16^{h} 57^{m} 03.99^{s}	−19° 32′ 23.4″	6.27	−0.33	682	B7/8III	
29 Oph		29	71		153727	83331	17^{h} 01^{m} 51.27^{s}	−18° 53′ 07.8″	6.28	0.58	450	K1III	
115 G. Oph			115		156462	84649	17^{h} 18^{m} 19.27^{s}	−16° 18′ 42.8″	6.28	−0.68	805	M0/M1III	
131 G. Oph			131		157347	85042	17^{h} 22^{m} 51.26^{s}	−02° 23′ 16.5″	6.28	4.83	63	G5IV	
185 G. Oph			185		163641	87866	17^{h} 56^{m} 55.96^{s}	+06° 29′ 15.8″	6.28	−0.32	681	B9III	
77 G. Oph			77		154204	83567	17^{h} 04^{m} 45.33^{s}	−20° 29′ 40.7″	6.29	0.86	397	B7IV/V	
28 Sco		(28)	79		154418	83684	17^{h} 06^{m} 11.81^{s}	−21° 33′ 51.8″	6.29	1.33	321	A1m...	
					168199	89677	18^{h} 18^{m} 02.94^{s}	+13° 46′ 37.4″	6.29	−1.38	1113	B5V	
167 G. Oph			167		161056	86768	17^{h} 43^{m} 47.02^{s}	−07° 04′ 46.5″	6.30	−1.85	1393	B1.5V	
122 G. Oph			122		156826	84801	17^{h} 19^{m} 59.53^{s}	−05° 55′ 01.3″	6.31	2.67	174	G9V	
51 G. Oph			51		151900	82405	16^{h} 50^{m} 22.25^{s}	−02° 39′ 15.3″	6.32	2.43	195	F1III-IV	
33 G. Oph			33		150177	81580	16^{h} 39^{m} 39.12^{s}	−09° 33′ 15.2″	6.33	3.14	142	F3V	
60 G. Oph			60		152781	82861	16^{h} 56^{m} 01.79^{s}	−16° 48′ 22.8″	6.33	3.30	132	K0/K1III/IV	
72 G. Oph			72		153914	83342	17^{h} 01^{m} 58.96^{s}	+08° 27′ 02.4″	6.33	1.00	379	A4V	
36 Oph C	A	36	106	V2215	156026	84478	17^{h} 16^{m} 13.68^{s}	−26° 32′ 36.3″	6.33	7.45	20	K5V	V2215 Oph; component of the 36 Oph system; RS CVn variable
176 G. Oph			176		162596	87428	17^{h} 51^{m} 59.45^{s}	−01° 14′ 12.5″	6.33	0.66	445	K0	
					163772	87910	17^{h} 57^{m} 26.99^{s}	+11° 02′ 40.4″	6.33	1.19	348	A1V	
84 G. Oph			84		154660	83738	17^{h} 06^{m} 52.94^{s}	−01° 39′ 22.0″	6.34	1.62	286	A9V	
97 G. Oph			97		155500	84113	17^{h} 11^{m} 45.22^{s}	+07° 53′ 41.0″	6.34	0.89	402	K0III	
133 G. Oph			133		157546	85195	17^{h} 24^{m} 37.03^{s}	−18° 26′ 44.7″	6.34	−0.30	695	B8V	
					166095	88862	18^{h} 08^{m} 33.74^{s}	+14° 17′ 05.0″	6.34	0.28	532	A5m	
2 G. Oph			2		144362	78849	16^{h} 05^{m} 44.53^{s}	−06° 17′ 28.1″	6.35	1.89	254	F2IV	
19 G. Oph			19		148390	80610	16^{h} 27^{m} 32.27^{s}	+02° 52′ 14.4″	6.35	0.23	547	K5	
87 G. Oph			87		154962	83906	17^{h} 08^{m} 54.55^{s}	−03° 52′ 57.4″	6.35	3.61	115	G8IV-V	
32 Sco		(32)	125		156992	84947	17^{h} 21^{m} 41.58^{s}	−24° 54′ 21.6″	6.36	−0.11	643	K3III	
147 G. Oph			147		158463	85622	17^{h} 29^{m} 47.37^{s}	−05° 55′ 09.6″	6.36	2.07	235	K0III	
V2126 Oph			188	V2126	164258	88148	18^{h} 00^{m} 15.66^{s}	+00° 37′ 46.2″	6.36	0.94	395	A3spe...	α² CVn variable
192 G. Oph			192		164432	88213	18^{h} 00^{m} 52.86^{s}	+06° 16′ 05.9″	6.36	−1.96	1502	B2IV	
144 G. Oph			144		158170	85474	17^{h} 28^{m} 02.39^{s}	−08° 12′ 29.0″	6.37	1.57	297	F5IV	
83 G. Oph			83		154610	83677	17^{h} 06^{m} 09.64^{s}	+09° 44′ 01.9″	6.38	0.04	604	K5	
					154619	83688	17^{h} 06^{m} 13.03^{s}	+10° 27′ 13.9″	6.38	1.04	381	G8III-IV	
3 G. Oph			3		144390	78870	16^{h} 05^{m} 59.83^{s}	−06° 08′ 23.1″	6.39	1.25	347	K0	
42 G. Oph			42		150493	81691	16^{h} 41^{m} 16.74^{s}	+01° 14′ 43.7″	6.40	−0.46	767	K0	
X Oph				X	172171	91389	18^{h} 38^{m} 21.0^{s}	+08° 50′ 02.0″	6.40			K0	Mira variable
163 G. Oph			163		160839	86725	17^{h} 43^{m} 17.71^{s}	−27° 53′ 02.3″	6.40	−3.37	2937	F0III/IV	
136 G. Oph			136		157864	85391	17^{h} 26^{m} 55.30^{s}	−25° 56′ 36.2″	6.42	0.86	423	B9.5/A0V	
V2114 Oph			145	V2114	158228	85450	17^{h} 27^{m} 44.07^{s}	+08° 26′ 31.7″	6.42	−0.59	823	M4III	
					159082	85826	17^{h} 32^{m} 14.88^{s}	+11° 55′ 48.0″	6.42	0.51	495	B9.5V	
V2393 Oph	(d)		(50 Cau)	V2393	171247	90971	18^{h} 33^{m} 23.30^{s}	+08° 16′ 05.8″	6.42	−2.01	1583	B8IIIp SiSr:	50 G. Ser Cau in Ophiuchus; α² CVn variable
123 G. Oph			123		156860	84780	17^{h} 19^{m} 46.49^{s}	+02° 08′ 22.1″	6.43	0.11	599	M5III	
205 G. Oph			205		167162	89347	18^{h} 13^{m} 52.22^{s}	+02° 23′ 36.6″	6.43	−1.35	1173	K2	
31 G. Oph			31		150052	81499	16^{h} 38^{m} 47.73^{s}	−08° 37′ 06.9″	6.44	−0.72	881	K5	
138 G. Oph			138		157856	85307	17^{h} 25^{m} 57.84^{s}	−01° 39′ 06.9″	6.44	2.49	201	F3V	
174 G. Oph			174		162113	87224	17^{h} 49^{m} 19.05^{s}	+01° 57′ 40.4″	6.44	1.34	342	K0III	
					148531	80708	16^{h} 28^{m} 42.35^{s}	+00° 03′ 18.3″	6.46	1.65	299	K5	
23 G. Oph			23		148743	80840	16^{h} 30^{m} 30.02^{s}	−07° 30′ 52.0″	6.46	−2.34	1874	A7Ib	
38 G. Oph			38		150381	81663	16^{h} 40^{m} 56.42^{s}	−08° 18′ 34.7″	6.47	0.54	499	K0	
					158716	85666	17^{h} 30^{m} 22.65^{s}	+11° 55′ 26.3″	6.47	1.59	309	A1V	
52 Oph		52	154	V2125	159376	86060	17^{h} 35^{m} 18.50^{s}	−22° 02′ 37.7″	6.47	−0.69	883	Ap Si	
64 G. Oph			64		153229	83090	16^{h} 58^{m} 41.56^{s}	−14° 52′ 10.6″	6.48	3.06	158	F3IV/V	
					171505	91090	18^{h} 34^{m} 47.49^{s}	+10° 53′ 31.2″	6.48	0.03	635	A1V	
20 G. Oph			20		148515	80719	16^{h} 28^{m} 48.99^{s}	−08° 07′ 43.2″	6.49	3.16	151	F2V	
HD 156846			121		156846	84856	17^{h} 20^{m} 34.31^{s}	−19° 20′ 01.5″	6.51	3.06	160	G1V	has a planet (b)
GJ 688					160346	86400	17^{h} 39^{m} 16.9^{s}	+03° 33′ 18.8″	6.52	6.07	35	K2V	
ο Oph B	ο	39	113		156350	84625	17^{h} 18^{m} 00.64^{s}	−24° 17′ 02.7″	6.59	0.75	481	G8/K0II	part of the ο Oph system
29 Sco		(29)			155685	84314	17^{h} 14^{m} 14.25^{s}	−26° 59′ 03.9″	6.65	1.80	304	F2/F3V	
HD 154088			73		154088	83541	17^{h} 04^{m} 28^{s}	−28° 34′ 58″	6.73	5.47	58	K0V	has a planet (b)
HD 155233					155233	84056	17^{h} 11^{m} 04.0^{s}	−20° 39′ 16″	6.80		245	K1III	has a planet (b)
38 Oph		38			156252	84605	17^{h} 17^{m} 39.53^{s}	−26° 37′ 44.5″	6.81	1.17	438	B9.5V	
HD 148427					148427	80687	16^{h} 28^{m} 28.15^{s}	−13° 23′ 58.7″	6.90	3.04	193	K0IV	Timir, has a planet (b)
HD 172522	(g)				172522	91571	18^{h} 40^{m} 22.61^{s}	+8° 52′ 06.4″	6.93	-3.25	3545	A2V	
18 Oph		18	47		151659		16^{h} 49^{m} 44.40^{s}	−24° 38′ 24.0″	7.10			A1m...	
HD 150433					150433	81681	16^{h} 41^{m} 08^{s}	−02° 51′ 26″	7.22		97	G0	has a planet (b)
HD 172588	(h)				172588	91594	18^{h} 40^{m} 46.10^{s}	40+8° 47′ 34.5″	7.22	0.46	730	F0V	δ Sct variable
Gliese 673					157881	85295	17^{h} 25^{m} 45.23^{s}	+02° 06′ 41.1″	7.54	8.10	25	K5	nearby; high proper motion star
HD 157172					157172	85017	17^{h} 22^{m} 35^{s}	−19° 36′ 58″	7.86		104	G8.5V	has a planet (b)
HD 149143					149143	81022	16^{h} 32^{m} 51.05^{s}	+02° 05′ 05.4″	7.90	3.89	207	G0	Rosalíadecastro, has a planet (b)
HD 170469					170469	90593	18^{h} 29^{m} 10.98^{s}	+11° 41′ 43.8″	8.21	4.15	212	G5IV	has a planet (b)
HD 164509					164509	88268	18^{h} 01^{m} 31^{s}	+00° 06′ 16″	8.24		170	G5V	has a planet (b)
HD 171028					171028		18^{h} 32^{m} 15.49^{s}	+06° 56′ 44.7″	8.31		294	G0V	has a planet (b)
HD 152581					152581	82651	16^{h} 53^{m} 44^{s}	+11° 58′ 25″	8.54		607	K0	Mahsati, has a planet (b)
HD 159243					159243	85911	17^{h} 33^{m} 22.0^{s}	+05° 42′ 03″	8.65		226	G0V	has two planets (b & c)
Barnard's Star				V2500		87937	17^{h} 57^{m} 48.50^{s}	+04° 41′ 36.2″	9.54	13.24	5.94	M4Ve	2nd nearest star system; V2500 Oph; has 4 planets (e, b, c, d)
Wolf 1061				V2306		80824	16^{h} 30^{m} 18.06^{s}	−12° 39′ 45.3″	10.12	11.97	13.91	M3.5	30th nearest star system; V2306 Oph
HAT-P-57							18^{h} 18^{m} 58.0^{s}	+10° 35′ 50″	10.47		988		has a transiting planet (b)
WASP-163							17^{h} 06^{m} 09.0^{s}	−10° 24′ 47″	12.54			G8	has a transiting planet (b)
CoRoT-6							18^{h} 44^{m} 17.42^{s}	+06° 39′ 48.0″	13.9			F5V	has a transiting planet (b)
GJ 1214							17^{h} 15^{m} 18.94^{s}	+04° 57′ 49.7″	14.67	14.10	42	M4.5	has a transiting super-Earth planet (b)
CoRoT-25							18^{h} 42^{m} 31.0^{s}	+06° 30′ 50″	15.0		3262	G0V	has a transiting planet (b)
CoRoT-29							18^{h} 35^{m} 37.0^{s}	+06° 28′ 47″	15.35		2495	KOV	has a transiting planet (b)
CoRoT-26							18^{h} 39^{m} 00.0^{s}	+06° 58′ 12″	15.76		5447	G8IV	has a transiting planet (b)
SN 1604							17^{h} 30^{m} 35.98^{s}	−21° 28′ 56.2″	n/a			S	Kepler's star; supernova
Table legend: • Name = Proper name • B = Bayer designation • F or/and G. = Flamsteed designation or Gould designation • Var = Variable-star designation • HD = Henry Draper Catalogue designation number • HIP = Hipparcos Catalogue designation number • RA = Right ascension for the Epoch/Equinox J2000.0 • Dec = Declination for the Epoch/Equinox J2000.0 • vis. mag. = visual magnitude (m or m_{v}), also known as apparent magnitude • abs. mag. = absolute magnitude (M_{v}) • Dist. (ly) = Distance in light-years from Earth • Sp. class = Spectral class of the star in the stellar classification system • Notes = Common name(s) or alternate name(s); comments; notable properties [for example: multiple star status, range of variability if it is a variable star, exoplanets, etc.]

== See also ==
- List of stars by constellation
