= Helkath =

Helkath may refer to:

- The star Kappa Ophiuchi
- Helkath, a location on the boundary of the Tribe of Asher mentioned in the Book of Joshua.
