= HD 154088 =

Star in the constellation Ophiuchus

Observation data Epoch J2000.0 Equinox ICRS
- Constellation: Ophiuchus
- Right ascension: 17^{h} 04^{m} 27.843^{s}
- Declination: −28° 34′ 57.64″
- Apparent magnitude (V): 6.584±0.010

Characteristics
- Evolutionary stage: subgiant
- Spectral type: K0IV-V
- B−V color index: 0.814±0.034

Astrometry
Radial velocity (R_{v})	14.2972±0.0003 km/s
Proper motion (μ)	RA: +83.309 mas/yr Dec.: −268.614 mas/yr
Parallax (π)	54.726±0.0236 mas
Distance	59.60 ± 0.03 ly (18.273 ± 0.008 pc)
Absolute magnitude (M_{V})	5.33

Details
Mass	0.91±0.02 M_{☉}
Radius	0.95±0.03 R_{☉}
Luminosity	0.68^{+0.06}_{−0.05} L_{☉}
Surface gravity (log g)	4.37±0.07 cgs
Temperature	5,374±43 K
Metallicity [Fe/H]	+0.28±0.03 dex
Rotation	42.6±4.4 days
Rotational velocity (v sin i)	1.9±0.5 km/s
Age	8±2 Gyr

Other designations
- CD−28°12769, GJ 652, HIP 83541, SAO 184990

Database references
SIMBAD	data
Exoplanet Archive	data

HD 154088 is a seventh magnitude metal-rich K-type subgiant that lies 59.6 light-years away in the constellation of Ophiuchus. The star is orbited by a hot Super-Earth.

== Properties ==
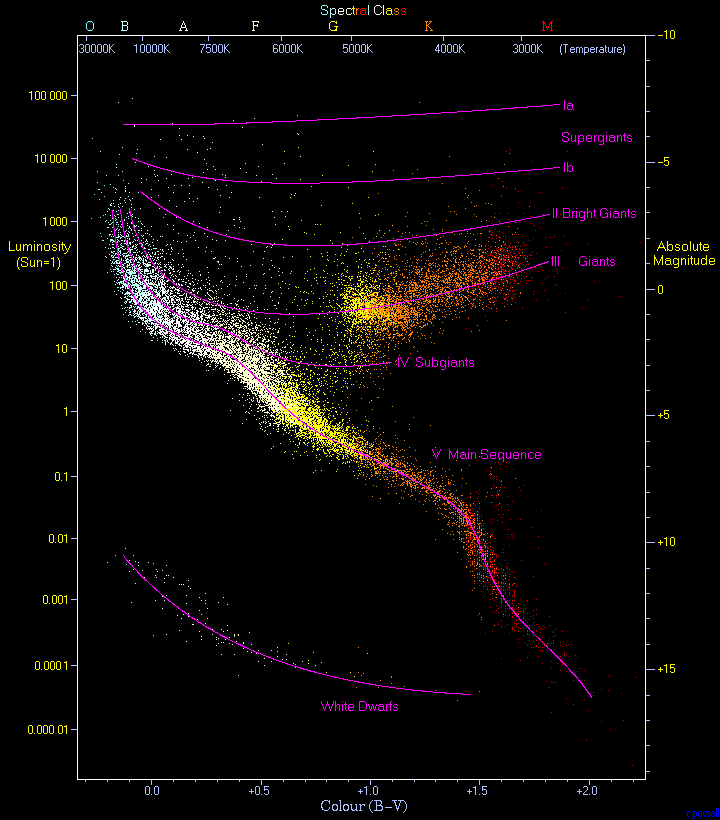

HD 154088 is a modestly bright star that lies at the bottom of Ophiuchus, near to the border with Scorpius and near to the plane of the Milky Way. The star was recognised as a high proper motion star during the last century, and early Earth-based parallax measurements such as that of the Gliese Catalogue of Nearby Stars indicated a distance of about 50 light-years.

The star has a spectral type of K0IV-V, indicating that it has characteristics intermediate to a subgiant and main sequence star that is about 350 degrees cooler than the Sun. On the Hertzsprung-Russell diagram (left), the star lies slightly above the main sequence. This is because the star is very metal-rich; with an Fe/H of 0.3 dex the star has about twice the solar abundance of iron, which makes HD 154088 fall into the somewhat vague group of super metal-rich (SMR) stars. The giant planet occurrence rate of Fe/H = 0.3 stars is on the order of 30%, but HD 154088 is not currently known to host any giant planets.

HD 154088 has a pronounced magnetic field. It also has a magnetic cycle similar to the Sun, though its length is not well constrained.

A survey in 2015 ruled out the existence of any additional stellar companions at projected distances from 8 to 119 astronomical units.

== Planetary system ==
A planet orbiting HD 154088 discovered with the HARPS spectrograph was announced in a September 2011 preprint. With a minimum mass of 6 M_{🜨}, the companion falls into the regime of Super-Earths. HD 154088 has also been observed under the Keck Eta-Earth radial velocity survey. A 2010 paper about this survey listed a "Candidate 1" that has similar properties to HD 154088 b (orbital period = 18.1 days, minimum mass = 6.5 M_{🜨}), and so may be the same detection. The planet's existence was finally confirmed and formally published in 2021.

The HD 154088 planetary system
Companion (in order from star)	Mass	Semimajor axis (AU)	Orbital period (days)	Eccentricity	Inclination (°)	Radius
b	≥6.6±0.8 M_{🜨}	0.134±0.002	18.56±0.01	<0.344	—	—
