= HD 164509 =

Binary star in the constellation Ophiuchi

Observation data Epoch J2000 Equinox ICRS
- Constellation: Ophiuchus
- Right ascension: 18^{h} 01^{m} 31.228^{s}
- Declination: +00° 06′ 16.40″
- Apparent magnitude (V): 8.10

Characteristics
- Evolutionary stage: main sequence
- Spectral type: G2V + M6.5V
- B−V color index: 0.665±0.018
- J−H color index: 0.28
- J−K color index: 0.36

Astrometry
Radial velocity (R_{v})	13.68±0.16 km/s
Proper motion (μ)	RA: −7.876 mas/yr Dec.: −20.462 mas/yr
Parallax (π)	18.6155±0.0219 mas
Distance	175.2 ± 0.2 ly (53.72 ± 0.06 pc)
Absolute magnitude (M_{V})	4.64

Orbit
Primary	HD 164509 A
Name	HD 164509 B
Period (P)	∼180 yr
Semi-major axis (a)	36.5 ±1.9 au
Eccentricity (e)	0.87 ±0.21

Details

HD 164509 A
Mass	1.103±0.004 M_{☉}
Radius	1.041±0.003 R_{☉}
Luminosity	1.150±0.001 L_{☉}
Surface gravity (log g)	4.44±0.01 cgs
Temperature	5,865±7 K
Metallicity [Fe/H]	0.21 dex
Rotational velocity (v sin i)	2.4±0.5 km/s
Age	1.5±0.2 Gyr

HD 164509 B
Mass	0.45±0.01 M_{☉}
Temperature	2,710 K

Other designations
- BD+00 3837, HD 164509, HIP 88268, 2MASS J18013121+0006163, DENIS J084619.3-080136, Gaia DR2 4275421969292868224

Database references
SIMBAD	164509 data

HD 164509 is a binary star system in the constellation of Ophiuchus. The primary component has an orbiting exoplanet companion. This system is located at a distance of 175 light years based on parallax measurements, and is drifting further away with a radial velocity of 13.7 km/s. It has an absolute magnitude of 4.64, but at that distance the system has an apparent visual magnitude of 8.10, which is too faint to be seen with the naked eye.

The primary component is a Sun-like G-type main-sequence star with a stellar classification of G2V. It is young and metal rich, having heavy elements abundance 160% of solar. The star has a modest level of magnetic activity in its chromosphere. It has 1.10 times the mass of the Sun and 1.04 times the Sun's radius. This star is radiating 1.15 times the luminosity of the Sun from its photosphere at an effective temperature of 5,865 K.

Initially it was thought the system consisted of a single star, but in 2016 it was discovered the primary is accompanied by the M-class red dwarf star at a projected separation of 36.5±1.9 AU. The evidence for this stellar companion being on a bound orbit was further fortified in 2017.

== Planetary system ==
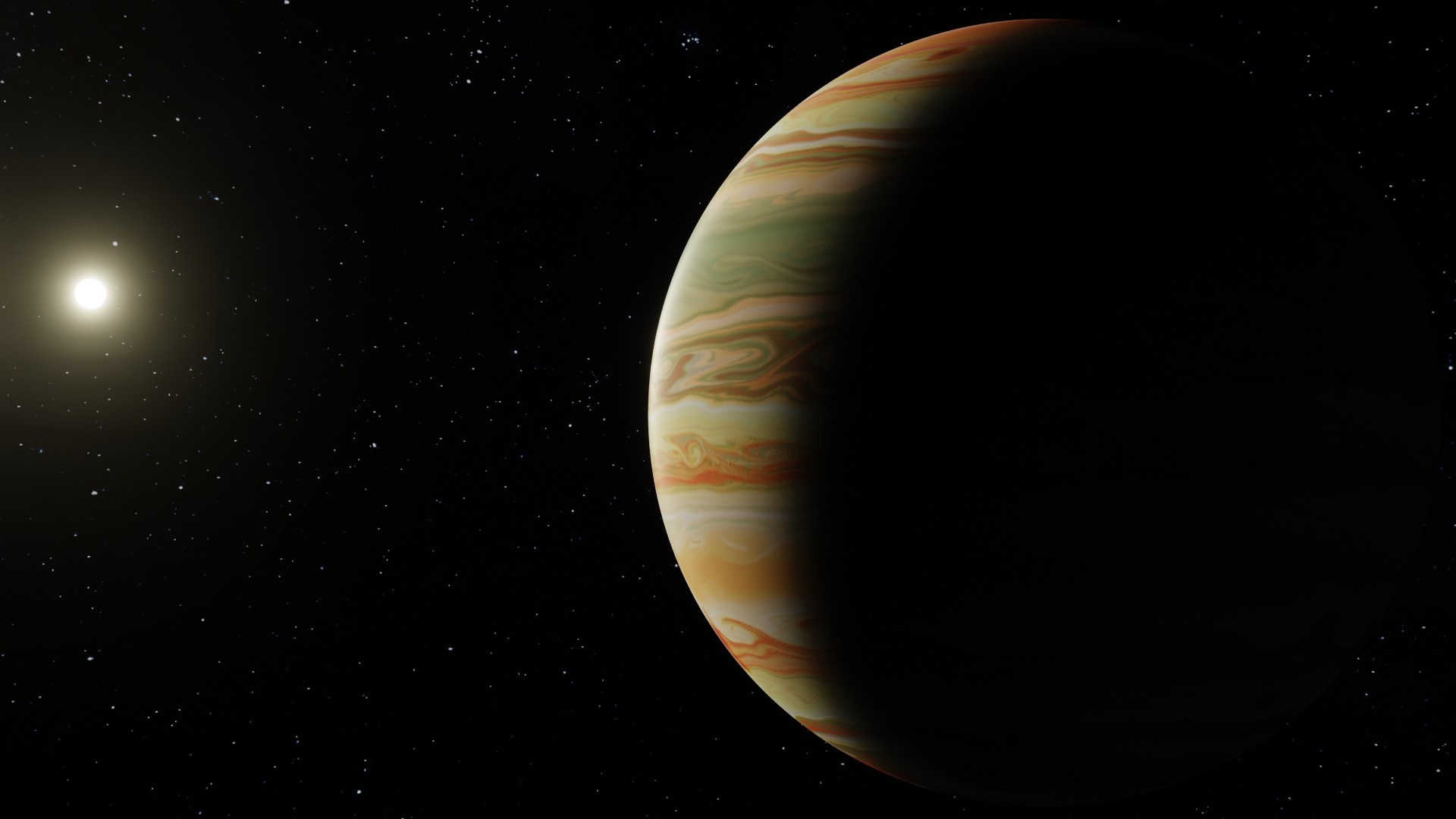
Artistic illustration of the planet

In 2011, a gas giant, HD 164509 Ab, was discovered orbiting the primary of HD 164509 using Doppler spectroscopy. Given the binary nature of this system, the planet HD 164509 Ab could not have formed on the current orbit, which is unstable in long term. Instead, it may be a captured body formed elsewhere.

The HD 164509 planetary system
Companion (in order from star)	Mass	Semimajor axis (AU)	Orbital period (days)	Eccentricity	Inclination (°)	Radius
Ab	0.48±0.09 M_{J}	0.875±0.008	282.4±3.8	0.26±0.14	—	—
