= CoRoT-26b =

Exoplanet

Discovery
- Discovered by: CoRoT
- Discovery date: 2012
- Detection method: Transit

Orbital characteristics
- Semi-major axis: 0.0526
- Eccentricity: 0
- Orbital period (sidereal): 4.2 d
- Star: CoRoT-26

Physical characteristics
- Mean radius: 1.26 R_{J}
- Mass: 0.52 M_{J}

CoRoT-26b is a gas giant exoplanet that orbits a G-type star, CoRoT-26. It has a mass of 0.52 Jupiters, takes 4.2 days to complete one orbit of its star, and is 0.0526 AU from its star. Its discovery was announced in 2013.
