= Iota Ophiuchi =

Star in the constellation Ophiuchus

- Location of ι Ophiuchi (circled)

Observation data Epoch J2000 Equinox ICRS
- Constellation: Ophiuchus
- Right ascension: 16^{h} 54^{m} 00.47151^{s}
- Declination: +10° 09′ 55.2982″
- Apparent magnitude (V): 4.39

Characteristics
- Evolutionary stage: main sequence
- Spectral type: B8V
- U−B color index: −0.32
- B−V color index: −0.08

Astrometry
Radial velocity (R_{v})	−19.0±1.6 km/s
Proper motion (μ)	RA: −53.80 mas/yr Dec.: −34.04 mas/yr
Parallax (π)	13.30±0.22 mas
Distance	245 ± 4 ly (75 ± 1 pc)
Absolute magnitude (M_{V})	0.01

Details
Mass	3.14±0.03 M_{☉}
Radius	2.8 R_{☉}
Luminosity	141+6 −5 L_{☉}
Surface gravity (log g)	4.03 cgs
Temperature	11,220±78 K
Metallicity [Fe/H]	+0.09 dex
Rotational velocity (v sin i)	124 km/s
Age	217 Myr

Other designations
- ι Oph, 25 Oph, BD+10°3092, FK5 1442, GC 22775, HD 152614, HIP 82673, HR 6281, SAO 102458

Database references
SIMBAD	data

ι Ophiuchi, Latinized as Iota Ophiuchi, is a single star in the equatorial constellation of Ophiuchus, positioned near the constellation border with Hercules. It makes a naked-eye double with nearby Kappa Ophiuchi, appearing as a faint, blue-white hued star with an apparent visual magnitude of 4.39. The star is approximately 245 light years from the Sun based on parallax, but is drifting closer with a radial velocity of −19 km/s.

This object is a B-type main-sequence star with a stellar classification of B8V. It is an estimated 217 million years old with a moderately high rate of spin, showing a projected rotational velocity of 124 km/s. The star has 3.1 times the mass of the Sun and around 2.8 times the Sun's radius. Iota Ophiuchi is radiating 141 times the luminosity of the Sun from its photosphere at an effective temperature of 11,220 K. It displays an infrared excess, suggesting the presence of circumstellar material.
