= 41 Ophiuchi =

Binary star system in the constellation Ophiuchus

- Location of 41 Ophiuchi (circled)

Observation data Epoch J2000 Equinox ICRS
- Constellation: Ophiuchus
- Right ascension: 17^{h} 16^{m} 36.68653^{s}
- Declination: −00° 26′ 43.0915″
- Apparent magnitude (V): 4.72 (4.92 + 7.51)

Characteristics
- Evolutionary stage: horizontal branch
- Spectral type: K2III
- U−B color index: +1.11
- B−V color index: +1.15

Astrometry
| Radial velocity (R_{v}) | −0.16 km/s |
| Proper motion (μ) | RA: −31.645 mas/yr Dec.: −57.144 mas/yr |
| Parallax (π) | 16.1517±0.2358 mas |
| Distance | 202 ± 3 ly (61.9 ± 0.9 pc) |
| Absolute magnitude (M_{V}) | 0.72 |

Orbit
| Period (P) | 140.76±0.23 yr |
| Semi-major axis (a) | 0.959±0.008″ |
| Eccentricity (e) | 0.866±0.003 |
| Inclination (i) | 65.1±0.0° |
| Longitude of the node (Ω) | 220.5±0.0° |
| Periastron epoch (T) | 1890.53±0.36 B |
| Argument of periastron (ω) (secondary) | 287.5±0.0° |

Details

41 Oph A
| Mass | 1.46 M_{☉} |
| Radius | 11.80+0.27 −0.39 R_{☉} |
| Luminosity | 60.3±1.0 L_{☉} |
| Surface gravity (log g) | 2.42 cgs |
| Temperature | 4,509±65 K |
| Metallicity [Fe/H] | +0.06 dex |
| Rotational velocity (v sin i) | 2.6 km/s |
| Age | 3.73 Gyr |

Other designations
- 41 Oph, BD−00°3255, GC 23320, HD 156266, HIP 84514, HR 6415, SAO 141586, CCDM J17166-0027AB, WDS J17166-0027

Database references
| SIMBAD | data |

41 Ophiuchi is a binary star system in the zodiac constellation of Ophiuchus, and is positioned less than half a degree to the south of the celestial equator. It is visible to the naked eye as a faint, orange-hued point of light with a combined apparent visual magnitude of 4.72. The distance to this system is approximately 202 light years based on parallax.

This is a visual binary with an orbital period of 141 years and an eccentricity of 0.866. The magnitude 4.92 primary, designated component A, is an aging K-type giant star with a stellar classification of K2III. It is a red clump giant, which indicates it is on the horizontal branch and is generating energy through helium fusion at its core. The star is 3.7 billion years old with 1.46 times the mass of the Sun and has expanded to nearly 12 times the Sun's radius. It is radiating 60 times the Sun's luminosity from its swollen photosphere at an effective temperature of 4,509 K.

The secondary companion, component B, has a visual magnitude of 7.51 and an angular separation of 0.70″ from the primary along a position angle of 22°, as of 2017.
