= Omicron Ophiuchi =

Double star in the constellation Ophiuchus

- Location of ο Ophiuchi (circled in red)

Observation data Epoch J2000 Equinox ICRS
- Constellation: Ophiuchus
- A
- Right ascension: 17^{h} 18^{m} 00.68112^{s}
- Declination: −24° 17′ 12.8535″
- Apparent magnitude (V): 5.14
- B
- Right ascension: 17^{h} 18^{m} 00.60620^{s}
- Declination: −24° 17′ 02.8150″
- Apparent magnitude (V): 6.59

Characteristics

A
- Spectral type: G8III
- U−B color index: 0.98
- B−V color index: 1.046±0.005

B
- Spectral type: F6IV-V
- U−B color index: 0.05
- B−V color index: 0.510±0.015

Astrometry

A
| Radial velocity (R_{v}) | −28.97±0.13 km/s |
| Proper motion (μ) | RA: −57.544 mas/yr Dec.: −7.725 mas/yr |
| Parallax (π) | 11.5763±0.1756 mas |
| Distance | 282 ± 4 ly (86 ± 1 pc) |
| Absolute magnitude (M_{V}) | 0.38 |

B
| Radial velocity (R_{v}) | −29.70 km/s |
| Proper motion (μ) | RA: −56.561 mas/yr Dec.: −12.457 mas/yr |
| Parallax (π) | 11.6213±0.0603 mas |
| Distance | 281 ± 1 ly (86.0 ± 0.4 pc) |
| Absolute magnitude (M_{V}) | 1.66 |

Details

A
| Radius | 12.30+0.20 −0.32 R_{☉} |
| Luminosity | 75.3±1.3 L_{☉} |
| Surface gravity (log g) | 2.69 cgs |
| Temperature | 4,849+63 −40 K |
| Metallicity [Fe/H] | 0.33 dex |

B
| Radius | 2.99+0.10 −0.12 R_{☉} |
| Luminosity | 12.629±0.086 L_{☉} |
| Temperature | 6,296+130 −105 K |
| Metallicity [Fe/H] | 0.23±0.08 dex |

Other designations
- ο Oph, 39 Ophiuchi, CD−24°13255, CCDM J17180-2417, WDS J17180-2417
- A: GC 23344, HD 156349, HIP 84626, HR 6424, SAO 185238
- B: GC 23343, HD 156350, HIP 84625, HR 6425, SAO 185237

Database references
| SIMBAD | AB |
- A
- B

ο Ophiuchi, Latinized as Omicron Ophiuchi, is a wide double star in the equatorial constellation of Ophiuchus. The co-moving pair are visible to the naked eye as a dim point of light, with the two components having apparent visual magnitudes of 5.14 and 6.59. As of 2015, they had an angular separation of 10.0″ along a position angle of 354°. The distance to both stars is approximately 281 light-years based on parallax, and they are drifting closer to the Sun with a radial velocity of around −29 km/s.

The brighter member of the pair, designated component A, is an aging giant star with a stellar classification of G8III. With the supply of hydrogen at its core exhausted, it has expanded to 12 times the radius of the Sun. The star is radiating 75 times the Sun's luminosity from its enlarged photosphere at an effective temperature of 4,849 K. The secondary star, component B, has a class of F6IV-V, matching an F-type star with a luminosity class that is a blend of traits from a main-sequence and a subgiant star. It has three times the Sun's radius and is radiating 12.6 times the Sun's luminosity at 6,296 K.
