= 44 Ophiuchi =

Star in the constellation Ophiuchus

- Location of 44 Ophiuchi (circled)

Observation data Epoch J2000 Equinox ICRS
- Constellation: Ophiuchus
- Right ascension: 17^{h} 26^{m} 22.21749^{s}
- Declination: −24° 10′ 31.1190″
- Apparent magnitude (V): 4.16

Characteristics
- Evolutionary stage: main sequence
- Spectral type: kA5hA9mF1III
- U−B color index: +0.12
- B−V color index: +0.28

Astrometry
| Radial velocity (R_{v}) | −37.20 km/s |
| Proper motion (μ) | RA: +0.10 mas/yr Dec.: −118.18 mas/yr |
| Parallax (π) | 39.22±0.24 mas |
| Distance | 83.2 ± 0.5 ly (25.5 ± 0.2 pc) |
| Absolute magnitude (M_{V}) | 2.13 |

Details
| Mass | 1.77 M_{☉} |
| Radius | 1.9 R_{☉} |
| Luminosity | 13 L_{☉} |
| Surface gravity (log g) | 4.15 cgs |
| Temperature | 7,559 K |
| Metallicity [Fe/H] | +0.30 dex |
| Rotational velocity (v sin i) | 78 km/s |
| Age | 1.028 Gyr |

Other designations
- b Oph, 44 Oph, CD−24°13337, FK5 1457, GC 23597, GJ 9591, HD 157792, HIP 85340, HR 6486, SAO 185401

Database references
| SIMBAD | data |

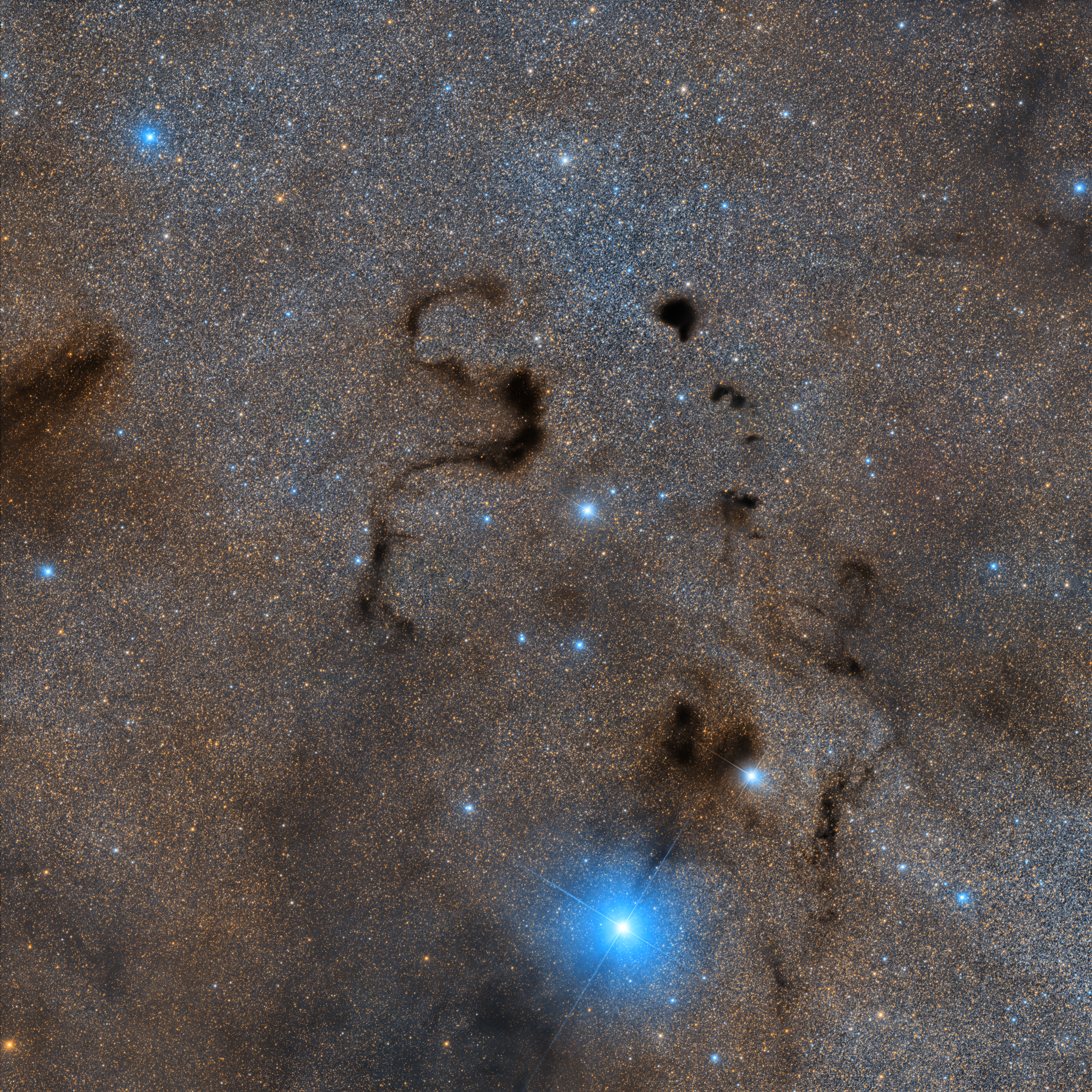
44 Ophiuchi (44 Oph) is the big bright blue star near the bottom center. Near the middle is the Snake Nebula

44 Ophiuchi is a single star in the constellation Ophiuchus. It has the Bayer designation b Ophiuchi, while 44 Ophiuchi is the Flamsteed designation. It is visible to the naked eye as a faint, white-hued star with an apparent visual magnitude of 4.16. The distance to this object is approximately 83.2 light years based on parallax. It is drifting closer to the Earth with a heliocentric radial velocity of -37.2 km/s, and is predicted to come within 30 light-years around 585,000 years from now.

This is an Am star with a stellar classification of kA5hA9mF1III, indicating it has the luminosity class of a giant star with a spectrum that matches an A5 star based on the calcium K line, and an A9 star from the hydrogen and metal lines. It is around a billion years old with 1.77 times the mass of the Sun and 1.9 times the Sun's girth. The star is radiating 13 times the Sun's luminosity from its photosphere at an effective temperature of 7,559 K. It retains a moderately high rotation rate, showing a projected rotational velocity of 78 km/s.
