= Sigma Ophiuchi =

Star in the constellation Ophiuchus

σ Ophiuchi
- Location of σ Ophiuchi (circled)

Observation data Epoch J2000 Equinox ICRS
- Constellation: Ophiuchus
- Right ascension: 17^{h} 26^{m} 30.8806^{s}
- Declination: +04° 08′ 25.2876″
- Apparent magnitude (V): 4.31 (4.25 - 4.51)

Characteristics
- Spectral type: K2 III
- U−B color index: +1.57
- B−V color index: +1.51
- Variable type: suspected

Astrometry
Radial velocity (R_{v})	−27.81 km/s
Proper motion (μ)	RA: +1.459 mas/yr Dec.: +6.760 mas/yr
Parallax (π)	3.7578±0.1559 mas
Distance	870 ± 40 ly (270 ± 10 pc)
Absolute magnitude (M_{V})	−2.85

Details
Mass	5–9 M_{☉}
Radius	100±30 R_{☉}
Luminosity	2630±894 L_{☉}
Surface gravity (log g)	1.3±0.5 cgs
Temperature	4,129±566 K
Metallicity [Fe/H]	−0.07 dex
Rotational velocity (v sin i)	4.2 km/s

Other designations
- σ Oph, 49 Ophiuchi, NSV 8664, BD+04°3422, FK5 1459, GC 23621, HD 157999, HIP 85355, HR 6498, SAO 122387, 2MASS J17263087+0408252

Database references
SIMBAD	data

Sigma Ophiuchi, Latinized from σ Ophiuchi, is a single, orange-hued star in the equatorial constellation Ophiuchus. Its apparent visual magnitude is 4.31, which is bright enough to be faintly visible to the naked eye. The annual parallax shift of 3.62 mas as seen from Earth provides a distance estimate of roughly 900 light years. It is moving closer to the Sun with a radial velocity of −28 km/s.

This is an evolved giant star of type K with a stellar classification of K2 III. Wittkowski et al. (2017) consider it to have a luminosity class of II-III, suggesting it is in a transitional zone between giants and supergiant stars. It has around 5 to 9 times the mass of the Sun and one hundred times the Sun's radius. The star is radiating 2,600 times the Sun's luminosity from its enlarged photosphere at an effective temperature of 4,130 K.
