= Psi Ophiuchi =

Star in the constellation Ophiuchus

- Location of ψ Ophiuchi (circled)

Observation data Epoch J2000 Equinox ICRS
- Constellation: Ophiuchus
- Right ascension: 16^{h} 24^{m} 06.18464^{s}
- Declination: −20° 02′ 14.3784″
- Apparent magnitude (V): 4.50

Characteristics
- Evolutionary stage: horizontal branch
- Spectral type: K0- II-III
- U−B color index: +0.84
- B−V color index: +1.03

Astrometry
Radial velocity (R_{v})	+0.60 km/s
Proper motion (μ)	RA: −20.29 mas/yr Dec.: −47.65 mas/yr
Parallax (π)	16.35±0.25 mas
Distance	199 ± 3 ly (61.2 ± 0.9 pc)
Absolute magnitude (M_{V})	0.806

Details
Mass	1.61 M_{☉}
Radius	11.45 R_{☉}
Luminosity	65.9 L_{☉}
Surface gravity (log g)	2.56 cgs
Temperature	4,864 K
Metallicity [Fe/H]	−0.20 dex
Rotational velocity (v sin i)	< 1.0 km/s

Other designations
- ψ Oph, 4 Ophiuchi, BD−19°4365, FK5 1373, GC 22042, HD 147700, HIP 80343, HR 6104, SAO 159892

Database references
SIMBAD	data

Psi Ophiuchi, which is Latinized from ψ Ophiuchi, is a single star in the equatorial constellation of Ophiuchus, next to the western constellation border with Scorpius. It has an orange hue and is visible to the naked eye as a faint point of light with an apparent visual magnitude of 4.50. It is approximately 199 light-years from Earth, based on parallax.

It is an aging giant or bright giant star with a stellar classification of K0- II-III, indicating it has exhausted the supply of hydrogen at its core, then cooled and expanded. It presently has 11 times the girth of the Sun and 1.6 times the Sun's mass. It is a red clump giant, meaning it is on the horizontal branch and is generating energy through core helium fusion. It is radiating 66 times the luminosity of the Sun from its swollen photosphere at an effective temperature of 4,864 K.
