= 74 Ophiuchi =

Star in the constellation Ophiuchus

- Location of 74 Ophiuchi (circled)

Observation data Epoch J2000 Equinox ICRS
- Constellation: Ophiuchus
- Right ascension: 18^{h} 20^{m} 52.06435^{s}
- Declination: +03° 22′ 37.7817″
- Apparent magnitude (V): 4.85

Characteristics
- Spectral type: G8III
- U−B color index: +0.61
- B−V color index: +0.91

Astrometry
| Radial velocity (R_{v}) | +4.35 km/s |
| Proper motion (μ) | RA: −7.646 mas/yr Dec.: +12.546 mas/yr |
| Parallax (π) | 13.7320±0.2060 mas |
| Distance | 238 ± 4 ly (73 ± 1 pc) |
| Absolute magnitude (M_{V}) | 0.34 |

Details
| Mass | 2.38 M_{☉} |
| Radius | 10.52+0.32 −1.04 R_{☉} |
| Luminosity | 66.0±1.2 L_{☉} |
| Surface gravity (log g) | 2.70 cgs |
| Temperature | 5,073+271 −76 K |
| Metallicity [Fe/H] | −0.21 dex |
| Rotational velocity (v sin i) | 0.0 km/s |
| Age | 1.73 Gyr |

Other designations
- 74 Oph, BD+03°3680, FK5 1476, GC 25036, GJ 9615 A, HD 168656, HIP 89918, HR 6866, SAO 123377, CCDM J18209+0323A, WDS J18209+0323A

Database references
| SIMBAD | data |

74 Ophiuchi is a suspected binary star in the equatorial constellation of Ophiuchus, near the border with Serpens Cauda. It is visible to the naked eye as a faint, yellow-hued point of light with a combined apparent visual magnitude of 4.85. The system is located at a distance of 238 light-years from the Sun based on parallax, and is drifting further away with a radial velocity of +4.4 km/s.

The primary member, designated component A, is an aging giant star with a stellar classification of G8III and an estimated age of 1.73 billion years. Having exhausted the hydrogen supply at its core, the star has expanded to 10.5 times the Sun's radius. It is a red clump giant, which means it is on the horizontal branch and is generating energy through helium fusion at its core. The star has 2.4 times the mass of the Sun and is radiating 66 times the Sun's luminosity from its swollen photosphere at an effective temperature of around 5,073 K.

The magnitude 11.5 secondary, component B, lies at an angular separation of 28.1″ from the primary, as of 2008. A visual companion, component C, is magnitude 12.28 and has a separation of 57.9″.
