= 36 Ophiuchi =

Triple star system in the constellation Ophiuchus

- Location of 36 Ophiuchi in the constellation Ophiuchus

Observation data Epoch J2000 Equinox ICRS
- Constellation: Ophiuchus
- Right ascension: A: 17^{h} 15^{m} 20.7836^{s} B: 17^{h} 15^{m} 20.9838^{s} C: 17^{h} 16^{m} 13.3624^{s}
- Declination: A: −26° 36′ 06.117″ B: −26° 36′ 10.173″ C: −26° 32′ 46.137″
- Apparent magnitude (V): 5.08/5.03/6.34

Characteristics
- Spectral type: A: K2V; B: K1V; C: K5V
- Variable type: C: RS CVn

Astrometry

36 Oph A
Radial velocity (R_{v})	+0.26±0.12 km/s
Proper motion (μ)	RA: −498.600 mas/yr Dec.: −1,149.158 mas/yr
Parallax (π)	168.0031±0.1343 mas
Distance	19.41 ± 0.02 ly (5.952 ± 0.005 pc)

36 Oph B
Radial velocity (R_{v})	+0.10±0.13 km/s
Proper motion (μ)	RA: −465.861 mas/yr Dec.: −1,141.168 mas/yr
Parallax (π)	168.1303±0.1081 mas
Distance	19.40 ± 0.01 ly (5.948 ± 0.004 pc)

36 Oph C
Radial velocity (R_{v})	−0.07±0.12 km/s
Proper motion (μ)	RA: −479.573 mas/yr Dec.: −1,124.332 mas/yr
Parallax (π)	167.9617±0.0311 mas
Distance	19.418 ± 0.004 ly (5.954 ± 0.001 pc)

Orbit
Primary	36 Oph A
Secondary	36 Oph B
Period (P)	501+14 −10 yr
Semi-major axis (a)	74.9+1.5 −1.2 AU
Eccentricity (e)	0.8999+0.0032 −0.0033

Details

36 Oph A
Mass	0.803+0.032 −0.031 M_{☉}
Radius	0.817±0.016 R_{☉}
Luminosity	0.326±0.008 L_{☉}
Habitable zone inner limit	0.36 AU
Habitable zone outer limit	0.87 AU
Temperature	5,103±29 K
Metallicity [Fe/H]	−0.23 dex
Rotation	20.69±0.40 days
Age	1.43 Gyr

36 Oph B
Mass	0.867±0.033 M_{☉}
Radius	0.721±0.044 R_{☉}
Luminosity	0.32 L_{☉}
Habitable zone inner limit	0.43 AU
Habitable zone outer limit	1.03 AU
Surface gravity (log g)	4.61 cgs
Temperature	5,171±71 K
Metallicity [Fe/H]	−0.22 dex
Rotation	21.11±0.40 days
Age	1.43 Gyr

36 Oph C
Mass	0.72±0.01 M_{☉}
Radius	0.688±0.064 R_{☉}
Luminosity	0.14 L_{☉}
Habitable zone inner limit	0.32 AU
Habitable zone outer limit	0.79 AU
Surface gravity (log g)	4.70 cgs
Temperature	4,474±22 K
Metallicity [Fe/H]	−0.22 dex
Rotation	18.0±0.4 days
Age	590±70 Myr

Other designations
- 36 Oph, WDS J17153-2636
- AB: CD−26°12026, GJ 663, HIP 84405, PLX 3908.00
- A: Guniibuu, HD 155886, HR 6402, SAO 185198, LHS 437
- B: HD 155885, HR 6401, SAO 185199, LHS 438
- C: 30 Sco, V2215 Oph, CD−26°12036, GJ 664, HD 156026, HIP 84478, SAO 185213, LHS 439, PLX 3913.00

Database references
SIMBAD	AB
- A
- B
- C
Exoplanet Archive	B
- C
ARICNS	A
- B
- C

36 Ophiuchi (also officially named Guniibuu for component A) is a triple star system approximately 19.5 light-years from Earth in the constellation Ophiuchus.

== Nomenclature ==
36 Ophiuchi is the system's Flamsteed designation. Component C (HD 156026) was also historically called 30 Scorpii.

In the culture of the Kamilaroi and Euahlayi Aboriginal peoples in New South Wales, Australia, the star is called Guniibuu and represents the robin red-breast bird (Petroica boodang). In 2016, the IAU organized a Working Group on Star Names (WGSN) to catalog and standardize proper names for stars. The WGSN approved the name Guniibuu for 36 Ophiuchi A on 10 August 2018 and it is now so included in the List of IAU-approved Star Names.

== Characteristics ==
The primary and secondary stars (also known as HD 155886) are nearly identical orange main-sequence dwarfs of spectral type K2/K1. This binary is unusual because its eruptions do not seem to conform to the Waldmeier effect; that is, the strongest eruptions of HD 155886 are not the ones characterized by the fast eruption onset or buildup.

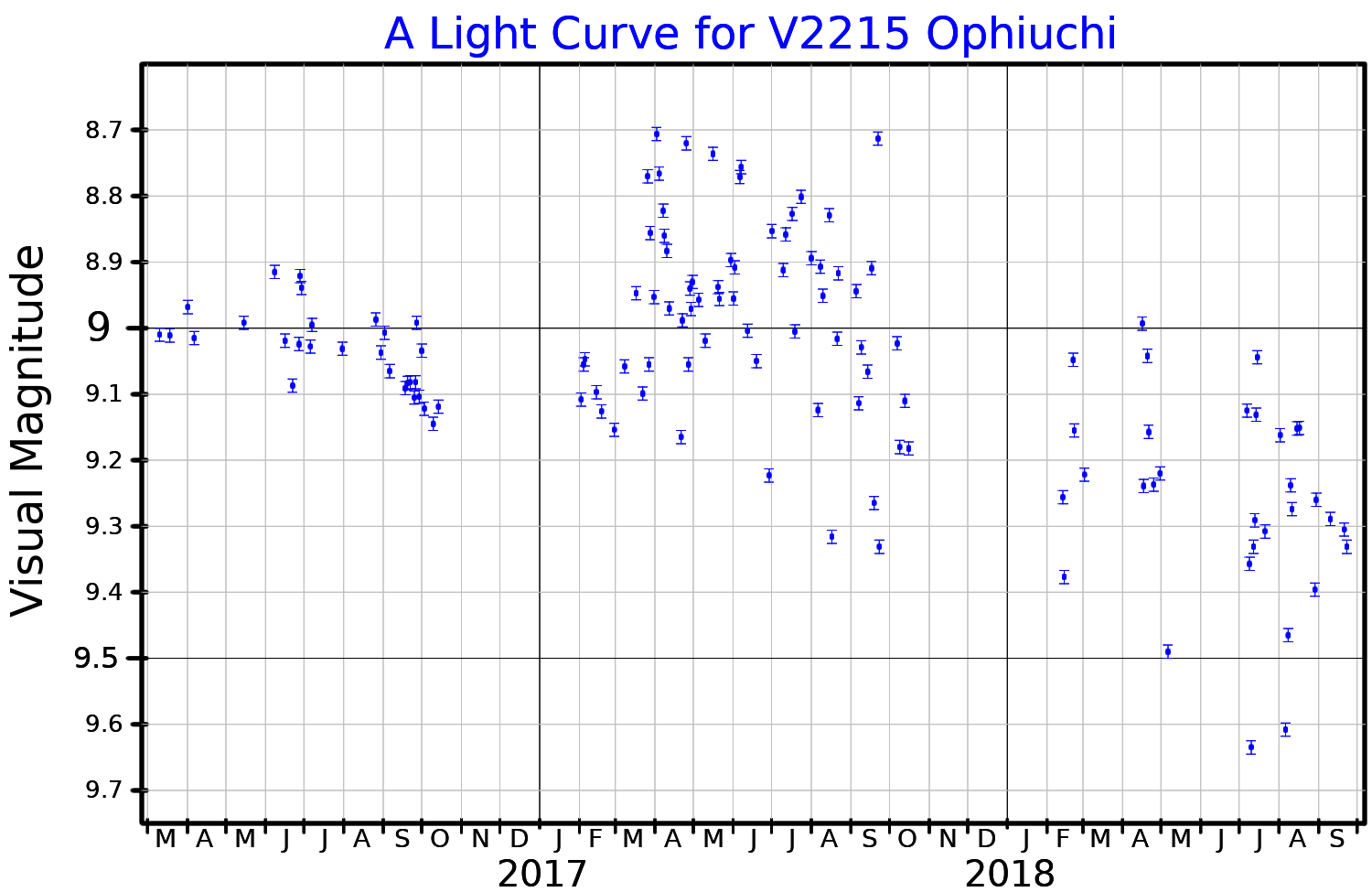
A visual band light curve for 36 Ophiuchi C (V2215 Ophiuchi), plotted from ASAS-SN data

The tertiary star is an more distant orange main-sequence dwarf of spectral type K5. The age for this star derived using gyrochronology is about 600 million years, while the age derived for the AB pair is 1.43 billion years. This discrepancy suggest that the A/B stars interacted with each other and slowed down their rotation periods, providing a spuriously higher age.

It is separated from the A-B pair by 700 arcseconds, compared to a minimum of 4.6 arcseconds for A-B, so its effect on the movements of the A-B pair is small. A and B have active chromospheres. At present the distance between the stars forming the AB-pair is 5.1 arcseconds and the position angle is 139 degrees, while star C is 731.6 arcseconds away from the A-component and situated at a position angle of 74 degrees.

== Hunt for substellar objects ==
The McDonald Observatory team has set limits to the presence of one or more planets around 36 Ophiuchi A with masses between 0.13 and 5.4 Jupiter masses and average separations spanning between 0.05 and 5.2 astronomical units (AU), although beyond 1.5 AU orbits are inherently unstable around either 36 Ophiuchi A or 36 Ophiuchi B.

The star C (or namely HD 156026) is among five nearby paradigms as K-type stars of a type in a 'sweet spot’ between Sun-analog stars and M stars for the likelihood of evolved life, per analysis of Giada Arney from NASA's Goddard Space Flight Center. It presents a significant difference on proper motion measurements taken by the Hipparcos and Gaia spacecraft, suggesting the presence of a giant planet.

== Observation ==
On 26 October 2021, it was occulted by Venus as viewed from the Indian Ocean.

== See also ==
- 70 Ophiuchi
- List of nearest K-type stars
