= Phi Ophiuchi =

Single star in the constellation Ophiuchus

φ Ophiuchi
- Location of φ Ophiuchi (circled)

Observation data Epoch J2000 Equinox ICRS
- Constellation: Ophiuchus
- Right ascension: 16^{h} 31^{m} 08.36732^{s}
- Declination: −16° 36′ 45.8306″
- Apparent magnitude (V): 4.27

Characteristics
- Spectral type: G8+IIIa
- U−B color index: +0.71
- B−V color index: +0.92

Astrometry
Radial velocity (R_{v})	−33.46 km/s
Proper motion (μ)	RA: −45.35 mas/yr Dec.: −37.34 mas/yr
Parallax (π)	13.39±0.24 mas
Distance	244 ± 4 ly (75 ± 1 pc)
Absolute magnitude (M_{V})	−0.08

Details
Mass	3.16±0.04 M_{☉}
Radius	13.40±0.31 R_{☉}
Luminosity	111.8±4.3 L_{☉}
Surface gravity (log g)	2.72±0.02 cgs
Temperature	5,131±32 K
Metallicity [Fe/H]	0.16±0.10 dex
Rotational velocity (v sin i)	3.6 km/s
Age	330±10 Myr

Other designations
- φ Oph, 8 Ophiuchi, BD−16 4298, GC 22200, HD 148786, HIP 80894, HR 6147, SAO 159963, CCDM J16311-1636A, WDS J16311-1637A

Database references
SIMBAD	data

Phi Ophiuchi, a name Latinized from φ Ophiuchi, is a single star in the equatorial constellation of Ophiuchus. It has a yellow hue and is faintly visible to the naked eye with an apparent visual magnitude of 4.27. The star is located at a distance of approximately 244 light-years from the Sun based on parallax, but it is drifting closer with a radial velocity of −33.5 km/s.

The stellar classification of Phi Opiuchi is G8+IIIa, an evolved giant star that has exhausted the supply of hydrogen at its core. In 2000, D. R. Alves identified it as a red clump giant on the horizontal branch that is generating energy by core helium fusion. However, S. Reffert and associates in 2015 instead placed it on the red-giant branch. A 2018 study by S. Stock and associates used Bayesian estimates to arrive at a 94% chance the star is on the horizontal branch.

The star is around 360 million years old with an estimated 3.16 times the mass of the Sun and 13.4 times the Sun's radius. It is radiating 112 times the luminosity of the Sun from its enlarged photosphere at an effective temperature of 5,131 K.

It has two visual companions, component B, at magnitude 12.9 and separation 41.3", and component C, at magnitude 10.8 and separation 119.8".
