= 71 Ophiuchi =

Giant star in the constellation of Ophiuchus

- Location of 71 Ophiuchi (circled)

Observation data Epoch J2000 Equinox ICRS
- Constellation: Ophiuchus
- Right ascension: 18^{h} 07^{m} 18.35888^{s}
- Declination: +08° 44′ 01.9181″
- Apparent magnitude (V): 4.64

Characteristics
- Spectral type: G8III
- U−B color index: +0.73
- B−V color index: +0.97

Astrometry
Radial velocity (R_{v})	−3.00±0.09 km/s
Proper motion (μ)	RA: +9.857 mas/yr Dec.: +29.770 mas/yr
Parallax (π)	13.1352±0.1891 mas
Distance	248 ± 4 ly (76 ± 1 pc)
Absolute magnitude (M_{V})	0.03

Details
Mass	2.87±0.09 M_{☉}
Radius	12.55+0.27 −0.34 R_{☉}
Luminosity	88.8±1.5 L_{☉}
Surface gravity (log g)	3.00±0.02 cgs
Temperature	5,001+70 −52 K
Metallicity [Fe/H]	0.10±0.01 dex
Rotational velocity (v sin i)	0.32±0.45 km/s
Age	400±30 Myr

Other designations
- 71 Oph, BD+08°3582, GC 24693, HD 165760, HIP 88765, HR 6770, SAO 123140

Database references
SIMBAD	data

71 Ophiuchi is a single star in the equatorial constellation of Ophiuchus. It is visible to the naked eye as a faint, yellow-hued point of light with an apparent visual magnitude of 4.64. The star is located approximately 273 light years away from the Sun based on parallax, and is moving closer with a radial velocity of −3 km/s.

At the estimated age of 400 million years, this is an aging giant star with a stellar classification of G8III, having exhausted the supply of hydrogen at its core and expanded to around 13 times the Sun's radius. It is a red clump giant, which means it is on the horizontal branch and is generating energy through helium fusion at its core. The star has 2.9 times the mass of the Sun and is radiating 89 times the Sun's luminosity from its swollen photosphere at an effective temperature of 5,001 K.
