= E Ophiuchi =

Star in the Ophiuchus constellation

e Ophiuchi
Observation data Epoch J2000.0 Equinox J2000.0
- Constellation: Ophiuchus
- Right ascension: 17^{h} 18^{m} 36.99^{s}
- Declination: +10° 51′ 52.1″
- Apparent magnitude (V): 5.03

Characteristics
- Evolutionary stage: red giant branch
- Spectral type: K4II-III
- U−B color index: 1.89
- B−V color index: 1.55
- R−I color index: 0.83

Astrometry
Radial velocity (R_{v})	1.89 km/s
Proper motion (μ)	RA: +7.676 mas/yr Dec.: −97.830 mas/yr
Parallax (π)	6.3784±0.1045 mas
Distance	511 ± 8 ly (157 ± 3 pc)
Absolute magnitude (M_{V})	−0.86

Details
Mass	1.1 M_{☉}
Radius	53 R_{☉}
Luminosity	554 L_{☉}
Surface gravity (log g)	1.06 cgs
Temperature	3,836 K
Rotational velocity (v sin i)	5.47 km/s
Age	10.3 Gyr

Other designations
- e Oph, 66 Her, BD+11°3156, HD 156681, HR 6433, SAO 102725

Database references
SIMBAD	data

e Ophiuchi (HD 156681) is a star in the constellation Ophiuchus near the border with Hercules, which it had been mistakenly catalogued 66 Herculis. It has an apparent magnitude of 5.03.
