= 72 Ophiuchi =

Binary star system in the constellation Ophiuchus

- Location of 72 Ophiuchi (circled)

Observation data Epoch J2000 Equinox ICRS
- Constellation: Ophiuchus
- Right ascension: 18^{h} 07^{m} 20.98393^{s}
- Declination: +09° 33′ 49.8501″
- Apparent magnitude (V): 3.73 + 14.0

Characteristics
- Evolutionary stage: main sequence
- Spectral type: A5 V
- U−B color index: +0.10
- B−V color index: +0.12

Astrometry
Radial velocity (R_{v})	−23.90 km/s
Proper motion (μ)	RA: −62.17 mas/yr Dec.: +79.66 mas/yr
Parallax (π)	37.55±0.21 mas
Distance	86.9 ± 0.5 ly (26.6 ± 0.1 pc)
Absolute magnitude (M_{V})	1.58

Details
Mass	1.99 M_{☉}
Radius	1.9 R_{☉}
Luminosity	20 L_{☉}
Surface gravity (log g)	4.04 cgs
Temperature	8,718 K
Metallicity [Fe/H]	+0.09 dex
Rotational velocity (v sin i)	65 km/s
Age	250 Myr

Other designations
- 72 Oph, BD+09°3564, FK5 680, GC 24695, GJ 9615 A, HD 165777, HIP 88771, HR 6771, SAO 123142, CCDM J18073+0934A, WDS J18073+0934A

Database references
SIMBAD	data

72 Ophiuchi is a binary star system in the equatorial constellation of Ophiuchus. It is visible to the naked eye as a faint, white-hued point of light with a combined apparent visual magnitude of 3.73. It is located approximately 86.9 light years away from the Sun based on parallax, but is moving closer with a heliocentric radial velocity of -23.9 km/s.

As of 2008, the pair had an angular separation of 25″. According to Gray et al. (2003), the primary component has a stellar classification of A5 V, matching an A-type main-sequence star. Cowley et al. (1969) had assigned it to a class of A4 IVs, suggesting it is a sharp-lined (s) subgiant star. The latter class is still in use by some sources.

The primary is 250 million years old with double the mass of the Sun and is spinning with a moderate projected rotational velocity of 65 km/s. It is radiating 20 times the luminosity of the Sun from its photosphere at an effective temperature of 8,718 K. It displays an infrared excess, suggesting a debris disk is orbiting the star with a mean separation of 82.96 AU and temperature of 60 K. The system is a source of X-ray emission, which is most likely coming from the 14th magnitude companion.

There are additional visual companions: component C with magnitude 11.5 lies at an angular separation of 64″ from the primary, while component D, has magnitude 14.8 and separation 24".

This star was once considered part of the obsolete constellation Taurus Poniatovii, the brightest star in it. After the International Astronomical Union officially recognised constellations, it was placed in Ophiuchus.
