= Upsilon Ophiuchi =

Multiple star in the constellation Ophiuchus

- Location of υ Ophiuchi (circled)

Observation data Epoch J2000 Equinox ICRS
- Constellation: Ophiuchus
- Right ascension: 16^{h} 27^{m} 48.17331^{s}
- Declination: −08° 22′ 18.4156″
- Apparent magnitude (V): 4.62

Characteristics
- Spectral type: kA2hA5VmA5
- U−B color index: +0.06
- B−V color index: +0.16

Astrometry
Radial velocity (R_{v})	−30.60 km/s
Proper motion (μ)	RA: −97.526 mas/yr Dec.: −33.97 mas/yr
Parallax (π)	25.0819±0.2300 mas
Distance	130 ± 1 ly (39.9 ± 0.4 pc)
Absolute magnitude (M_{V})	1.75

Orbit
Primary	Aa1
Name	Aa2
Period (P)	27.218±0.0005 d
Semi-major axis (a)	≥ 0.0583 AU
Eccentricity (e)	0.744±0.002
Periastron epoch (T)	2,438,914.84±0.01 JD
Argument of periastron (ω) (secondary)	333.7±0.7°
Semi-amplitude (K_{1}) (primary)	34.9±0.3 km/s
Semi-amplitude (K_{2}) (secondary)	41.1±0.3 km/s

Orbit
Primary	Aa
Name	Ab
Period (P)	82.8±1.4 yr
Semi-major axis (a)	0.79±0.03″
Eccentricity (e)	0.45±0.03
Inclination (i)	31.2±5.7°
Longitude of the node (Ω)	86.8±6.9°
Periastron epoch (T)	B 1994.1±1.0
Argument of periastron (ω) (secondary)	177.9±7.4°

Details

Aa1
Mass	1.83 M_{☉}
Radius	1.6 (Note: Calculated using angular diameters (0.37, 0.33, 0.20 and 0.16 milliarcseconds) and a distance of 39.9 parsecs via the equation R/R_{☉} = (107.5 • 𝜃 • d)/1000, where 𝜃 is the angular diameter and d is the distance.) R_{☉}
Luminosity	16.56 L_{☉}
Surface gravity (log g)	4.45 cgs
Temperature	8,364 K
Metallicity [Fe/H]	+0.14 dex
Rotational velocity (v sin i)	44 km/s
Age	50 Myr

Aa2
Mass	1.47 M_{☉}
Radius	1.4 R_{☉}
Age	50 Myr

Ab1
Mass	0.82 M_{☉}
Radius	0.86 R_{☉}
Age	45 Myr

Ab2
Mass	0.70 M_{☉}
Radius	0.69 R_{☉}
Age	45 Myr

Other designations
- Alkarab, υ Oph, 3 Ophiuchi, BD−08°4243, FK5 3299, GC 22134, HD 148367, HIP 80628, HR 6129, SAO 141187, CCDM J16278-0822AB, WDS J16278-0822

Database references
SIMBAD	data

Aa1
Period = 27.s d
Ab2
Period = 82.8 yr
Ab1
Sep = 0.06 au
Ab2

Hierarchy of orbits

Upsilon Ophiuchi is a quadruple star system in the equatorial constellation of Ophiuchus. It has a white hue and is faintly visible to the naked eye with an apparent visual magnitude of 4.62. The distance to this system is approximately 130 light years based on parallax. It is drifting closer with a radial velocity of −30.6 km/s.

The variable radial velocity of the brighter component was first observed by H. A. Abt in 1961. It is a double-lined spectroscopic binary system with an orbital period of 27.2 days and an eccentricity of 0.74. They have a combined magnitude of 4.71. Both components are similar stars with a combined stellar classification of kA2hA5VmA5, and one or both are Am stars. The fainter component has an 82.8 year orbit with the brighter pair at an eccentricity of 0.45, and is itself binary, making the system a quadruple. The system is a source for X-ray emission.

This system forms part of the Upsilon Ophiuchi cluster, a small group of six stars which share similar kinematics and are spread over about eight degrees. The two brightest stars, apart from Upsilon Ophiuchi itself, are sometimes listed as components B and C: B is HD 148300, and C is HD 144660. Both are 9th-magnitude K-class dwarfs.
