= 66 Ophiuchi =

Star in the constellation Ophiuchus

- Location of 66 Ophiuchi (circled)

Observation data Epoch J2000 Equinox ICRS
- Constellation: Ophiuchus
- Right ascension: 18^{h} 00^{m} 15.79825^{s}
- Declination: +04° 22′ 07.0163″
- Apparent magnitude (V): 4.60

Characteristics
- Evolutionary stage: main sequence
- Spectral type: B2Ve
- U−B color index: −0.81
- B−V color index: −0.02
- Variable type: γ Cas

Astrometry
Radial velocity (R_{v})	−12.80 km/s
Proper motion (μ)	RA: +1.23 mas/yr Dec.: −12.73 mas/yr
Parallax (π)	5.01±0.26 mas
Distance	650 ± 30 ly (200 ± 10 pc)
Absolute magnitude (M_{V})	−2.8 + −0.2

Orbit
Period (P)	23421.1 ± 4.1 d
Semi-major axis (a)	178.36 ± 1.37 mas
Eccentricity (e)	0.142 ± 0.006
Inclination (i)	75.90 ± 0.69°
Longitude of the node (Ω)	338.87 ± 0.31°
Periastron epoch (T)	JD 2452658.5 ± 50.2
Argument of periastron (ω) (secondary)	115.24 ± 0.95°

Details

66 Oph A
Mass	9.6 M_{☉}
Luminosity	1524.63 L_{☉}
Surface gravity (log g)	3.69 cgs
Temperature	22,000 K
Metallicity [Fe/H]	0.00 dex
Rotational velocity (v sin i)	250 km/s
Age	14.0±3.2 Myr

66 Oph B
Mass	3.8 M_{☉}

Other designations
- 66 Oph, V2048 Oph, BD+04°3570, GC 24500, HD 164284, HIP 88149, HR 6712, SAO 123005, WDS J18003+0422AB

Database references
SIMBAD	data

66 Ophiuchi is a binary variable star in the equatorial constellation of Ophiuchus. It has the variable star designation V2048 Ophiuchi, while 66 Ophiuchi is the Flamsteed designation. This object is visible to the naked eye as a faint, blue-white hued point of light with a baseline apparent visual magnitude of 4.60. It is located approximately 650 light years away from the Sun based on parallax, but is drifting closer with a radial velocity of −13 km/s. The star has a peculiar velocity of 13.1±3.2 km/s relative to its neighbors.

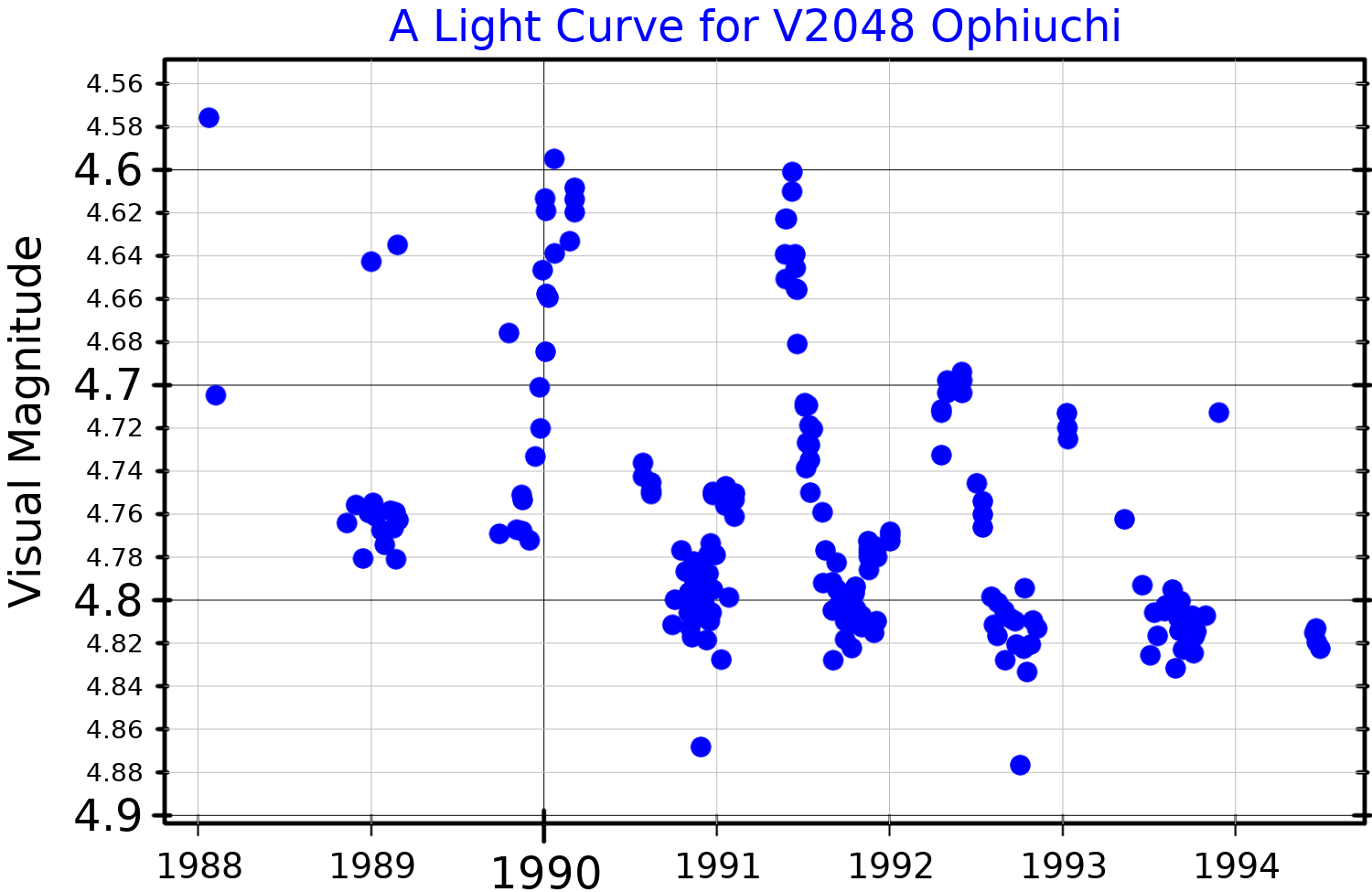
A visual band light curve for V2048 Ophiuchi, adapted from Floquet et al. (2002)

The primary star, known as 66 Ophiuchi A, is a main sequence Be star with a stellar classification of B2Ve. Be stars are rapidly rotating stars that eject gas from their equators due to their rotation, forming disks that produce emission lines. 66 Ophiuchi A's disk extends out to 115 R_{☉}. Like many other Be stars, it is a γ Cas variable; a shell star with a circumstellar disc of gas and is exhibiting irregular changes in brightness, ranging from 4.85 up to 4.55 magnitude. The star is 14 million years old with 9.6 times the Sun's mass and is spinning rapidly with a projected rotational velocity of 250 km/s. It is radiating 1,525 times the Sun's luminosity from its photosphere at an effective temperature of 22,000 K. Because of its rotation, it has a polar equatorial radius 4.50 that of the Sun, but an equatorial radius 5.11 that of the Sun.

A magnitude 6.5 visual companion at an angular separation of 0.1″ has been reported, and is known as 66 Ophiuchi B. It is 2.61 magnitudes fainter than the primary. This corresponds to a mass of about 3.8 times that of the Sun, and a spectral class of about B8.
