= 68 Ophiuchi =

Binary star system in the constellation Ophiuchus

- Location of 68 Ophiuchi (circled)

Observation data Epoch J2000 Equinox ICRS
- Constellation: Ophiuchus
- Right ascension: 18^{h} 01^{m} 45.19884^{s}
- Declination: +01° 18′ 18.2775″
- Apparent magnitude (V): 4.42 + 7.48

Characteristics
- Evolutionary stage: main sequence
- Spectral type: A2Vn
- U−B color index: +0.02
- B−V color index: +0.04

Astrometry
Radial velocity (R_{v})	+6.00 km/s
Proper motion (μ)	RA: +15.93 mas/yr Dec.: −13.29 mas/yr
Parallax (π)	11.15±0.60 mas
Distance	290 ± 20 ly (90 ± 5 pc)
Absolute magnitude (M_{V})	−0.34

Orbit
Period (P)	175.74±4.65 yr
Semi-major axis (a)	1.090±0.027″
Eccentricity (e)	0.831±0.035
Inclination (i)	69.5±3.0°
Longitude of the node (Ω)	160.2±1.6°
Periastron epoch (T)	2019.87±1.48
Argument of periastron (ω) (secondary)	78.9±4.7°

Details

68 Oph A
Mass	3.07 M_{☉}
Radius	4.5 R_{☉}
Luminosity	160 L_{☉}
Surface gravity (log g)	3.76 cgs
Temperature	9,594 K
Metallicity [Fe/H]	−0.14 dex
Rotational velocity (v sin i)	201 km/s

Other designations
- BD+01°3560, CCDM J18018+0118AB, GC 24534, HIP 88290, HR 6723, HD 164577, NSV 10009, SAO 123035, WDS J18018+0118AB

Database references
SIMBAD	data

68 Ophiuchi is a binary star system in the equatorial constellation of Ophiuchus. It is visible to the naked eye as a faint star with an apparent visual magnitude of 4.42. The system is located around 89.69 parsecs (292.5 ly) distant from the Sun, based on parallax, and is drifting further away with a radial velocity of +6 km/s.

This is a visual binary with an orbital period of 177 years and an eccentricity of 0.83. The brighter member, component A, is an A-type main-sequence star of spectral type A2Vn, a star that is currently fusing its core hydrogen. The 'n' suffix indicates "nebulous" lines due to rapid rotation. The star is suspected of varying between magnitudes 4.42 and 4.48. It displays an infrared excess that matches a circumstellar disk of dust orbiting 32.5 AU from the star with a mean temperature of 160 K. There is evidence that it is a close spectroscopic binary. The secondary companion, component B, is of magnitude 7.48.
