= Lambda Ophiuchi =

Star system in the constellation Ophiuchus

- Location of λ Ophiuchi (circled in red)

Observation data Epoch J2000 Equinox ICRS
- Constellation: Ophiuchus
- Right ascension: 16^{h} 30^{m} 54.82314^{s}
- Declination: +01° 59′ 02.1209″
- Apparent magnitude (V): 3.82 (4.18 (A) + 5.22 (B) + 11.0 (C))

Characteristics
- Spectral type: A0V + A4V
- U−B color index: +0.01
- B−V color index: +0.022±0.014
- Variable type: Suspected

Astrometry
Radial velocity (R_{v})	−16.0±1.5 km/s
Proper motion (μ)	RA: −30.98 mas/yr Dec.: −73.42 mas/yr
Parallax (π)	18.84±0.55 mas
Distance	173 ± 5 ly (53 ± 2 pc)
Absolute magnitude (M_{V})	0.20

Orbit
Primary	A
Name	B
Period (P)	129.51±0.40 yr
Semi-major axis (a)	0.898″±0.006″ (46.1±0.3 AU)
Eccentricity (e)	0.623±0.005
Inclination (i)	21.9±1.6°
Longitude of the node (Ω)	68.9±5.3°
Periastron epoch (T)	1939.4±0.2
Argument of periastron (ω) (secondary)	141.3±5.3°

Orbit
Primary	Aa
Name	Ab
Period (P)	41.93±0.01 days
Semi-major axis (a)	0.368±0.006 AU
Eccentricity (e)	0.71±0.01
Inclination (i)	101.6±0.2°
Longitude of the node (Ω)	123.3±0.4°
Periastron epoch (T)	60102.25±0.18 MJD
Argument of periastron (ω) (secondary)	118.1±1.0°

Details

Aa
Mass	2.39 M_{☉}
Radius	2.45 R_{☉}
Luminosity	76.0+5.1 −4.8 L_{☉}
Temperature	9,550 K
Rotational velocity (v sin i)	138 km/s
Age	400 Myr

Ab
Mass	1.62 M_{☉}
Radius	1.56 R_{☉}
Temperature	7,710 K
Age	400 Myr

B
Mass	1.82 M_{☉}
Radius	1.73 R_{☉}
Temperature	8,330 K
Age	400 Myr

C
Mass	0.62 M_{☉}
Radius	0.58 R_{☉}
Luminosity	0.09 L_{☉}
Temperature	4,157 K

Other designations
- Marfik, λ Oph, 10 Oph, NSV 7784, BD+02°3118, HD 148857, HIP 80883, HR 6149, SAO 121658, ADS 10087, WDS 16309+0159

Database references
SIMBAD	data

λ Ophiuchi, Latinized as Lambda Ophiuchi, is a quadruple star system in the equatorial constellation of Ophiuchus. It has the traditional name Marfik /ˈmɑːrfɪk/, which now applies exclusively to the primary component. The system is visible to the naked eye as a faint point of light with an apparent visual magnitude of 3.82. It is located approximately 173 light-years from the Sun, based on its parallax, but is drifting closer with a radial velocity of –16 km/s.

== Nomenclature ==
λ Ophiuchi is the system's Bayer designation. The designations of the three components as Lambda Ophiuchi A, B and C derive from the convention used by the Washington Multiplicity Catalog (WMC) for multiple star systems, and adopted by the International Astronomical Union (IAU).

It bore the traditional name Marfik (or Marsik), from the Arabic مرفق marfiq "elbow". In 2016, the International Astronomical Union organized a Working Group on Star Names (WGSN) to catalogue and standardize proper names for stars. The WGSN decided to attribute proper names to individual stars rather than entire multiple systems. It approved the name Marfik for the component Lambda Ophiuchi A on 12 September 2016 and it is now so included in the List of IAU-approved Star Names.

== System ==
The system can be divided in three pairs and is in a hierarchical architecture, with orbits inside others. The inner pair is made up of the components Aa and Ab, which take 41.93 to complete an orbit around each other and are separated by 0.368 astronomical units. It has a combined visual magnitude of 4.18. The primary is an A-type main-sequence star, with a class of A0V, indicating that it is generating energy through core hydrogen fusion. It has about 2.45 times the Sun's radius and an effective temperature of 9,550 K, giving it the blue-white hue typical of early A-type stars. The secondary is slightly cooler and smaller, with 1.56 times the Sun's radius and an effective temperature of 7,710 K. This temperature is close to the dividing line between F and A-type stars and give it a white hue.

The A-B system has an orbital period of 129.5 years, a physical separation of 46.1 AU and an eccentricity of 0.623. The secondary, component B, of magnitude 5.22, is also an A-type main-sequence star, with a spectral class A4V. It is 1.73 times as large as the Sun and has an effective temperature of 8,330 K, giving it the white hue of A-type stars.

Component C is magnitude 11.0 and lies at an angular separation of 119″ from the A-B pair, translating to 6,370 astronomical units at its distance. Any orbit would last for hundreds of thousands of years. It has a common proper motion and is at approximately the same distance as the other stars. It has a mass 62% of the Sun's, a radius 58% of the Sun's, a temperature of about 4,157 K, and 9% of the Sun's luminosity. It has an estimated spectral type of K6.
