= Mu Ophiuchi =

Star in the constellation Ophiuchus

- Location of μ Ophiuchi (circled)

Observation data Epoch J2000 Equinox ICRS
- Constellation: Ophiuchus
- Right ascension: 17^{h} 37^{m} 50.71308^{s}
- Declination: −08° 07′ 07.5749″
- Apparent magnitude (V): 4.62

Characteristics
- Spectral type: B8II-IIIp:Mn
- U−B color index: −0.20
- B−V color index: +0.11

Astrometry
Radial velocity (R_{v})	−18.50 km/s
Proper motion (μ)	RA: −11.31 mas/yr Dec.: −20.47 mas/yr
Parallax (π)	4.32±0.20 mas
Distance	750 ± 30 ly (230 ± 10 pc)
Absolute magnitude (M_{V})	−2.24

Details
Radius	11.1+2.1 −0.6 R_{☉}
Luminosity	398.7±26.8 L_{☉}
Temperature	7,748+210 −651 K
Metallicity [Fe/H]	+0.00 dex
Rotational velocity (v sin i)	95 km/s

Other designations
- μ Oph, 57 Ophiuchi, BD−08°4472, FK5 3399, GC 23889, HD 159975, HIP 86284, HR 6567, SAO 141772

Database references
SIMBAD	data

μ Ophiuchi, Latinized as Mu Ophiuchi, is a solitary, blue-white hued star in the equatorial constellation of Ophiuchus. It is visible to the naked as a faint point of light with an apparent visual magnitude of 4.62. This object is located approximately 760 light years away from the Sun based on parallax, but is drifting closer with a radial velocity of −18.5 km/s.

This object has a stellar classification of B8II-IIIp:Mn, showing a luminosity class with mixed traits of a giant or bright giant star. The suffix notation indicates it is a candidate chemically peculiar star with an overabundance of manganese in its spectrum. It may be a mercury-manganese star. This object has 11 times the radius of the Sun and is radiating nearly 400 times the Sun's luminosity from its photosphere at an effective temperature of 7,748 K. It is spinning with a projected rotational velocity of 95 km/s.

In 2006, a new nearby star cluster, Mamajek 2 (/ˈmæmədʒɛk/), was discovered. Mu Ophiuchi is a candidate member. The cluster has an estimated age of 120±25 million years.
