= 45 Ophiuchi =

Star in the constellation Ophiuchus

- Location of 45 Ophiuchi (circled)

Observation data Epoch J2000 Equinox ICRS
- Constellation: Ophiuchus
- Right ascension: 17^{h} 27^{m} 21.27571^{s}
- Declination: −29° 52′ 01.3262″
- Apparent magnitude (V): 4.28

Characteristics
- Spectral type: F5III-IV
- U−B color index: +0.11
- B−V color index: +0.40

Astrometry
Radial velocity (R_{v})	+38.00 km/s
Proper motion (μ)	RA: +17.08 mas/yr Dec.: −138.02 mas/yr
Parallax (π)	29.23±0.20 mas
Distance	111.6 ± 0.8 ly (34.2 ± 0.2 pc)
Absolute magnitude (M_{V})	1.61

Details
Mass	1.71 M_{☉}
Radius	3.2 R_{☉}
Luminosity	19.07 L_{☉}
Surface gravity (log g)	3.67 cgs
Temperature	6,750 K
Metallicity [Fe/H]	+0.10 dex
Rotational velocity (v sin i)	65.4 km/s
Age	1.24±0.18 Gyr

Other designations
- d Oph, 45 Oph, CD−29°13557, FK5 646, GC 23627, HD 157919, HIP 85423, HR 6492, SAO 185412

Database references
SIMBAD	data

45 Ophiuchi is a single star in the equatorial constellation of Ophiuchus, along the southern border with Scorpius. It has the Bayer designation d Ophiuchi, while 45 Ophiuchi is the Flamsteed designation. In the past it had the designation Theta Telescopii. This object is visible to the naked eye as a faint, yellow-white-hued star with an apparent visual magnitude of 4.28. It is located approximately 111.6 light-years away from the Sun based on parallax. The star is drifting further from the Earth with a heliocentric radial velocity of +38 km/s.

This object has a stellar classification of F5III-IV, matching an F-type star with a luminosity class displaying mixed traits of a subgiant and a giant star. It is 1.2 billion years old with 1.7 times the mass of the Sun and 3.2 times the Sun's radius. The star is radiating 19 times the luminosity of the Sun from its photosphere at an effective temperature of 6,750 K. It is spinning with a projected rotational velocity of 65 km/s.
