= Tau Ophiuchi =

Multiple star in the constellation Ophiuchus

τ Ophiuchi
- Location of τ Ophiuchi (circled)

Observation data Epoch J2000 Equinox ICRS
- Constellation: Ophiuchus
- Right ascension: 18^{h} 03^{m} 04.91992^{s}
- Declination: −08° 10′ 49.2586″
- Apparent magnitude (V): 5.24 (A) / 5.94 (B)

Characteristics
- Spectral type: F2V(A) / F5V (B)
- U−B color index: +0.05 (A)
- B−V color index: +0.38 (A)

Astrometry
Radial velocity (R_{v})	−38.39 km/s
Proper motion (μ)	RA: +15.78 mas/yr Dec.: -37.79 mas/yr
Parallax (π)	19.48±0.66 mas
Distance	167 ± 6 ly (51 ± 2 pc)

Orbit
Primary	τ Oph Aa
Secondary	τ Oph Ab
Period (P)	185.243±0.013 days
Eccentricity (e)	0.688±0.055
Periastron epoch (T)	2,446,738.925±1.232
Argument of periastron (ω) (secondary)	51.2±0.7°

Orbit
Primary	τ Oph A
Secondary	τ Oph B
Period (P)	288.18±0.93 years
Semi-major axis (a)	1.53±0.08″
Eccentricity (e)	0.656±0.019
Inclination (i)	63.3±1.5°
Longitude of the node (Ω)	69.0±0.8°
Periastron epoch (T)	1826.69±0.36
Argument of periastron (ω) (secondary)	46±3°

Details
Mass	1.54 (A) / 1.29 (B) M_{☉}
Surface gravity (log g)	4.18 (A) cgs
Temperature	6,813 (A) K

Other designations
- BD−08°4549, CCDM J18031-0811AB, 69 Ophiuchi, HIP 88404, HD 164764+164765, HR 6733+6734, WDS J18031-0811AB

Database references
SIMBAD	data

Tau Ophiuchi (τ Oph) is a multiple star in the constellation Ophiuchus, approximately 167 light years away based on parallax. Its two main components are two yellow-white main sequence stars, A, of magnitude 5.24 and class F2V, and B, of magnitude 5.94 and class F5V, orbiting each other with a period of 257 years and eccentricity around 0.77. A is reported as a spectroscopic binary with a smaller star of 0.29 solar masses orbiting it every 186 days. An additional component, C, has a separation of 100.8" and magnitude 11.28.
