= 58 Ophiuchi =

Star in the constellation Ophiuchus

- Location of 58 Ophiuchi (circled)

Observation data Epoch J2000 Equinox ICRS
- Constellation: Ophiuchus
- Right ascension: 17^{h} 43^{m} 25.79354^{s}
- Declination: −21° 40′ 59.4989″
- Apparent magnitude (V): 4.86

Characteristics
- Evolutionary stage: main sequence
- Spectral type: F5V
- U−B color index: -0.03
- B−V color index: +0.47

Astrometry
Radial velocity (R_{v})	+10.20 km/s
Proper motion (μ)	RA: −97.253 mas/yr Dec.: −44.614 mas/yr
Parallax (π)	58.2437±0.1484 mas
Distance	56.0 ± 0.1 ly (17.17 ± 0.04 pc)
Absolute magnitude (M_{V})	+3.63

Details
Mass	1.20 M_{☉}
Radius	1.43±0.05 R_{☉}
Luminosity	3.02 L_{☉}
Surface gravity (log g)	4.21±0.10 cgs
Temperature	6,305±80 K
Metallicity [Fe/H]	−0.16±0.06 dex
Rotational velocity (v sin i)	12.2±0.7 km/s
Age	2.652 Gyr

Other designations
- 58 Oph, BD−21°4712, FK5 1463, GC 24030, GJ 692, HD 160915, HIP 86736, HR 6595, SAO 185660

Database references
SIMBAD	data

58 Ophiuchi is a single star in the equatorial constellation of Ophiuchus. It is visible to the naked eye as a faint, yellow-white hued star with an apparent visual magnitude of 4.86. This object is 56 light years away based on parallax, and is drifting further from the Earth with a heliocentric radial velocity of +10 km/s.

This is an ordinary F-type main-sequence star with a stellar classification of F5V. It is 2.7 billion years old with a projected rotational velocity of 12 km/s. The star has an estimated 1.2 times the mass of the Sun and 1.43 times the Sun's radius. It is radiating three times the luminosity of the Sun from its photosphere at an effective temperature of 6,305 K.
