= 24 Scorpii =

Star in the constellation Ophiuchus

- Location of 24 Scorpii (circled)

Observation data Epoch J2000 Equinox ICRS
- Constellation: Ophiuchus
- Right ascension: 16^{h} 41^{m} 34.38407^{s}
- Declination: −17° 44′ 31.8047″
- Apparent magnitude (V): 4.91

Characteristics
- Spectral type: G7.5IICN1Ba0.4
- U−B color index: +0.85
- B−V color index: +1.11

Astrometry
Radial velocity (R_{v})	−25.20 km/s
Proper motion (μ)	RA: −21.670 mas/yr Dec.: −1.224 mas/yr
Parallax (π)	8.2914±0.2626 mas
Distance	390 ± 10 ly (121 ± 4 pc)
Absolute magnitude (M_{V})	−0.60

Details
Mass	2.51 M_{☉}
Radius	22 R_{☉}
Luminosity	208 L_{☉}
Surface gravity (log g)	2.15 cgs
Temperature	4,667 K
Metallicity [Fe/H]	−0.13 dex
Rotational velocity (v sin i)	5.3 km/s
Age	692 Myr

Other designations
- 24 Sco, BD−17°4618, FK5 624, GC 22449, GJ 9574, HD 150416, HIP 81724, HR 6196, SAO 160046

Database references
SIMBAD	data

24 Scorpii is a star that was originally placed by John Flamsteed within the constellation of Scorpius but is now placed within the southeastern constellation of Ophiuchus. It is visible to the naked eye as a faint, yellow-hued point of light with an apparent visual magnitude of 4.91. Based on the trigonometric parallax published in Gaia Data Release 2, the star lies approximately 121 parsecs or 390 light years away. It is positioned near the ecliptic and thus is subject to lunar occultations.

This object is a luminous giant star that is classified by spectral and luminosity class as G7.5II or G7.5II-IIICN1Ba0.5. 24 Sco is associated with the faint reflection nebulae RfN VDB 109 or GN 16.36.7, but may just lie along the same line of sight. It is a very mild Barium star, but the enhanced barium lines in the spectrum may be a simple luminosity effect rather than a true abundance anomaly. It is a probable horizontal branch star, fusing helium in its core, with just a 13% likelihood that it is still on the red giant branch. The star has 2.51 times the mass of the Sun and has expanded to 22 times the Sun's radius. It is radiating 208 times the Sun's luminosity from its photosphere at an effective temperature of 4,667 K.

In John Flamsteed’s Atlas Coelestis and Johann Bode’s Uranographia, this star was designated as m Scorpii. When the constellation borders were set in 1930, it was moved to Ophiuchus, so the designation has been dropped.
