= Omega Ophiuchi =

Star in the constellation Ophiuchus

- Location of ω Ophiuchi (circled)

Observation data Epoch J2000 Equinox ICRS
- Constellation: Ophiuchus
- Right ascension: 16^{h} 32^{m} 08.19983^{s}
- Declination: −21° 27′ 59.0120″
- Apparent magnitude (V): 4.44 – 4.51

Characteristics
- Evolutionary stage: main sequence
- Spectral type: ApSrEuCr or A2 VpSrCrEu Ksn
- U−B color index: +0.13
- B−V color index: +0.130±0.002
- Variable type: α^{2} CVn

Astrometry
Radial velocity (R_{v})	+2.5±0.7 km/s
Proper motion (μ)	RA: +21.12 mas/yr Dec.: +35.26 mas/yr
Parallax (π)	19.34±0.21 mas
Distance	169 ± 2 ly (51.7 ± 0.6 pc)
Absolute magnitude (M_{V})	0.88

Details
Mass	2.25+0.13 −0.35 M_{☉}
Radius	2.97±0.19 R_{☉}
Luminosity	34.7±1.6 L_{☉}
Surface gravity (log g)	3.85+0.65 −0.69 cgs
Temperature	8,150±250 K
Metallicity [Fe/H]	−0.47 dex
Rotation	2.3205±0.0002 days
Rotational velocity (v sin i)	32.2±1.4 km/s
Age	860+150 −110 Myr

Other designations
- ω Oph, 9 Ophiuchi, BD−21°4381, FK5 3307, GC 22221, HD 148898, HIP 80975, HR 6153, SAO 184450

Database references
SIMBAD	data

Omega Ophiuchi, which is Latinized from ω Ophiuchi, is a variable star in the equatorial constellation of Ophiuchus, located just to the north of the ecliptic near the western constellation border with Scorpius. It is a white-hued star that is faintly visible to the naked eye with an apparent visual magnitude that fluctuates around 4.45. Parallax measurements indicate it lies at a distance of about 168.6 light years from the Sun. It is drifting further away with a radial velocity of +2.5 km/s.

This is an Ap star with a stellar classification of ApSrEuCr, displaying strong abundance anomalies of the elements strontium, europium, and chromium. Abt and Morrell (1995) found a class of A2 Vp(SrCrEu Ksn), showing further an A-type main-sequence star with a Ca II line (singly-ionized calcium) having both sharp and broad components. It is an Alpha^{2} Canum Venaticorum variable, with its brightness ranging from magnitude 4.44 down to 4.51 over a period of 2.99 days. A strong magnetic field has been measured on the surface.

Omega Ophiuchi is around 860 million years old with a projected rotational velocity of 32.2 km/s and a rotation period of 2.3 days. It has 2.3 times the mass of the Sun and 3.0 times the Sun's radius. The star is radiating 35 times the luminosity of the Sun from its photosphere at an effective temperature of 8,150 K. It is a source of X-ray emission.

On 9 December 2017, it was occulted by Venus as viewed from the South Atlantic.

This star has a significant change in its proper motion measurements over time, suggesting it may be an astrometric binary. The proposed companion is probably a compact star such as a white dwarf.
