= 30 Ophiuchi =

Star in the constellation Ophiuchus

- Location of 30 Ophiuchi (circled)

Observation data Epoch J2000 Equinox ICRS
- Constellation: Ophiuchus
- Right ascension: 17^{h} 01^{m} 03.60142^{s}
- Declination: −04° 13′ 21.5308″
- Apparent magnitude (V): 4.82

Characteristics
- Spectral type: K4III
- U−B color index: +1.80
- B−V color index: +1.48
- Variable type: none

Astrometry
Radial velocity (R_{v})	−6.70 km/s
Proper motion (μ)	RA: −39.13 mas/yr Dec.: −78.09 mas/yr
Parallax (π)	9.3138±0.1676 mas
Distance	350 ± 6 ly (107 ± 2 pc)
Absolute magnitude (M_{V})	−0.65

Details
Radius	35.89+0.54 −2.12 R_{☉}
Luminosity	299.8±6.2 L_{☉}
Surface gravity (log g)	1.73 cgs
Temperature	4,009.00+126.67 −29.67 K
Metallicity [Fe/H]	−0.03 dex
Rotational velocity (v sin i)	1.4 km/s

Other designations
- 30 Oph, NSV 8111, BD−04°4215, FK5 1445, GC 22937, HD 153687, HIP 83262, HR 6318, SAO 141483, CCDM J17011-0413A, WDS J17011-0413A

Database references
SIMBAD	data

30 Ophiuchi is a single star in the equatorial constellation of Ophiuchus, and figures 0.99° east (specifically E½S) of the heart of cluster Messier 10. It is visible to the naked eye as a faint, orange-hued point of light with an apparent visual magnitude of 4.82. The distance to this star is approximately 350 light years based on parallax. Its present motion is, net, one of approaching rather than parting, at −6.7 km/s, its "radial velocity".

This is an aging giant star with a stellar classification of K4III, having exhausted the supply of hydrogen at its core and expanded to 36 times the Sun's radius. The star is radiating 300 times the luminosity of the Sun from its swollen photosphere at an effective temperature of 4,009 K. It is emitting a far infrared excess due to circumstellar dust, which extends out to a diameter of 240 AU and has a mass of 62×10^{25} g.

The primary presents with two visual companions: B, at magnitude 9.71 and separation 99.8″, and C, at magnitude 8.75 and separation 220.9″ (3′ 40.9″).
