= 53 Ophiuchi =

Star system in the constellation Ophiuchus

Observation data Epoch J2000 Equinox ICRS
- Constellation: Ophiuchus
- Right ascension: 17^{h} 34^{m} 36.69409^{s}
- Declination: +09° 35′ 12.1005″
- Apparent magnitude (V): 5.80 (5.82 + 7.8)

Characteristics
- Spectral type: A2 V + A8 IV

Astrometry

53 Oph A
Radial velocity (R_{v})	−13.9±2.9 km/s
Proper motion (μ)	RA: +2.126 mas/yr Dec.: −8.530 mas/yr
Parallax (π)	8.8060±0.0978 mas
Distance	370 ± 4 ly (114 ± 1 pc)

53 Oph B
Proper motion (μ)	RA: +1.794 mas/yr Dec.: −8.148 mas/yr
Parallax (π)	8.8979±0.0413 mas
Distance	367 ± 2 ly (112.4 ± 0.5 pc)

Details

53 Oph Aa
Mass	2.50±0.05 M_{☉}
Radius	1.7 R_{☉}
Luminosity	56.4+5.3 −4.9 L_{☉}
Surface gravity (log g)	3.90 cgs
Temperature	9,311+173 −170 K
Metallicity [Fe/H]	0.21 dex
Rotational velocity (v sin i)	29 km/s

53 Oph B
Radius	1.72+0.06 −0.03 R_{☉}
Luminosity	7.74±0.05 L_{☉}
Temperature	7,344+124 −152 K
Rotational velocity (v sin i)	140 km/s

Other designations
- f Oph, 53 Oph, HD 159480, HIP 85998, HR 6548, WDS J17346+0935
- 53 Oph A: BD+09°3424, GC 23824, SAO 122526
- 53 Oph B: BD+09°3423, GC 23823, SAO 122525

Database references
SIMBAD	data

53 Ophiuchi is a multiple star system in the equatorial constellation of Ophiuchus. It is visible to the naked eye as a faint star with a combined apparent visual magnitude of 5.80. Located around 370 light years distant from the Sun based on parallax, it is moving closer to the Earth with a heliocentric radial velocity of −14 km/s. As of 2011, the visible components had an angular separation of 41.28″ along a position angle of 190°. The primary may itself be a close binary system with a separation of 0.3692″ and a magnitude difference of 3.97 at an infrared wavelength of 562 nm.

The magnitude 5.82 primary, designated component Aa, is an A-type main-sequence star with a stellar classification of A2 V. It has 2.5 times the mass of the Sun and about 1.7 times the Sun's radius. The star is radiating 56 times the Sun's luminosity from its photosphere at an effective temperature of 9,311 K. The widely spaced secondary, designated component B, is a magnitude 7.8 A-type subgiant star with a class of A8 IV.
