= 20 Ophiuchi =

Star in the constellation Ophiuchus

- Location of 20 Ophiuchi (circled)

Observation data Epoch J2000 Equinox ICRS
- Constellation: Ophiuchus
- Right ascension: 16^{h} 49^{m} 50.01604^{s}
- Declination: −10° 46′ 58.7775″
- Apparent magnitude (V): 4.64

Characteristics
- Spectral type: F6IV
- U−B color index: +0.07
- B−V color index: +0.47

Astrometry
Radial velocity (R_{v})	−1.60 km/s
Proper motion (μ)	RA: +72.33 mas/yr Dec.: −78.80 mas/yr
Parallax (π)	31.27±2.16 mas
Distance	104 ± 7 ly (32 ± 2 pc)
Absolute magnitude (M_{V})	2.13

Orbit
Period (P)	35.5 ± 1.5 yr
Semi-major axis (a)	0.460 ± 0.030″
Eccentricity (e)	0.8 ± 0.2
Inclination (i)	74 ± 11°
Longitude of the node (Ω)	118 ± 9°
Periastron epoch (T)	1981.2 ± 1.7
Argument of periastron (ω) (secondary)	34 ± 26°

Details

20 Oph A
Mass	1.70 M_{☉}
Radius	3.0 R_{☉}
Luminosity	12.06 L_{☉}
Surface gravity (log g)	3.89 cgs
Temperature	6,417 K
Metallicity [Fe/H]	+0.13 dex
Rotational velocity (v sin i)	11.3 km/s

20 Oph B
Mass	0.8 ± 0.2 M_{☉}

Other designations
- BD−10°4394, FK5 1438, GC 22643, HIP 82369, HR 6243, HD 151769, SAO 160118

Database references
SIMBAD	data

20 Ophiuchi is a class F6IV (yellow-white subgiant) star in the constellation Ophiuchus. Its apparent magnitude is 4.64 and it is approximately 104 light years away based on parallax. It lies near the star Zeta Ophiuchi.

20 Ophiuchi is an astrometric binary. The primary star is a late F-type subgiant star. It has a mass 1.72 times that of the Sun. The companion star regularly perturbs the primary star, causing it to wobble around the barycenter. From this, an orbital period of 35.5 years has been calculated. The secondary star is 0.8 times the mass of the Sun, and it may be a white dwarf or red dwarf.
