= Kappa Ophiuchi =

Star in the constellation Ophiuchus

- Location of κ Ophiuchi (circled)

Observation data Epoch J2000 Equinox ICRS
- Constellation: Ophiuchus
- Right ascension: 16^{h} 57^{m} 40.09785^{s}
- Declination: +09° 22′ 30.1126″
- Apparent magnitude (V): 3.20

Characteristics
- Evolutionary stage: red clump
- Spectral type: K2 III
- U−B color index: +1.16
- B−V color index: +1.16

Astrometry
Radial velocity (R_{v})	−55.85±0.10 km/s
Proper motion (μ)	RA: −292.13 mas/yr Dec.: −10.38 mas/yr
Parallax (π)	35.66±0.20 mas
Distance	91.5 ± 0.5 ly (28.0 ± 0.2 pc)
Absolute magnitude (M_{V})	+0.964

Details
Mass	1.19±0.14 M_{☉}
Radius	11.02±0.07 R_{☉}
Luminosity	50.67±1.14 L_{☉}
Surface gravity (log g)	2.49±0.07 cgs
Temperature	4,449±68 K
Metallicity [Fe/H]	+0.02±0.03 dex
Rotational velocity (v sin i)	4.7 km/s
Age	4.92 Gyr

Other designations
- κ Oph, 27 Ophiuchi, BD+09 3298, HD 153210, HIP 83000, HR 6299, SAO 121962

Database references
SIMBAD	data

Kappa Ophiuchi, Latinized from κ Ophiuchi, is a star in the equatorial constellation Ophiuchus. It is a suspected variable star with an average apparent visual magnitude of 3.20, making it visible to the naked eye and one of the brighter members of this constellation. Based upon parallax measurements made during the Hipparcos mission, it is situated at a distance of around 91.5 light-years (28.1 parsecs) from Earth. The overall brightness of the star is diminished by 0.11 magnitudes due to extinction from intervening matter along the line of sight.

The spectrum of this star matches a stellar classification of K2 III, with the luminosity class of 'III' indicating this is a giant star that has exhausted the hydrogen at its core and evolved away from the main sequence of stars like the Sun. Since 1943, the spectrum of this star has served as one of the stable anchor points by which other stars are classified. It is 19% more massive than the Sun, but the outer envelope has expanded to around 11 times the Sun's radius. With its enlarged size, it is radiating 51 times the luminosity of the Sun from its outer atmosphere at an effective temperature of 4,449 K. This is cooler than the Sun's surface and gives Kappa Ophiuchi the orange-hued glow of a K-type star.

Although designated as a variable star, observations with the Hipparcos satellite showed a variation of no more than 0.02 in magnitude. In designating this as a suspected variable star, it is possible that Kappa Ophiuchi was mistaken for Chi Ophiuchi, which is a variable star. Kappa Ophiuchi belongs to an evolutionary branch known as the red clump, making it a clump giant. The surface abundance of elements other than hydrogen and helium, what astronomers term the star's metallicity, is similar to the abundances of those elements in the Sun.
