= List of stars in Sculptor =

This is the list of notable stars in the constellation Sculptor, sorted by decreasing brightness.

Name	B	Var	HD	HIP	RA	Dec	vis. mag.	abs. mag.	Dist. (ly)	Sp. class	Notes
α Scl	α		5737	4577	00^{h} 58^{m} 36.35^{s}	−29° 21′ 26.9″	4.30	−2.27	672	B7IIIp	SX Ari variable
β Scl	β		221507	116231	23^{h} 32^{m} 58.19^{s}	−37° 49′ 06.1″	4.38	0.69	178	B9.5IVMNpe.	suspected α^{2} CVn variable, V_{max} = 4.35^{m}, V_{min} = 4.39^{m}
γ Scl	γ		219784	115102	23^{h} 18^{m} 49.43^{s}	−32° 31′ 54.6″	4.41	0.72	179	K1III	variable star, ΔV = 0.004^{m}, P = 0.10 d
δ Scl	δ		223352	117452	23^{h} 48^{m} 55.48^{s}	−28° 07′ 48.1″	4.59	1.37	143	A0V	
η Scl	η		2429	2210	00^{h} 27^{m} 55.71^{s}	−33° 00′ 25.4″	4.86	−1.27	548	M2/M3III	semiregular variable, V_{max} = 4.8^{m}, V_{min} = 4.9^{m}
ζ Scl	ζ		224990	183	00^{h} 02^{m} 19.91^{s}	−29° 43′ 13.6″	5.04	−0.93	509	B4V	
ι Scl	ι		1737	1708	00^{h} 21^{m} 31.18^{s}	−28° 58′ 52.7″	5.18	0.29	310	K0III	
θ Scl	θ		739	950	00^{h} 11^{m} 43.89^{s}	−35° 08′ 00.2″	5.24	3.55	71	F3/F5V	
π Scl	π		10537	7955	01^{h} 42^{m} 08.65^{s}	−32° 19′ 36.7″	5.25	1.13	217	K1II/III	
ε Scl	ε		10830	8209	01^{h} 45^{m} 38.65^{s}	−25° 03′ 08.8″	5.29	3.10	89	F2IV	suspected variable
μ Scl	μ		222433	116820	23^{h} 40^{m} 38.21^{s}	−32° 04′ 22.8″	5.30	0.55	291	K0III	suspected variable, V_{max} = 5.30^{m}, V_{min} = 5.33^{m}
κ^{2} Scl	κ^{2}		720	930	00^{h} 11^{m} 34.42^{s}	−27° 47′ 59.2″	5.41	−0.85	581	K2III	
κ^{1} Scl	κ^{1}		493	761	00^{h} 09^{m} 21.02^{s}	−27° 59′ 16.5″	5.42	1.24	224	F3V	
HD 9525	(γ)		9525	7213	01^{h} 32^{m} 56.05^{s}	−36° 51′ 54.7″	5.49	0.94	265	K1/K2III	
σ Scl	σ		6178	4852	01^{h} 02^{m} 26.38^{s}	−31° 33′ 07.4″	5.50	1.29	227	A1/A2IV	α^{2} CVn variable
HD 3059			3059	2661	00^{h} 33^{m} 41.06^{s}	−29° 33′ 29.5″	5.55	−0.37	497	K1III	
ξ Scl	ξ		6055	4770	01^{h} 01^{m} 18.23^{s}	−38° 54′ 59.9″	5.59	−0.83	628	K1III	
BU Scl		BU	224630	118277	23^{h} 59^{m} 27.90^{s}	−29° 29′ 06.6″	5.59	−1.56	879	K5III	slow irregular variable
HD 218434			218434	114254	23^{h} 08^{m} 21.10^{s}	−28° 49′ 24.8″	5.60	0.89	285	G8III	
HD 220096			220096	115312	23^{h} 21^{m} 15.51^{s}	−26° 59′ 12.3″	5.65	0.63	329	G5IV	suspected variable
HD 1187			1187	1288	00^{h} 16^{m} 08.79^{s}	−31° 26′ 46.8″	5.66	0.08	427	K2III	
HD 344	ε		344	655	00^{h} 08^{m} 03.52^{s}	−33° 31′ 45.6″	5.67	0.67	325	K1III	
τ Scl	τ		9906	7463	01^{h} 36^{m} 08.43^{s}	−29° 54′ 26.8″	5.69	1.73	202	F2V	
HD 10538	(δ)		10538	7941	01^{h} 42^{m} 03.02^{s}	−36° 49′ 56.2″	5.70	0.85	304	A0V	
R Scl		R	8879	6759	01^{h} 26^{m} 58.10^{s}	−32° 32′ 35.2″	5.72		1545	C	semiregular variable
HD 9377			9377	7118	01^{h} 31^{m} 43.25^{s}	−30° 16′ 58.5″	5.79	0.95	304	K0III	
HD 8498			8498	6502	01^{h} 23^{m} 30.97^{s}	−30° 56′ 43.8″	5.84	−1.34	888	M0III	variable star, ΔV = 0.009^{m}, P = 10.62 d
HD 218619			218619	114366	23^{h} 09^{m} 44.62^{s}	−28° 05′ 18.9″	5.88	−0.73	685	K2III	
λ^{2} Scl	λ^{2}		4211	3456	00^{h} 44^{m} 11.92^{s}	−38° 25′ 19.1″	5.90	0.61	372	K1III	
HD 9228			9228	7016	01^{h} 30^{m} 22.88^{s}	−26° 12′ 28.3″	5.92	0.25	444	K2III	
HD 942			942	1096	00^{h} 13^{m} 42.22^{s}	−26° 01′ 19.8″	5.94	−1.52	1012	K5III	suspected variable, V_{max} = 5.93^{m}, V_{min} = 5.96^{m}
HD 10142			10142	7643	01^{h} 38^{m} 27.49^{s}	−36° 31′ 40.6″	5.94	0.96	323	K0III	
AI Scl		AI	7312	5661	01^{h} 12^{m} 45.37^{s}	−37° 51′ 23.1″	5.95	1.62	239	A9IV: (+F/G)	δ Sct variable, V_{max} = 5.89^{m}, V_{min} = 5.98^{m}
HD 2363			2363	2159	00^{h} 27^{m} 14.69^{s}	−25° 32′ 49.7″	5.99	−0.58	671	K0III	
λ^{1} Scl	λ^{1}		4065	3356	00^{h} 42^{m} 42.89^{s}	−38° 27′ 48.5″	6.05	0.44	432	B9.5V	
AL Scl		AL	224113	117931	23^{h} 55^{m} 16.57^{s}	−31° 55′ 17.3″	6.09	−1.41	1032	B6/B7	Algol variable, V_{max} = 6.06^{m}, V_{min} = 6.33^{m}, P = 2.45 d
HD 5445			5445	4363	00^{h} 55^{m} 55.53^{s}	−27° 46′ 33.0″	6.11	−2.67	1863	M1/M2III	variable star, ΔV = 0.014^{m}, P = 1.08 d
HD 9742			9742	7361	01^{h} 34^{m} 50.83^{s}	−31° 53′ 32.0″	6.11	0.85	368	K0/K1III	suspected variable
HD 943			943	1099	00^{h} 13^{m} 44.38^{s}	−26° 17′ 05.9″	6.14	−0.73	771	K4III	
HD 1089			1089	1195	00^{h} 14^{m} 58.21^{s}	−34° 54′ 15.1″	6.17	−0.61	739	K3III	
HD 10481	(ε)		10481	7886	01^{h} 41^{m} 27.28^{s}	−38° 07′ 58.7″	6.20	3.09	137	F3/F5IV/V	
S Scl		S	1115	1236	00^{h} 15^{m} 22.27^{s}	−32° 02′ 43.0″	6.20		1100	M7/M8IIIe	Mira variable, V_{max} = 5.5^{m}, V_{min} = 13.6^{m}, P = 367 d
HD 222872			222872	117107	23^{h} 44^{m} 29.10^{s}	−26° 14′ 47.7″	6.23	2.07	222	F3/F5V	
HD 219580			219580	114969	23^{h} 17^{m} 08.73^{s}	−28° 26′ 16.9″	6.24	−0.99	911	M1/M2III	suspected variable
HD 224350			224350	118076	23^{h} 57^{m} 08.12^{s}	−26° 37′ 24.6″	6.26	−1.62	1226	K3III	suspected variable
HD 6269			6269	4932	01^{h} 03^{m} 17.76^{s}	−29° 31′ 32.8″	6.28	1.03	365	G8IIICN...	
HD 220929	σ		220929	115833	23^{h} 28^{m} 00.69^{s}	−35° 32′ 40.2″	6.34	−0.14	644	K2III	
HD 223991			223991	117860	23^{h} 54^{m} 21.39^{s}	−27° 02′ 34.5″	6.34	1.51	301	A2V+...	
HD 219912			219912	115178	23^{h} 19^{m} 43.12^{s}	−33° 42′ 28.7″	6.35	0.13	572	K2III	
HD 9151			9151	6971	01^{h} 29^{m} 42.79^{s}	−25° 37′ 04.0″	6.37	0.09	588	K1III	
HD 225200			225200	345	00^{h} 04^{m} 20.30^{s}	−29° 16′ 07.8″	6.38	0.83	421	A1V	
HD 3074			3074	2663	00^{h} 33^{m} 43.85^{s}	−35° 00′ 03.0″	6.41	3.62	118	F8/G0V	
HD 3605			3605	3056	00^{h} 38^{m} 48.75^{s}	−25° 06′ 28.0″	6.43	−0.32	729	K4III	
HD 6403			6403	5042	01^{h} 04^{m} 32.61^{s}	−33° 31′ 58.0″	6.44	0.44	517	K0III	
HD 223466			223466	117510	23^{h} 49^{m} 49.61^{s}	−25° 19′ 52.6″	6.44	1.02	396	A3V	
HD 219823			219823	115121	23^{h} 19^{m} 03.28^{s}	−28° 23′ 16.3″	6.49	−0.31	748	K5III	
AV Scl		AV	1909	1830	00^{h} 23^{m} 12.61^{s}	−31° 02′ 08.8″	6.56		563	B9IVmn	α^{2} CVn variable
HD 6619		AW	6619	5193	01^{h} 06^{m} 26.58^{s}	−35° 39′ 38.4″	6.61		494	A1V	α^{2} CVn variable
Z Scl		Z	3735	3142	00^{h} 39^{m} 57.82^{s}	−33° 57′ 41.2″	6.69		130.9	F8V	suspected variable
HD 9770		BB	9770	7372	01^{h} 35^{m} 01.04^{s}	−29° 54′ 37.0″	7.10		70.50	K1V+M2V	eclipsing binary, V_{max} = 7.1^{m}, V_{min} = 7.17^{m}, P = 0.48 d
HD 4208			4208	3479	00^{h} 44^{m} 26.65^{s}	−26° 30′ 56.4″	7.79	5.22	107	G7V	Cocibolca, has a planet (b)
HD 4113			4113	3391	00^{h} 49^{m} 12.60^{s}	−37° 58′ 57.5″	7.91	4.69	144	G5V	has a planet (b)
HD 9578			9578	7240	01^{h} 33^{m} 17.14^{s}	−38° 14′ 42.1″	8.20	4.41	187	G1V	has a planet (b)
HD 6532		AP	6532	5150	01^{h} 05^{m} 55.70^{s}	−26° 43′ 44.0″	8.40		531	A5p	rapidly oscillating Ap star
Gliese 1			225213	439	00^{h} 05^{m} 24.43^{s}	−37° 21′ 26.5″	8.63		14.148	M1.5	suspected BY Dra variable, ΔV = 0.02^{m}
HD 1097		AU	1097	1210	00^{h} 15^{m} 07.97^{s}	−29° 00′ 23.0″	9.05		1150	A4mF4Sr	δ Sct variable
WASP-8					23^{h} 59^{m} 36.07^{s}	−35° 01′ 52.9″	9.89	6.45	159	G6	has a transiting planet (b)
RT Scl		RT			00^{h} 36^{m} 28.09^{s}	−25° 40′ 22.9″	10.31			A5N+F3	β Lyr variable, V_{max} = 10.18^{m}, V_{min} = 10.89^{m}, P = 0.51 d
WASP-173 A					23^{h} 36^{m} 40.0^{s}	−34° 36′ 41″	11.3			G3	has a transiting planet (b)
CD -38 245				3635	00^{h} 46^{m} 36.19^{s}	−37° 39′ 33.6″	12.00			K1Ivw	very metal-poor star
WASP-45					00^{h} 20^{m} 57.00^{s}	−35° 59′ 53.8″	12.00			K2V	has a transiting planet (b)
SY Scl		SY			00^{h} 07^{m} 36.25^{s}	−25° 29′ 39.9″	12.15			M8:	Mira variable, V_{max} = 10.4^{m}, V_{min} = <14.6^{m}, P = 411 d
VY Scl		VY			23^{h} 29^{m} 00.48^{s}	−29° 46′ 45.9″				O...	prototype VY Scl star
GD 659					00^{h} 53^{m} 17.44^{s}	−32° 59′ 56.6″	13.36			DA1.4	white dwarf
BX Scl		BX			23^{h} 43^{m} 54.45^{s}	−28° 18′ 34.5″	13.56			A	SX Phe variable, V_{max} = 13.42^{m}, V_{min} = 13.71^{m}, P = 0.037 d
WD 0137-349					01^{h} 39^{m} 42.85^{s}	−34° 42′ 39.3″	15.33			DA	white dwarf, has a brown dwarf companion
VZ Scl		VZ			23^{h} 50^{m} 09.25^{s}	−26° 22′ 52.7″	15.6			B9IVmn	VY Scl variable and eclipsing binary, V_{max} = 15.6^{m}, V_{min} = 18.4^{m}, P = 0.14 d
BW Scl		BW			23^{h} 53^{m} 00.86^{s}	−38° 51′ 46.6″	16.20			CV	WZ Sge variable and ZZ Cet variable, V_{max} = 8.9^{m}, V_{min} = 17.2^{m}, P = 0.054 d
Table legend: • Name = Proper name • B = Bayer designation • F or/and G. = Flamsteed designation or Gould designation • Var = Variable-star designation • HD = Henry Draper Catalogue designation number • HIP = Hipparcos Catalogue designation number • RA = Right ascension for the Epoch/Equinox J2000.0 • Dec = Declination for the Epoch/Equinox J2000.0 • vis. mag. = visual magnitude (m or m_{v}), also known as apparent magnitude • abs. mag. = absolute magnitude (M_{v}) • Dist. (ly) = Distance in light-years from Earth • Sp. class = Spectral class of the star in the stellar classification system • Notes = Common name(s) or alternate name(s); comments; notable properties [for example: multiple star status, range of variability if it is a variable star, exoplanets, etc.]

== See also ==
- List of stars by constellation
