= Lambda Sculptoris =

The Bayer designation Lambda Sculptoris (λ Scl, λ Sculptoris) is shared by two star systems, λ^{1} Sculptoris and λ^{2} Sculptoris, in the constellation Sculptor. They are separated by 0.29° on the sky.

- λ^{1} Sculptoris
- λ^{2} Sculptoris
