= HR24 =

HR24 or HR 24 may refer to:

- HR 24 (Kappa^{1} Sculptoris), the star Kappa Sculptoris
- HR-24 Sirsa, a Regional Transport Office district in India
- HR24, a DirecTV HD-DVR Receiver model
- 2001 HR24, a main-belt asteroid officially named 51599 Brittany and discovered on April 28, 2001
- New Hampshire House Resolution 24 (2008), a resolution for the impeachment of George W. Bush
- HR24, Harwich Runners 24 Hour Race

== See also ==
- HR (disambiguation)
- 24 (disambiguation)
