= Kappa Sculptoris =

The Bayer designation Kappa Sculptoris (κ Scl, κ Sculptoris) is shared by two star systems, κ¹ Sculptoris and κ² Sculptoris, in the constellation Sculptor. They are separated by 0.53° in the sky.

- κ^{1} Sculptoris (HR 24), binary containing two F-type giants
- κ^{2} Sculptoris (HR 34), K-type giant
