= Tau Sculptoris =

Star in the constellation Sculptor

Observation data Epoch J2000.0 Equinox J2000.0 (ICRS)
- Constellation: Sculptor
- Right ascension: 01^{h} 36^{m} 08.50799^{s}
- Declination: −29° 54′ 26.3540″
- Apparent magnitude (V): +5.69 (6.06 + 7.35)

Characteristics
- Spectral type: F2 V
- B−V color index: +0.33

Astrometry
Radial velocity (R_{v})	+3.00±4.50 km/s
Proper motion (μ)	RA: +117.37 mas/yr Dec.: +46.72 mas/yr
Parallax (π)	14.42±0.81 mas
Distance	230 ± 10 ly (69 ± 4 pc)
Absolute magnitude (M_{V})	2.04 + 3.02

Orbit
Period (P)	1503.58±35.32 yr
Semi-major axis (a)	3.155±0.132″
Eccentricity (e)	0.604±0.019
Inclination (i)	55.6±0.8°
Longitude of the node (Ω)	69.6±0.8°
Periastron epoch (T)	2039.79±33.80
Argument of periastron (ω) (secondary)	140.2±2.8°

Details

τ Scl A
Mass	1.56 M_{☉}
Radius	2.3 R_{☉}
Luminosity	11.1 L_{☉}
Surface gravity (log g)	3.96±0.14 cgs
Temperature	7,155±243 K
Metallicity [Fe/H]	−0.12 dex
Rotational velocity (v sin i)	73.8±7.8 km/s
Age	1.284 Gyr

τ Scl B
Mass	1.37 M_{☉}

Other designations
- τ Scl, CD−30°540, HD 9906, HIP 7463, HR 462, SAO 193201, WDS J01361-2954

Database references
SIMBAD	data

Tau Sculptoris (τ Scl, τ Sculptoris) is a binary star system in the southern constellation of Sculptor, about 8° to the east-southeast of Alpha Sculptoris. It is faintly visible to the naked eye with a combined apparent visual magnitude of +5.69. Based upon an annual parallax shift of 14.42 mas as seen from Earth, it is located around 230 light years from the Sun.

The binary nature of this system was discovered by English astronomer John Herschel in 1835. The current orbital elements are based upon a fraction of a single orbit, as the estimated orbital period is around 1,503 years. The system has a semimajor axis of 3.2 arc seconds and an eccentricity of 0.6. The primary member, component A, is a yellow-white hued F-type main sequence star with an apparent magnitude of +6.06 and a stellar classification of F2 V. The companion, component B, is a magnitude 7.35 star.

The designation Tau Sculptoris hasn't always been allocated to this star. It was given this designation by Lacaille when he created Sculptor. When Bode created his own constellation Machina Electrica, he took about half of Sculptor and parts of Fornax, including this star, which he designated Iota Machinae Electricae. Bode used Tau Sculptoris for HD 224914 instead, which is currently in Phoenix. After Machina Electrica was deemed obsolete by the IAU, the stars were returned to their original constellations.
