= Pi Sculptoris =

Star in the constellation Sculptor

- Location of π Sculptoris (circled)

Observation data Epoch J2000 Equinox ICRS
- Constellation: Sculptor
- Right ascension: 01^{h} 42^{m} 08.62230^{s}
- Declination: −32° 19′ 37.2862″
- Apparent magnitude (V): 5.25

Characteristics
- Evolutionary stage: horizontal branch
- Spectral type: K1II/III
- U−B color index: +0.79
- B−V color index: +1.05

Astrometry
Radial velocity (R_{v})	+13.83±0.15 km/s
Proper motion (μ)	RA: −76.714 mas/yr Dec.: +4.521 mas/yr
Parallax (π)	15.0534±0.1667 mas
Distance	217 ± 2 ly (66.4 ± 0.7 pc)
Absolute magnitude (M_{V})	1.16

Details
Mass	1.52 M_{☉}
Radius	9.28+0.30 −2.31 R_{☉}
Luminosity	41.173±0.53 L_{☉}
Surface gravity (log g)	2.69 cgs
Temperature	4,800+737 −75 K
Metallicity [Fe/H]	−0.22 dex
Rotational velocity (v sin i)	< 1.6 km/s

Other designations
- π Scl, CPD−32°4292, FK5 1048, GC 2085, HD 10537, HIP 7955, HR 497, SAO 193263, GSC 07003-02207

Database references
SIMBAD	data

π Sculptoris, Latinized as Pi Sculptoris, is candidate astrometric binary star system in the southern constellation Sculptor, positioned near the eastern constellation border with Fornax. It has an orange hue and is dimly visible to the naked eye with an apparent visual magnitude of 5.25. Based upon parallax measurements, the system is located at a distance of 66 light years from the Sun, and is drifting further away with a radial velocity of +14 km/s.

The visible component is an aging giant/bright giant star with a stellar classification of K1II/III. It is a red clump giant, which indicates it is on the horizontal branch and is generating energy through core helium fusion. The star has 1.5 times the mass of the Sun and 9.3 times the Sun's radius. It is radiating 41 times the luminosity of the Sun from its swollen photosphere at an effective temperature of 4,800 K.

The designation Pi Sculptoris hasn’t always been allocated to this star. It was given this designation by Lacaille when he created Sculptor. When Bode created his own constellation Machina Electrica, he took about half of Sculptor and parts of Fornax, including this star, which he designated Mu Machinae Electricae. Bode used Pi Sculptoris for HD 2490 (HR 109) instead, which is currently in Phoenix. After Machina Electrica was deemed obsolete by the IAU, the stars were returned to their original constellations.
