= Epsilon Sculptoris =

Binary star system in the constellation Sculptor

ε Sculptoris
- Location of ε Sculptoris (circled)

Observation data Epoch J2000 Equinox ICRS
- Constellation: Sculptor
- Right ascension: 01^{h} 45^{m} 38.75712^{s}
- Declination: −25° 03′ 09.4022″
- Apparent magnitude (V): 5.29

Characteristics

A
- Evolutionary stage: main sequence
- Spectral type: F2V
- U−B color index: +0.01
- B−V color index: +0.40

B
- Evolutionary stage: main sequence
- Spectral type: G9V

Astrometry
Radial velocity (R_{v})	+13.10 km/s
Absolute magnitude (M_{V})	+3.05

A
Proper motion (μ)	RA: +165.847 mas/yr Dec.: −49.654 mas/yr
Parallax (π)	35.6418±0.0719 mas
Distance	91.5 ± 0.2 ly (28.06 ± 0.06 pc)

B
Proper motion (μ)	RA: +138.593 mas/yr Dec.: −44.200 mas/yr
Parallax (π)	35.7514±0.0313 mas
Distance	91.23 ± 0.08 ly (27.97 ± 0.02 pc)

Orbit
Period (P)	2,198.3 yr
Semi-major axis (a)	17.06″
Eccentricity (e)	0.857
Inclination (i)	105.3°

Details

ε Scl A
Mass	1.44 M_{☉}
Radius	1.5 R_{☉}
Luminosity	5.07 L_{☉}
Surface gravity (log g)	4.24 cgs
Temperature	6,809 K
Metallicity [Fe/H]	−0.02 dex
Rotational velocity (v sin i)	86 km/s
Age	1.6 Gyr

ε Scl B
Mass	0.84 M_{☉}
Radius	0.74 R_{☉}
Luminosity	0.30 L_{☉}
Surface gravity (log g)	4.62 cgs
Temperature	4,973 K

Other designations
- ADS 1394, CCDM J01456-2504AB, CD−25°704, FK5 61, GC 2145, HD 10830, HIP 8209, HR 514, SAO 167275, WDS J01456-2503AB

Database references
SIMBAD	data

Epsilon Sculptoris (ε Scl, ε Sculptoris) is a binary star in the constellation Sculptor. It is 91 light years from Earth and has a combined apparent magnitude of +5.29.

The primary component, Epsilon Sculptoris A, is a yellow-white F-type main-sequence star with an apparent magnitude of +5.34. Orbiting it with a separation of 4.6 arcseconds, or at least 125 astronomical units, is Epsilon Sculptoris B, a yellow G-type main sequence dwarf with an apparent magnitude of +8.50. A and B make one orbit around their centre of mass once every 1200 years.

There are two optical companions, the 15th magnitude designated Epsilon Sculptoris C at an angular separation of 15 arcseconds and the 11th magnitude Epsilon Sculptoris D, at a separation of 142 arcseconds. Both these faint stars have small Gaia parallaxes indicating a much greater distance than the Epsilon Sculptoris pair.

The designation Epsilon Sculptoris hasn’t always been allocated to this star. It was given this designation by Lacaille when he created Sculptor. When Bode created his own constellation Machina Electrica, he took about half of Sculptor and parts of Fornax, including this star, which he designated Alpha Machinae Electricae, though the star Nu Fornacis was the brightest star. Bode used Epsilon Sculptoris for HD 344 (HR 13) instead. After Machina Electrica was deemed obsolete by the IAU, the stars were returned to their original constellations.

This star will be in the constellation Fornax around 2920 CE.
