= Sigma Sculptoris =

Binary star in the constellation Sculptor

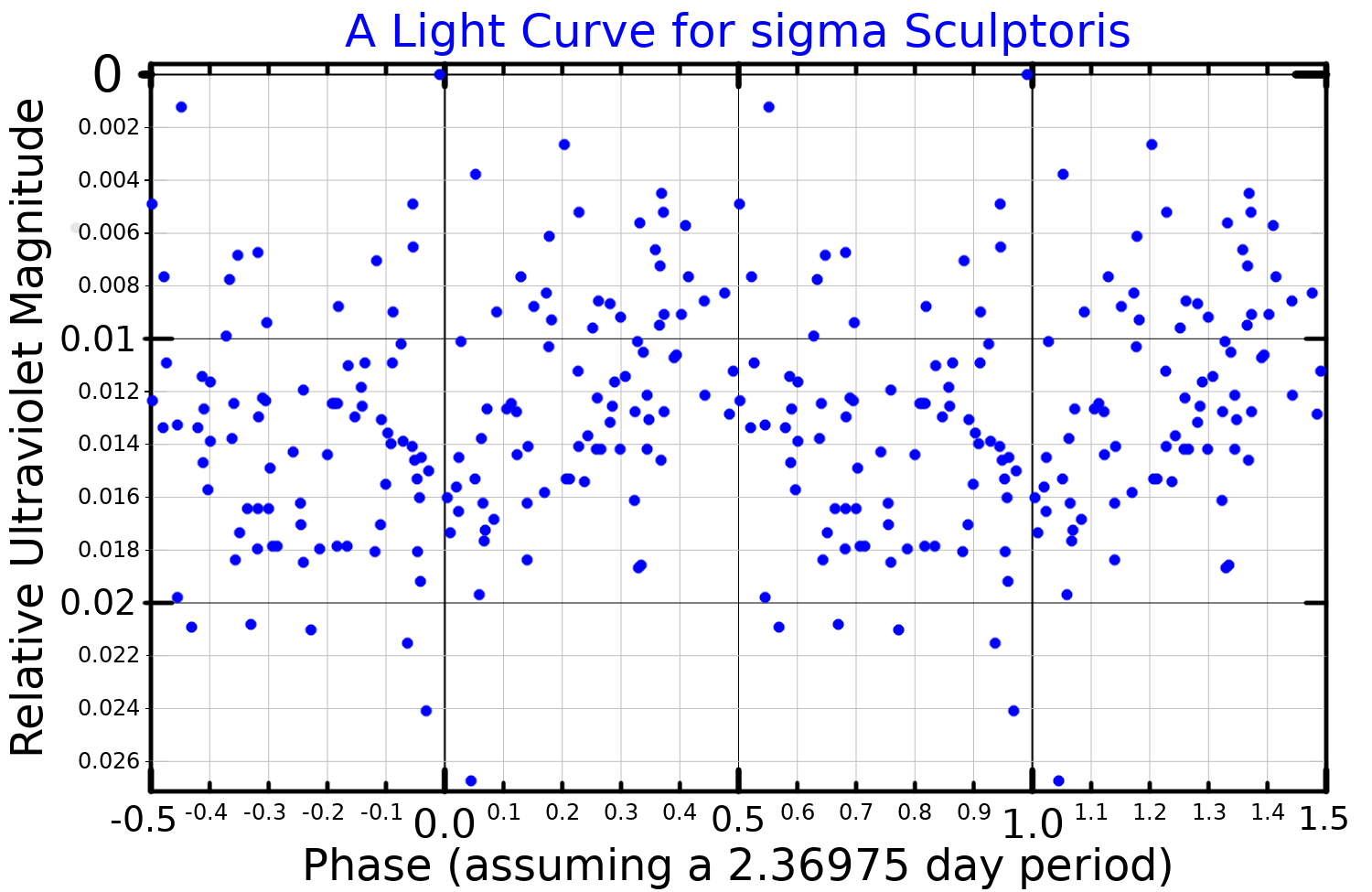
- An ultraviolet light curve for Sigma Sculptoris, adapted from Manfroid and Renson (1994)

Observation data Epoch J2000.0 Equinox J2000.0 (ICRS)
- Constellation: Sculptor
- Right ascension: 01^{h} 02^{m} 26.43280^{s}
- Declination: −31° 33′ 07.2237″
- Apparent magnitude (V): +5.54

Characteristics
- Evolutionary stage: main sequence
- Spectral type: A1/2 IV
- U−B color index: +0.13
- B−V color index: +0.06

Astrometry
Radial velocity (R_{v})	−15.40±0.50 km/s
Proper motion (μ)	RA: +80.50 mas/yr Dec.: +14.64 mas/yr
Parallax (π)	14.04±0.32 mas
Distance	232 ± 5 ly (71 ± 2 pc)
Absolute magnitude (M_{V})	+1.24

Orbit
Period (P)	46.9 days
Semi-major axis (a)	0.35 au
Eccentricity (e)	0.195
Inclination (i)	27° or 135°
Semi-amplitude (K_{1}) (primary)	10.3 km/s

Details

A
Mass	1.95 M_{☉}
Radius	2.0 R_{☉}
Luminosity	25.7 L_{☉}
Surface gravity (log g)	4.02±0.14 cgs
Temperature	8,470 K
Rotational velocity (v sin i)	82.1±1.2 km/s
Age	560 Myr

B
Mass	0.72 M_{☉}
Radius	0.67 R_{☉}
Temperature	4,530 K

Other designations
- σ Scl, CD−32°410, HD 6178, HIP 4852, HR 293, SAO 192884

Database references
SIMBAD	data

Sigma Sculptoris, Latinized from σ Sculptoris, is a binary star in the southern constellation of Sculptor. It is faintly visible to the naked eye with an apparent visual magnitude of +5.54. Based upon an annual parallax shift of 14.04 mas as seen from Earth, it is located about 232 light years from the Sun.

The main component is a A-type star with a stellar classification of A1/A2 IV, although many modern papers use a spectral class of A2V and describe Sigma Sculptoris as a somewhat evolved main sequence star. It was suspected to be an Ap or Am star, and an Alpha2 Canum Venaticorum variable, but no chemical peculiarity or variability was found in 2018. The star has an estimated 1.95 the mass of the Sun and around two times the Sun's radius. It is spinning with a projected rotational velocity of 82 km/s and is about 560 million years old. Sigma Sculptoris radiates 25.7 times the solar luminosity from its photosphere at an effective temperature of 8,470 K.

The secondary is a relatively small star with 72% the mass of the Sun, 5.7 magnitudes fainter than the primary.

The designation Sigma Sculptoris hasn't always been allocated to this star. It was given this designation by Lacaille when he created Sculptor. When Bode created his own constellation Machina Electrica, he took about half of Sculptor and parts of Fornax, including this star, which he designated Zeta Machinae Electricae. Bode used Sigma Sculptoris for HD 220929 (HR 8914) instead. After Machina Electrica was deemed obsolete by the IAU, the stars were returned to their original constellations.
