= HD 4113 A b =

Exoplanet in the constellation of Sculptor

Discovery
- Discovered by: Tamuz et al.
- Discovery site: La Silla Observatory
- Discovery date: Oct 26, 2007
- Detection method: radial velocity

Orbital characteristics
- Semi-major axis: 1.28 AU (191,000,000 km)
- Eccentricity: 0.903±0.005
- Orbital period (sidereal): 526.62±0.3 d 1.4418 y
- Time of periastron: 2453778±0.2
- Argument of periastron: -42.3±1.9
- Semi-amplitude: 37.8
- Star: HD 4113 A

HD 4113 A b is a jovian planet located approximately 137 light-years away in the constellation of Sculptor, orbiting a star in the binary system HD 4113 A. This planet has a very eccentric orbit with a 527-day period at 1.28 AU from the parent star. At periastron, the distance is 0.124 AU and at apastron, the distance is 2.44 AU.

== See also ==
- HD 156846 b
