= HD 156846 =

Star in the constellation Ophiuchus

Observation data Epoch J2000 Equinox ICRS
- Constellation: Ophiuchus
- A
- Right ascension: 17^{h} 20^{m} 34.31089^{s}
- Declination: −19° 20′ 01.4917″
- Apparent magnitude (V): 6.506
- B
- Right ascension: 17^{h} 20^{m} 34.31093^{s}
- Declination: −19° 20′ 01.4944″
- Apparent magnitude (V): 14.10

Characteristics

A
- Evolutionary stage: main sequence
- Spectral type: G1V
- B−V color index: 0.557

B
- Evolutionary stage: main sequence
- Spectral type: M4V

Astrometry
Radial velocity (R_{v})	−68.50±0.22 km/s
Absolute magnitude (M_{V})	+3.055

A
Proper motion (μ)	RA: −137.076±0.029 mas/yr Dec.: −143.378±0.019 mas/yr
Parallax (π)	20.9684±0.0229 mas
Distance	155.5 ± 0.2 ly (47.69 ± 0.05 pc)

Details

A
Mass	1.35±0.045 M_{☉}
Radius	2.12±0.12 R_{☉}
Luminosity	5.07 L_{☉}
Surface gravity (log g)	3.92±0.08 cgs
Temperature	5,969±44 K
Metallicity [Fe/H]	+0.17±0.04 dex
Rotational velocity (v sin i)	5.05±0.50 km/s
Age	2.8+0.1 −0.2 Gyr

B
Mass	0.59 M_{☉}
Radius	0.56 R_{☉}
Luminosity	0.049 L_{☉}
Temperature	3,592 K

Other designations
- HD 156846, HIP 84856, HR 6441, WDS J17206-1920
- A: BD−19°4605, GC 23420, SAO 160474
- B: TIC 75673521, 2MASS J17203464-1919599

Database references
SIMBAD	data
- B

HD 156846 is a binary star system in the equatorial constellation of Ophiuchus, positioned a degree SSE of Messier 9. It has a yellow hue and is just barely bright enough to be visible to the naked eye with an apparent visual magnitude of 6.5. The system is located at a distance of 156 light years from the Sun based on parallax. It is drifting closer with a radial velocity of −68.5 km/s, and is predicted to come to within 85.0 light-years in about 476,000 years.

The primary, component A, is a G-type star with a stellar classification of G1V. The absolute visual magnitude of this star is 1.13 magnitudes above the main sequence, indicating it has evolved slightly off the main sequence. It has 1.35 times the mass of the Sun and 2.12 times the Sun's radius. The star is an estimated 2.8 billion years old and is spinning with a projected rotational velocity of 5 km/s. It is radiating five times the luminosity of the Sun from its photosphere at an effective temperature of 5,969 K.

The magnitude 14.1 secondary companion, component B, was discovered by the American astronomer R. G. Aitken in 1910. It lies at an angular separation of 5.1″ from the primary, corresponding to a projected separation of 250 AU. This is a red dwarf with a class of M4V and has an estimated 59% of the Sun's mass.

== Planetary system ==
On 26 October 2007, a planet HD 156846 b was found orbiting the primary star by Tamuz, using the radial velocity method. It has an orbital period of 0.98 years and a large eccentricity of 0.85. The estimated mass of this object is, at a minimum, 10.6 times the mass of Jupiter. If it were following the same orbit within the Solar System, it would have a perihelion within the orbit of Mercury and an aphelion outside the orbit of Mars.

The HD 156846 planetary system
Companion (in order from star)	Mass	Semimajor axis (AU)	Orbital period (days)	Eccentricity	Inclination (°)	Radius
b	≥10.57±0.29 M_{J}	1.096±0.021	359.5546±0.0071	0.84785±0.00050	—	—

== See also ==
- HD 4113
- List of extrasolar planets
