= HD 156846 b =

Exoplanet in the constellation Ophiuchus

Discovery
- Discovered by: Tamuz et al.
- Discovery site: La Silla Observatory
- Discovery date: Oct 26, 2007
- Detection method: radial velocity

Orbital characteristics
- Apastron: 1.83 AU (274,000,000 km)
- Periastron: 0.15 AU (22,000,000 km)
- Semi-major axis: 0.99 AU (148,000,000 km)
- Eccentricity: 0.8472±0.0016
- Orbital period (sidereal): 359.51±0.09 d 0.98427 y
- Average orbital speed: 30.1
- Time of periastron: 2453998.09±0.05
- Argument of periastron: 52.23±0.41
- Semi-amplitude: 123.9
- Star: HD 156846

HD 156846 b is an extrasolar planet located approximately 160 light-years away in the constellation of Ophiuchus, orbiting the star HD 156846. It has one of the most eccentric planetary orbits known. The high eccentricity of this planet's orbit is probably attributable to the presence of a red dwarf companion star. The average distance of the planet from HD 156846 is 0.99 AU, nearly identical to the distance of Earth from the Sun. The distance ranges from 0.15 AU to 1.83 AU with a 360-day period, also very close to the period of the Earth. It is also very massive with at least 10.45 Jupiter masses. The mass is a lower limit because the inclination of the orbit is not known; if its inclination and hence true mass became known, it would probably be found to be a brown dwarf, or even a red dwarf.
