= Alpha Sculptoris =

Star in the southern constellation of Sculptor

α Sculptoris
- Location of α Sculptoris (circled)

Observation data Epoch J2000.0 Equinox ICRS
- Constellation: Sculptor
- Right ascension: 00^{h} 58^{m} 36.35930^{s}
- Declination: −29° 21′ 26.8247″
- Apparent magnitude (V): +4.30

Characteristics
- Spectral type: B7 IIIp
- U−B color index: −0.515
- B−V color index: −0.155
- Variable type: SX Ari

Astrometry
| Radial velocity (R_{v}) | +10.2 km/s |
| Proper motion (μ) | RA: +20.13 mas/yr Dec.: +5.31 mas/yr |
| Parallax (π) | 4.20±0.18 mas |
| Distance | 780 ± 30 ly (240 ± 10 pc) |
| Absolute magnitude (M_{V}) | −2.58 |

Details
| Mass | 5.01 M_{☉} |
| Radius | 7.52 R_{☉} |
| Luminosity | 1,549 L_{☉} |
| Surface gravity (log g) | 3.20 cgs |
| Temperature | 13,600 K |
| Metallicity [Fe/H] | 0.90 dex |
| Rotational velocity (v sin i) | 17 km/s |
| Age | 93 Myr |

Other designations
- α Scl, CD−30°297, FK5 35, HD 5737, HIP 4577, HR 280, SAO 166716

Database references
| SIMBAD | data |

Alpha Sculptoris, Latinized from α Sculptoris, is the Bayer designation for a blue-white star in the southern constellation of Sculptor. It has an apparent visual magnitude of +4.30, which makes it the brightest star in this generally faint constellation. Parallax measurements collected during the Hipparcos mission provide a distance estimate for this star, placing it at roughly 780 light-years (240 parsecs), with a 4% margin of error.

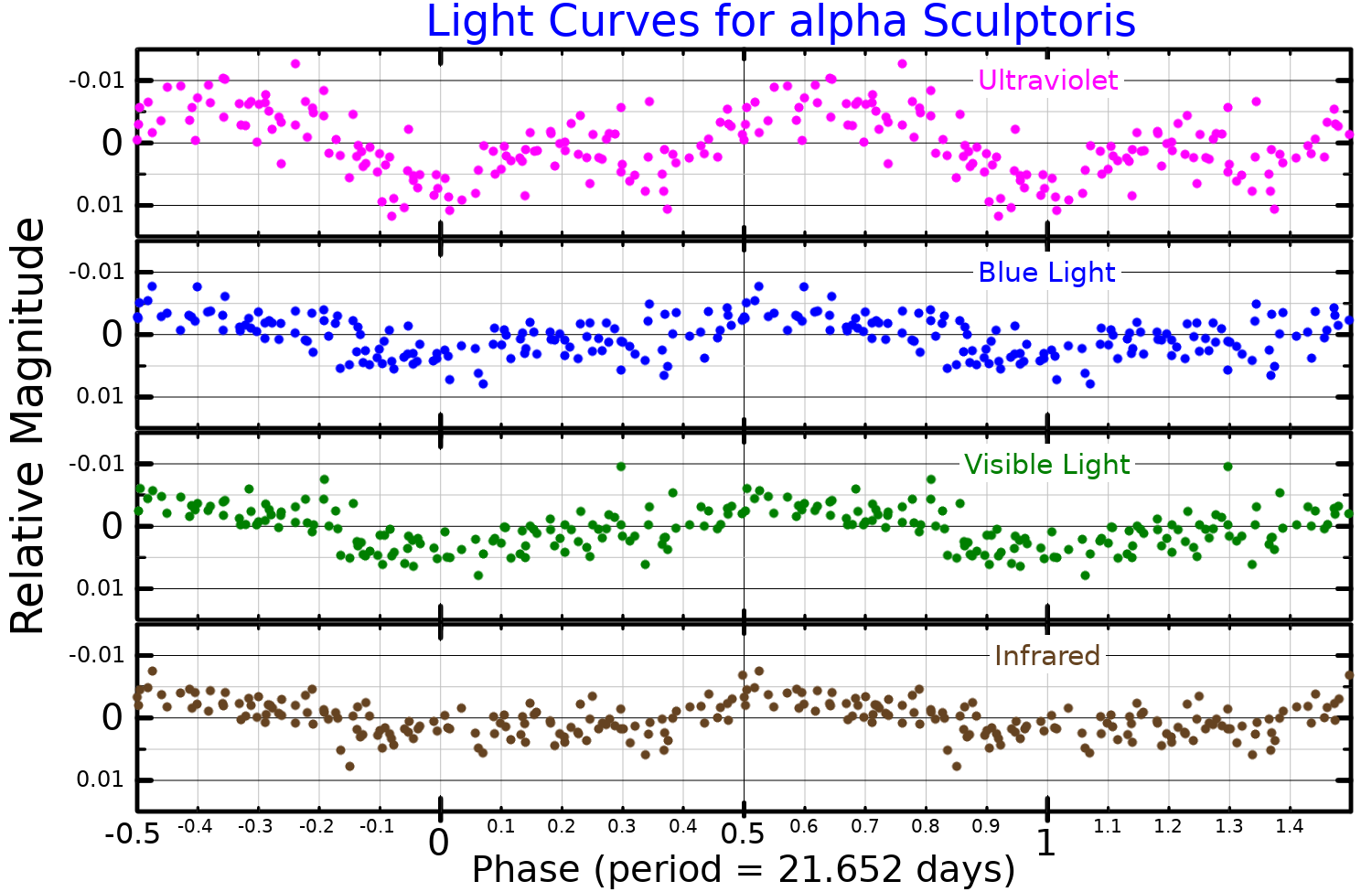
Light curves in four photometric bands for Alpha Sculptoris, adapted from Manfroid and Renson (1994)

Alpha Sculptoris is a B-type giant star. It is classified as an SX Arietis type variable star and its magnitude varies by less than a tenth of a magnitude.

The luminosity of α Scl is around 1,500 times that of the Sun while its surface temperature is 13,600 K. The radius of Alpha Sculptoris is calculated to be seven times solar while its mass is five times that of the Sun.
