= RT Sculptoris =

Binary star in the constellation Pegasus

Observation data Epoch J2000.0 Equinox J2000.0
- Constellation: Sculptor
- Right ascension: 00^{h} 36^{m} 28.090^{s}
- Declination: −25° 40′ 22.93″
- Apparent magnitude (V): 10.18; Min I: 10.89; Min II: 10.47

Characteristics
- Spectral type: A5n + F3
- Variable type: Semidetached β Lyr?

Astrometry
Radial velocity (R_{v})	+30.6 km/s
Proper motion (μ)	RA: 29.248 mas/yr Dec.: 34.121 mas/yr
Parallax (π)	3.4604±0.0198 mas
Distance	943 ± 5 ly (289 ± 2 pc)

Orbit
Period (P)	0.51156012 d
Semi-major axis (a)	≥ 3.52±0.14 R_{☉}
Semi-amplitude (K_{1}) (primary)	105.2±1.8 km/s

Details

Primary
Mass	1.37 ± 0.01 M_{☉}
Radius	1.53 ± 0.01 R_{☉}
Metallicity [Fe/H]	−0.75 dex

Secondary
Mass	0.61 ± 0.01 M_{☉}
Radius	0.97 ± 0.01 R_{☉}

Other designations
- RT Scl, CD−26°179, HIP 118149, SAO 108933, PPM 143009, WDS J23579+1557A

Database references
SIMBAD	data

RT Sculptoris is an eclipsing binary star system in the southern constellation of Sculptor. With a typical apparent visual magnitude of 10.18, it is much too faint to be visible with the naked eye. Based on parallax measurements, it is located at a distance of approximately 943 light-years (289 pc) from the Earth. The system is receding from the Sun with a line of sight velocity component of +30.6 km/s.

== Observations ==
In 1908, this system was discovered to be an eclipsing variable of the Beta Lyrae type by Ida Whiteside, a volunteer observer at Harvard College Observatory. It showed continuous variability with two maxima and two minima, having a period of 0.511574 days. By 1925, the period had been refined to 0.51156935±0.00000009 days, with the interval between the primary and secondary minima being only 45% of the period from one primary minimum to the next.

By 1958, it became evident that the orbital period of RT Sculptoris was not constant. The period measured in October 1954 had decreased to 0.51156249 days, or one second shorter over a period of 50 years. The light curve for the system showed the two maxima are slightly unequal and are not flat topped. The pair undergo partial eclipses with the primary minimum being caused by an occultation. The secondary minimum was found to be displaced and asymmetrical, showing a steeper descent on the descending branch compared to the ascending branch.

This system was found metal-deficient compared to the Sun. It was proposed that the confirmed period change could be explained by a mass exchange between the two components. In this model, the higher mass component is filling its Roche lobe, forming a semi-detached binary. The overflow is being accreted by the secondary, creating a small hot spot. The mass transfer rate is estimated at 1.3×10^{−8} M_{☉} per year. The primary appears to be a late A-type star, while there is some disagreement about the secondary; the latter has been modelled as an F-, G- and even K-type star.
