= HD 9578 =

Candidate binary star system in the constellation Sculptor

Observation data Epoch J2000.0 Equinox ICRS
- Constellation: Sculptor
- Right ascension: 01^{h} 33^{m} 17.14454^{s}
- Declination: −38° 14′ 42.0572″
- Apparent magnitude (V): 8.35

Characteristics
- Evolutionary stage: main sequence
- Spectral type: G1V + ~M4
- Apparent magnitude (B): 8.788
- Apparent magnitude (J): 7.156
- Apparent magnitude (H): 6.89
- Apparent magnitude (K): 6.798
- B−V color index: 0.680±0.015

Astrometry
Radial velocity (R_{v})	−3.94±0.13 km/s
Proper motion (μ)	RA: −31.339±0.013 mas/yr Dec.: −38.258±0.015 mas/yr
Parallax (π)	17.8453±0.0199 mas
Distance	182.8 ± 0.2 ly (56.04 ± 0.06 pc)
Absolute magnitude (M_{V})	4.76

Details

A
Mass	1.02+0.03 −0.02 M_{☉}
Radius	1.11+0.05 −0.08 R_{☉}
Luminosity	1.4 L_{☉}
Surface gravity (log g)	4.42±0.05 cgs
Temperature	5,798±50 K
Metallicity [Fe/H]	0.08±0.04 dex
Rotational velocity (v sin i)	2.36 km/s
Age	5.56+0.65 −3.36 Gyr

B
Mass	0.21 M_{☉}

Other designations
- CD−38°528, CPD−38°128, HD 9578, HIP 7240, SAO 193177, PPM 277127, TYC 7541-00066-1, 2MASS J01331715-3814421

Database references
SIMBAD	data

HD 9578 is a candidate wide binary star system located at a distance of approximately 183 light-years from the Sun in the southern constellation of Sculptor. The main star must be viewed with binoculars or a telescope, as its low apparent visual magnitude of 8.35 is too faint to be viewed with the naked eye. The system is drifting closer to the Sun with a radial velocity of −4 km/s.

The primary component is an ordinary G-type main-sequence star with a stellar classification of G1V. It is around five and a half billion years old, and is spinning with a projected rotational velocity of 2.4 km/s. The star has nearly the same mass as the Sun but with an 11% greater girth. It is radiating 1.4 times the luminosity of the Sun from its photosphere at an effective temperature of 5,798 K.

A faint co-moving companion was detected in 2015, located at an angular separation of 3.245″±0.010″ along a position angle of 251.19°±0.10° from the primary, corresponding to a projected separation of 186 AU. Designated component B, it is a red dwarf with a class of around M4 and has an estimated 0.21 times the mass of the Sun.

The discovery of a candidate extrasolar planetary companion was announced in a press release in October 2009, but although mentioned in one paper, it has not been published in a peer-reviewed journal, as noted by a 2017 study. Designated HD 9578 b, this object is thought to have at least 0.62 times the mass of Jupiter, and take 1.35 years to orbit the primary, with an orbital semimajor axis of 1.27 AU. One 2026 publication, however, disputed the planet's existence, finding that the radial velocity variations, which were thought to be caused by an orbiting body, are correlated with stellar activity indicators, which suggests a stellar, rather than planetary, origin.
