= WASP-8b =

Planet orbiting a star in a binary system in the constellation of Sculptor

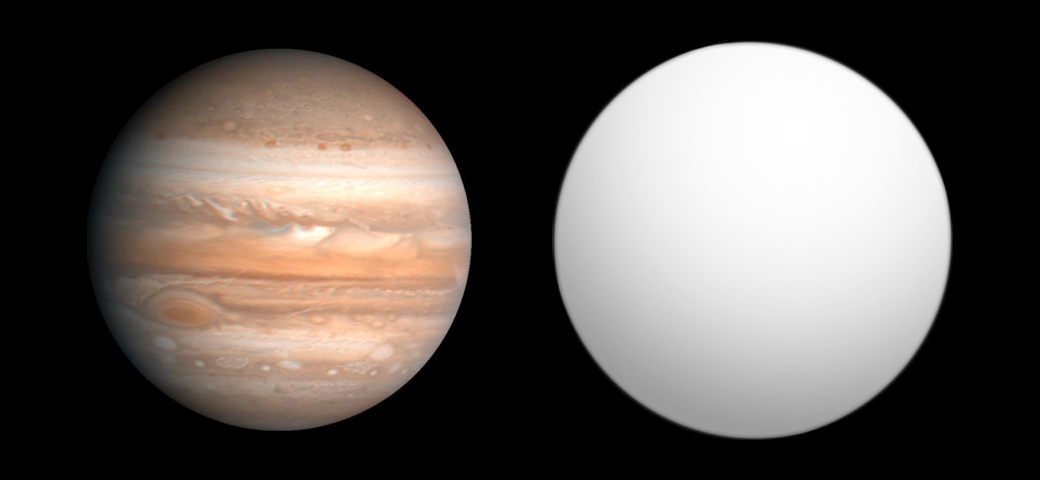
- Size comparison of WASP-8b with Jupiter.

Discovery
- Discovered by: Cameron et al. (SuperWASP)
- Discovery date: April 1, 2008
- Detection method: Transit

Orbital characteristics
- Semi-major axis: 0.0817±0.0006 AU
- Eccentricity: 0.3057±0.0046
- Orbital period (sidereal): 8.158715±0.000016 d
- Inclination: 88.51°±0.09°
- Argument of perihelion: 274.21°±0.33°
- Semi-amplitude: 221.65±1.39 m/s
- Star: WASP-8

Physical characteristics
- Mean radius: 1.165±0.032 R_{J}
- Mass: 2.216±0.035 M_{J}
- Mean density: 1.7370±0.1325 g/cm^{3}
- Surface gravity: 42.5±2.3 m/s^{2} (4.34 g)
- Temperature: 1552±85 K (1,279 °C; 2,334 °F)

WASP-8b is an exoplanet orbiting the star WASP-8A in the constellation of Sculptor. The star is similar to the Sun and forms a binary star with a red dwarf star (WASP-8B) of half the Sun's mass that orbits WASP-8A 4.5 arcseconds away. The system is 294 light-years (90 parsecs) away and is therefore located closer to Earth than many other star systems that are known to feature planets similar to WASP-8b. The planet and its parent star were discovered in the SuperWASP batch -6b to -15b. On 1 April 2008, Dr. Don Pollacco of Queen's University Belfast announced them at the RAS National Astronomy Meeting (NAM 2008).

== Orbit ==
The planet orbits WASP-8A at an average distance of just 0.08 AU (12,000,000 km) and a year passes in slightly more than 8.1 days on WASP-8b, which is somewhat farther from its parent star than other hot Jupiter planets. However, WASP-8b's orbit also has a relatively high eccentricity of 0.3, which, at periastron, brings it as close to its star as said similar planets are.

One thing that stands out extremely about WASP-8b is its orbit-spin angle to its star of 123°+3.4°
−4.4°: This implies that the planet actually orbits retrograde to the spin of the parent star.

== Physical characteristics ==
WASP-8b belongs to a class of extrasolar planets known as hot Jupiters and has a mass about 2.2 times and a radius slightly bigger than that of the planet Jupiter. Its density is about 1.737 g/cm^{3}; this implies that, unlike similar close-orbiting gas giants, the planet is actually denser than Jupiter (which has a density of 1.326 g/cm^{3}).

Owing to its close distance to its star, WASP-8b is extremely hot: Its measured dayside temperature is 1,552 K (1,279 °C), this is even hotter than its equilibrium temperature of 947 K (674 °C).

== See also ==
- Wide Angle Search for Planets
