= HD 4113 =

Binary star system in the constellation of Sculptor

Observation data Epoch J2000.0 Equinox ICRS
- Constellation: Sculptor
- HD 4113 A
- Right ascension: 00^{h} 43^{m} 12.59559^{s}
- Declination: −37° 58′ 57.4777″
- Apparent magnitude (V): 7.880±0.013
- HD 4113 B
- Right ascension: 00^{h} 43^{m} 11.89423^{s}
- Declination: −37° 58′ 09.1687″
- Apparent magnitude (V): 12.70±0.02

Characteristics
- Spectral type: G5V and M0–1V
- B−V color index: 0.716±0.003

Astrometry

HD 4113 A
Radial velocity (R_{v})	5.05±0.12 km/s
Proper motion (μ)	RA: 49.412±0.016 mas/yr Dec.: −114.290±0.024 mas/yr
Parallax (π)	23.8256±0.0240 mas
Distance	136.9 ± 0.1 ly (41.97 ± 0.04 pc)
Absolute magnitude (M_{V})	4.780±0.046

HD 4113 B
Radial velocity (R_{v})	4.44±0.39 km/s
Proper motion (μ)	RA: 53.733±0.022 mas/yr Dec.: −113.983±0.032 mas/yr
Parallax (π)	23.9023±0.0327 mas
Distance	136.5 ± 0.2 ly (41.84 ± 0.06 pc)
Absolute magnitude (M_{V})	9.600±0.049

Orbit
Name	HD 4113 C
Period (P)	349+22 −15 yr
Semi-major axis (a)	50.4+2.1 −1.4 AU
Eccentricity (e)	0.648+0.008 −0.007
Inclination (i)	83.5+2.3 −1.3°
Longitude of the node (Ω)	225.7+0.7 −1.5°
Periastron epoch (T)	2324300+127000 −7900
Argument of periastron (ω) (secondary)	249.7+3.6 −4.8°
Semi-amplitude (K_{1}) (primary)	0.264+0.002 −0.003 km/s

Details

A
Mass	1.02+0.02 −0.03 M_{☉}
Radius	1.08+0.02 −0.04 R_{☉}
Luminosity	1.085+0.04 −0.03 L_{☉}
Surface gravity (log g)	4.31±0.04 cgs
Temperature	5,638±50 K
Metallicity [Fe/H]	0.20±0.04 dex
Rotational velocity (v sin i)	2.324 km/s
Age	7.29+1.91 −1.46 or 5.0+1.3 −1.7 Gyr

B
Mass	0.55 M_{☉}
Surface gravity (log g)	4.76 cgs
Temperature	3,833 K

C
Mass	51.9+0.6 −0.5 M_{Jup}
Radius	1.4–1.5 R_{Jup}
Surface gravity (log g)	4.5–5 cgs
Temperature	500–600 K

Other designations
- CD−38°223, GC 858, HD 4113, HIP 3391, SAO 192693, GSC 03654-02131

Database references
SIMBAD	data
Exoplanet Archive	data

HD 4113 is a double star system in the southern constellation of Sculptor. It is too faint to be viewed with the naked eye, having an apparent visual magnitude of 7.88. The distance to this star, as estimated by parallax measurements, is 137 light years. It is receding away from the Sun with a radial velocity of +5 km/s.

== System components ==
The primary member of this system, component A, is a Sun-like G-type main-sequence star with a stellar classification of G5V. Estimates of its age are five to seven billion years old, and it is spinning with a leisurely projected rotational velocity of 2.3 km/s. The star is metal rich, with nearly the same mass, radius, and luminosity as the Sun.

Orbiting this star is a giant planet and a brown dwarf (HD 4113 C); the latter has been directly imaged. It also has a co-moving stellar companion, designated component B, which is a red dwarf with a class of M0–1V at an angular separation of 43″. This angle is equivalent to a projected separation of 2,000 AU.

The most recent parameters for HD 4113 C as of 2022 come from a combination of data from radial velocity, astrometry, and imaging, showing that it is about 52 times the mass of Jupiter, and on an eccentric orbit with a semi-major axis of about 50.4 AU and an orbital period of about 348 years.

Observations with SPHERE found a lack of a detection of HD 4113 C in H3, likely due to methane absorption in the H-band. Using the extracted spectrum the team estimated a spectral type of T9. Observation with GRAVITY+ showed strong methane absorption in the K-band spectrum of HD 4113 C. The inconsistency between temperature and isochronal mass estimate is seen as potential evidence for a binary brown dwarf.

== Planetary system ==
On 26 October 2007, Tamuz et al. used the radial velocity method to find a planet with a minimum mass one and half times that of Jupiter orbiting at 1.28 AU away from HD 4113 A. The planet's orbit is highly eccentric.

The HD 4113 A planetary system
Companion (in order from star)	Mass	Semimajor axis (AU)	Orbital period (years)	Eccentricity	Inclination (°)	Radius
b	≥1.703+0.040 −0.059 M_{J}	1.280±0.004	1.442+0.0002 −0.0001	0.899+0.004 −0.003	—	—

== See also ==
- HD 156846
- List of extrasolar planets
