= Gamma Sculptoris =

Solitary orange-hued star in the constellation Sculptor

γ Sculptoris
- Location of γ Sculptoris (circled)

Observation data Epoch J2000 Equinox ICRS
- Constellation: Sculptor
- Right ascension: 23^{h} 18^{m} 49.44076^{s}
- Declination: −32° 31′ 55.2890″
- Apparent magnitude (V): 4.41

Characteristics
- Evolutionary stage: red clump
- Spectral type: K1 III
- U−B color index: +1.06
- B−V color index: +1.13

Astrometry
Radial velocity (R_{v})	+15.60 km/s
Proper motion (μ)	RA: +20.13 mas/yr Dec.: −77.72 mas/yr
Parallax (π)	17.90±0.19 mas
Distance	182 ± 2 ly (55.9 ± 0.6 pc)
Absolute magnitude (M_{V})	0.67

Details
Mass	1.15–1.31 M_{☉}
Radius	11.61±0.24 R_{☉}
Luminosity	53.09+2.37 −2.27 L_{☉}
Surface gravity (log g)	2.29±0.17 cgs
Temperature	4,580±30 K
Metallicity [Fe/H]	−0.10±0.04 dex
Rotational velocity (v sin i)	1.7 km/s
Age	3.98±0.37 – 5.83±0.62 Gyr

Other designations
- γ Scl, CD−33°16476, FK5 879, GC 32450, GJ 9821, HD 219784, HIP 115102, HR 8863, SAO 214444, GSC 07510-01089

Database references
SIMBAD	data

Gamma Sculptoris, Latinized from γ Sculptoris, is a single, orange-hued star in the constellation Sculptor. Based upon an annual parallax shift of 17.90 mas as seen from Earth, this star is located about 182 light years from the Sun. It is bright enough to be visible to the naked eye with an apparent visual magnitude of 4.41. It is moving away from the Sun with a radial velocity of +15.6 km/s.

This is an evolved K-type giant star with a stellar classification of K1 III. At the age of four to six billion years it is a red clump star on the horizontal branch, which means it is generating energy through helium fusion at its core. The star has 1.15 to 1.31 times the mass of the Sun and it has expanded to 11.6 times the Sun's radius. It is radiating 53 times the Sun's luminosity from its enlarged photosphere at an effective temperature of 4,580 K.
