= Xi Sculptoris =

Star in the constellation Sculptor

Observation data Epoch J2000.0 Equinox J2000.0 (ICRS)
- Constellation: Sculptor
- Right ascension: 01^{h} 01^{m} 18.27548^{s}
- Declination: −38° 54′ 59.5033″
- Apparent magnitude (V): 5.59

Characteristics
- Spectral type: K1 III
- B−V color index: +1.185±0.008

Astrometry
Radial velocity (R_{v})	−31.1±2.9 km/s
Proper motion (μ)	RA: +66.892 mas/yr Dec.: +49.891 mas/yr
Parallax (π)	6.6662±0.0829 mas
Distance	489 ± 6 ly (150 ± 2 pc)
Absolute magnitude (M_{V})	−0.39

Details
Mass	2.9 M_{☉}
Radius	22.29+1.18 −1.74 R_{☉}
Luminosity	198 L_{☉}
Surface gravity (log g)	2.12 cgs
Temperature	4,403 K
Metallicity [Fe/H]	−0.48 dex
Rotational velocity (v sin i)	<1.0 km/s

Other designations
- ξ Scl, CD−39°260, HD 6055, HIP 4770, HR 288, SAO 192870

Database references
SIMBAD	data

Xi Sculptoris, Latinized from ξ Sculptoris, is a solitary orange-hued star in the southern constellation of Sculptor, near the southern constellation boundary with Phoenix. It is just visible to the naked eye as a dim point of light with an apparent visual magnitude of 5.59. The distance to Xi Sculptoris is approximately 489 light years based on parallax, while it is drifting closer with a radial velocity of −31 km/s. It has an absolute magnitude of −0.39.

This object is an aging giant star with a stellar classification of K1 III, which indicates it has exhausted the supply of hydrogen at its core then expanded and cooled off the main sequence. At present it has 22 times the girth of the Sun. It is radiating 182 times the luminosity of the Sun from its swollen photosphere at an effective temperature of 4,489 K.
