= Mu Sculptoris =

Star in the constellation Sculptor

- Location of μ Sculptoris (circled)

Observation data Epoch J2000 Equinox ICRS
- Constellation: Sculptor
- Right ascension: 23^{h} 40^{m} 38.14898^{s}
- Declination: −32° 04′ 23.2478″
- Apparent magnitude (V): 5.30 (5.30 – 5.33)

Characteristics
- Evolutionary stage: giant
- Spectral type: K1 III
- U−B color index: +0.69
- B−V color index: +0.97
- Variable type: suspected

Astrometry
Radial velocity (R_{v})	+15.79±0.12 km/s
Proper motion (μ)	RA: −91.30 mas/yr Dec.: −53.29 mas/yr
Parallax (π)	11.6622±0.1228 mas
Distance	280 ± 3 ly (85.7 ± 0.9 pc)
Absolute magnitude (M_{V})	0.54

Details
Mass	1.32 M_{☉}
Radius	10.88+0.16 −0.13 R_{☉}
Luminosity	61.4±0.8 L_{☉}
Surface gravity (log g)	2.50 cgs
Temperature	4,899+29 −35 K
Metallicity [Fe/H]	−0.21 dex
Rotational velocity (v sin i)	2.6 km/s

Other designations
- μ Scl, NSV 14661, CD−32°17621, FK5 1618, GC 32888, HD 222433, HIP 116820, HR 8975, SAO 214701, GSC 07515-01148

Database references
SIMBAD	data

μ Sculptoris, Latinized as Mu Sculptoris, is a solitary, orange-hued star in the southern constellation of Sculptor. It is visible to the naked eye as a dim point of light with an apparent visual magnitude of +5.30. This star is located approximately 291 light years from the Sun based on parallax, and it is drifting further away with a radial velocity of +16 km/s.

This object is an aging K-type giant star with a stellar classification of K1 III. Having exhausted the supply of hydrogen at its core, this star expanded and cooled off the main sequence. At present it has 11 times the girth of the Sun. It is a suspected variable star of unknown type, with its brightness measured as varying from magnitude 5.30 down to 5.33. The star has 1.32 times the mass of the Sun and is radiating 61 times the Sun's luminosity from its swollen photosphere at an effective temperature of 4899 K.
