= Delta Sculptoris =

Triple star system in the constellation of Sculptor

δ Sculptoris
- Location of δ Sculptoris (circled)

Observation data Epoch J2000 Equinox ICRS
- Constellation: Sculptor
- Right ascension: 23^{h} 48^{m} 55.54658^{s}
- Declination: −28° 07′ 48.9745″
- Apparent magnitude (V): 4.57

Characteristics
- Evolutionary stage: main sequence
- Spectral type: A0Vp(Lam Boo)n
- U−B color index: −0.03
- B−V color index: +0.01

Astrometry
Radial velocity (R_{v})	+8.70 km/s
Proper motion (μ)	RA: +100.80 mas/yr Dec.: −105.34 mas/yr
Parallax (π)	23.73±0.22 mas
Distance	137 ± 1 ly (42.1 ± 0.4 pc)
Absolute magnitude (M_{V})	+1.47

Details
Mass	2.19+0.09 −0.13 M_{☉}
Radius	1.85 (Note: Calculated, using the Stefan-Boltzmann law and the star's effective temperature and luminosity, with respect to the solar nominal effective temperature of 5,772 K: $$\sqrt{\biggl(\frac{5,772}{9,930}\biggr)^4 \cdot 30.09} = 1.85\ R_\odot.$$) R_{☉}
Luminosity	30.09+3.46 −3.00 L_{☉}
Surface gravity (log g)	4.22±0.04 cgs
Temperature	9,930±199 K
Metallicity [Fe/H]	−0.14+0.11 −0.18 dex
Rotational velocity (v sin i)	299 km/s

Other designations
- ADS 17021, CCDM J23489-2808AB, CD−28°18353, FK5 896, GC 33050, GSC 06988-01337, HD 223340/223352, HIP 117452, HR 9016, SAO 192167, WDS J23489-2808AB

Database references
SIMBAD	data

Delta Sculptoris (δ Scl, δ Sculptoris) is a triple star system in the constellation Sculptor. It is approximately 137.4 light years from Earth.

The primary component, Delta Sculptoris A, is a white A-type main-sequence and Lambda Boötis star with an apparent magnitude of +4.59. It has a faint, magnitude 11.6 companion, Delta Sculptoris B, 4 arcseconds, or more than 175 astronomical units, away from it. Orbiting this pair at the much greater separation of 74 arcseconds, is the G-type Delta Sculptoris C, which has an apparent magnitude of +9.4.

This system is a candidate member of the AB Doradus moving group, an association of stars with similar ages that share a common heading through space.
