= Iota Sculptoris =

Star in the constellation Sculptor

ι Sculptoris
- Location of ι Sculptoris (circled, masked by green line)

Observation data Epoch J2000 Equinox ICRS
- Constellation: Sculptor
- Right ascension: 00^{h} 21^{m} 31.19799^{s}
- Declination: −28° 58′ 53.2957″
- Apparent magnitude (V): 5.18

Characteristics
- Spectral type: K0III
- U−B color index: +0.84
- B−V color index: +1.00

Astrometry
Radial velocity (R_{v})	+20.60 km/s
Proper motion (μ)	RA: +33.263 mas/yr Dec.: -72.065 mas/yr
Parallax (π)	9.7081±0.1287 mas
Distance	336 ± 4 ly (103 ± 1 pc)
Absolute magnitude (M_{V})	0.16

Details
Mass	2.94 M_{☉}
Radius	12.28 R_{☉}
Luminosity	97 L_{☉}
Surface gravity (log g)	2.48 cgs
Temperature	5,020 K
Metallicity [Fe/H]	+0.09 dex
Rotational velocity (v sin i)	3.1 km/s

Other designations
- ι Scl, CD−29°86, GC 433, HD 1737, HIP 1708, HR 84, SAO 166207, GSC 06419-01055

Database references
SIMBAD	data

ι Sculptoris, Latinized as Iota Sculptoris and abbreviated iot Scl, is a solitary star in the southern constellation of Sculptor. It is visible to the naked eye as a dim, orange-hued point of light with an apparent visual magnitude of 5.18. The star is located approximately 336 light years from the Sun based on parallax, and is drifting further away with a radial velocity of +21 km/s.

This is an aging giant star with a stellar classification of K0III, currently on the red giant branch. It has 2.9 times the mass of the Sun and has expanded to 12 times the Sun's radius. The star is radiating 97 times the luminosity of the Sun from its enlarged photosphere at an effective temperature of 5,020 K. These coordinates are a source for X-ray emission, which is most likely (99.4% chance) coming from the star.
