= WASP-8 =

Star in the constellation of Sculptor

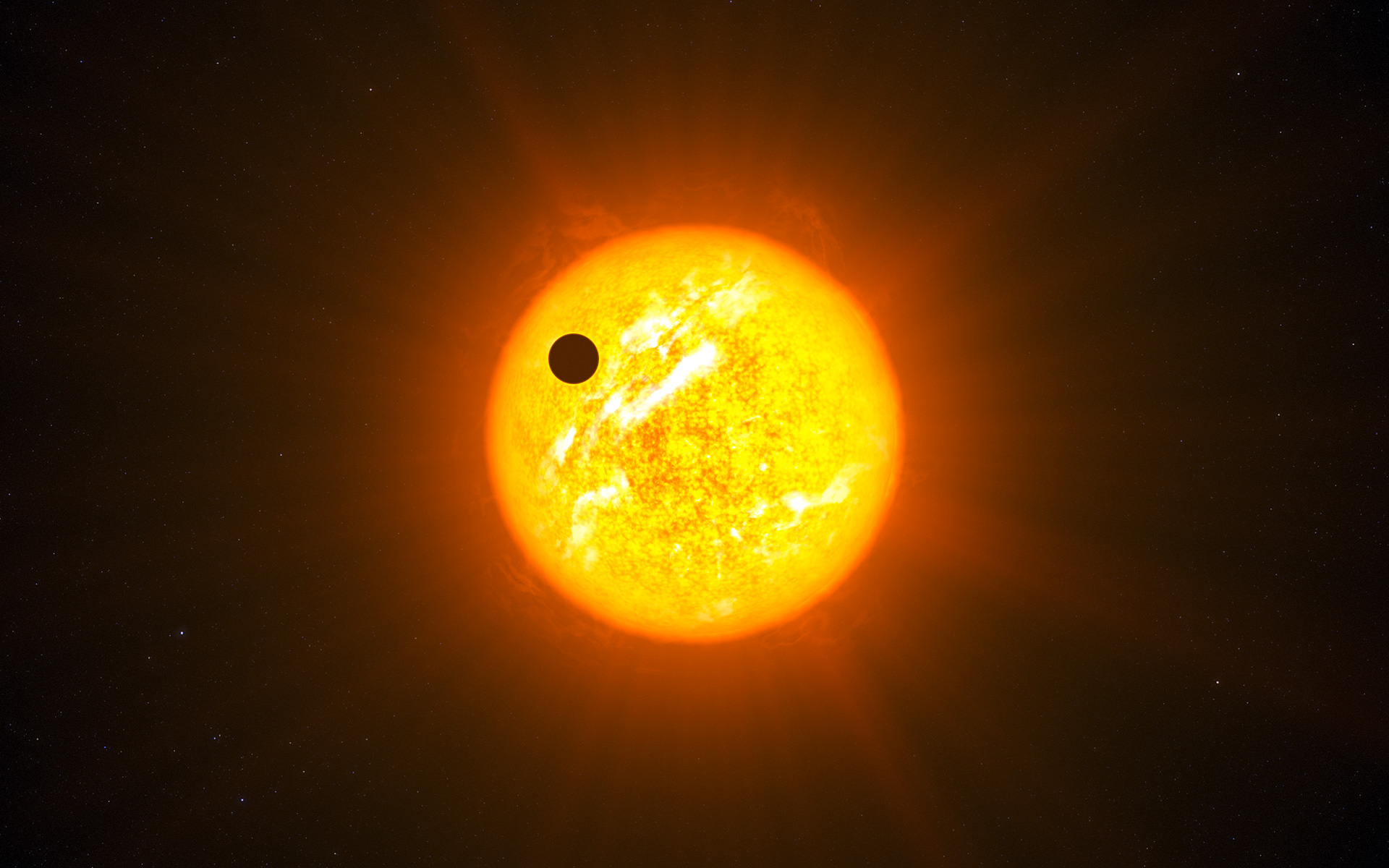
- Artist's impression of a star like WASP-8

Observation data Epoch J2000 Equinox ICRS
- Constellation: Sculptor
- A
- Right ascension: 23^{h} 59^{m} 36.07119^{s}
- Declination: −35° 01′ 52.9236″
- Apparent magnitude (V): 9.87
- B
- Right ascension: 23^{h} 59^{m} 36.12827^{s}
- Declination: −35° 01′ 57.3448″
- Apparent magnitude (V): 9.87

Characteristics

WASP-8A
- Evolutionary stage: main sequence
- Spectral type: G8V

WASP-8B
- Evolutionary stage: main sequence
- Spectral type: M

Astrometry

A
Radial velocity (R_{v})	−1.38±0.26 km/s
Proper motion (μ)	RA: +109.752 mas/yr Dec.: +7.615 mas/yr
Parallax (π)	11.1052±0.0175 mas
Distance	293.7 ± 0.5 ly (90.0 ± 0.1 pc)

B
Radial velocity (R_{v})	−1.38±0.26 km/s
Proper motion (μ)	RA: +110.322 mas/yr Dec.: +5.448 mas/yr
Parallax (π)	11.1038±0.0197 mas
Distance	293.7 ± 0.5 ly (90.1 ± 0.2 pc)

Orbit
Semi-major axis (a)	449+396 −162 au
Eccentricity (e)	0.52+0.41 −0.36
Inclination (i)	94+6.5 −1.2°
Longitude of the node (Ω)	173+175 −9.1°
Argument of periastron (ω) (secondary)	172+150 −109°

Details

WASP-8A
Mass	1.093±0.024 M_{☉}
Radius	0.976±0.020 R_{☉}
Luminosity	0.79 L_{☉}
Surface gravity (log g)	4.498±0.018 cgs
Temperature	5600±80 K
Metallicity [Fe/H]	0.29±0.03 dex
Rotational velocity (v sin i)	1.90±0.05 km/s
Age	0.3+0.9 −0.1 Gyr

WASP-8B
Mass	0.53±0.02 M_{☉}
Temperature	3758+47 −43 K

Other designations
- CD−35 16019, CPD−35 9465, SAO 214901, PPM 304426, WDS J23596-3502A, TOI-191, TIC 183532609, WASP-8, TYC 7522-505-1, 2MASS J23593607-3501530

Database references
SIMBAD	A
- B
Exoplanet Archive	data

WASP-8 is a binary star system 294 light-years (90 parsecs) away. The star system is much younger than the Sun at 300 million to 1.2 billion years age, and is heavily enriched in heavy elements, having nearly twice the concentration of iron compared to the Sun.

The primary, WASP-8A, is a magnitude 9.9 main-sequence yellow dwarf star. It is reported to be a G-type star with a temperature of 5600 K and has a mass 1.093±0.024, a radius 0.976±0.020 and a luminosity of 0.79 times that of the Sun. There is a companion star WASP-8B located 4.5 arcseconds away with the same proper motion, indicating a stellar binary system. The binarity was confirmed in 2020. The axis orientation of the primary star is uncertain, but it is close to pointing one of the poles to the Earth.

== Planetary system ==
The primary star is orbited by two known exoplanets, designated WASP-8b and WASP-8c. WASP-8b was discovered in 2010 by the astronomical transit method and was catalogued as part of the SuperWASP mission. WASP-8c was discovered in late 2013 with the radial velocity method. Its properties were revised in a 2026 study incorporating astrometry; it is farther from the star and more massive than previously estimated, large enough to be a brown dwarf. The orbits of WASP-8b & c, and the companion star WASP-8B, are nearly coplanar, but misaligned with the primary star's rotation.

The WASP-8 A planetary system
Companion (in order from star)	Mass	Semimajor axis (AU)	Orbital period (days)	Eccentricity	Inclination (°)	Radius
b	2.216±0.035 M_{J}	0.0817±0.0006	8.158715(16)	0.3057±0.0046	88.51±0.09	1.165±0.032 R_{J}
c	26.1+13 −7.9 M_{J}	8.7±1.4	9608+2488 −2173	0.26+0.13 −0.11	93+23 −21	—

== See also ==
- SuperWASP
