= Beta Sculptoris =

Star in the constellation of Sculptor

β Sculptoris
- Location of β Sculptoris (circled)

Observation data Epoch J2000 Equinox ICRS
- Constellation: Sculptor
- Right ascension: 23^{h} 32^{m} 58.25898^{s}
- Declination: −37° 49′ 05.7570″
- Apparent magnitude (V): 4.37

Characteristics
- Evolutionary stage: Main sequence
- Spectral type: B9.5IIIp(HgMnSi)
- U−B color index: −0.36
- B−V color index: −0.09
- Variable type: suspected α^{2} CVn

Astrometry
Radial velocity (R_{v})	+0.4±0.6 km/s
Proper motion (μ)	RA: +95.97 mas/yr Dec.: +38.29 mas/yr
Parallax (π)	18.74±0.15 mas
Distance	174 ± 1 ly (53.4 ± 0.4 pc)
Absolute magnitude (M_{V})	0.74

Details
Mass	3.2±0.2 M_{☉}
Radius	2.0 R_{☉}
Luminosity	81 L_{☉}
Surface gravity (log g)	4.13 cgs
Temperature	12,500 K
Metallicity [Fe/H]	+0.23 dex
Rotation	1.9311 d
Rotational velocity (v sin i)	26 km/s

Other designations
- β Scl, CD−38°15527, FK5 886, GC 32744, HD 221507, HIP 116231, HR 8937, SAO 214615, GSC 08013-01357

Database references
SIMBAD	data

Beta Sculptoris, Latinized from β Sculptoris, is a single, blue-white hued star in the southern constellation of Sculptor. It has an apparent visual magnitude of 4.37, which is bright enough to be seen with the naked eye. Based upon an annual parallax shift of 18.74 mas as seen from Earth, it is located 174 light years from the Sun.

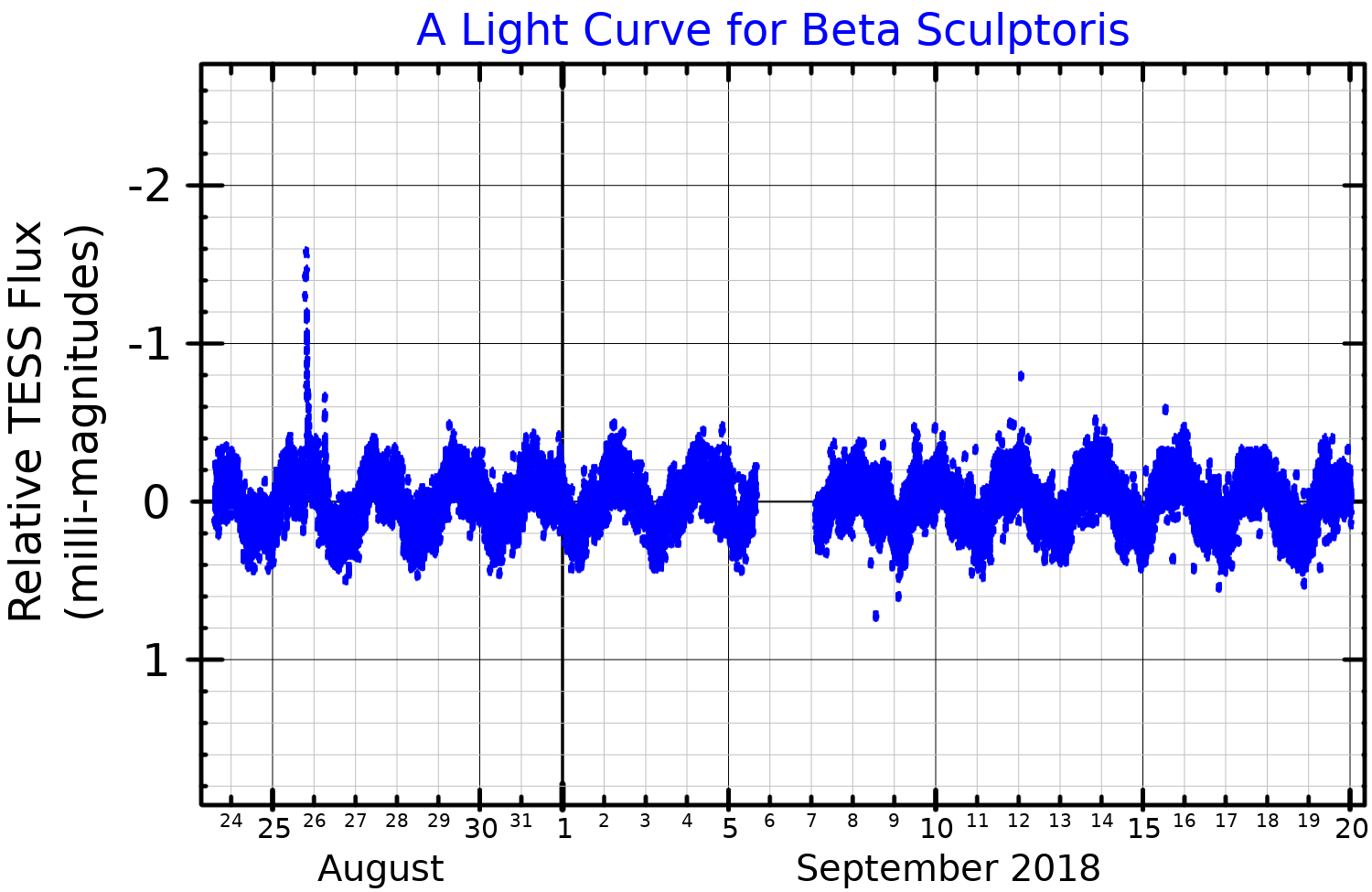
A light curve for Beta Sculptoris, adapted from Pedersen et al. (2019)

This is a B-type main-sequence star, despite its stellar classification of B9.5IIIp(HgMnSi) containing the luminosity class of a giant. It belongs to the class of chemically peculiar stars known as a Mercury-Manganese star, showing overabundances of mercury, manganese, and silicon in its spectrum. It is a suspected α^{2} CVn variable with magnitude variation from 4.35 to 4.39. The star has nearly three times the mass of the Sun and double the Sun's radius. It is radiating 81 times the Sun's luminosity from its photosphere at an effective temperature of 12,110 K.
