= Lambda1 Sculptoris =

Double star in the constellation Sculptor

Lambda^{1} Sculptoris
Observation data Epoch J2000.0 Equinox J2000.0 (ICRS)
- Constellation: Sculptor
- Right ascension: 00^{h} 42^{m} 42.89190^{s}
- Declination: −38° 27′ 48.5416″
- Apparent magnitude (V): +6.05 (6.612 + 7.041)

Characteristics
- Spectral type: B9.5 V + A9(V)
- U−B color index: −0.13
- B−V color index: −0.03

Astrometry
Radial velocity (R_{v})	11.1±0.6 km/s
Proper motion (μ)	RA: +2.56 mas/yr Dec.: −6.72 mas/yr
Parallax (π)	6.89±0.71 mas
Distance	approx. 470 ly (approx. 150 pc)
Absolute magnitude (M_{V})	+0.27

Details

λ^{1} Scl A
Mass	2.83±0.13 M_{☉}
Luminosity	94 L_{☉}
Temperature	10,351 K
Rotational velocity (v sin i)	35 km/s

Other designations
- λ^{1} Scl, CD−39°175, HD 4065, HIP 3356, HR 185, SAO 192690, WDS J00427-3828AB

Database references
SIMBAD	data

Lambda^{1} Sculptoris, Latinised from λ^{1} Sculptoris, is a double star system in the southern constellation of Sculptor. It is close to the lower limit of visibility to the naked eye, with a combined apparent visual magnitude of +6.05. Based upon an annual parallax shift of 6.89 mas as measured from Earth, it is located roughly 470 light-years from the Sun. At that distance, the visual magnitude is diminished by an extinction factor of 0.026 due to interstellar dust.

The brighter star, component A, has a visual magnitude of 6.6, while the secondary, component B, is magnitude 7.0. As of 2000, the pair had an angular separation of 0.737 arcsecond along a position angle of 14.0°. Component A is a blue-white-hued B-type main-sequence star with a stellar classification of B9.5 V. It has 2.8 times the mass of the Sun and radiates 94 times the solar luminosity from its photosphere at an effective temperature of 10,351 K. The mass ratio is 0.609, meaning the secondary is only 60.9% as massive as the primary.
