= Kappa2 Sculptoris =

Star in the constellation Sculptor

Kappa^{2} Sculptoris
Observation data Epoch J2000.0 Equinox J2000.0 (ICRS)
- Constellation: Sculptor
- Right ascension: 00^{h} 11^{m} 34.42072^{s}
- Declination: −27° 47′ 58.9908″
- Apparent magnitude (V): +5.42

Characteristics
- Evolutionary stage: red giant branch
- Spectral type: K2 III
- B−V color index: +1.35

Astrometry
Radial velocity (R_{v})	−5.6±0.8 km/s
Proper motion (μ)	RA: +5.058 mas/yr Dec.: +12.900 mas/yr
Parallax (π)	5.7132±0.0814 mas
Distance	571 ± 8 ly (175 ± 2 pc)
Absolute magnitude (M_{V})	−1.46

Details
Mass	4.2 M_{☉}
Radius	31 R_{☉}
Luminosity	325 L_{☉}
Surface gravity (log g)	1.34 cgs
Temperature	4,393 K
Metallicity [Fe/H]	−0.40 dex
Rotational velocity (v sin i)	2.2 km/s
Age	1.63 Gyr

Other designations
- κ^{2} Scl, CD−28°26, FK5 5, HD 720, HIP 930, HR 34, SAO 166103, WDS J00116-2748A

Database references
SIMBAD	data

Kappa^{2} Sculptoris, Latinized from κ^{2} Sculptoris, is a solitary, orange-hued star in the southern constellation of Sculptor. It is faintly visible to the naked eye, with a combined apparent visual magnitude of +5.42. Based upon an annual parallax shift of 5.7 mas as measured from Earth, it is located approximately 571 light years from the Sun.

This is an evolved K-type giant star with a stellar classification of K2 III. It is radiating 325 times the solar luminosity from its photosphere at an effective temperature of 4,393. There is a faint optical companion with visual magnitude 21.0 located at an angular separation of 44.2 arc seconds along a position angle of 289°, as of 2010.
