= Lambda2 Sculptoris =

Star in the constellation Sculptor

Lambda^{2} Sculptoris
Observation data Epoch J2000.0 Equinox J2000.0 (ICRS)
- Constellation: Sculptor
- Right ascension: 00^{h} 44^{m} 12.09903^{s}
- Declination: −38° 25′ 18.0542″
- Apparent magnitude (V): +5.90

Characteristics
- Evolutionary stage: Horizontal branch
- Spectral type: K1 III
- B−V color index: +1.15

Astrometry
Radial velocity (R_{v})	+28.22±0.13 km/s
Proper motion (μ)	RA: +245.567 mas/yr Dec.: +119.038 mas/yr
Parallax (π)	9.8530±0.0458 mas
Distance	331 ± 2 ly (101.5 ± 0.5 pc)
Absolute magnitude (M_{V})	+0.82

Details
Mass	1.26±0.09 or 1.12±0.06 M_{☉}
Radius	12.01±0.14 R_{☉}
Luminosity	56.7±1.4 L_{☉}
Surface gravity (log g)	2.34±0.10 cgs
Temperature	4,572±35 K
Metallicity [Fe/H]	+0.01±0.08 dex
Age	4.64±1.01 or 6.50±1.22 Gyr

Other designations
- λ^{2} Scl, CD−39°181, FK5 26, HD 4211, HIP 3456, HR 195, SAO 192703

Database references
SIMBAD	data

Lambda^{2} Sculptoris is an orange-hued star in the southern constellation of Sculptor. On dark nights it is faintly visible to the naked eye, having an apparent visual magnitude of +5.90. Based upon an annual parallax shift of 9.63 mas as measured from Earth, it is located at a distance of 331 light-years. It has a relatively large proper motion, advancing 0.273 arcsecond per year across the sky.

The spectrum of this star matches a spectral class of K1III, with the luminosity class III indicating it is a giant star that has exhausted the hydrogen at its core. It is now fusing helium, being in the evolutionary stage known as the horizontal branch. Estimates of its mass and age give two different values: 1.12 or 1.26 solar masses and 4.64 or 6.50 billion years. It has expanded to 12.01 times the Sun's radius and radiates 56.7 times the solar luminosity from its photosphere at an effective temperature of 4,572 K.
