= Kappa1 Sculptoris =

Binary star in the constellation Sculptor

Kappa^{1} Sculptoris
Observation data Epoch J2000.0 Equinox J2000.0 (ICRS)
- Constellation: Sculptor
- Right ascension: 00^{h} 09^{m} 21.06696^{s}
- Declination: −27° 59′ 16.5322″
- Apparent magnitude (V): +5.51 (6.23 + 6.29)

Characteristics
- Spectral type: F2V (F4 III + F3 III)
- U−B color index: +0.06
- B−V color index: +0.42

Astrometry
Radial velocity (R_{v})	7.7±1.6 km/s
Proper motion (μ)	RA: +70.11 mas/yr Dec.: −8.97 mas/yr
Parallax (π)	12.91±0.72 mas
Distance	250 ± 10 ly (77 ± 4 pc)
Absolute magnitude (M_{V})	2.05

Orbit
Period (P)	616.04 yr
Semi-major axis (a)	1.500″
Eccentricity (e)	0.103
Inclination (i)	98.98°
Longitude of the node (Ω)	81.75°
Periastron epoch (T)	2095.68
Argument of periastron (ω) (secondary)	256.86°

Details

κ^{1} Scl A
Mass	1.8 M_{☉}
Temperature	6,565 K
Rotational velocity (v sin i)	116.8±5.8 km/s

B
Mass	1.8 M_{☉}
Radius	2.3 R_{☉}
Luminosity	12.2 L_{☉}
Temperature	7,111 K

Other designations
- κ^{1} Scl, CD−28°16, HD 493, HIP 761, HR 24, SAO 166083, ADS 111, WDS J00094-2759AB

Database references
SIMBAD	data
- A
- B

Kappa^{1} Sculptoris is a binary star system in the southern constellation of Sculptor. It is faintly visible to the naked eye, with a combined apparent visual magnitude of +5.51. Based upon an annual parallax shift of 12.91 mas as measured from Earth, it is located roughly 250 light years from the Sun.

The pair orbit each other with an estimated period of 616 years, a semimajor axis of 1.5 arc seconds, and an eccentricity of 0.1. Both components are evolved, yellow-white hued, F-type giant stars. The primary, component A, has a visual magnitude of 6.23 and a stellar classification of F4 III. The companion, component B, is magnitude 6.29 and of class F3 III. Their composite spectrum is classified as F2V. The mass ratio is 0.782, meaning the secondary is only 78.2% as massive as the primary. An 18th magnitude companion star lies 73.4 arc seconds distant along a position angle of 243°, as of 1998.
