= Machina Electrica =

Former constellation

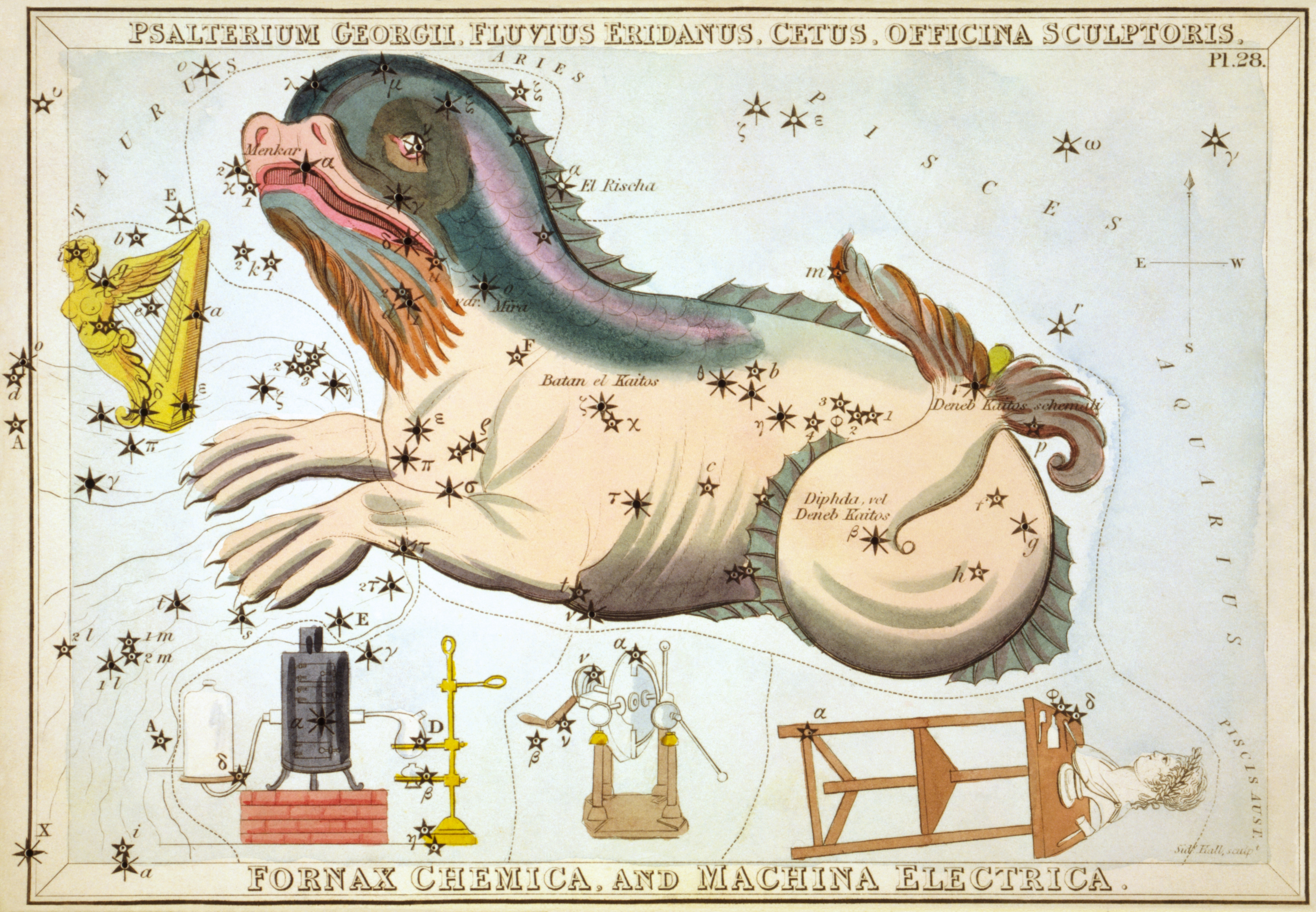
Machina Electrica can be seen below Cetus in this card from Urania's Mirror (1825), between Fornax and Sculptor.

Machina Electrica (Latin for electricity generator) was a constellation created by Johann Bode in 1800. He created it from faint stars between Fornax and Sculptor, to the south of Cetus. It represented an electrostatic generator. The constellation was somewhat popular during the 19th century and had appeared in a number of star charts, but was eventually rendered obsolete when the International Astronomical Union standardized constellation boundaries in 1930 and is now no longer in use.

== See also ==
- Former constellations
