= Cancer in Chinese astronomy =

According to traditional Chinese uranography, the modern constellation Cancer is located within the southern quadrant of the sky, which is symbolized as the Vermilion Bird of the South (南方朱雀, Nán Fāng Zhū Què).

The name of the western constellation in modern Chinese is 巨蟹座 (jù xiè zuò), meaning "the giant crab constellation".

== Stars ==
The map of Chinese constellation in constellation Cancer area consists of:

Four Symbols	Mansion (Chinese name)	Romanization	Translation	Asterisms (Chinese name)	Romanization	Translation	Western star name	Proper Name	Chinese star name	Romanization	Translation
Vermilion Bird of the South (南方朱雀)	井	Jǐng	Well	水位	Shuǐwèi	Water Level					
Vermilion Bird of the South (南方朱雀)	井	Jǐng	Well	水位	Shuǐwèi	Water Level	8 Cnc		水位三	Shuǐwèisān	3rd star
Vermilion Bird of the South (南方朱雀)	井	Jǐng	Well	水位	Shuǐwèi	Water Level	ζ^{1} Cnc	Tegmine (for component A)	水位四	Shuǐwèisì	4th star
Vermilion Bird of the South (南方朱雀)	井	Jǐng	Well	水位	Shuǐwèi	Water Level	μ^{2} Cnc		水位增六	Shuǐwèizēngliù	6th additional star
Vermilion Bird of the South (南方朱雀)	井	Jǐng	Well	水位	Shuǐwèi	Water Level	3 Cnc		水位增七	Shuǐwèizēngqī	7th additional star
Vermilion Bird of the South (南方朱雀)	井	Jǐng	Well	水位	Shuǐwèi	Water Level	5 Cnc		水位增八	Shuǐwèizēngbā	8th additional star
Vermilion Bird of the South (南方朱雀)	井	Jǐng	Well	水位	Shuǐwèi	Water Level	1 Cnc		水位增九	Shuǐwèizēngjiǔ	9th additional star
Vermilion Bird of the South (南方朱雀)	井	Jǐng	Well	水位	Shuǐwèi	Water Level	12 Cnc		水位增十一	Shuǐwèizēngshíyī	11th additional star
Vermilion Bird of the South (南方朱雀)	鬼	Guǐ	Ghost	鬼	Guǐ	Ghost					
Vermilion Bird of the South (南方朱雀)	鬼	Guǐ	Ghost	鬼	Guǐ	Ghost	θ Cnc				
Vermilion Bird of the South (南方朱雀)	鬼	Guǐ	Ghost	鬼	Guǐ	Ghost	θ Cnc		鬼宿一	Guǐsùyī	1st star
Vermilion Bird of the South (南方朱雀)	鬼	Guǐ	Ghost	鬼	Guǐ	Ghost	θ Cnc		鬼宿距星	Guǐsùjùxīng	Separated star
Vermilion Bird of the South (南方朱雀)	鬼	Guǐ	Ghost	鬼	Guǐ	Ghost	θ Cnc		鬼宿西南星	Guǐsùxīnánxīng	Southwestern star
Vermilion Bird of the South (南方朱雀)	鬼	Guǐ	Ghost	鬼	Guǐ	Ghost	θ Cnc		屏南星	Bǐngnánxīng	Star of folding screen in the south
Vermilion Bird of the South (南方朱雀)	鬼	Guǐ	Ghost	鬼	Guǐ	Ghost	η Cnc				
Vermilion Bird of the South (南方朱雀)	鬼	Guǐ	Ghost	鬼	Guǐ	Ghost	η Cnc		鬼宿二	Guǐsùèr	2nd star
Vermilion Bird of the South (南方朱雀)	鬼	Guǐ	Ghost	鬼	Guǐ	Ghost	η Cnc		鬼宿西北星	Guǐsùxīběixīng	Northwestern star
Vermilion Bird of the South (南方朱雀)	鬼	Guǐ	Ghost	鬼	Guǐ	Ghost	γ Cnc	Asellus Borealis			
Vermilion Bird of the South (南方朱雀)	鬼	Guǐ	Ghost	鬼	Guǐ	Ghost	γ Cnc	Asellus Borealis	鬼宿三	Guǐsùsān	3rd star
Vermilion Bird of the South (南方朱雀)	鬼	Guǐ	Ghost	鬼	Guǐ	Ghost	γ Cnc	Asellus Borealis	鬼宿东北星	Guǐsùdōngběixīng	Northeastern star
Vermilion Bird of the South (南方朱雀)	鬼	Guǐ	Ghost	鬼	Guǐ	Ghost	γ Cnc	Asellus Borealis	军井西南星	Jūnjǐngxīnánxīng	Star in the southwest of Military Well constellation
Vermilion Bird of the South (南方朱雀)	鬼	Guǐ	Ghost	鬼	Guǐ	Ghost	δ Cnc	Asellus Australis			
Vermilion Bird of the South (南方朱雀)	鬼	Guǐ	Ghost	鬼	Guǐ	Ghost	δ Cnc	Asellus Australis	鬼宿四	Guǐsùsì	4th star
Vermilion Bird of the South (南方朱雀)	鬼	Guǐ	Ghost	鬼	Guǐ	Ghost	δ Cnc	Asellus Australis	鬼宿东南星	Guǐsùdōngnánxīng	Southeastern star
Vermilion Bird of the South (南方朱雀)	鬼	Guǐ	Ghost	鬼	Guǐ	Ghost	35 Cnc		鬼宿增一	Guǐsùzēngyī	1st additional star
Vermilion Bird of the South (南方朱雀)	鬼	Guǐ	Ghost	鬼	Guǐ	Ghost	20 Cnc		鬼宿增二	Guǐsùzēngèr	2nd additional star
Vermilion Bird of the South (南方朱雀)	鬼	Guǐ	Ghost	鬼	Guǐ	Ghost	25 Cnc		鬼宿增三	Guǐsùzēngsān	3rd additional star
Vermilion Bird of the South (南方朱雀)	鬼	Guǐ	Ghost	鬼	Guǐ	Ghost	29 Cnc		鬼宿增四	Guǐsùzēngsì	4th additional star
Vermilion Bird of the South (南方朱雀)	鬼	Guǐ	Ghost	鬼	Guǐ	Ghost	27 Cnc		鬼宿增五	Guǐsùzēngwǔ	5th additional star
Vermilion Bird of the South (南方朱雀)	鬼	Guǐ	Ghost	鬼	Guǐ	Ghost	45 Cnc		鬼宿增六	Guǐsùzēngliù	6th additional star
Vermilion Bird of the South (南方朱雀)	鬼	Guǐ	Ghost	鬼	Guǐ	Ghost	50 Cnc		鬼宿增七	Guǐsùzēngqī	7th additional star
Vermilion Bird of the South (南方朱雀)	鬼	Guǐ	Ghost	鬼	Guǐ	Ghost	54 Cnc		鬼宿增八	Guǐsùzēngbā	8th additional star
Vermilion Bird of the South (南方朱雀)	鬼	Guǐ	Ghost	鬼	Guǐ	Ghost	52 Cnc		鬼宿增九	Guǐsùzēngjiǔ	9th additional star
Vermilion Bird of the South (南方朱雀)	鬼	Guǐ	Ghost	鬼	Guǐ	Ghost	ο^{1} Cnc		鬼宿增十	Guǐsùzēngshí	10th additional star
Vermilion Bird of the South (南方朱雀)	鬼	Guǐ	Ghost	鬼	Guǐ	Ghost	ο^{2} Cnc		鬼宿增十一	Guǐsùzēngshíyī	11th additional star
Vermilion Bird of the South (南方朱雀)	鬼	Guǐ	Ghost	鬼	Guǐ	Ghost	68 Cnc		鬼宿增十二	Guǐsùzēngshíèr	12th additional star
Vermilion Bird of the South (南方朱雀)	鬼	Guǐ	Ghost	鬼	Guǐ	Ghost	71 Cnc		鬼宿增十三	Guǐsùzēngshísān	13th additional star
Vermilion Bird of the South (南方朱雀)	鬼	Guǐ	Ghost	鬼	Guǐ	Ghost	78 Cnc		鬼宿增十四	Guǐsùzēngshísì	14th additional star
Vermilion Bird of the South (南方朱雀)	鬼	Guǐ	Ghost	鬼	Guǐ	Ghost	83 Cnc		鬼宿增十五	Guǐsùzēngshíwǔ	15th additional star
Vermilion Bird of the South (南方朱雀)	鬼	Guǐ	Ghost	鬼	Guǐ	Ghost	82 Cnc		鬼宿增十六	Guǐsùzēngshíliù	16th additional star
Vermilion Bird of the South (南方朱雀)	鬼	Guǐ	Ghost	鬼	Guǐ	Ghost	25 Cnc		鬼宿增十九	Guǐsùzēngshíjiǔ	19th additional star
Vermilion Bird of the South (南方朱雀)	鬼	Guǐ	Ghost	積尸	Jīshī	Cumulative Corpses					
Vermilion Bird of the South (南方朱雀)	鬼	Guǐ	Ghost	積尸	Jīshī	Cumulative Corpses	M44				
Vermilion Bird of the South (南方朱雀)	鬼	Guǐ	Ghost	積尸	Jīshī	Cumulative Corpses	M44		積尸	Jīshī	(One star of)
Vermilion Bird of the South (南方朱雀)	鬼	Guǐ	Ghost	積尸	Jīshī	Cumulative Corpses	M44		积尸气	Jīshīqì	Cloud of Cumulative Corpses
Vermilion Bird of the South (南方朱雀)	鬼	Guǐ	Ghost	積尸	Jīshī	Cumulative Corpses	M44		天尸	Tiānshī	Celestial corpses
Vermilion Bird of the South (南方朱雀)	鬼	Guǐ	Ghost	積尸	Jīshī	Cumulative Corpses	39 Cnc		積尸增一	Jīshīzēngyī	1st additional star
Vermilion Bird of the South (南方朱雀)	鬼	Guǐ	Ghost	積尸	Jīshī	Cumulative Corpses	42 Cnc		積尸增二	Jīshīzēngèr	2nd additional star
Vermilion Bird of the South (南方朱雀)	鬼	Guǐ	Ghost	積尸	Jīshī	Cumulative Corpses	ε Cnc	Meleph	積尸增三	Jīshīzēngsān	3rd additional star
Vermilion Bird of the South (南方朱雀)	鬼	Guǐ	Ghost	爟	Guàn	Beacon Fire					
Vermilion Bird of the South (南方朱雀)	鬼	Guǐ	Ghost	爟	Guàn	Beacon Fire	ψ Cnc		爟一	Guànyī	1st star
Vermilion Bird of the South (南方朱雀)	鬼	Guǐ	Ghost	爟	Guàn	Beacon Fire	λ Cnc	Piautos (for component A)	爟二	Guànèr	2nd star
Vermilion Bird of the South (南方朱雀)	鬼	Guǐ	Ghost	爟	Guàn	Beacon Fire	φ^{1} Cnc		爟三	Guànsān	3rd star
Vermilion Bird of the South (南方朱雀)	鬼	Guǐ	Ghost	爟	Guàn	Beacon Fire	15 Cnc		爟四	Guànsì	4th star
Vermilion Bird of the South (南方朱雀)	鬼	Guǐ	Ghost	爟	Guàn	Beacon Fire	4 Cnc		爟增一	Guànzēngyī	1st additional star
Vermilion Bird of the South (南方朱雀)	鬼	Guǐ	Ghost	爟	Guàn	Beacon Fire	ω Cnc		爟增二	Guànzēngèr	2nd additional star
Vermilion Bird of the South (南方朱雀)	鬼	Guǐ	Ghost	爟	Guàn	Beacon Fire	11 Cnc		爟增三	Guànzēngsān	3rd additional star
Vermilion Bird of the South (南方朱雀)	鬼	Guǐ	Ghost	爟	Guàn	Beacon Fire	13 Cnc		爟增五	Guànzēngwǔ	5th additional star
Vermilion Bird of the South (南方朱雀)	鬼	Guǐ	Ghost	爟	Guàn	Beacon Fire	χ Cnc		爟增六	Guànzēngliù	6th additional star
Vermilion Bird of the South (南方朱雀)	鬼	Guǐ	Ghost	爟	Guàn	Beacon Fire	φ^{2} Cnc		爟增八	Guànzēngbā	8th additional star
Vermilion Bird of the South (南方朱雀)	鬼	Guǐ	Ghost	爟	Guàn	Beacon Fire	24 Cnc		爟增九	Guànzēngjiǔ	9th additional star
Vermilion Bird of the South (南方朱雀)	鬼	Guǐ	Ghost	爟	Guàn	Beacon Fire	28 Cnc		爟增十	Guànzēngshí	10th additional star
Vermilion Bird of the South (南方朱雀)	鬼	Guǐ	Ghost	爟	Guàn	Beacon Fire	υ^{1} Cnc		爟增十一	Guànzēngshíyī	11th additional star
Vermilion Bird of the South (南方朱雀)	柳	Liǔ	Willow	柳	Liǔ	Willow					
Vermilion Bird of the South (南方朱雀)	柳	Liǔ	Willow	柳	Liǔ	Willow	κ Cnc		柳宿增二	Liǔsùzēngèr	2nd additional star
Vermilion Bird of the South (南方朱雀)	柳	Liǔ	Willow	柳	Liǔ	Willow	α Cnc	Acubens (for component A)	柳宿增三	Liǔsùzēngsān	3rd additional star
Vermilion Bird of the South (南方朱雀)	柳	Liǔ	Willow	柳	Liǔ	Willow	60 Cnc		柳宿增四	Liǔsùzēngsì	4th additional star
Vermilion Bird of the South (南方朱雀)	柳	Liǔ	Willow	柳	Liǔ	Willow	49 Cnc		柳宿增五	Liǔsùzēngwǔ	5th additional star
Vermilion Bird of the South (南方朱雀)	柳	Liǔ	Willow	柳	Liǔ	Willow	37 Cnc		柳宿增六	Liǔsùzēngliù	6th additional star
Vermilion Bird of the South (南方朱雀)	柳	Liǔ	Willow	柳	Liǔ	Willow	36 Cnc		柳宿增七	Liǔsùzēngqī	7th additional star
Vermilion Bird of the South (南方朱雀)	柳	Liǔ	Willow	柳	Liǔ	Willow	34 Cnc		柳宿增八	Liǔsùzēngbā	8th additional star
Vermilion Bird of the South (南方朱雀)	柳	Liǔ	Willow	柳	Liǔ	Willow	21 Cnc		柳宿增九	Liǔsùzēngjiǔ	9th additional star
Vermilion Bird of the South (南方朱雀)	柳	Liǔ	Willow	柳	Liǔ	Willow	β Cnc	Tarf	柳宿增十	Liǔsùzēngshí	10th additional star
Vermilion Bird of the South (南方朱雀)	柳	Liǔ	Willow	柳	Liǔ	Willow	HD 69478		鬼宿增十一	Liǔsùzēngshíyī	11th additional star
Vermilion Bird of the South (南方朱雀)	星	Xīng	Star	軒轅	Xuānyuán	Xuānyuán					
Vermilion Bird of the South (南方朱雀)	星	Xīng	Star	軒轅	Xuānyuán	Xuānyuán	66 Cnc		軒轅增四	Xuānyuánzēngsì	4th additional star
Vermilion Bird of the South (南方朱雀)	星	Xīng	Star	軒轅	Xuānyuán	Xuānyuán	σ^{3} Cnc		軒轅增五	Xuānyuánzēngwǔ	5th additional star
Vermilion Bird of the South (南方朱雀)	星	Xīng	Star	軒轅	Xuānyuán	Xuānyuán	σ^{2} Cnc		軒轅增六	Xuānyuánzēngliù	6th additional star
Vermilion Bird of the South (南方朱雀)	星	Xīng	Star	軒轅	Xuānyuán	Xuānyuán	σ^{1} Cnc		軒轅增七	Xuānyuánzēngqī	7th additional star
Vermilion Bird of the South (南方朱雀)	星	Xīng	Star	軒轅	Xuānyuán	Xuānyuán	HD 73508		軒轅增九	Xuānyuánzēngjiǔ	9th additional star
Vermilion Bird of the South (南方朱雀)	星	Xīng	Star	軒轅	Xuānyuán	Xuānyuán	HD 73427		軒轅增十	Xuānyuánzēngshí	10th additional star
Vermilion Bird of the South (南方朱雀)	星	Xīng	Star	軒轅	Xuānyuán	Xuānyuán	46 Cnc		軒轅增十一	Xuānyuánzēngshíyī	11th additional star
Vermilion Bird of the South (南方朱雀)	星	Xīng	Star	軒轅	Xuānyuán	Xuānyuán	57 Cnc		軒轅增十二	Xuānyuánzēngshíèr	12th additional star
Vermilion Bird of the South (南方朱雀)	星	Xīng	Star	軒轅	Xuānyuán	Xuānyuán	61 Cnc		軒轅增十三	Xuānyuánzēngshísān	13th additional star
Vermilion Bird of the South (南方朱雀)	星	Xīng	Star	軒轅	Xuānyuán	Xuānyuán	τ Cnc		軒轅增十四	Xuānyuánzēngshísì	14th additional star
Vermilion Bird of the South (南方朱雀)	星	Xīng	Star	軒轅	Xuānyuán	Xuānyuán	75 Cnc		軒轅增十五	Xuānyuánzēngshíwǔ	15th additional star
Vermilion Bird of the South (南方朱雀)	星	Xīng	Star	軒轅	Xuānyuán	Xuānyuán	70 Cnc		軒轅增十六	Xuānyuánzēngshíliù	16th additional star
Vermilion Bird of the South (南方朱雀)	星	Xīng	Star	軒轅	Xuānyuán	Xuānyuán	67 Cnc		軒轅增十七	Xuānyuánzēngshíqī	17th additional star
Vermilion Bird of the South (南方朱雀)	星	Xīng	Star	軒轅	Xuānyuán	Xuānyuán	ρ^{2} Cnc		軒轅增十八	Xuānyuánzēngbā	18th additional star
Vermilion Bird of the South (南方朱雀)	星	Xīng	Star	軒轅	Xuānyuán	Xuānyuán	ρ^{1} Cnc	Copernicus	軒轅增十九	Xuānyuánzēngjiǔ	19th additional star
Vermilion Bird of the South (南方朱雀)	星	Xīng	Star	軒轅	Xuānyuán	Xuānyuán	53 Cnc		軒轅增二十一	Xuānyuánzēngèrshíyī	21st additional star
Vermilion Bird of the South (南方朱雀)	星	Xīng	Star	軒轅	Xuānyuán	Xuānyuán	ι Cnc	Yuyu	軒轅增二十二	Xuānyuánzēngèrshíyī	22nd additional star
Vermilion Bird of the South (南方朱雀)	星	Xīng	Star	軒轅	Xuānyuán	Xuānyuán	ν Cnc		軒轅增二十三	Xuānyuánzēngèrshísān	23rd additional star
Vermilion Bird of the South (南方朱雀)	星	Xīng	Star	軒轅	Xuānyuán	Xuānyuán	ξ Cnc	Nahn (for component A)	軒轅增二十四	Xuānyuánzēngèrshísì	24th additional star
Vermilion Bird of the South (南方朱雀)	星	Xīng	Star	軒轅	Xuānyuán	Xuānyuán	79 Cnc		軒轅增五十八	Xuānyuánzēngwǔshíbā	58th additional star

== See also ==
- Chinese astronomy
- Traditional Chinese star names
- Chinese constellations
