= List of stars in Cancer =

This is the list of notable stars in the constellation Cancer. The 121 stars are sorted by decreasing brightness, beginning with Beta Cancri, the brightest star in Cancer.

Name	B	F	Var	HD	HIP	RA	Dec	vis. mag.	abs. mag.	Dist. (ly)	Sp. class	Notes
β Cnc	β	17		69267	40526	08^{h} 16^{m} 30.95^{s}	+09° 11′ 08.4″	3.53	−1.22	290	K4III	Tarf, Al Tarf; variable star, ΔV = 0.005^{m}, P = 6.01 d, has a planet (b)
δ Cnc	δ	47		74442	42911	08^{h} 44^{m} 41.11^{s}	+18° 09′ 17.5″	3.94	0.84	136	K0III	Asellus Australis
ι Cnc A	ι	48		74739	43103	08^{h} 46^{m} 41.83^{s}	+28° 45′ 36.0″	4.03	−0.77	298	G8IIIa	Yuyu, component of the ι Cnc system
α Cnc	α	65		76756	44066	08^{h} 58^{m} 29.20^{s}	+11° 51′ 28.0″	4.26	0.63	173	A5m	Acubens, Sertan; suspected variable, V_{max} = 4.20^{m}, V_{min} = 4.27^{m}
γ Cnc	γ	43		74198	42806	08^{h} 43^{m} 17.21^{s}	+21° 28′ 06.9″	4.66	1.23	181	A1IV	Asellus Borealis
ζ Cnc	ζ	16		68255; 68256; 68257	40167	08^{h} 12^{m} 12.71^{s}	+17° 38′ 53.3″	4.67	2.63	83	F7V+F9V +G0V+?	Tegmine, quaternary star
HD 71115				71115	41325	08^{h} 25^{m} 54.79^{s}	+07° 33′ 52.3″	5.13	−0.08	359	G8II	double star
8 Cnc		8		66664	39567	08^{h} 05^{m} 04.51^{s}	+13° 07′ 06.1″	5.14	1.09	210	A1V	
χ Cnc	χ	18		69897	40843	08^{h} 20^{m} 03.87^{s}	+27° 13′ 07.0″	5.14	3.84	59	F6V	suspected variable
ξ Cnc	ξ	77		78515	44946	09^{h} 09^{m} 21.53^{s}	+22° 02′ 43.6″	5.16	−0.18	380	K0III	Nahn
ο^{1} Cnc	ο^{1}	62		76543	43970	08^{h} 57^{m} 14.91^{s}	+15° 19′ 21.8″	5.22	1.77	160	A5III	α^{2} CVn variable
ρ^{2} Cnc	ρ^{2}	58		76219	43834	08^{h} 55^{m} 39.69^{s}	+27° 55′ 39.2″	5.23	−1.00	574	G8II-III	
σ^{3} Cnc	σ^{3}	64		76813	44154	08^{h} 59^{m} 32.68^{s}	+32° 25′ 07.1″	5.23	0.27	320	G9III	suspected variable
κ Cnc	κ	76		78316	44798	09^{h} 07^{m} 44.82^{s}	+10° 40′ 05.6″	5.23	−0.63	484	B8IIImnp	α^{2} CVn variable, V_{max} = 5.22^{m}, V_{min} = 5.27^{m}, P = 5.0035 d
μ^{2} Cnc	μ^{2}	10		67228	39780	08^{h} 07^{m} 45.84^{s}	+21° 34′ 55.1″	5.30	3.46	76	G2IV	
θ Cnc	θ	31		72094	41822	08^{h} 31^{m} 35.77^{s}	+18° 05′ 40.4″	5.33	−0.57	494	K5III	suspected variable
η Cnc	η	33		72292	41909	08^{h} 32^{m} 42.52^{s}	+20° 26′ 28.6″	5.33	0.43	312	K3III	
82 Cnc	π^{2}	82		79554	45410	09^{h} 15^{m} 13.88^{s}	+14° 56′ 29.5″	5.36	−1.30	701	K1III	
57 Cnc		57		75959	43721	08^{h} 54^{m} 14.70^{s}	+30° 34′ 45.0″	5.40	0.15	365	G7III	
τ Cnc	τ	72		78235	44818	09^{h} 08^{m} 00.07^{s}	+29° 39′ 15.2″	5.42	0.91	260	G8III	
60 Cnc		60		76351	43851	08^{h} 55^{m} 55.56^{s}	+11° 37′ 33.8″	5.44	−0.82	582	K5III	
σ^{2} Cnc	σ^{2}	59		76398	43932	08^{h} 56^{m} 56.63^{s}	+32° 54′ 38.1″	5.44	1.56	195	A7IV	
ν Cnc	ν	69		77350	44405	09^{h} 02^{m} 44.27^{s}	+24° 27′ 10.6″	5.45	−0.28	457	A0pSi	α^{2} CVn variable, V_{max} = 5.33^{m}, V_{min} = 5.49^{m}, P = 4.20 d
27 Cnc		27	BP	71250	41400	08^{h} 26^{m} 43.95^{s}	+12° 39′ 17.5″	5.56	−1.98	1052	M3III	semiregular variable, V_{max} = 5.41^{m}, V_{min} = 5.75^{m}, P = 40 d
φ^{1} Cnc	φ^{1}	22		71093	41377	08^{h} 26^{m} 27.73^{s}	+27° 53′ 37.9″	5.58	0.15	398	K5III	
3 Cnc		3		65759	39177	08^{h} 00^{m} 47.31^{s}	+17° 18′ 31.4″	5.60	−1.12	721	K3III	
15 Cnc	(ψ)	15	BM	68351	40240	08^{h} 13^{m} 08.87^{s}	+29° 39′ 23.7″	5.62	−1.52	872	B9p SiCr	α^{2} CVn variable, V_{max} = 5.53^{m}, V_{min} = 5.65^{m}, P = 3.31 d, ψ Gem
45 Cnc	A^{1}	45		74228	42795	08^{h} 43^{m} 12.34^{s}	+12° 40′ 51.1″	5.62	−1.87	1028	A3V+...	suspected variable
49 Cnc	b	49	BI	74521	42917	08^{h} 44^{m} 45.04^{s}	+10° 04′ 54.2″	5.63	0.15	408	A1p...	α^{2} CVn variable, V_{max} = 5.58^{m}, V_{min} = 5.71^{m}, P = 6.91 d
σ^{1} Cnc	σ^{1}	51		75698	43584	08^{h} 52^{m} 34.62^{s}	+32° 28′ 26.8″	5.67	1.69	204	A8Vms	suspected variable
ο^{2} Cnc	ο^{2}	63		76582	44001	08^{h} 57^{m} 35.16^{s}	+15° 34′ 52.4″	5.68	2.22	161	F0IV	
υ^{1} Cnc	υ^{1}	30		72041	41816	08^{h} 31^{m} 30.57^{s}	+24° 04′ 52.4″	5.71	1.40	237	F0IIIn	suspected variable
ψ^{2} Cnc	ψ^{2}	14		67767	40023	08^{h} 10^{m} 27.23^{s}	+25° 30′ 29.4″	5.73	2.61	137	G8IV	suspected variable
1 Cnc		1		64960	38848	07^{h} 56^{m} 59.47^{s}	+15° 47′ 25.4″	5.80	0.04	462	K3III	
HD 69994				69994	40866	08^{h} 20^{m} 20.93^{s}	+20° 44′ 52.2″	5.80	−0.17	510	K1III	
HD 77445				77445	44406	09^{h} 02^{m} 44.82^{s}	+07° 17′ 53.7″	5.85	−0.69	664	K3III:	suspected variable
ω^{1} Cnc	ω^{1}	2		65714	39191	08^{h} 00^{m} 55.87^{s}	+25° 23′ 34.2″	5.87	−1.82	660	G8III:	
50 Cnc	A^{2}	50		74873	43121	08^{h} 46^{m} 56.06^{s}	+12° 06′ 36.3″	5.89	1.96	199	A1V	
66 Cnc		66		77104	44307	09^{h} 01^{m} 24.13^{s}	+32° 15′ 08.3″	5.89	−0.08	509	A2V	
HD 72945				72945	42172	08^{h} 35^{m} 51.05^{s}	+06° 37′ 13.9″	5.91	3.79	87	F8V	Binary star with a co-moving companion
λ Cnc	λ	19		70011	40881	08^{h} 20^{m} 32.15^{s}	+24° 01′ 20.5″	5.92	0.37	419	B9.5V	Piautos
36 Cnc	c	36		73143	42265	08^{h} 37^{m} 05.79^{s}	+09° 39′ 20.1″	5.92	0.17	461	A3V	suspected eclipsing binary
20 Cnc	d^{1}	20		70569	41117	08^{h} 23^{m} 21.87^{s}	+18° 19′ 56.2″	5.94	0.52	395	A9V	
29 Cnc		29		71555	41578	08^{h} 28^{m} 37.35^{s}	+14° 12′ 39.1″	5.94	1.07	308	A5V	
75 Cnc		75		78418	44892	09^{h} 08^{m} 47.42^{s}	+26° 37′ 48.0″	5.95	3.47	102	G5IV	
1 LMi		(1)		73192	42365	08^{h} 38^{m} 19.00^{s}	+32° 48′ 07.3″	5.96	0.70	367	K2III:	
55 Cnc A	ρ^{1}	55		75732	43587	08^{h} 52^{m} 36.13^{s}	+28° 19′ 53.0″	5.96	5.47	41	G8V	Copernicus, binary star with 55 Cancri B; has five (six?) planets (b, c, d?, e, f g?)
μ^{1} Cnc	μ^{1}	9	BL	66875	39659	08^{h} 06^{m} 18.40^{s}	+22° 38′ 07.8″	5.97	−0.45	626	M3III	semiregular variable, V_{max} = 5.97^{m}, V_{min} = 6.04^{m}
5 Cnc		5		65873	39236	08^{h} 01^{m} 30.29^{s}	+16° 27′ 19.2″	5.99	0.19	472	B9.5Vn	
HD 68461				68461	40231	08^{h} 12^{m} 59.74^{s}	+16° 30′ 51.7″	6.03	−0.02	528	G8III	
HD 72617				72617	42049	08^{h} 34^{m} 13.35^{s}	+08° 27′ 08.5″	6.04	2.22	189	F3IV	
79 Cnc		79		78715	45033	09^{h} 10^{m} 20.86^{s}	+21° 59′ 47.1″	6.04	0.49	420	G8III	
RS Cnc			RS	78712	45058	09^{h} 10^{m} 38.81^{s}	+30° 57′ 47.6″	6.04	0.61	397	M6S	Technetium star; semiregular variable, V_{max} = 5.33^{m}, V_{min} = 6.94^{m}, P = 242.2 d
HD 65257				65257	38975	07^{h} 58^{m} 31.48^{s}	+16° 31′ 07.3″	6.05	−2.11	1399	K0	suspected variable
HD 65522				65522	39067	07^{h} 59^{m} 35.07^{s}	+13° 14′ 31.9″	6.05	1.22	301	K2	
28 Cnc		28	CX	71496	41574	08^{h} 28^{m} 36.80^{s}	+24° 08′ 42.2″	6.05	1.45	271	F0Vn	δ Sct variable, ΔV = 0.025^{m}, P = 0.096 d
67 Cnc		67		77190	44342	09^{h} 01^{m} 48.88^{s}	+27° 54′ 10.0″	6.07	2.23	191	A8Vn	suspected variable
HD 68099				68099	40085	08^{h} 11^{m} 16.60^{s}	+09° 49′ 16.6″	6.08	−1.06	872	B6III	
21 Cnc		21		70734	41163	08^{h} 23^{m} 55.21^{s}	+10° 37′ 55.6″	6.11	−1.56	1113	M2III	suspected variable
25 Cnc	d^{2}	25		71030	41319	08^{h} 25^{m} 49.99^{s}	+17° 02′ 47.9″	6.11	2.85	147	F6V	
46 Cnc		46		74485	42954	08^{h} 45^{m} 21.42^{s}	+30° 41′ 51.9″	6.12	0.30	477	G5III	
φ^{2} Cnc A	φ^{2}	23		71150	41404	08^{h} 26^{m} 47.08^{s}	+26° 56′ 07.7″	6.14	1.50	276	A3V	component of the φ^{2} Cnc system; suspected variable
HD 80546				80546	45896	09^{h} 21^{m} 27.17^{s}	+32° 54′ 07.9″	6.16	1.22	317	K3III	
HD 76508				76508	43957	08^{h} 57^{m} 08.30^{s}	+17° 08′ 37.8″	6.17	0.82	384	K1III	
φ^{2} Cnc B	φ^{2}	23		71151		08^{h} 26^{m} 47.00^{s}	+26° 56′ 07.0″	6.19	1.55	276	A6V	component of the φ^{2} Cnc system
HD 76629				76629	44010	08^{h} 57^{m} 42.03^{s}	+09° 23′ 16.0″	6.19	−1.15	956	G8III	
HD 66552				66552	39535	08^{h} 04^{m} 45.32^{s}	+18° 50′ 31.4″	6.21	1.40	299	B9V	
HD 66684				66684	39607	08^{h} 05^{m} 37.05^{s}	+27° 31′ 47.1″	6.21	−1.08	934	A0V	suspected variable, V_{max} = 6.16^{m}, V_{min} = 6.21^{m}
4 LMi		(4)		73596	42538	08^{h} 40^{m} 18.31^{s}	+31° 56′ 31.1″	6.21	1.05	350	F5III	suspected variable
HD 67959				67959	40058	08^{h} 10^{m} 58.90^{s}	+14° 37′ 46.3″	6.22	−0.04	581	A1V	
12 Cnc		12		67483	39874	08^{h} 08^{m} 42.44^{s}	+13° 38′ 27.4″	6.25	1.59	278	F3V	
53 Cnc		53	BO	75716	43575	08^{h} 52^{m} 28.60^{s}	+28° 15′ 33.0″	6.25	−0.92	886	M3III	slow irregular variable, V_{max} = 5.9^{m}, V_{min} = 6.37^{m}
61 Cnc		61		76572	44031	08^{h} 57^{m} 58.63^{s}	+30° 14′ 01.5″	6.25	2.75	164	F6V	
HD 72505				72505	42010	08^{h} 33^{m} 45.06^{s}	+13° 15′ 26.7″	6.26	1.40	306	K0III	
HD 69478				69478	40617	08^{h} 17^{m} 31.66^{s}	+08° 51′ 58.8″	6.28	−1.28	1062	G8III	
ε Cnc	ε	41		73731	42556	08^{h} 40^{m} 27.03^{s}	+19° 32′ 41.4″	6.29	0.16	548	Am	Meleph, in Beehive Cluster
HD 65735				65735	39180	08^{h} 00^{m} 48.10^{s}	+19° 48′ 58.4″	6.30	1.18	345	K1III	
FZ Cnc			FZ	76830	44126	08^{h} 59^{m} 10.76^{s}	+18° 08′ 06.1″	6.30	−0.35	697	M4IIIvar	semiregular variable
4 Cnc	ω^{2}	4		65856	39263	08^{h} 01^{m} 43.77^{s}	+25° 05′ 22.0″	6.32	0.00	598	A1V	
HD 72943				72943	42187	08^{h} 36^{m} 07.71^{s}	+15° 18′ 49.3″	6.33	1.77	267	F0IV	
HD 65757				65757	39194	08^{h} 01^{m} 00.79^{s}	+23° 34′ 59.4″	6.34	1.70	276	K1III-IV	
υ^{2} Cnc	υ^{2}	32		72324	41940	08^{h} 33^{m} 00.14^{s}	+24° 05′ 05.7″	6.35	0.80	421	G9III	
54 Cnc		54		75528	43454	08^{h} 51^{m} 01.53^{s}	+15° 21′ 01.7″	6.36	3.35	130	G2IV	
HD 68776				68776	40354	08^{h} 14^{m} 21.01^{s}	+13° 02′ 54.0″	6.39	−0.49	776	G8III	
39 Cnc		39		73665	42516	08^{h} 40^{m} 06.44^{s}	+20° 00′ 28.1″	6.39	0.11	587	K0III	in Beehive Cluster; suspected variable
HD 78175				78175	44768	09^{h} 07^{m} 27.01^{s}	+22° 58′ 51.1″	6.39	2.54	192	F5V	
X Cnc			X	76221	43811	08^{h} 55^{m} 22.88^{s}	+17° 13′ 52.5″	6.40	−3.95	3622	C6,4	semiregular variable, V_{max} = 5.69^{m}, V_{min} = 6.94^{m}, P = 180 d
HD 80064				80064	45614	09^{h} 17^{m} 51.36^{s}	+11° 30′ 04.1″	6.40	0.30	542	A2IV	
HD 75469				75469	43427	08^{h} 50^{m} 45.13^{s}	+18° 49′ 56.1″	6.41	−0.43	762	A2Vs	
HD 69629				69629	40675	08^{h} 18^{m} 14.43^{s}	+15° 40′ 40.6″	6.42	0.56	485	K0	
HD 73710				73710	42549	08^{h} 40^{m} 22.11^{s}	+19° 40′ 11.9″	6.42	−0.41	756	K0III	in Beehive Cluster
ψ^{1} Cnc	ψ^{1}	13		67690	40007	08^{h} 10^{m} 13.12^{s}	+25° 50′ 40.4″	6.44	−1.06	1032	K0	
HD 73599				73599	42462	08^{h} 39^{m} 24.57^{s}	+08° 01′ 03.6″	6.46	0.32	551	K1III	
HD 77660				77660	44574	09^{h} 04^{m} 55.12^{s}	+32° 22′ 37.2″	6.46	1.96	259	A8V	
HD 67542				67542	39958	08^{h} 09^{m} 35.19^{s}	+29° 05′ 35.1″	6.47	−3.93	3928	G0II	
HD 68703				68703	40342	08^{h} 14^{m} 11.14^{s}	+17° 40′ 33.3″	6.47	1.45	329	A0Vne...	
HD 78234				78234	44825	09^{h} 08^{m} 04.21^{s}	+32° 32′ 25.6″	6.47	1.32	349	F2V	
34 Cnc		34		72359	41904	08^{h} 32^{m} 39.87^{s}	+10° 03′ 57.7″	6.48	0.38	541	A1V	suspected variable
HD 78661				78661	44984	09^{h} 09^{m} 46.45^{s}	+11° 33′ 52.3″	6.48	3.60	123	F2p	suspected variable
HD 79248				79248	45272	09^{h} 13^{m} 37.27^{s}	+21° 16′ 59.6″	6.48	0.57	496	A2V	
HD 76908				76908	44148	08^{h} 59^{m} 26.89^{s}	+13° 04′ 27.9″	6.49	−1.50	1294	K5III	
81 Cnc	π^{1}	81		79096	45170	09^{h} 12^{m} 17.87^{s}	+14° 59′ 43.6″	6.49	4.93	67	G9V	
HD 72115				72115	41833	08^{h} 31^{m} 41.31^{s}	+18° 59′ 16.0″	6.50	−0.99	1025	K0	
24 Cnc A		24		71152	41389	08^{h} 26^{m} 39.82^{s}	+24° 32′ 03.7″	6.51	2.11	248	F0III	component of the 24 Cnc system; suspected variable
37 Cnc		37		73316	42353	08^{h} 38^{m} 05.19^{s}	+09° 34′ 28.7″	6.54	1.25	373	A1V	
35 Cnc		35		72779	42133	08^{h} 35^{m} 19.47^{s}	+19° 35′ 24.3″	6.55	0.28	585	G0III	
ι Cnc B	ι	48		74738	43100	08^{h} 46^{m} 40.00^{s}	+28° 45′ 54.6″	6.58	2.77	188	G8II...	component of the ι Cnc system
40 Cnc		40		73666	42523	08^{h} 40^{m} 11.47^{s}	+19° 58′ 16.2″	6.61	0.40	570	A1V	in Beehive Cluster; blue straggler
83 Cnc		83		80218	45699	09^{h} 18^{m} 58.91^{s}	+17° 42′ 20.4″	6.61	3.64	128	F5	
38 Cnc		38	BT	73575	42485	08^{h} 39^{m} 42.68^{s}	+19° 46′ 42.5″	6.66	0.59	531	F0III	in Beehive Cluster; δ Sct variable, ΔV = 0.06^{m}, P = 0.10 d
70 Cnc		70		77557	44512	09^{h} 04^{m} 09.87^{s}	+27° 53′ 53.9″	6.67	0.33	605	A1V	
2 LMi		(2)		73427	42472	08^{h} 39^{m} 31.87^{s}	+32° 30′ 56.2″	6.69	−1.18	1220	K5	
3 LMi		(3)		73508	42503	08^{h} 39^{m} 56.35^{s}	+32° 43′ 38.2″	6.71	0.66	528	K0	
EP Cnc			EP	73819	42600	08^{h} 40^{m} 56.30^{s}	+19° 34′ 49.2″	6.76	0.6	556	A6Vn	in Beehive Cluster; δ Sct variable, ΔV = 0.03^{m}
42 Cnc		42		73785	42578	08^{h} 40^{m} 43.23^{s}	+19° 43′ 09.6″	6.83	0.87	506	A9III	in Beehive Cluster
7 Cnc		7		66347	39447	08^{h} 03^{m} 50.48^{s}	+22° 04′ 14.9″	6.84	0.28	668	K0	
80 Cnc		80		79009	45153	09^{h} 11^{m} 56.93^{s}	+18° 02′ 39.0″	6.87	1.08	470	A0	
11 Cnc		11		67402	39888	08^{h} 08^{m} 49.60^{s}	+27° 28′ 49.5″	6.88	0.15	944	K0III	Double
78 Cnc		78		78479	44918	09^{h} 09^{m} 02.31^{s}	+17° 28′ 10.7″	7.18	0.5	706	K3III	
VZ Cnc			VZ	73857	42594	08^{h} 40^{m} 52.13^{s}	+09° 49′ 27.1″	7.18	1.21	509	A9III	double-mode δ Sct variable, V_{max} = 7.18^{m}, V_{min} = 7.91^{m}, P = 0.18 d
ADS 7284			IP	79969	45617	09^{h} 17^{m} 53.46^{s}	+28° 33′ 37.9″	7.21	6.03	56.28	K3V	BY Dra variable, ΔV = 0.02^{m}, P = 43.4 d
52 Cnc		52		75558	43463	08^{h} 51^{m} 10.83^{s}	+15° 59′ 57.8″	7.38	1.03	607	G5	
68 Cnc		68		77230	44336	09^{h} 01^{m} 43.66^{s}	+17° 04′ 51.8″	7.38		620	A2Vn	
V Cnc			V	70276	40977	08^{h} 21^{m} 42.84^{s}	+17° 17′ 07.2″	7.50			S0-6/6e	Mira variable, V_{max} = 7.5^{m}, V_{min} = 13.9^{m}, P = 270 d
T Cnc			T		43905	08^{h} 56^{m} 40.15^{s}	+19° 50′ 57.0″	7.60			C	semiregular variable, V_{max} = 7.6^{m}, V_{min} = 10.5^{m}, P = 482 d
BU Cnc			BU	73576		08^{h} 39^{m} 44.67^{s}	+19° 16′ 30.8″	7.68	1.44	577	A7Vn	in Beehive Cluster; δ Sct variable, ΔV = 0.03^{m}, P = 0.071 d
BN Cnc			BN	73763		08^{h} 40^{m} 39.24^{s}	+19° 13′ 41.8″	7.80	1.56	577	A9V	in Beehive Cluster; δ Sct variable, ΔV = 0.03^{m}, P = 0.039 d
HD 72490				72490	41997	08^{h} 33^{m} 36.6^{s}	+13° 33′ 03″	7.8		405	G5	has a planet (b)
24 Cnc B		24		71153		08^{h} 26^{m} 40.10^{s}	+24° 32′ 07.0″	7.81				component of the 24 Cnc system
BY Cnc			BY	74050	42705	08^{h} 42^{m} 10.81^{s}	+18° 56′ 03.7″	7.91	2.21	451	A7Vn	in Beehive Cluster; δ Sct variable, ΔV = 0.01^{m}, P = 0.058 d
HD 74028			BX	74028		08^{h} 42^{m} 06.50^{s}	+19° 24′ 40.5″	7.96	1.72	577	A7V	in Beehive Cluster; δ Sct variable, ΔV = 0.02^{m}, P = 0.044 d
44 Cnc		44		74200	42791	08^{h} 43^{m} 08.36^{s}	+18° 09′ 02.0″	8.03	1.29	726	K0	its radius is about 12.11 R_{☉}.
HD 79498				79498	45406	09^{h} 15^{m} 09^{s}	+23° 22′ 32″	8.03	4.72	150	G5	has a planet (b)
71 Cnc		71		77892	44637	09^{h} 05^{m} 45.52^{s}	+17° 23′ 24.5″	8.10	1.53	672	A2	
CY Cnc			CY	73345		08^{h} 38^{m} 37.86^{s}	+19° 59′ 23.1″	8.14	1.88	582	F0V	in Beehive Cluster; δ Sct variable, ΔV = 0.02^{m}, P = 0.1 d
BQ Cnc			BQ	73729		08^{h} 40^{m} 26.75^{s}	+20° 10′ 55.2″	8.19	1.95	577	F2Vn	in Beehive Cluster; δ Sct variable, ΔV = 0.02^{m}, P = 0.074 d
HD 73534				73534	42446	08^{h} 39^{m} 15.80^{s}	+12° 57′ 37.3″	8.24	3.30	316	G5IV	Gakyid; has a planet (b)
BR Cnc			BR	73175	42319	08^{h} 37^{m} 40.71^{s}	+19° 31′ 06.3″	8.26	1.91	608	F0Vn	in Beehive Cluster; δ Sct variable, ΔV = 0.02^{m}, P = 0.038 d
S Cnc			S	74307	42853	08^{h} 43^{m} 56.14^{s}	+19° 02′ 03.0″	8.35	1.03	950	B9.5V+ G8-9III-IV	Algol variable, V_{max} = 8.29^{m}, V_{min} = 10.25^{m}, P = 9.48 d
BW Cnc			BW	73798		08^{h} 40^{m} 52.48^{s}	+20° 15′ 59.5″	8.48	2.24	577	F0Vn	in Beehive Cluster; δ Sct variable, ΔV = 0.01^{m}, P = 0.072 d
TW Cnc			TW	71780		08^{h} 29^{m} 37.32^{s}	+12° 27′ 20.3″	8.49			G8III+...	Algol variable, V_{max} = 8.5^{m}, V_{min} = 8.97^{m}, P = 70.76 d
U Cnc			U	72863		08^{h} 35^{m} 46.29^{s}	+18° 53′ 44.5″	8.50			M2e	Mira variable, V_{max} = 8.5^{m}, V_{min} = 15.5^{m}, P = 306 d
BS Cnc			BS	73450		08^{h} 39^{m} 09.10^{s}	+19° 35′ 32.6″	8.59	2.35	577	A9V	in Beehive Cluster; δ Sct variable, ΔV = 0.02^{m}, P = 0.051 d
R Cnc			R	69243	40534	08^{h} 16^{m} 33.90^{s}	+11° 43′ 35.0″	8.64	-0.36	2060	M6.5-9e	Mira variable, V_{max} = 6.07^{m}, V_{min} = 11.9^{m}, P = 357 d
BV Cnc			BV	73746		08^{h} 40^{m} 32.97^{s}	+19° 11′ 39.6″	8.65	2.41	577	F0V	in Beehive Cluster; δ Sct variable, ΔV = 0.02^{m}, P = 0.21 d
RZ Cnc			RZ	73343	42432	08^{h} 39^{m} 08.54^{s}	+31° 47′ 44.4″	8.67	0.48	1420	K2III	RS CVn variable, V_{max} = 8.67^{m}, V_{min} = 10.03^{m}, P = 21.64 d
HD 74721				74721	43018	08^{h} 45^{m} 59.26^{s}	+13° 15′ 48.6″	8.72			A0V	horizontal branch star
HD 77065				77065	44259	09^{h} 00^{m} 47.0^{s}	+21° 27′ 13″	8.8	6.3	103	G5	has a planet (b)
UU Cnc			UU		39341	08^{h} 02^{m} 30.90^{s}	+15° 10′ 41.9″	8.85			K4III...	β Lyr variable, V_{max} = 8.68^{m}, V_{min} = 9.35^{m}, P = 96.71 d
HIP 41378					41378	08^{h} 26^{m} 28.0^{s}	+10° 04′ 49″	8.9	3.58	378		has six planets (b, c, d, e, f & g)
RX Cnc			RX	68775	40388	08^{h} 14^{m} 43.54^{s}	+24° 44′ 05.3″	9.20	1.92	931	M8	semiregular variable
HD 80653				80653		09^{h} 21^{m} 21.0^{s}	+14° 22′ 05″	9.50		358	G5	semiregular variable
WY Cnc			WY		44349	09^{h} 01^{m} 55.45^{s}	+26° 41′ 22.7″	9.60	5.05	264.6	G5V	RS CVn variable, V_{max} = 9.51^{m}, V_{min} = 10.14^{m}, P = 0.83 d
TX Cnc			TX			08^{h} 40^{m} 01.70^{s}	+18° 59′ 59.5″	9.97	3.55	626	G0-G1V	in Beehive Cluster; W UMa variable, V_{max} = 10^{m}, V_{min} = 10.35^{m}, P = 0.38 d
RU Cnc			RU		42303	08^{h} 37^{m} 30.13^{s}	+23° 33′ 41.6″	10.20	2.97	911	F9V:+...	RS CVn variable, V_{max} = 10.1^{m}, V_{min} = 11.25^{m}, P = 10.17 d
TU Cnc			TU			08^{h} 52^{m} 16.65^{s}	+09° 05′ 18.8″	10.53			A2	Algol variable
SY Cnc			SY			09^{h} 01^{m} 03.32^{s}	+17° 53′ 56.2″	10.60			G8V	Z Cam variable
EX Cnc			EX			08^{h} 51^{m} 34.32^{s}	+11° 51′ 10.5″	10.95	1.34	2720	A7	in Messier 67; δ Sct variable, ΔV = 0.05^{m}, P = 0.049 d
TT Cnc			TT		41936	08^{h} 32^{m} 55.18^{s}	+13° 11′ 28.5″	11.10			F0	RR Lyr variable, V_{max} = 10.93^{m}, V_{min} = 11.57^{m}, P = 0.56 d
ES Cnc			ES			08^{h} 51^{m} 20.79^{s}	+11° 53′ 26.2″	11.16	1.55	2720	F4	in Messier 67; RS CVn variable, V_{max} = 11.16^{m}, V_{min} = 11.28^{m}, P = 1.07 d
HAT-P-31						08^{h} 06^{m} 09^{s}	+26° 25′ 36″	11.66	3.91	1155		has a transiting planet (b)
CU Cnc			CU		41824	08^{h} 31^{m} 37.57^{s}	+19° 23′ 39.4″	11.80	11.58	36.07	M5Ve	Algol variable and flare star, V_{max} = 11.68^{m}, V_{min} = 11.80^{m}, P = 2.77 d
WASP-65						08^{h} 53^{m} 18.0^{s}	+08° 31′ 23″	11.9	4.44	1011	G6	has a transiting planet (b)
SS Cnc			SS			08^{h} 06^{m} 25.60^{s}	+23° 15′ 05.7″	12.11			A8.5	RR Lyr variable, V_{max} = 11.49^{m}, V_{min} = 12.72^{m}, P = 0.37 d
EW Cnc			EW			08^{h} 51^{m} 32.58^{s}	+11° 50′ 40.6″	12.27	2.66	2720	F0	in Messier 67; δ Sct variable, ΔV = 0.02^{m}, P = 0.053 d
HV Cnc			HV			08^{h} 51^{m} 17.99^{s}	+11° 45′ 54.2″	12.73	3.12	2720		in Messier 67; Algol variable
EV Cnc			EV			08^{h} 51^{m} 28.15^{s}	+11° 49′ 27.5″	12.78	3.17	2720	F3	in Messier 67; W UMa variable, ΔV = 0.13^{m}, P = 0.44 d
55 Cnc B	ρ^{1}	55				08^{h} 52^{m} 40.86^{s}	+28° 19′ 58.82″	13.15	12.58	41	M4V	binary star with 55 Cancri A; has two planets (b, c)
AD Cnc			AD			08^{h} 46^{m} 20.10^{s}	+10° 20′ 07.2″	13.10			K0V	W UMa variable, V_{max} = 13.1^{m}, V_{min} = 13.4^{m}, P = 0.28 d
Gliese 299						08^{h} 11^{m} 57.575^{s}	+08° 46′ 22.05″	13.24		22	M4.5 Ve	a red dwarf, 15.5% as massive as the Sun, 17.9% as wide, and has a surface temperature of about 3,050 K.
HAT-P-43						08^{h} 35^{m} 42.0^{s}	+10° 12′ 24″	13.36		1771		has a transiting planet (b)
AH Cnc			AH			08^{h} 51^{m} 37.85^{s}	+11° 50′ 57.1″	13.41	3.8	2720	F7V	in Messier 67; W UMa variable, V_{max} = 13.31^{m}, V_{min} = 13.96^{m}, P = 0.36 d
HU Cnc			HU			08^{h} 51^{m} 13.36^{s}	+11° 51′ 40.1″	13.61	4	2720	G8IV	in Messier 67; RS CVn variable, V_{max} = 13.45^{m}, V_{min} = 13.61^{m}, P = 18.39 d
AC Cnc			AC			08^{h} 44^{m} 27.11^{s}	+12° 52′ 31.9″	13.80			K1-3V	Algol variable and nova-like star, V_{max} = 13.8^{m}, V_{min} = 15.4^{m}, P = 0.30 d
G 9-38			EI			08^{h} 58^{m} 15.19^{s}	+19° 45′ 47.1″			17.2	M5.5V	flare star
YBP 1194						08^{h} 51^{m} 00.81^{s}	+11° 48′ 52.8″	14.61	5	2720	G5V	in Messier 67; Solar analog; has 3 planets
DX Cnc			DX			08^{h} 29^{m} 49.35^{s}	+26° 46′ 33.7″	14.81	17.01	11.82	M6.5V	flare star
AT Cnc			AT			08^{h} 28^{m} 36.93^{s}	+25° 20′ 03.0″	15.2			DAe...	Z Cam variable, V_{max} = 12.57^{m}, V_{min} = 15.2^{m}, P = 0.20 d
LHS 2090						09^{h} 00^{m} 23.59^{s}	+21° 50′ 05.4″	16.10	17.08	20.782	M6.5V	
YZ Cnc			YZ			08^{h} 10^{m} 56.65^{s}	+28° 08′ 33.5″	16.3				SU UMa variable, V_{max} = 10.5^{m}, V_{min} = 16.3^{m}, P = 0.087 d
EG Cnc			EG			08^{h} 43^{m} 03.99^{s}	+27° 51′ 49.7″	17.0				Huruhata's Variable; WZ Sge variable, V_{max} = 11.9^{m}, V_{min} = 17.0^{m}, P = 0.060 d
DW Cnc			DW			07^{h} 58^{m} 53.05^{s}	+16° 16′ 45.2″	17.5			O...	dwarf nova, V_{max} = 11.36^{m}, V_{min} = 17.5^{m}, P = 0.0060 d
AZ Cnc			AZ			08^{h} 40^{m} 29.75^{s}	+18° 14′ 09.2″	17.59	16.86	45.7	M6.0V	flare star
GY Cnc			GY			09^{h} 09^{m} 50.55^{s}	+18° 49′ 47.5″	17.8				dwarf nova and eclipsing binary, V_{max} = 12.5^{m}, V_{min} = 17.8^{m}, P = 0.18 d
AR Cnc			AR			09^{h} 22^{m} 07.55^{s}	+31° 03′ 14.5″	18.7				dwarf nova and Algol variable, V_{max} = 15.3^{m}, V_{min} = 18.7^{m}, P = 0.21 d
RX J0806.3+1527			HM			08^{h} 06^{m} 22.95^{s}	+15° 27′ 31.1″			160		AM Canum Venaticorum star
AK Cnc			AK			08^{h} 55^{m} 21.18^{s}	+11° 18′ 15.3″					SU UMa variable
CC Cnc			CC			08^{h} 36^{m} 19.15^{s}	+21° 21′ 05.3″				K0V	SU UMa variable
PSR B0823+26						08^{h} 26^{m} 51.44^{s}	+26° 37′ 22.8″					pulsar
Table legend: • Name = Proper name • B = Bayer designation • F or/and G. = Flamsteed designation or Gould designation • Var = Variable-star designation • HD = Henry Draper Catalogue designation number • HIP = Hipparcos Catalogue designation number • RA = Right ascension for the Epoch/Equinox J2000.0 • Dec = Declination for the Epoch/Equinox J2000.0 • vis. mag. = visual magnitude (m or m_{v}), also known as apparent magnitude • abs. mag. = absolute magnitude (M_{v}) • Dist. (ly) = Distance in light-years from Earth • Sp. class = Spectral class of the star in the stellar classification system • Notes = Common name(s) or alternate name(s); comments; notable properties [for example: multiple star status, range of variability if it is a variable star, exoplanets, etc.]

== See also ==
- Lists of stars by constellation

== Bibliography ==
- ESA (1997). "The Hipparcos and Tycho Catalogues".
- Kostjuk, N. D. (2002). "HD-DM-GC-HR-HIP-Bayer-Flamsteed Cross Index".
- Roman, N. G. (1987). "Identification of a Constellation from a Position".
- Gould, B. A. "Uranometria Argentina". Reprinted and updated by Pilcher, F. Archived from the original on 27 February 2012.
- Samus, N. N.; Durlevich, O. V.; et al. (2004). "Combined General Catalogue of Variable Stars (GCVS4.2)".
- Samus, N. N.; Durlevich, O. V.; et al. (2012). "General Catalog of Variable Stars (GCVS database, version 2012Feb)".
- "AAVSO Website". American Association of Variable Star Observers.
- "Naming Stars".
