= Sigma Cancri =

The Bayer designation Sigma Cancri (σ Cnc / σ Cancri) is shared by three star systems, in the constellation Cancer:

- σ^{1} Cancri, which has the Flamsteed designation 51 Cancri
- σ^{2} Cancri, which has the Flamsteed designation 59 Cancri
- σ^{3} Cancri, which has the Flamsteed designation 64 Cancri

The above correspondence between Flamsteed and Bayer designations is the modern one, which is based on the Atlas Coelestis Novus, published by Eduard Heis in 1872. An alternate correspondence sometimes encountered, for instance in the 1835 astronomical catalogue of Thomas Brisbane, is:

- σ^{1} Cancri = 46 Cancri
- σ^{2} Cancri = 57 Cancri
- σ^{3} Cancri = 61 Cancri

Johann Bayer's Uranometria places the sigma between these two groups of stars, making proper association uncertain.

In Johann Bode’s Uranographia, the former is recognised as Sigma Cancri, but with 66 Cancri designated as σ^{4}. Ths designation is seldom used nowadays.
