= Omega Cancri =

The Bayer designation ω Cancri (Omega Cancri) is shared by two stars in the constellation Cancer:

- ω^{1} Cancri or 2 Cancri, commonly called simply ω Cancri.
- ω^{2} Cancri or 4 Cancri.
