= 5 Cancri =

Star in the constellation Cancer

Observation data Epoch J2000.0 Equinox J2000.0
- Constellation: Cancer
- Right ascension: 08^{h} 01^{m} 30.28830^{s}
- Declination: +16° 27′ 19.1191″
- Apparent magnitude (V): 5.99

Characteristics
- Evolutionary stage: main sequence
- Spectral type: B9.5 Vn
- B−V color index: −0.024±0.003

Astrometry
Radial velocity (R_{v})	−10.0±1.5 km/s
Proper motion (μ)	RA: +4.12 mas/yr Dec.: −5.43 mas/yr
Parallax (π)	6.2251±0.1419 mas
Distance	520 ± 10 ly (161 ± 4 pc)
Absolute magnitude (M_{V})	−0.09

Details
Mass	2.93±0.10 M_{☉}
Radius	3.1 R_{☉}
Luminosity	121.1+20.2 −17.3 L_{☉}
Surface gravity (log g)	4.5 cgs
Temperature	9,727+90 −89 K
Rotational velocity (v sin i)	188 km/s
Age	36 Myr

Other designations
- 5 Cnc, BD+16°1612, HD 65873, HIP 39236, HR 3134, SAO 97485

Database references
SIMBAD	data

5 Cancri is a single star in the zodiac constellation of Cancer, located around 520 light years away from the Sun. It is just visible to the naked eye under good seeing conditions as a dim, blue-white hued star with an apparent visual magnitude of 5.99. This object is moving closer to the Sun with a heliocentric radial velocity of −10 km/s.

At one point this was thought to be a spectroscopic binary system. It is a Be star with a weak circumstellar disk of gas that has around three times the radius of the host star. The stellar classification of 5 Cancri is B9.5 Vn, matching a B-type main-sequence star with "nebulous" lines due to rapid rotation. It is 36 million years old with a high projected rotational velocity of 188 km/s. The star has 2.9 times the mass of the Sun and about 3.1 times the Sun's radius. It is radiating 121 times the Sun's luminosity from its photosphere at an effective temperature of 9,727 K.

== See also ==
- Cancer (Chinese astronomy)
- List of stars in Cancer
