= 38 Cancri =

Star in the constellation Cancer

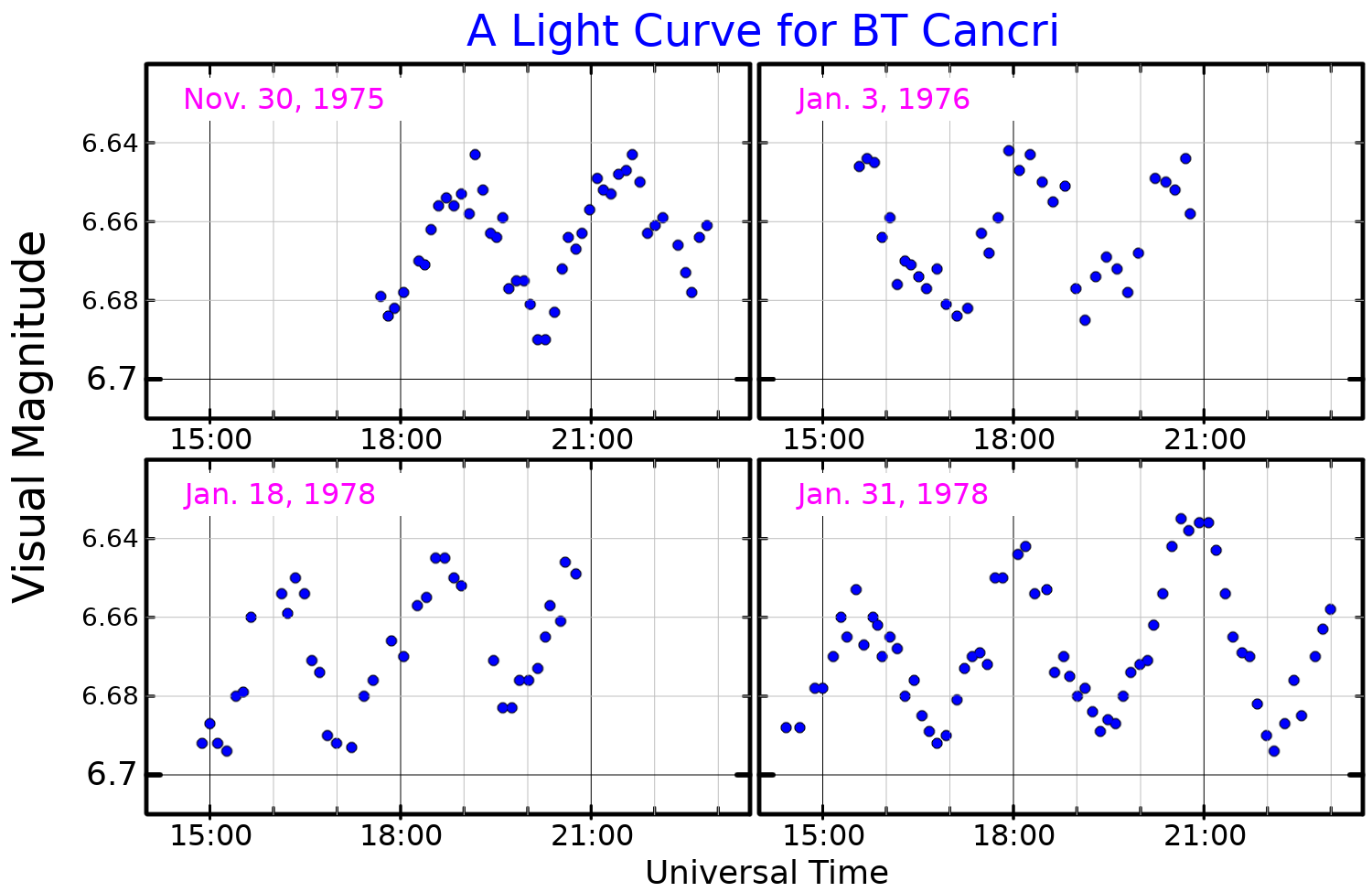
- A visual band light curve for BT Cancri, plotted from data published by Gupta (1979)

Observation data Epoch J2000.0 Equinox ICRS
- Constellation: Cancer
- Right ascension: 08^{h} 39^{m} 42.65445^{s}
- Declination: +19° 46′ 42.4386″
- Apparent magnitude (V): 6.65

Characteristics
- Evolutionary stage: main sequence
- Spectral type: F0 IV
- B−V color index: 0.248±0.010
- Variable type: δ Sct

Astrometry
Radial velocity (R_{v})	+32.0±2.0 km/s
Proper motion (μ)	RA: −36.879 mas/yr Dec.: −13.103 mas/yr
Parallax (π)	5.3700±0.0705 mas
Distance	607 ± 8 ly (186 ± 2 pc)
Absolute magnitude (M_{V})	0.36

Details
Mass	1.786 M_{☉}
Radius	1.834 R_{☉}
Luminosity	59.31 L_{☉}
Surface gravity (log g)	2.92±0.20 cgs
Temperature	7300±200 K
Metallicity [Fe/H]	−0.16±0.10 dex
Rotation	0.670 d
Rotational velocity (v sin i)	138.5 km/s

Other designations
- 38 Cnc, BT Cancri, BD+20°2149, HD 73575, HIP 42485, SAO 98006

Database references
SIMBAD	data

38 Cancri is a variable star in the zodiac constellation Cancer, located around 607 light years from the Sun. This object has the variable star designation BT Cancri; 38 Cancri is the Flamsteed designation. It is a member of the Praesepe cluster but is a challenge to view with the naked eye, having an apparent visual magnitude of 6.65. The star is moving closer to the Earth with a heliocentric radial velocity of +32 km/s.

This is an evolving subgiant star with a stellar classification of F0 IV. It was found to be a pulsating variable by Michel Breger in 1970 and is classed as a Delta Scuti variable. The star displays a pattern of variation showing up to 22 different frequencies, with three being dominant. The brightness varies by up to 0.07 in magnitude. The star has a magnetic field with a computed longitudinal field strength of −215±149 G. It has 1.8 times the mass of the Sun and 1.8 times the Sun's radius. The star is radiating 59 times the Sun's luminosity from its photosphere at an effective temperature of around 7,300 K.
