= 71 Cancri =

A-type star in the constellation Cancer

Observation data Epoch J2000 Equinox J2000
- Constellation: Cancer
- Right ascension: 09^{h} 05^{m} 45.5256^{s}
- Declination: +17° 23′ 24.464″
- Apparent magnitude (V): 8.1

Characteristics
- Evolutionary stage: main sequence
- Spectral type: A2

Astrometry
Radial velocity (R_{v})	28.35±0.38 km/s
Proper motion (μ)	RA: −28.352 mas/yr Dec.: −8.141 mas/yr
Parallax (π)	3.6905±0.0292 mas
Distance	884 ± 7 ly (271 ± 2 pc)
Absolute magnitude (M_{V})	+1.59

Details
Mass	2.161+0.044 −0.041 M_{☉}
Radius	2.96±0.07 R_{☉}
Luminosity	33.3+0.9 −0.7 L_{☉}
Surface gravity (log g)	3.777+0.028 −0.044 cgs
Temperature	8051±91 K
Age	749+100 −102 Myr

Other designations
- 71 Cnc, BD+17 2004, HD 77892, HIP 44637, SAO 98358, TIC 330687375, TYC 1401-1139-1, GSC 01401-01139, 2MASS J09054552+1723244, Gaia DR3 611251121272814464

Database references
SIMBAD	data

71 Cancri is a star in the constellation Cancer. Its spectral classification A2 indicates that it is an A-type star but the luminosity class is not specified. Parallax measurements imply a distance of 271 parsecs (880 ly), and it is drifting further away at a speed of 28 km/s. Being apparent magnitude 8.1, it is not visible to the naked eye.

This A-type star is estimated to be 750 million years old (16% Solar System age). It has a mass roughly 2.2 times the mass of the Sun and an enlarged radius three times that of the Sun. 71 Cancri is 33 times more luminous and 40% hotter, with a surface effective temperature of 8,051 K. Its apparent brightness is diminished by 0.02 magnitudes due to interveining gas and dust between Earth and the star.
