= 7 Cancri =

Star in the constellation Cancer

Observation data Epoch J2000 Equinox J2000
- Constellation: Cancer
- Right ascension: 08^{h} 03^{m} 50.47881^{s}
- Declination: +22° 04′ 14.8926″
- Apparent magnitude (V): 6.84

Characteristics
- Evolutionary stage: red giant branch
- Spectral type: gK3

Astrometry
Radial velocity (R_{v})	1.90 km/s
Proper motion (μ)	RA: −40.866 mas/yr Dec.: −5.129 mas/yr
Parallax (π)	5.8616±0.0215 mas
Distance	556 ± 2 ly (170.6 ± 0.6 pc)
Absolute magnitude (M_{V})	+0.32

Details
Mass	3.2 M_{☉}
Radius	13 R_{☉}
Luminosity	75 L_{☉}
Surface gravity (log g)	2.5 cgs
Temperature	4,711 K
Metallicity [Fe/H]	+0.02 dex
Age	318 Myr

Other designations
- BD+22°1845, HD 66347, HIP 39447, SAO 79903

Database references
SIMBAD	data

7 Cancri (7 Cnc) is a giant star in the constellation Cancer. Its apparent magnitude is 6.84 and it is about 556 ly away.

The annual parallax of 7 Cancri determined from the Hipparcos satellite mission is 488±0.56 mas, giving a distance of 202 pc with an 11.5% margin of error. The more recent and more accurate Gaia Data Release 3 contains a parallax of 5.8616±0.0215 mas, resulting in a closer distance of 171±1 pc. Based on the Gaia distance, 7 Cancri has a bolometric luminosity 75 times that of the sun. Its temperature, based on its colour, is calculated to be 4,711 K and the resulting radius is 13 R_{☉}.

7 Cancri is a cool giant star. It has evolved away from the main sequence after exhausting its core hydrogen and expanded so that it is larger and more luminous than the sun, although cooler. It is one of 220 Flamsteed stars that are too faint to have been included in the Bright Star Catalogue.
