= Omega1 Cancri =

Star in the constellation Cancer

Omega^{1} Cancri
Observation data Epoch J2000.0 Equinox J2000.0 (ICRS)
- Constellation: Cancer
- Right ascension: 08^{h} 00^{m} 55.873^{s}
- Declination: +25° 23′ 34.21″
- Apparent magnitude (V): 5.85

Characteristics
- Evolutionary stage: horizontal branch
- Spectral type: G8 III
- U−B color index: +0.88
- B−V color index: +1.02

Astrometry
Radial velocity (R_{v})	+1.90 km/s
Proper motion (μ)	RA: +16.663 mas/yr Dec.: +7.197 mas/yr
Parallax (π)	5.3076±0.0367 mas
Distance	615 ± 4 ly (188 ± 1 pc)
Absolute magnitude (M_{V})	−2.27

Details
Mass	3.70+0.04 −1.11 M_{☉}
Radius	17.09+0.17 −0.09 R_{☉}
Luminosity	165.1±2.2 L_{☉}
Surface gravity (log g)	2.461+0.005 −0.008 cgs
Temperature	4,941+4 −11 K
Metallicity [Fe/H]	+0.15±0.19 dex
Age	217+344 −17 Myr

Other designations
- ω^{1} Cnc, 2 Cancri, BD+25°1812, FK5 1211, GC 10844, HD 65714, HIP 39191, HR 3124, SAO 79861

Database references
SIMBAD	data

Omega^{1} Cancri is a yellow-hued star in the zodiac constellation of Cancer. Its name is a Bayer designation that is Latinized from ω^{1} Cancri, and abbreviated Omega^{1} Cnc or ω^{1} Cancri. This is a faint star near the lower limit of visibility to the naked eye, having an apparent visual magnitude of 5.85. Based upon an annual parallax shift of 5.31 mas as seen from Earth, this system is 615 light-years (188 pc) away from the Sun. At that distance, the visual magnitude of the star is diminished by an extinction factor of 0.10 due to interstellar dust. It is receding from the Sun with a radial velocity of +2 km/s.

At an estimated age of 217 million years, this is an evolved G-type giant with a stellar classification of G8 III. With the supply of hydrogen at its core exhausted, the star has cooled and expanded to 17 times the girth of the Sun. It has 3.7 times the mass of the Sun and is radiating 165 times the solar luminosity from its photosphere at an effective temperature of 4,941 K. The surface metallicity of this star – what astronomers term the abundance of elements other than hydrogen and helium – is 41% higher than in the Sun.
