= 8 Cancri =

Star in the constellation Cancer

Observation data Epoch J2000 Equinox ICRS
- Constellation: Cancer
- Right ascension: 08^{h} 05^{m} 04.48834^{s}
- Declination: +13° 07′ 05.5757″
- Apparent magnitude (V): +5.14

Characteristics
- Spectral type: A1 V
- B−V color index: 0.018±0.005

Astrometry
Radial velocity (R_{v})	+21.0±4.2 km/s
Proper motion (μ)	RA: −35.78 mas/yr Dec.: −63.81 mas/yr
Parallax (π)	15.20±0.32 mas
Distance	215 ± 5 ly (66 ± 1 pc)
Absolute magnitude (M_{V})	1.05

Details
Mass	2.37 M_{☉}
Luminosity	36.6 L_{☉}
Surface gravity (log g)	4.29±0.14 cgs
Temperature	10,352±352 K
Rotational velocity (v sin i)	173 km/s
Age	144 Myr

Other designations
- 8 Cnc, BD+13°1831, FK5 2625, GC 10959, HD 66664, HIP 39567, HR 3163, SAO 97542

Database references
SIMBAD	data

8 Cancri is a single, white-hued star in the zodiac constellation of Cancer. It has an apparent visual magnitude of +5.14, which indicates it is faintly visible to the naked eye under suitable viewing conditions. The distance to this star, as determined from its annual parallax shift of 15.20 mas, is around 215 light years. A radial velocity of +21 km/s indicates it is moving away from the Sun.

This is an A-type main-sequence star with a stellar classification of A1 V. It is a young star with an estimated age of just 144 million years, and has a high rate of spin with a projected rotational velocity of 173 km/s. 8 Cancri has 2.37 times the mass of the Sun and is radiating 36.6 times the Sun's luminosity from its photosphere at an effective temperature of around 10,352 K.
