= 20 Cancri =

Star in the constellation Cancer

Observation data Epoch J2000.0 Equinox ICRS
- Constellation: Cancer
- Right ascension: 08^{h} 23^{m} 21.84287^{s}
- Declination: +18° 19′ 55.7825″
- Apparent magnitude (V): 5.94

Characteristics
- Evolutionary stage: main sequence
- Spectral type: A9 V
- B−V color index: 0.175

Astrometry
Radial velocity (R_{v})	+35.8±2.9 km/s
Proper motion (μ)	RA: −51.953 mas/yr Dec.: −19.416 mas/yr
Parallax (π)	8.7606±0.0986 mas
Distance	372 ± 4 ly (114 ± 1 pc)
Absolute magnitude (M_{V})	+0.63

Details
Mass	2.41±0.10 M_{☉}
Radius	3.7 R_{☉}
Luminosity	59.9+19.9 −15.0 L_{☉}
Surface gravity (log g)	3.62 cgs
Temperature	7,907±73 K
Metallicity [Fe/H]	−0.30 dex
Rotational velocity (v sin i)	50 km/s
Age	700 Myr

Other designations
- d^{1} Cnc, 20 Cnc, BD+18°1930, FK5 1220, HD 70569, HIP 41117, HR 3284, SAO 97781

Database references
SIMBAD	data

20 Cancri is an astrometric binary star system in the constellation Cancer, located about 372 light-years away from the Sun. This system has the Bayer designation d^{1} Cancri; 20 Cancri is the Flamsteed designation. It is just visible to the naked eye under good viewing conditions, appearing as a dim, white-hued star with an apparent visual magnitude of 5.94. The pair are moving further from the Earth with a heliocentric radial velocity of +36 km/s, and are members of the Hyades Supercluster.

The visible component of this system is an ordinary A-type main-sequence star with a stellar classification of A9 V, which indicates it is generating energy by hydrogen fusion at its core. It has 2.4 times the mass of the Sun and is radiating 60 times the Sun's luminosity from its photosphere at an effective temperature of 7,907 K.
