= Chi Cancri =

Binary star system in the constellation Cancer

- Location of χ Cancri (circled in red)

Observation data Epoch J2000.0 Equinox ICRS
- Constellation: Cancer
- Right ascension: 08^{h} 20^{m} 03.861^{s}
- Declination: +27° 13′ 03.74″
- Apparent magnitude (V): 5.14

Characteristics
- Evolutionary stage: main sequence
- Spectral type: F6V
- U−B color index: −0.06
- B−V color index: +0.47

Astrometry
Radial velocity (R_{v})	+32.91±0.08 km/s
Proper motion (μ)	RA: −17.475 mas/yr Dec.: −377.072 mas/yr
Parallax (π)	54.8749±0.0906 mas
Distance	59.44 ± 0.10 ly (18.22 ± 0.03 pc)
Absolute magnitude (M_{V})	3.85

Details
Mass	1.070 M_{☉}
Radius	1.3870±0.0276 R_{☉}
Luminosity	2.4378±0.0341 L_{☉}
Surface gravity (log g)	4.35 cgs
Temperature	6,130±58 K
Metallicity [Fe/H]	−0.26 dex
Rotational velocity (v sin i)	4.2 km/s
Age	5.8 Gyr

Other designations
- χ Cnc, 18 Cancri, BD+27°1589, FK5 1217, GC 11348, GJ 303, HD 69897, HIP 40843, HR 3262, SAO 80104

Database references
SIMBAD	data

Chi Cancri is a candidate astrometric binary star system in the northern zodiac constellation of Cancer. Its name is a Bayer designation that is Latinized from χ Cancri, and abbreviated Chi Cnc or χ Cnc. It has a yellow-white hue and is dimly visible to the naked eye with an apparent visual magnitude of 5.14. The system is located at a distance of 59 light-years (18 pc) from the Sun, based on parallax, and is drifting further away with a radial velocity of +33 km/s. It is estimated to have made its closest approach some 274,000 years ago when it came to within 42 light-years.

The visible component of this system is an F-type main-sequence star with a stellar classification of F6V, where the luminosity class of 'V' indicates it is generating energy through core hydrogen fusion. The star is 5.8 billion years old and is spinning with a projected rotational velocity of just 4.2 km/s. It has about the same mass as the Sun but 1.4 times the Sun's radius. Chi Cancri is radiating 2.4 times the luminosity of the Sun from its photosphere at an effective temperature of 6,130 K. It displays an infrared excess in the 18μm wavelength band, suggesting a circumstellar disk of dusty debris is orbiting the star.
