= 70 Cancri =

Star in the constellation Cancer

Observation data Epoch J2000.0 Equinox ICRS
- Constellation: Cancer
- Right ascension: 09^{h} 04^{m} 09.86704^{s}
- Declination: +27° 53′ 53.9089″
- Apparent magnitude (V): 6.665

Characteristics
- Evolutionary stage: main sequence
- Spectral type: A1V
- U−B color index: +0.05
- B−V color index: +0.00

Astrometry
Radial velocity (R_{v})	−21.0±4.4 km/s
Proper motion (μ)	RA: −1.287 mas/yr Dec.: −1.429 mas/yr
Parallax (π)	5.6109±0.1390 mas
Distance	580 ± 10 ly (178 ± 4 pc)
Absolute magnitude (M_{V})	0.24

Details
Mass	2.39 M_{☉}
Radius	3.13 R_{☉}
Luminosity	69 L_{☉}
Surface gravity (log g)	3.83 cgs
Temperature	9,406 K
Age	867 Gyr

Other designations
- 70 Cnc, BD+28°1683, HD 77557, HIP 44512, HR 3601, SAO 80609

Database references
SIMBAD	data

70 Cancri is a star in the zodiac constellation of Cancer, located around 580 light years from the Sun. It is a challenge to view with the naked eye even under good seeing conditions, having an apparent visual magnitude of 6.7. The star is moving closer to the Earth with a heliocentric radial velocity of -21 km/s, and is expected to come to within 44 light-years in around nine million years. It is an A-type main-sequence star with a stellar classification of A1V. The object has a radius of about 3.1 R_{☉} and is radiating 69 times the Sun's luminosity from its photosphere at an effective temperature of 9,406 K.
