= Nu Cancri =

Binary star system in the constellation Cancer

ν Cancri
- Location of ν Cancri (circled)

Observation data Epoch J2000.0 Equinox J2000.0 (ICRS)
- Constellation: Cancer
- Right ascension: 09^{h} 02^{m} 44.268^{s}
- Declination: +24° 27′ 10.39″
- Apparent magnitude (V): +5.46

Characteristics
- Evolutionary stage: main sequence
- Spectral type: A0 III
- U−B color index: −0.10
- B−V color index: −0.03

Astrometry
Radial velocity (R_{v})	−15.6±0.7 km/s
Proper motion (μ)	RA: −4.801 mas/yr Dec.: −1.621 mas/yr
Parallax (π)	7.2947±0.1477 mas
Distance	447 ± 9 ly (137 ± 3 pc)
Absolute magnitude (M_{V})	+0.05

Orbit
Period (P)	1,401.4 ± 4.8 d (3.837 ± 0.013 yr)
Semi-major axis (a)	≥ 138.3×10^{6} km (0.924 AU)
Eccentricity (e)	0.35±0.17
Periastron epoch (T)	2419687±63 JD
Argument of periastron (ω) (secondary)	264±9°
Semi-amplitude (K_{1}) (primary)	7.7±1.3 km/s

Details

ν Cnc A
Mass	2.12 M_{☉}
Radius	2.73 R_{☉}
Luminosity	125 L_{☉}
Surface gravity (log g)	3.86 cgs
Temperature	10,000 K
Metallicity [Fe/H]	−0.20±0.04 dex
Rotational velocity (v sin i)	18.9±0.4 km/s
Age	498 Myr

Other designations
- ν Cnc, 69 Cancri, BD+25°2029, FK5 2714, HD 77350, HIP 44405, HR 3595, SAO 80595

Database references
SIMBAD	data

Nu Cancri is a binary star system in the zodiac constellation of Cancer. Its name is a Bayer designation that is Latinised from ν Cancri, and abbreviated Nu Cnc or ν Cnc. This star is faintly visible to the naked eye with an apparent visual magnitude of +5.46. Based upon an annual parallax shift of 8.31 mas as seen from the Earth, the star is located roughly 447 light-years (137 pc) away from the Sun. It is drifting closer with a line of sight velocity of −16 km/s.

The binary nature of this system was announced in 1973. This is a single-lined spectroscopic binary system with an orbital period of 3.8 years and an eccentricity of 0.35. The primary, component A, is a white-hued A-type star with a stellar classification of A0 III. It is a magnetic Ap star with a field strength of 846×10^{−4} T, showing abundance peculiarities in strontium, chromium and mercury. This has been studied as a mercury-manganese star that has reached the end of its main sequence lifetime, although it has an unusually low abundance of mercury for a star of this type. The star has 2.8 times the mass of the Sun and is radiating 93 times the Sun's luminosity from its photosphere at an effective temperature of 10,250 K.
