= 49 Cancri =

Star in the constellation Cancer

- Location of 49 Cancri (circled)

Observation data Epoch J2000.0 Equinox ICRS
- Constellation: Cancer
- Right ascension: 08^{h} 44^{m} 45.03571^{s}
- Declination: +10° 04′ 54.0073″
- Apparent magnitude (V): 5.58 - 5.71

Characteristics
- Evolutionary stage: Main sequence
- Spectral type: A1VpHgMnSiEu
- B−V color index: −0.069
- Variable type: α^{2} CVn

Astrometry
Radial velocity (R_{v})	+27.50 km/s
Proper motion (μ)	RA: −14.686 mas/yr Dec.: −18.466 mas/yr
Parallax (π)	6.5062±0.0748 mas
Distance	501 ± 6 ly (154 ± 2 pc)
Absolute magnitude (M_{V})	+0.07

Details
Mass	3.011 M_{☉}
Radius	2.909 R_{☉}
Luminosity	102 L_{☉}
Surface gravity (log g)	3.964 cgs
Temperature	10,615 K
Metallicity [Fe/H]	+0.013 dex
Rotation	6.907 d
Rotational velocity (v sin i)	21 km/s
Age	263 Myr

Other designations
- b Cnc, 49 Cnc, BI Cnc, BD+10°1864, FK5 2688, HD 74521, HIP 42917, HR 3465, SAO 98089

Database references
SIMBAD	data

49 Cancri is a single star in the zodiac constellation of Cancer, located 501 light years away from the Sun. It has the Bayer designation b Cancri; 49 Cancri is the Flamsteed designation. It is visible to the naked eye as a faint star with an apparent visual magnitude of about 5.6. It is moving away from the Earth with a heliocentric radial velocity of +27.5 km/s.

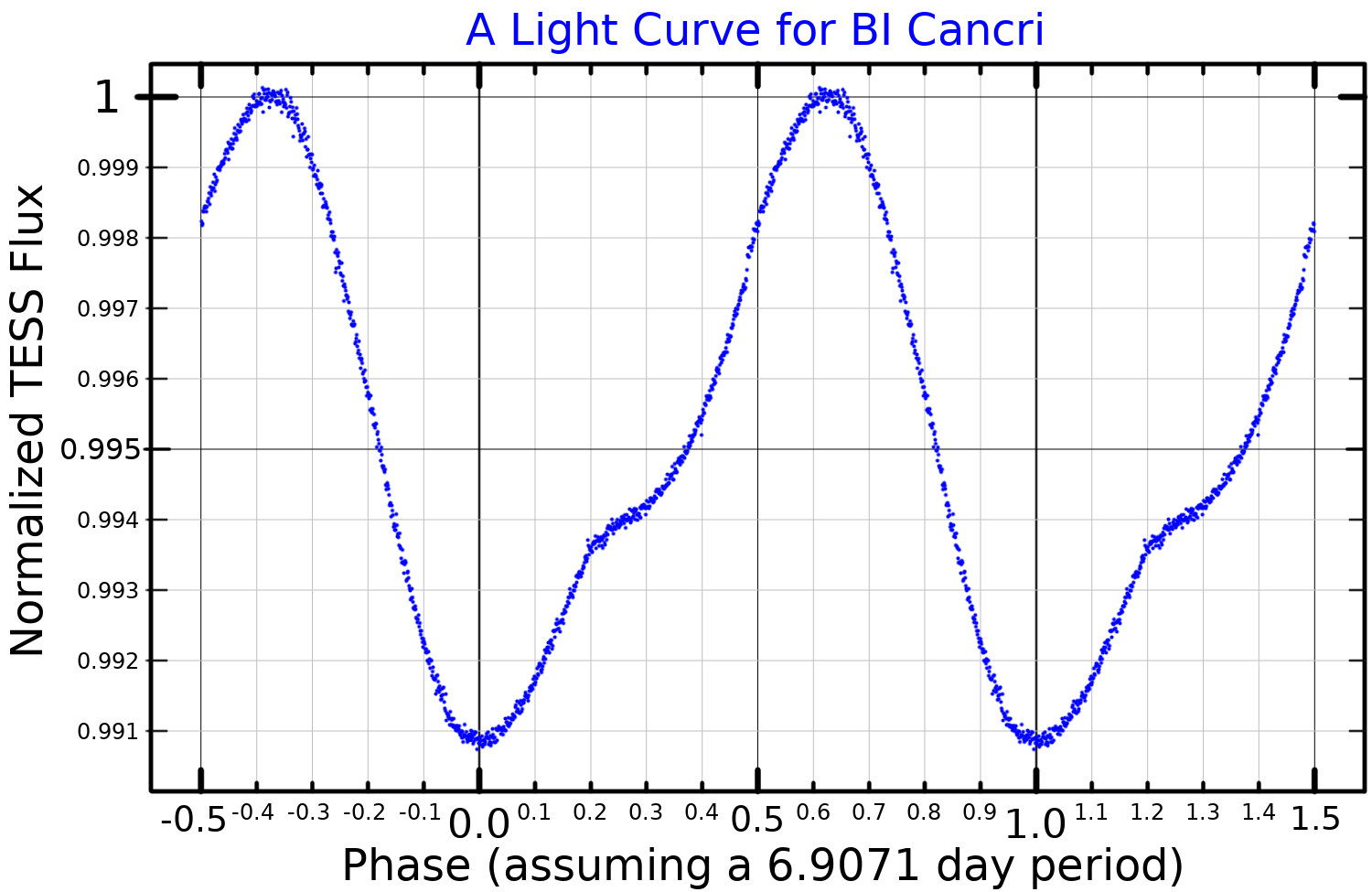
A light curve for BI Cancri, plotted from TESS data

In 1962, Helmut Abt and John C. Golson published a paper that showed that 49 Cancri was probably a variable star. It was given its variable star designation, BI Cancri, in 1962. Its brightness changes from magnitude 5.58 to 5.71 every seven days. It is classified as an α^{2} Canum Venaticorum variable, a class of magnetic chemically peculiar stars. The brightness changes are thought to correspond to the rotation of the star. 49 Cancri is classified from its spectrum as an Ap star, with enhanced lines of silicon, europium, and chromium. Additionally, calcium and magnesium lines are described as weaker than normal.

49 Cancri is classified as an A1 main sequence star. It has three times the mass of the Sun, an effective temperature of 10,615 K, and a radius of 2.9 R_{☉}. It radiates about a hundred times the luminosity of the Sun due to its high temperature and large size.
