= 79 Cancri =

G-type star in the constellation Cancer

Observation data Epoch J2000.0 Equinox ICRS
- Constellation: Cancer
- Right ascension: 09^{h} 10^{m} 20.85830^{s}
- Declination: +21° 59′ 47.0994″
- Apparent magnitude (V): 6.04

Characteristics
- Evolutionary stage: red giant branch
- Spectral type: G5 III
- B−V color index: 0.871

Astrometry
Radial velocity (R_{v})	−3.24±0.13 km/s
Proper motion (μ)	RA: +3,035 mas/yr Dec.: +5.080 mas/yr
Parallax (π)	8.1760±0.0348 mas
Distance	399 ± 2 ly (122.3 ± 0.5 pc)
Absolute magnitude (M_{V})	0.78

Details
Mass	2.30 M_{☉}
Radius	9.41+0.38 −0.57 R_{☉}
Luminosity	57.6±0.6 L_{☉}
Surface gravity (log g)	2.88 cgs
Temperature	5,076±47 K
Metallicity [Fe/H]	−0.10 dex
Age	770 Myr

Other designations
- 79 Cnc, BD+22°2063, GC 12655, HD 78715, HIP 45033, HR 3640, SAO 80674, WDS 09103+2200

Database references
SIMBAD	data

79 Cancri is a star in the constellation Cancer, located 399 light years from the Sun. It is just visible to the naked eye as a dim, yellow-hued star with an apparent visual magnitude of 6.04. This object is gradually moving slower to the Earth with a heliocentric radial velocity of −3.2 km/s.

This is an aging giant star with a stellar classification of G5 III, which indicates that, at the age of 770 million years, it has exhausted the hydrogen at its core and evolved away from the main sequence. The star has 2.30 times the mass of the Sun and has expanded to 9.4 times the Sun's radius. It is radiating 58 times the Sun's luminosity from its enlarged photosphere at an effective temperature of 5,076 K.
