= 78 Cancri =

Star in the constellation Cancer

Observation data Epoch J2000.0 Equinox ICRS
- Constellation: Cancer
- Right ascension: 09^{h} 09^{m} 02.31165^{s}
- Declination: +17° 28′ 10.7518″
- Apparent magnitude (V): 7.19

Characteristics
- Spectral type: K3 III
- B−V color index: 1.207±0.008

Astrometry
Radial velocity (R_{v})	+77.70±0.15 km/s
Proper motion (μ)	RA: −38.419 mas/yr Dec.: −32.292 mas/yr
Parallax (π)	5.9540±0.0572 mas
Distance	548 ± 5 ly (168 ± 2 pc)
Absolute magnitude (M_{V})	0.56

Details
Mass	1.62 M_{☉}
Radius	10.92+0.50 −0.94 R_{☉}
Luminosity	47.6±0.6 L_{☉}
Temperature	4,587+213 −101 K
Age	2.91 Gyr

Other designations
- 78 Cnc, BD+18 2129, HD 78479, HIP 44918, SAO 98389

Database references
SIMBAD	data

78 Cancri is a star in the zodiac constellation of Cancer, located 548 light years from the Sun. It is too faint to be viewed with the naked eye, having an apparent visual magnitude of 7.19. The star is moving away from the Earth with a relatively large radial velocity of +77.7 km/s. It is an evolved giant star with a stellar classification of K3 III.
