= 29 Cancri =

Star in the constellation Cancer

Observation data Epoch J2000.0 Equinox ICRS
- Constellation: Cancer
- Right ascension: 08^{h} 28^{m} 37.33859^{s}
- Declination: +12° 39′ 16.6066″
- Apparent magnitude (V): 5.94

Characteristics
- Evolutionary stage: main sequence
- Spectral type: A5 V
- B−V color index: 0.201±0.010

Astrometry
Radial velocity (R_{v})	+2.0±4.3 km/s
Proper motion (μ)	RA: −13.928 mas/yr Dec.: −12.558 mas/yr
Parallax (π)	8.8043±0.0747 mas
Distance	370 ± 3 ly (113.6 ± 1.0 pc)
Absolute magnitude (M_{V})	0.83

Details
Mass	2.30±0.04 M_{☉}
Radius	3.6 R_{☉}
Luminosity	44.8+3.3 −3.1 L_{☉}
Surface gravity (log g)	3.56 cgs
Temperature	7,727±71 K
Rotational velocity (v sin i)	117 km/s
Age	784 Gyr

Other designations
- 29 Cnc, BD+14°1899, FK5 1222, HD 71555, HIP 41578, HR 3333, SAO 97843

Database references
SIMBAD	data

29 Cancri is a star in the zodiac constellation of Cancer, located 370 light years from the Sun. It is just visible to the naked eye as a dim, white-hued star with an apparent visual magnitude of 5.94. The star is situated near the ecliptic, which means it is subject to lunar occultations.

This is an A-type main-sequence star with a stellar classification of A5 V, which indicates it is generating energy through hydrogen fusion at its core. It has 2.3 times the mass of the Sun and around 3.6 times the Sun's radius. The star has a relatively high rate of rotation, showing a projected rotational velocity of 117 km/s. It is radiating 45 times the Sun's luminosity from its photosphere at an effective temperature of 7,727 K.
