= 39 Cancri =

Star in the constellation Cancer

Observation data Epoch J2000.0 Equinox ICRS
- Constellation: Cancer
- Right ascension: 08^{h} 40^{m} 06.41823^{s}
- Declination: +20° 00′ 28.0339″
- Apparent magnitude (V): 6.39

Characteristics
- Spectral type: G8+ III-IIIb
- B−V color index: 0.98

Astrometry
Radial velocity (R_{v})	33.88 km/s
Proper motion (μ)	RA: −35.610 mas/yr Dec.: −11.964 mas/yr
Parallax (π)	5.3162±0.0589 mas
Distance	614 ± 7 ly (188 ± 2 pc)

Details
Mass	2.88 M_{☉}
Radius	12 R_{☉}
Luminosity	105 L_{☉}
Surface gravity (log g)	2.70±0.11 cgs
Temperature	4,954±25 K
Metallicity [Fe/H]	+0.21±0.05 dex
Age	460 Myr

Other designations
- 39 Cnc, BD+20°2158, HD 73665, HIP 42516, HR 3427, SAO 80333

Database references
SIMBAD	data

39 Cancri is a star in the constellation Cancer, located about 614 light years from the Sun in the Beehive Cluster (NGC 2632). It is a challenge to see with the naked eye, having an apparent visual magnitude of 6.39. This object is moving further from the Earth with a heliocentric radial velocity of 34 km/s.

This is an evolved giant star with a stellar classification of G8+ III-IIIb, indicating it has consumed the hydrogen at its core. It is 460 million years old with 2.88 times the mass of the Sun and about 12 times the Sun's radius. The star is radiating 105 times the Sun's luminosity from its enlarged photosphere at an effective temperature of 4,954 K.
