= 25 Cancri =

Star in the constellation Cancer

Observation data Epoch J2000.0 Equinox ICRS
- Constellation: Cancer
- Right ascension: 08^{h} 25^{m} 49.87726^{s}
- Declination: +17° 02′ 46.5717″
- Apparent magnitude (V): 6.11

Characteristics
- Spectral type: F6 V
- B−V color index: 0.448±0.005

Astrometry
Radial velocity (R_{v})	+37.56±0.13 km/s
Proper motion (μ)	RA: −191.567 mas/yr Dec.: −151.554 mas/yr
Parallax (π)	21.9803±0.0321 mas
Distance	148.4 ± 0.2 ly (45.50 ± 0.07 pc)
Absolute magnitude (M_{V})	2.85

Details

25 Cnc A
Mass	1.51 M_{☉}
Radius	2.0 R_{☉}
Luminosity	6.60 L_{☉}
Surface gravity (log g)	4.01 cgs
Temperature	6,487 K
Metallicity [Fe/H]	−0.10 dex
Rotational velocity (v sin i)	37.74±0.55 km/s
Age	2.50 Gyr

25 Cnc B
Mass	0.34 M_{☉}

Other designations
- d^{2} Cnc, 25 Cnc, BD+17°1842, HD 71030, HIP 41319, HR 3299, SAO 97806, WDS 08258+1703

Database references
SIMBAD	data

25 Cancri is a common proper motion star system in the zodiac constellation of Cancer, located around 148 light-years away from the Sun. It has the Bayer designation d^{2} Cancri (d^{2} Cnc); 25 Cancri (25 Cnc) is the Flamsteed designation. It is near the lower limit of visibility to the naked eye in good viewing conditions, appearing as a dim, yellow-white-hued star with a combined apparent visual magnitude of 6.11. The pair have a relatively high proper motion, traversing the celestial sphere at an angular rate of 0.245″ per year. It is moving further from the Earth with a heliocentric radial velocity of +38 km/s.

Based upon a stellar classification of F6 V, the brighter component is an F-type main-sequence star that is generating energy through hydrogen fusion at its core. Cowley (1976) listed a class of F5 IIIm?, which suggests it may be an Am star. However, this has not been confirmed. It is about 2.5 billion years old with 1.51 times the mass of the Sun. The star is radiating 6.6 times the Sun's luminosity from its photosphere at an effective temperature of 6,487 K.

The companion is 4.19 magnitudes fainter than the primary, and lies at an angular separation of 16.798″ along a position angle of 310°, as of 2013. If the pair are gravitationally bound, then they orbit each other with a period of around 4.05 million years.
