= 37 Cancri =

Star in the constellation Cancer

Observation data Epoch J2000.0 Equinox ICRS
- Constellation: Cancer
- Right ascension: 08^{h} 38^{m} 05.17248^{s}
- Declination: +09° 34′ 28.6006″
- Apparent magnitude (V): 6.542

Characteristics
- Evolutionary stage: main sequence
- Spectral type: A1 V
- B−V color index: −0.010±0.006

Astrometry
Radial velocity (R_{v})	+22.1±2.2 km/s
Proper motion (μ)	RA: −28.271 mas/yr Dec.: −4.237 mas/yr
Parallax (π)	6.5093±0.0735 mas
Distance	501 ± 6 ly (154 ± 2 pc)
Absolute magnitude (M_{V})	1.30

Details
Mass	2.66±0.05 M_{☉}
Radius	1.8 R_{☉}
Luminosity	30.9+3.0 −2.7 L_{☉}
Surface gravity (log g)	4.30 cgs
Temperature	9,830 K
Metallicity [Fe/H]	−0.21±0.13 dex
Rotational velocity (v sin i)	35.2±1.1 km/s

Other designations
- 37 Cnc, BD+10°1840, HD 73316, HIP 42353, HR 3412, SAO 116975

Database references
SIMBAD	data

37 Cancri is a star in the zodiac constellation of Cancer. It is a challenge to view with the naked eye, having an apparent magnitude of 6.54. The star is moving away from the Earth with a heliocentric radial velocity of +22 km/s, having come as close as 246 light-years some 2.7 million years ago.

This is an ordinary A-type main-sequence star with a stellar classification of A1 V, which indicates it is generating energy through hydrogen fusion at its core. It is spinning with a projected rotational velocity of 35 km/s. The star has 2.7 times the mass of the Sun and around 1.8 times the Sun's radius. It is radiating 31 times the luminosity of the Sun from its photosphere at an effective temperature of 9,830 K.
