= 34 Cancri =

Star in the constellation Cancer

Observation data Epoch J2000.0 Equinox ICRS
- Constellation: Cancer
- Right ascension: 08^{h} 32^{m} 39.87069^{s}
- Declination: +10° 03′ 57.6306″
- Apparent magnitude (V): 6.48

Characteristics
- Evolutionary stage: main sequence
- Spectral type: A1 V
- B−V color index: −0.007±0.007

Astrometry
Radial velocity (R_{v})	−11.0±7.4 km/s
Proper motion (μ)	RA: +4.517 mas/yr Dec.: −6.139 mas/yr
Parallax (π)	5.7408±0.0912 mas
Distance	568 ± 9 ly (174 ± 3 pc)
Absolute magnitude (M_{V})	0.40

Details
Mass	2.67±0.09 M_{☉}
Radius	3.2 R_{☉}
Luminosity	69.84 L_{☉}
Surface gravity (log g)	3.83 cgs
Temperature	9,661±111 K
Rotational velocity (v sin i)	18 km/s
Age	336 Myr

Other designations
- 34 Cnc, BD+10°1818, GC 11689, HD 72359, HIP 41904, HR 3372, SAO 97902

Database references
SIMBAD	data

34 Cancri is a star in the zodiac constellation of Cancer, located about 568 light years away from the Sun. It is a challenge to view with the naked even under good viewing conditions, having an apparent visual magnitude of 6.48. At the distance of this star, its visual magnitude is diminished by an extinction of 0.14 due to interstellar dust.

This is an A-type main-sequence star with a stellar classification of A1 V. It is a chemically peculiar star, possibly of the magnetic-type (CP2), showing an abnormal abundance of strontium. The star is an estimated 336 million years old with only a moderate projected rotational velocity of 18 km/s. It has an estimated 2.7 times the mass of the Sun and about 3.2 times the Sun's radius. The star is radiating 70 times the Sun's luminosity from its photosphere at an effective temperature of 9,661 K.
