= 75 Cancri =

Binary star system in the constellation Cancer

Observation data Epoch J2000 Equinox ICRS
- Constellation: Cancer
- Right ascension: 09^{h} 08^{m} 47.33104^{s}
- Declination: +26° 37′ 44.8062″
- Apparent magnitude (V): 5.98

Characteristics
- Spectral type: G5 IV-V
- U−B color index: +0.20
- B−V color index: +0.65

Astrometry
Radial velocity (R_{v})	9.7478(60) km/s
Proper motion (μ)	RA: −138.07 mas/yr Dec.: −369.97 mas/yr
Parallax (π)	32.004±0.052 mas
Distance	101.9 ± 0.2 ly (31.25 ± 0.05 pc)

Orbit
Period (P)	19.412347(23) d
Semi-major axis (a)	5.8696(96) mas
Eccentricity (e)	0.19494(11)
Inclination (i)	19.412347(23)°
Longitude of the node (Ω)	171.892(85)°
Periastron epoch (T)	JD 2453895.9025(24)
Argument of periastron (ω) (secondary)	283.389(39)°
Semi-amplitude (K_{1}) (primary)	26.4961(35) km/s
Semi-amplitude (K_{2}) (secondary)	30.7579(65) km/s

Details

75 Cnc A
Mass	1.173(24) M_{☉}
Temperature	6000 K
Metallicity [Fe/H]	−0.09 dex

75 Cnc B
Mass	1.011(21) M_{☉}
Temperature	5900 K

Other designations
- BD+27°1715, FK5 2724, GJ 9286, HD 78418, HIP 44892, HR 3626, SAO 80659

Database references
SIMBAD	data

75 Cancri (abbreviated to 75 Cnc) is a binary star in the constellation of Cancer. The system is located about 102 light-years (31 parsecs) away, based on its stellar properties.

== Background ==
75 Cancri is a spectroscopic binary, which means the two stellar components are too close to be resolved, but periodic Doppler shifts in their spectra indicate orbital motion. In this case, light from both stars can be detected, and it is a double-lined spectroscopic binary. The orbital period of the system is 19.41 days, and the eccentricity of the system is 0.19494, implying a slightly elliptical orbit. The primary has a mass of 1.173 M_{☉}, and is a G-type main-sequence star or subgiant. The secondary is less massive, at 1.011 M_{☉}.
