= 28 Cancri =

Binary star in the constellation Cancer

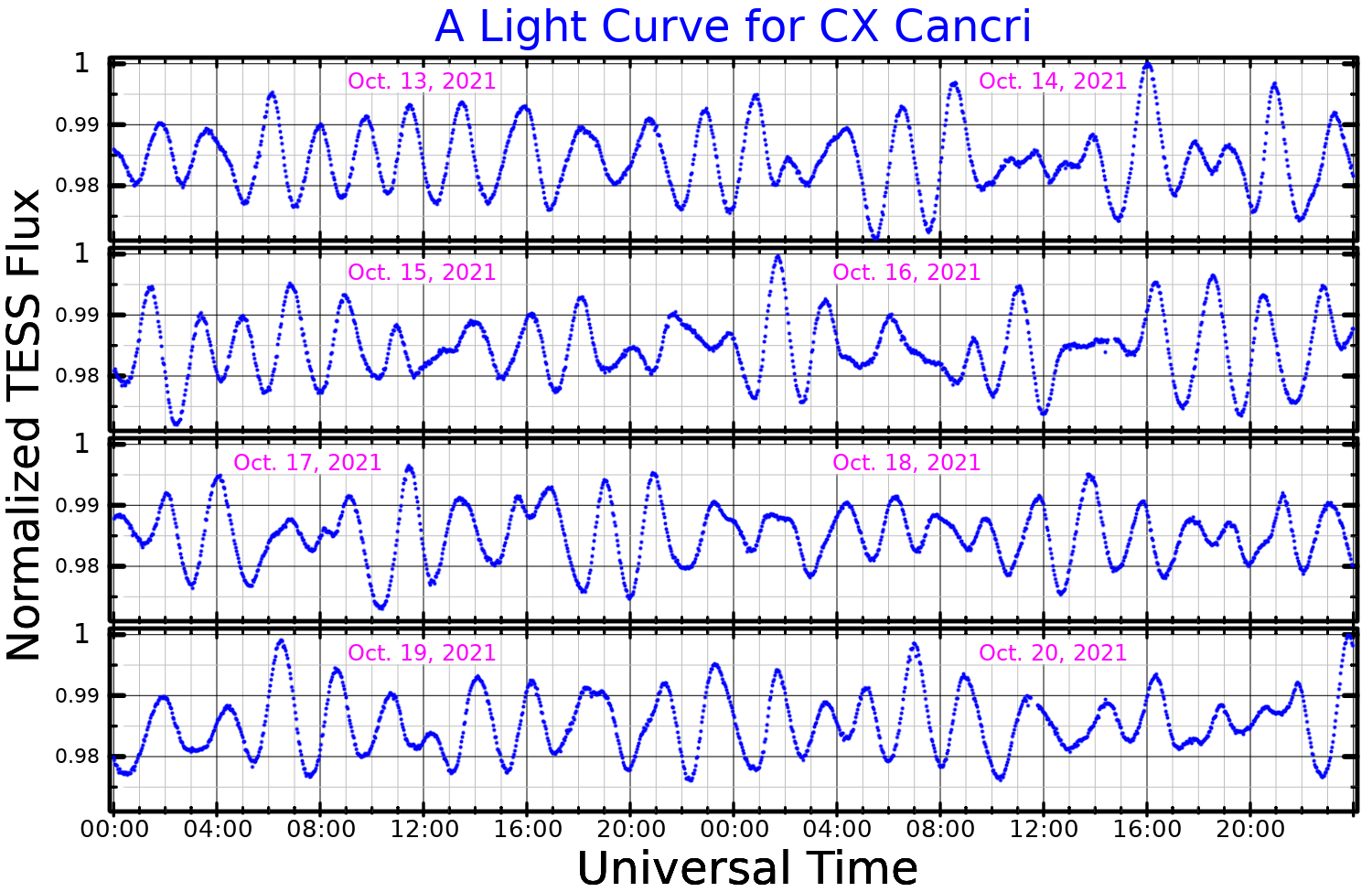
- A light curve for CX Cancri, plotted from TESS data

Observation data Epoch J2000 Equinox ICRS
- Constellation: Cancer
- Right ascension: 08^{h} 28^{m} 36.78530^{s}
- Declination: +24° 08′ 41.7179″
- Apparent magnitude (V): 6.05

Characteristics
- Spectral type: F0 Vn
- U−B color index: +0.13
- B−V color index: +0.22
- Variable type: δ Sct

Astrometry
Radial velocity (R_{v})	+9.0±4.3 km/s
Proper motion (μ)	RA: −30.946 mas/yr Dec.: −39.719 mas/yr
Parallax (π)	8.4885±0.1539 mas
Distance	384 ± 7 ly (118 ± 2 pc)
Absolute magnitude (M_{V})	0.41

Details
Mass	2.36±0.11 M_{☉}
Radius	3.7 R_{☉}
Luminosity	44 L_{☉}
Surface gravity (log g)	3.61 cgs
Temperature	7,516+52 −103 K
Metallicity [Fe/H]	+0.16 dex
Rotational velocity (v sin i)	133 km/s
Age	737 Myr

Other designations
- 28 Cnc, CX Cnc, BD+24°1931, HD 71496, HIP 41574, HR 3329, SAO 80204

Database references
SIMBAD	data

28 Cancri is a star system in the zodiac constellation of Cancer. It is a variable star with the designation CX Cancri, and is close to the lower limit of visibility with the naked eye, having a mean apparent visual magnitude of 6.05. The annual parallax shift seen from Earth's orbit is 8.5 mas, which provides a distance estimate of about 384 light years. It is moving away from the Sun with a radial velocity of around +9 km/s.

Based upon proper motion variation, this is an astrometric binary system with high likelihood (99.8%). The visible component has a stellar classification of F0 Vn, indicating it is a F-type main-sequence star with "nebulous" lines due to rapid rotation.

In 1973, John R Percy announced that 28 Cancri might be a variable star. Stephen John Horan et al. confirmed that the star's brightness varies, in 1974. In 1979, it was given its variable star designation. It is a Delta Scuti variable star with a period of 0.0960 days and an amplitude of 0.020 in magnitude. With 2.4 times the mass of the Sun it is spinning with a high projected rotational velocity of 133 km/s. 28 Cancri is radiating roughly 44 times the Sun's luminosity from its photosphere at an effective temperature of around 7,516 K.
