= 12 Cancri =

Star in the constellation Cancer

Observation data Epoch J2000 Equinox ICRS
- Constellation: Cancer
- Right ascension: 08^{h} 08^{m} 42.4457^{s}
- Declination: +13° 38′ 27.307″
- Apparent magnitude (V): 6.25

Characteristics
- Spectral type: F3 V
- B−V color index: 0.480±0.007

Astrometry
Radial velocity (R_{v})	−10.0±4.3 km/s
Proper motion (μ)	RA: +2.776 mas/yr Dec.: −14,723 mas/yr
Parallax (π)	12.7085±0.1327 mas
Distance	257 ± 3 ly (78.7 ± 0.8 pc)
Absolute magnitude (M_{V})	1.59

Details
Mass	1.16 M_{☉}
Luminosity	17.94 L_{☉}
Surface gravity (log g)	3.60±0.14 cgs
Temperature	6,357±88 K
Metallicity [Fe/H]	0.04 dex
Rotational velocity (v sin i)	52.3±4.1 km/s
Age	2.466 Gyr

Other designations
- 12 Cnc, BD+14°1831, HD 67483, HIP 39874, HR 3184, SAO 97594

Database references
SIMBAD	data

12 Cancri is a star in the zodiac constellation Cancer. It has an apparent visual magnitude of 6.25, placing just below the normal limit for stars visible to the naked eye in good seeing conditions. The star displays an annual parallax shift of 12.7 mas as seen from Earth's orbit, which places it at a distance of about 257 light-years. It is moving toward the Sun with a radial velocity of around −10 km/s.

This is an ordinary F-type main-sequence star with a stellar classification of F3 V, which indicates it is generating energy through hydrogen fusion at its core. It is spinning with a projected rotational velocity of 52 km/s and appears to be undergoing solar-like differential rotation with relative rate of α = 0.33±0.13. The star is about 2.5 billion years old with 1.16 times the mass of the Sun and is radiating nearly 18 times the Sun's luminosity from its photosphere at an effective temperature of around 6,357 K.
