= 21 Cancri =

Red giant star in the constellation Cancer

Observation data Epoch J2000 Equinox ICRS
- Constellation: Cancer
- Right ascension: 08^{h} 23^{m} 55.20829^{s}
- Declination: +10° 37′ 55.4169″
- Apparent magnitude (V): 6.08

Characteristics
- Spectral type: M2III
- B−V color index: 1.507±0.004
- Variable type: suspected

Astrometry
Radial velocity (R_{v})	4.53 km/s
Proper motion (μ)	RA: −0.843 mas/yr Dec.: −22.943 mas/yr
Parallax (π)	4.1258±0.0272 mas
Distance	791 ± 5 ly (242 ± 2 pc)

Details
Radius	53 R_{☉}
Luminosity	587 L_{☉}
Temperature	3,885 K

Other designations
- NSV 17875, BD+11°1830, HD 70734, HIP 41163, HR 3290, SAO 97788

Database references
SIMBAD	data

21 Cancri is a double star in the northern zodiac constellation of Cancer. It is just visible to the naked eye as a dim, red-hued star with an apparent visual magnitude of 6.08. The star is located around 791 light years away from the Sun, based on parallax. It is moving further from the Earth with a heliocentric radial velocity of 35 km/s.

The brighter component is an aging red giant with a stellar classification of M2III. It is currently on the asymptotic giant branch, indicating this is a highly evolved star that has exhausted both its core hydrogen and core helium. This is a suspected variable star. It has expanded to 53 times the radius of the Sun and is radiating 587 times the Sun's luminosity from its swollen photosphere at an effective temperature of 3,885 K. A 9th magnitude companion star is located one arc second away.
