= 36 Cancri =

Star in the constellation Cancer

Observation data Epoch J2000.0 Equinox ICRS
- Constellation: Cancer
- Right ascension: 08^{h} 37^{m} 05.76881^{s}
- Declination: +09° 39′ 20.0865″
- Apparent magnitude (V): 5.92

Characteristics
- Evolutionary stage: main sequence
- Spectral type: A3 V
- B−V color index: 0.083±0.003

Astrometry
Radial velocity (R_{v})	+16.4±2.5 km/s
Proper motion (μ)	RA: −28.271 mas/yr Dec.: −4.237 mas/yr
Parallax (π)	6.5093±0.0735 mas
Distance	501 ± 6 ly (154 ± 2 pc)
Absolute magnitude (M_{V})	0.05

Details
Mass	2.66±0.05 M_{☉}
Radius	2.0 R_{☉}
Luminosity	93.1+13.2 −11.6 L_{☉}
Temperature	8472+98 −97 K
Rotational velocity (v sin i)	44 km/s

Other designations
- c Cnc, 36 Cnc, BD+10°1837, FK5 2675, HD 73143, HIP 42265, HR 3406, SAO 116953

Database references
SIMBAD	data

36 Cancri is a star located in the southern part of the zodiac constellation Cancer, approximately 501 light years away from the Sun. It is also known by its Bayer designation c Cancri and its Flamsteed designation 36 Cancri. This star is visible to the naked eye as a faint, white-hued object with an apparent visual magnitude of 5.92. It is moving away from Earth with a heliocentric radial velocity of +16 km/s.

This is an ordinary A-type main-sequence star with a stellar classification of A3 V, which indicates it is generating energy through hydrogen fusion at its core. It has a projected rotational velocity of 44 km/s, with 2.66 times the mass of the Sun and double the Sun's radius. The star is radiating 93 times the Sun's luminosity from its photosphere at an effective temperature of 8,472 K.
