= 1 Cancri =

K-type giant star in the constellation Cancer

Observation data Epoch J2000 Equinox ICRS
- Constellation: Cancer
- Right ascension: 07^{h} 56^{m} 59.45262^{s}
- Declination: +15° 47′ 25.0019″
- Apparent magnitude (V): 5.97

Characteristics
- Spectral type: K3− III
- B−V color index: 1.285±0.007

Astrometry
Radial velocity (R_{v})	+13.55±0.12 km/s
Proper motion (μ)	RA: −26.731 mas/yr Dec.: −42.7591 mas/yr
Parallax (π)	6.9810±0.0694 mas
Distance	467 ± 5 ly (143 ± 1 pc)
Absolute magnitude (M_{V})	0.03

Details
Mass	1.1 M_{☉}
Radius	18.7 R_{☉}
Luminosity	199 L_{☉}
Surface gravity (log g)	2.03 cgs
Temperature	4,231 K
Metallicity [Fe/H]	−0.01 dex

Other designations
- 1 Cnc, BD+16°1590, FK5 1208, HD 64960, HIP 38848, HR 3095, SAO 97399

Database references
SIMBAD	data

1 Cancri is a single star in the zodiac constellation of Cancer, positioned near the border with Gemini at a distance of around 467 light years from the Sun. It is barely visible to the naked eye as a dim, orange-hued star with an apparent visual magnitude of 5.97. The object is moving further from the Earth with a heliocentric radial velocity of +14 km/s.

This is an evolved giant star with a stellar classification of K3− III, having exhausted the hydrogen at its core and expanded. It is specified as a spectral standard for that type. The angular diameter of the star measured from a lunar occultation is 2.1±0.6 mas, which, at its estimated distance, equates to a physical radius of about 19 times the radius of the Sun. It is radiating 199 times the Sun's luminosity from its enlarged photosphere at an effective temperature of 4,231 K.
