= 67 Cancri =

Wide binary star system in the constellation Cancer

Observation data Epoch J2000.0 Equinox J2000.0
- Constellation: Cancer
- Right ascension: 09^{h} 01^{m} 48.83127^{s}
- Declination: +27° 54′ 09.3652″
- Apparent magnitude (V): 6.07 (6.08 + 9.22)

Characteristics
- Evolutionary stage: main sequence
- Spectral type: A8 Vn
- B−V color index: 0.243±0.008

Astrometry
| Radial velocity (R_{v}) | +12.0±4.3 km/s |
| Proper motion (μ) | RA: −54.797 mas/yr Dec.: −81.038 mas/yr |
| Parallax (π) | 17.6457±0.0758 mas |
| Distance | 184.8 ± 0.8 ly (56.7 ± 0.2 pc) |
| Absolute magnitude (M_{V}) | 2.25 |

Details

67 Cnc A
| Mass | 1.89 M_{☉} |
| Radius | 1.86 R_{☉} |
| Luminosity | 10.4 L_{☉} |
| Surface gravity (log g) | 4.35 cgs |
| Temperature | 7,982±271 K |
| Rotational velocity (v sin i) | 105 km/s |
| Age | 867 Myr |

Other designations
- 67 Cnc, BD+28°1674, HD 77190, HIP 44342, HR 3589, SAO 80585, WDS 09014+3215

Database references
| SIMBAD | data |

67 Cancri is a wide binary star system in the zodiac constellation of Cancer, located 185 light years away from the Sun. It is just visible to the naked eye as a faint, white-hued star with a combined apparent magnitude of 6.07. The binary nature of this system was discovered by James South and John Herschel. As of 2007, the two components have an angular separation of 103.9″, corresponding to a projected separation of 6,100 AU. They are moving further from the Earth with a heliocentric radial velocity of +12 km/s.

The primary, designated component A, is an A-type main-sequence star with a stellar classification of A8 Vn. The 'n' notation indicates "nebulous" lines due to rapid rotation. It is a shell star, with weak shell lines of singly-ionized titanium being detected in the near ultraviolet in 1970. These may have come from a sporadic mass loss event. Uesugi and Fukuda (1970) gave a projected rotational velocity estimate of 105 km/s for the star, although Abt et al. (1997) suggested it could be as high as 205 km/s.

67 Cancri A is about 867 million years old with 1.89 times the mass of the Sun and 1.9 times the Sun's radius. It is radiating 10.4 times the Sun's luminosity from its photosphere at an effective temperature of 7,982 K.
