= Mu2 Cancri =

Star in the constellation Cancer

μ^{2} Cancri
- Location of μ^{2} Cancri (circled)

Observation data Epoch J2000.0 Equinox J2000.0 (ICRS)
- Constellation: Cancer
- Right ascension: 08^{h} 07^{m} 45.856^{s}
- Declination: +21° 34′ 54.53″
- Apparent magnitude (V): +5.30

Characteristics
- Evolutionary stage: Subgiant
- Spectral type: G2 IV
- U−B color index: +0.21
- B−V color index: +0.63

Astrometry
Radial velocity (R_{v})	−36.0±0.1 km/s
Proper motion (μ)	RA: +23.227 mas/yr Dec.: −67.764 mas/yr
Parallax (π)	41.9916±0.0841 mas
Distance	77.7 ± 0.2 ly (23.81 ± 0.05 pc)
Absolute magnitude (M_{V})	+3.46

Details
Mass	1.192+0.017 −0.016 M_{☉}
Radius	1.830±0.037 R_{☉}
Luminosity	3.645±0.017 L_{☉}
Surface gravity (log g)	3.97±0.02 cgs
Temperature	5,809±59 K
Metallicity [Fe/H]	0.11 dex
Rotational velocity (v sin i)	3.7±0.3 km/s
Age	5.64+0.35 −0.14 Gyr

Other designations
- μ^{2} Cnc, 10 Cancri, BD+22°1862, FK5 2630, GC 11021, HD 67228, HIP 39780, HR 3176, SAO 79959

Database references
SIMBAD	data

Mu^{2} Cancri is a solitary, yellow-hued star in the zodiac constellation of Cancer. Its name is a Bayer designation that is Latinized from μ^{2} Cancri, and abbreviated Mu^{2} Cnc or μ^{2} Cnc. This star is visible to the naked eye with an apparent visual magnitude of +5.30. Based upon an annual parallax shift of 42.36 mas as seen from Earth, this star is located 77.7 light-years (23.8 pc) away from the Sun. It is drifting closer with a radial velocity of −36 km/s and will make its closest approach in about 611,100 years when it passes at a distance of 16.8 light-years (5.2 parsecs).

At the estimated age of 5.6 billion years, Mu^{2} Cancri is an evolving G-type subgiant star with a stellar classification of G2 IV. It has 1.2 times the mass of the Sun and 1.8 times the Sun's radius. Mu^{2} Cancri has relatively high metallicity—what astronomers term the abundance of elements other than hydrogen and helium—having a 29% higher abundance compared to the Sun. It is radiating 3.65 times the Sun's luminosity at an effective temperature of 5,809 K. The star is spinning with a leisurely projected rotational velocity of 3.7 km/s.
