= 54 Cancri =

Star in the constellation Cancer

Observation data Epoch J2000 Equinox J2000
- Constellation: Cancer
- Right ascension: 08^{h} 51^{m} 01.4644^{s}
- Declination: +15° 21′ 02.364″
- Apparent magnitude (V): 6.38

Characteristics
- Spectral type: G5 V-IV or G1V
- B−V color index: 0.629±0.020

Astrometry
Radial velocity (R_{v})	+45.098±0.032 km/s
Proper motion (μ)	RA: −112.475 mas/yr Dec.: +75.099 mas/yr
Parallax (π)	24.79±0.33 mas
Distance	132 ± 2 ly (40.3 ± 0.5 pc)
Absolute magnitude (M_{V})	3.39

Details
Mass	1.23±0.05 M_{☉}
Radius	1.81±0.20 R_{☉}
Luminosity	3.72+0.55 −0.48 L_{☉}
Surface gravity (log g)	4.04±0.04 cgs
Temperature	5,862±15 K
Rotational velocity (v sin i)	3.10±0.56 km/s
Age	5.0+0.7 −0.4 Gyr

Other designations
- 54 Cnc, BD+15°1917, FK5 2699, HD 75528, HIP 43454, HR 3510, SAO 98168

Database references
SIMBAD	data

54 Cancri is a star in the zodiac constellation of Cancer. It has an apparent visual magnitude of 6.38, which places it just below the normal brightness limit of stars visible to the naked eye. The annual parallax shift is 24.79 mas as measured from Earth's orbit, which yields a distance estimate of about 132 light years. It is moving away from the Sun with a radial velocity of +45 km/s.

Measurement of the stars proper motion over time suggest changes due to an acceleration component, which may indicate it is a close binary system. The visible component has a stellar classification of G5 V, indicating it is an ordinary G-type main-sequence star that is generating energy through hydrogen fusion in its core region. Hall et al. (2007) classify it as a low-activity variable star. The star is about five billion years old with a projected rotational velocity of 3.1 km/s. It has 1.23 times the mass of the Sun and 1.81 times the Sun's radius.
