= 83 Cancri =

Star in the constellation Cancer

Observation data Epoch J2000 Equinox ICRS
- Constellation: Cancer
- Right ascension: 09^{h} 18^{m} 58.82772^{s}
- Declination: +17° 42′ 19.2744″
- Apparent magnitude (V): 6.61

Characteristics
- Evolutionary stage: main sequence
- Spectral type: F4V + WD
- B−V color index: 0.487±0.030
- Variable type: constant

Astrometry
Radial velocity (R_{v})	−14.8±0.4 km/s
Proper motion (μ)	RA: −135.130 mas/yr Dec.: −105.267 mas/yr
Parallax (π)	24.5641±0.0966 mas
Distance	132.8 ± 0.5 ly (40.7 ± 0.2 pc)
Absolute magnitude (M_{V})	3.57

Orbit
Period (P)	32±2.5 d
Eccentricity (e)	0.6±0.2
Inclination (i)	94±6°
Longitude of the node (Ω)	148±5°
Periastron epoch (T)	1976.0±3.5
Argument of periastron (ω) (secondary)	351±42°

Details

83 Cnc A
Mass	1.13 M_{☉}
Radius	1.53+0.02 −0.05 R_{☉}
Luminosity	3.135±0.015 L_{☉}
Surface gravity (log g)	3.99 cgs
Temperature	6,218+96 −53 K
Metallicity [Fe/H]	−0.26±0.02 dex
Age	3.1 Gyr

83 Cnc B
Mass	1.3 M_{☉}

Other designations
- 83 Cnc, BD+18°2165, FK5 350, HD 80218, HIP 45699, SAO 98488

Database references
SIMBAD	data

83 Cancri is an astrometric binary star system in the northern constellation of Cancer, positioned near the constellation border with Leo. It is a challenge to view with the naked eye, having an apparent visual magnitude of 6.61. Despite having a Flamsteed designation, the system was too faint to be included in the Bright Star Catalogue. It is located at a distance of 133 light years from the Sun, based on parallax, but is drifting closer with a radial velocity of −15 km/s. 83 Cancri has a relatively high proper motion, traversing the celestial sphere at an angular rate of 0.185″ per annum.

The pair have an orbital period of around 32 days and an eccentricity of about 0.6. The visible member of this system, designated component A, is an F-type main-sequence star with a stellar classification of F4V. Its atmosphere is enhanced with s-process elements, particularly strontium and yttrium, which is attributed to mass transfer from the companion while the latter was on the asymptotic giant branch. The primary is 3.1 billion years old with 1.1 times the mass of the Sun and 1.5 times the Sun's radius. It is radiating 3.1 times the luminosity of the Sun from its photosphere at an effective temperature of 6,218 K. The unseen secondary companion is most likely a high mass white dwarf, having around 1.3 times the Sun's mass.
