= Tau Cancri =

Star in the constellation Cancer

τ Cancri
Observation data Epoch J2000.0 Equinox J2000.0 (ICRS)
- Constellation: Cancer
- Right ascension: 09^{h} 08^{m} 00.050^{s}
- Declination: +29° 39′ 15.24″
- Apparent magnitude (V): +5.42

Characteristics
- Evolutionary stage: red clump
- Spectral type: G8 III
- U−B color index: +0.57
- B−V color index: +0.89

Astrometry
Radial velocity (R_{v})	−13.90±0.14 km/s
Proper motion (μ)	RA: −32.199 mas/yr Dec.: +2.640 mas/yr
Parallax (π)	12.0346±0.1007 mas
Distance	271 ± 2 ly (83.1 ± 0.7 pc)
Absolute magnitude (M_{V})	+0.81

Details
Mass	2.42±0.09 M_{☉}
Radius	7.76±0.51 R_{☉}
Luminosity	40 L_{☉}
Surface gravity (log g)	3.21 cgs
Temperature	5,153 K
Metallicity [Fe/H]	−0.06 dex
Rotational velocity (v sin i)	1.95±0.45 km/s
Age	620±60 Myr

Other designations
- τ Cnc, 72 Cancri, BD+30°1817, FK5 2719, HD 78235, HIP 44818, HR 3621, SAO 80650

Database references
SIMBAD	data

Tau Cancri is a solitary, yellow-hued star in the zodiac constellation of Cancer. Its name is a Bayer designation that is Latinized from τ Cancri, and abbreviated Tau Cnc or τ Cnc. With an apparent visual magnitude of +5.42, it is faintly visible to the naked eye. Based upon an annual parallax shift of 12.03 mas as seen from Earth, it is located around 272 light-years (83 pc) from the Earth. The star is drifting closer to the Sun with a line of sight velocity of −14 km/s.

With an age of about 620 million years and a stellar classification of G8 III, this is a red-clump giant star, which indicates that it has evolved onto the horizontal branch and is generating energy through helium fusion at its core. It is a microvariable, showing a luminosity variation of 0.04 in magnitude. Tau Cancri has an estimated 2.4 times the mass of the Sun and 7.8 times the Sun's radius. The star radiates 40 times the solar luminosity from its photosphere at an effective temperature of 5,153 K. It is spinning slowly with a projected rotational velocity of 2 km/s.
