= 53 Cancri =

Red star in the constellation Cancer

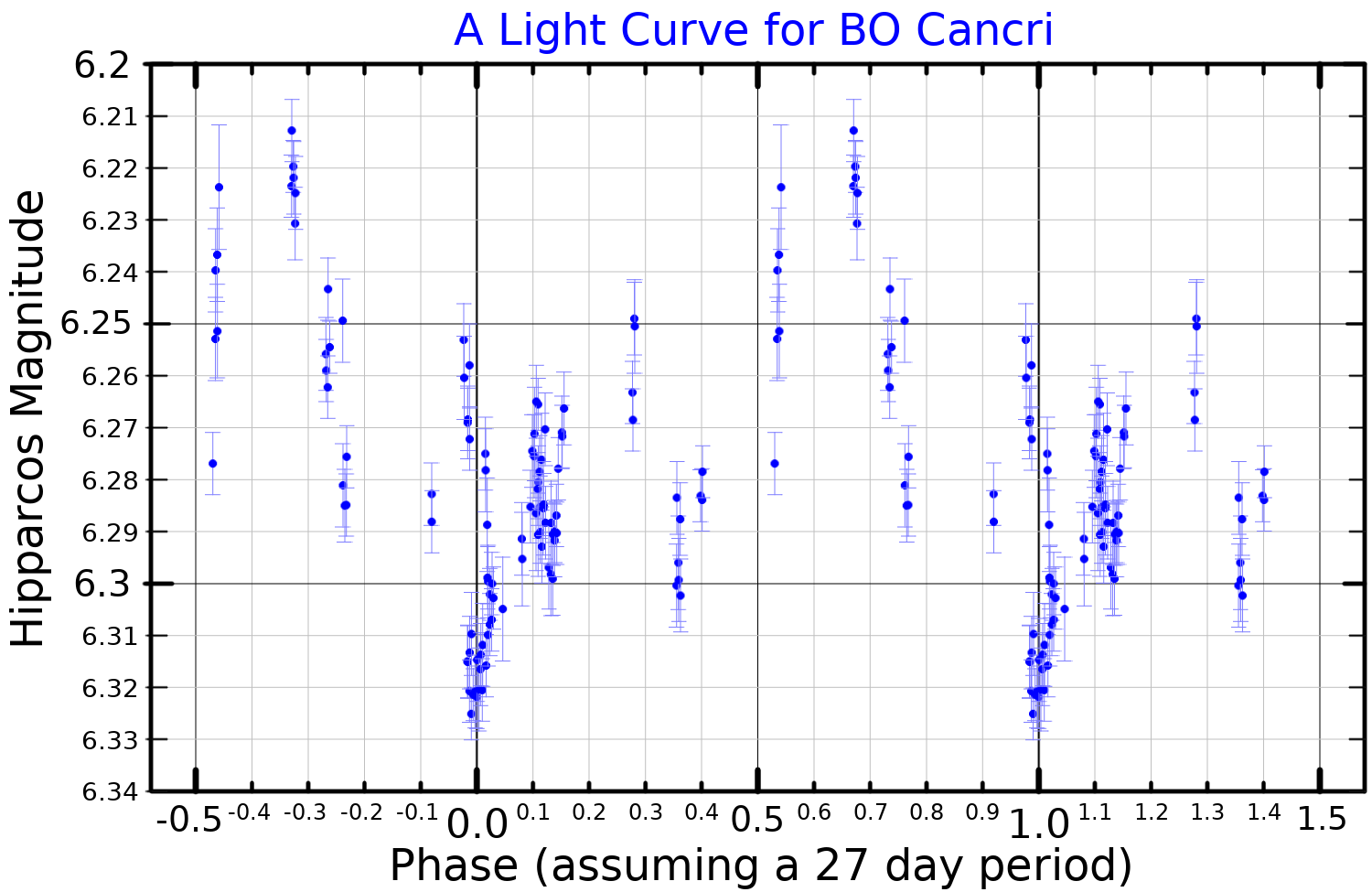
- A light curve for BO Cancri, plotted from Hipparcos data

Observation data Epoch J2000.0 Equinox ICRS
- Constellation: Cancer
- Right ascension: 08^{h} 52^{m} 28.58850^{s}
- Declination: +28° 15′ 32.9851″
- Apparent magnitude (V): 5.9 - 6.4

Characteristics
- Evolutionary stage: AGB
- Spectral type: M3 III
- B−V color index: 1.552±0.010
- Variable type: SRb

Astrometry
Radial velocity (R_{v})	+13.82±0.29 km/s
Proper motion (μ)	RA: −15.212 mas/yr Dec.: −7.961 mas/yr
Parallax (π)	3.4133±0.1685 mas
Distance	960 ± 50 ly (290 ± 10 pc)

Details
Radius	87 R_{☉}
Luminosity	1,175 L_{☉}
Temperature	3,622 K

Other designations
- 53 Cnc, BO Cancri, BD+28°1659, HD 75716, HIP 43575, HR 3521, SAO 80476

Database references
SIMBAD	data

53 Cancri is a variable star in the zodiac constellation Cancer, located around 960 light years from the Sun. It has the variable star designation BO Cancri; 53 Cancri is the Flamsteed designation. This object is a challenge to view with the naked eye, having an apparent visual magnitude around 6. It is around 960 light years away.

The star is moving further away from the Earth with a heliocentric radial velocity of +14 km/s. 53 Cancri is an aging red giant on the asymptotic giant branch and has a stellar classification of M3 III. It has expanded to 87 times the radius of the Sun, and its bolometric luminosity is over a thousand times higher than the Sun's at an effective temperature of 3,622 K.

In 1969, Olin Jeuck Eggen announced that small vaiarions in the brightness of 53 Cancri had been detected. For that reason it was given a variable star designation in 1972. 53 Cancri is a semiregular variable that varies between magnitude 5.9 and 6.4 with a period of 27 days. There is a suspected second period of 270 days.
