= 35 Cancri =

Star in the constellation Cancer

Observation data Epoch J2000.0 Equinox ICRS
- Constellation: Cancer
- Right ascension: 08^{h} 35^{m} 19.44613^{s}
- Declination: +19° 35′ 24.2306″
- Apparent magnitude (V): +6.55

Characteristics
- Evolutionary stage: subgiant
- Spectral type: G0 III
- B−V color index: +0.681±0.013

Astrometry
Radial velocity (R_{v})	+34.9±1.2 km/s
Proper motion (μ)	RA: −34.554 mas/yr Dec.: −12.391 mas/yr
Parallax (π)	5.3538±0.0258 mas
Distance	609 ± 3 ly (186.8 ± 0.9 pc)
Absolute magnitude (M_{V})	0.22

Details
Mass	2.51 M_{☉}
Radius	9.0 R_{☉}
Luminosity	71 L_{☉}
Surface gravity (log g)	2.93 cgs
Temperature	5,581 K
Metallicity [Fe/H]	+0.28 dex
Rotation	10.96 days
Rotational velocity (v sin i)	99.0 km/s
Age	346 Myr

Other designations
- 35 Cnc, BD+20°2118, GC 11904, HD 72779, HIP 42133, HR 3387, SAO 97928

Database references
SIMBAD	data

35 Cancri is a star in the zodiac constellation of Cancer, located about 609 light-years from the Sun. It is a challenge to view with the naked eye even under ideal seeing conditions, having an apparent visual magnitude of +6.55. The star is moving further from the Earth with a heliocentric radial velocity of +35 km/s, and is a member of the Beehive Cluster (Praesepe; Messier 44; NGC 2632).

35 Cancri is a subgiant star, although it has a stellar classification of G0 III, due to its unusually high rotational velocity (99 km/s) for a star of its radius (9 solar radii), giving it an oblate shape with an equatorial bulge that is 5% larger than the polar radius and a spectrum more typical of giant stars (hence "G0 III"). This rotation will decrease significantly as the star continues expanding. It is radiating 71 times the Sun's luminosity from its photosphere at an effective temperature of 5,581 K.
