= 66 Cancri =

Binary star system in the constellation of Cancer

Observation data Epoch J2000.0 Equinox J2000.0
- Constellation: Cancer
- Right ascension: 09^{h} 01^{m} 24.13000^{s}
- Declination: +32° 15′ 08.2666″
- Apparent magnitude (V): 5.870 (5.95 + 8.56)

Characteristics
- Evolutionary stage: main sequence
- Spectral type: A2 V
- B−V color index: 0.088±0.007

Astrometry
Radial velocity (R_{v})	−12.8±2.9 km/s
Proper motion (μ)	RA: +0.48 mas/yr Dec.: +0.34 mas/yr
Parallax (π)	6.8850±0.1020 mas
Distance	474 ± 7 ly (145 ± 2 pc)
Absolute magnitude (M_{V})	0.14

Details
Mass	2.73±0.11 M_{☉}
Luminosity	95.7+24.6 −19.5 L_{☉}
Surface gravity (log g)	4.0 cgs
Temperature	8,974+230 −224 K
Rotational velocity (v sin i)	183 km/s
Age	162 Myr

Other designations
- 66 Cnc, BD+32°1829, HD 77104, HIP 44307, HR 3587, SAO 61202, WDS 09014+3215

Database references
SIMBAD	data

66 Cancri is a binary star system near the northern border of the zodiac constellation of Cancer, located 474 light years away from the Sun. It is visible to the naked eye as a faint, white-hued star with a combined apparent visual magnitude of 5.87. The pair are moving closer to the Earth with a heliocentric radial velocity of −13 light years. As of 2003, the magnitude 8.56 companion was located at an angular separation of 4.43″ along a position angle of 134° from the primary.

The brighter member of the system, designated component A, is an A-type main-sequence star with a stellar classification of A2 V. It is around 162 million years old with a high rate of spin, showing a projected rotational velocity of 183 km/s. Estimates of the mass of the star range from 1.7 up to 2.73 times the mass of the Sun. It is radiating 96 times the Sun's luminosity from its photosphere at an effective temperature of 8,974 K.
