= 57 Cancri =

Star in the constellation Cancer

Observation data Epoch J2000.0 Equinox ICRS
- Constellation: Cancer
- Right ascension: 08^{h} 54^{m} 14.73274^{s}
- Declination: +30° 34′ 44.8283″
- Apparent magnitude (V): +5.40 (6.09 + 6.37)

Characteristics
- Spectral type: G7 III + K0 III
- B−V color index: 1.05

Astrometry
Radial velocity (R_{v})	−57.68±0.28 km/s
Proper motion (μ)	RA: +41.60 mas/yr Dec.: −24.02 mas/yr
Parallax (π)	7.07±0.68 mas
Distance	460 ± 40 ly (140 ± 10 pc)
Absolute magnitude (M_{V})	–0.33

Details

57 Cnc A
Mass	2.80±0.04 M_{☉}
Luminosity	173.13 L_{☉}
Surface gravity (log g)	2.76+0.03 −0.04 cgs
Temperature	5,269+272 −46 K
Metallicity [Fe/H]	0.08±0.05 dex

Other designations
- 57 Cnc, BD+31°1907, GC 12289, HD 75959, HIP 43721, HR 3532, SAO 61125, ADS 7071, WDS J08542+3035

Database references
SIMBAD	data

57 Cancri is a double star in the zodiac constellation of Cancer, located around 460 light years away from the Sun. They are visible to the naked eye as a faint star with a combined apparent visual magnitude of +5.40. The brighter member, designated component A. is a yellow-hued giant star with a stellar classification of G7 III and an apparent magnitude of +6.09. Its companion, component B, is an orange-hued giant with a class of K0 III and an apparent magnitude of +6.37. As of 2017, the pair had an angular separation of 1.50″ along a position angle of 310°. This angular separation translates to a projected separation of 180 astronomical units.
