= Sigma2 Cancri =

White-hued subgiant star in the constellation Cancer

Sigma^{2} Cancri
Observation data Epoch J2000.0 Equinox J2000.0 (ICRS)
- Constellation: Cancer
- Right ascension: 08^{h} 56^{m} 56.598^{s}
- Declination: +32° 54′ 37.54″
- Apparent magnitude (V): +5.436

Characteristics
- Evolutionary stage: main sequence
- Spectral type: A7 IV
- B−V color index: +0.157

Astrometry
Radial velocity (R_{v})	−26.2±0.7 km/s
Proper motion (μ)	RA: −53.031 mas/yr Dec.: −66.186 mas/yr
Parallax (π)	17.0377±0.0716 mas
Distance	191.4 ± 0.8 ly (58.7 ± 0.2 pc)
Absolute magnitude (M_{V})	+1.57

Details
Mass	1.79 M_{☉}
Radius	2.28^{+0.02}_{−0.04} R_{☉}
Luminosity	21.5 L_{☉}
Surface gravity (log g)	4.17 cgs
Temperature	8,309±283 K
Rotational velocity (v sin i)	133 km/s
Age	441 Myr

Other designations
- σ^{2} Cnc, 59 Cancri, BD+33°1785, HD 76398, HIP 43932, HR 3555, SAO 61146

Database references
SIMBAD	data

Sigma^{2} Cancri is a solitary, white-hued star in the constellation Cancer. Its name is a Bayer designation that is Latinized from σ^{2} Cancri, and abbreviated Sigma^{2} Cnc σ^{2} Cnc. This star is faintly visible to the naked eye, having an apparent visual magnitude of +5.44. Based upon an annual parallax shift of 17.04 mas as seen from Earth, this star is located 191 light-years (59 pc) from the Sun. It is drifting closer to the Sun with a radial velocity of −26 km/s.

With an estimated age of 441 million years, this is an A-type subgiant star with a stellar classification of A7 IV. It is spinning rapidly with a projected rotational velocity of 133 km/s. The star has an estimated 1.8 times the mass of the Sun with 2.3 times the Sun's radius. It is radiating 21.5 times the Sun's luminosity from its photosphere at an effective temperature of roughly 8,309 K.
