= Omega2 Cancri =

White-hued star in the constellation Cancer

ω^{2} Cancri
Observation data Epoch J2000.0 Equinox ICRS
- Constellation: Cancer
- Right ascension: 08^{h} 01^{m} 43.757^{s}
- Declination: +25° 05′ 22.08″
- Apparent magnitude (V): 6.32

Characteristics
- Evolutionary stage: main sequence
- Spectral type: A1 V
- B−V color index: 0.023±0.006

Astrometry
Radial velocity (R_{v})	−7.6±2.5 km/s
Proper motion (μ)	RA: −25.138 mas/yr Dec.: +12.276 mas/yr
Parallax (π)	7.5434±0.0393 mas
Distance	432 ± 2 ly (132.6 ± 0.7 pc)
Absolute magnitude (M_{V})	0.51

Details
Mass	2.59±0.06 M_{☉}
Radius	2.55±0.02 R_{☉}
Luminosity	68.0+8.3 −7.3 L_{☉}
Surface gravity (log g)	3.886±0.006 cgs
Temperature	9,354+174 −171 K
Rotational velocity (v sin i)	159 km/s
Age	506±75 Myr

Other designations
- ω^{2} Cancri, 4 Cnc, BD+25°1816, HD 65856, HIP 39263, HR 3132, SAO 79869, CCDM J08017+2506A, WDS J08017+2505A, GSC 01930-00674

Database references
SIMBAD	data

ω^{2} Cancri is a star in the zodiac constellation Cancer. It has the Flamsteed designation 4 Cancri; ω^{2} Cancri is the Bayer designation, which is Latinised to omega^{2} Cancri and abbreviated to ω^{2} Cnc or omega^{2} Cnc. The star is near the lower limit of visibility to the naked eye, having an apparent visual magnitude of 6.32. Based on parallax measurements, it is located around 432 light-years (133 pc) away from the Sun. It is moving closer to the Earth with a heliocentric radial velocity of −8 km/s. The position of this star near the ecliptic means it is subject to lunar occultations.

This is an ordinary A-type main-sequence star with a stellar classification of A1 V, which indicates it is generating energy through hydrogen fusion at its core. At an estimated age of approximately 500 million years, it is spinning rapidly with a projected rotational velocity of 159 km/s. It has 2.6 times the mass of the Sun and about 2.55 times the Sun's radius. The star is radiating 68 times the Sun's luminosity from its photosphere at an effective temperature of 9,354 K.
