= 46 Cancri =

Star in the constellation Cancer

Observation data Epoch J2000.0 Equinox ICRS
- Constellation: Cancer
- Right ascension: 08^{h} 45^{m} 21.42393^{s}
- Declination: +30° 41′ 51.9004″
- Apparent magnitude (V): 6.122

Characteristics
- Evolutionary stage: red giant branch
- Spectral type: G5 III
- B−V color index: 0.912

Astrometry
Radial velocity (R_{v})	–13.1 km/s
Proper motion (μ)	RA: −1.273 mas/yr Dec.: −4.845 mas/yr
Parallax (π)	5.3592±0.0254 mas
Distance	609 ± 3 ly (186.6 ± 0.9 pc)
Absolute magnitude (M_{V})	0.297

Details
Mass	2.65 M_{☉}
Radius	14.8 R_{☉}
Luminosity	125.9 L_{☉}
Surface gravity (log g)	2.82 cgs
Temperature	5,119 K
Metallicity [Fe/H]	−0.02 dex
Rotational velocity (v sin i)	6.6 km/s
Age	740 Myr

Other designations
- 46 Cnc, BD+31°1876, FK5 2690, HD 74485, HIP 42954, HR 3464, SAO 61029

Database references
SIMBAD	data

46 Cancri is a star in the zodiac constellation of Cancer, located around 609 light years away from the Sun. It is a dim, yellow-hued star, near the lower limits of visibility to the naked eye with an apparent visual magnitude of 6.12. The star is moving closer to the Earth with a heliocentric radial velocity of –13.1 km/s. It has a stellar classification of G5 III, matching an aging giant star that has consumed the hydrogen at its core and evolved away from the main sequence.

46 Cancri is 740 million years old with 2.65 times the mass of the Sun. It has expanded to about 11 times the Sun's radius and is radiating 125.9 times the Sun's luminosity from its enlarged photosphere at an effective temperature of 4,966 K.
