= 61 Cancri =

Star in the constellation Cancer

Observation data Epoch J2000.0 Equinox ICRS
- Constellation: Cancer
- Right ascension: 08^{h} 57^{m} 58.66668^{s}
- Declination: +30° 14′ 01.7715″
- Apparent magnitude (V): +6.290 (7.0 + 7.0)

Characteristics
- Spectral type: F4V
- U−B color index: −0.04
- B−V color index: +0.42

Astrometry
| Radial velocity (R_{v}) | +10.1±0.3 km/s |
| Proper motion (μ) | RA: +48.10 mas/yr Dec.: +27.48 mas/yr |
| Parallax (π) | 18.01±0.52 mas |
| Distance | 181 ± 5 ly (56 ± 2 pc) |

Details

61 Cnc A
| Mass | 1.40 M_{☉} |
| Surface gravity (log g) | 3.87 cgs |
| Temperature | 6,396 K |
| Metallicity [Fe/H] | −0.34 dex |
| Rotational velocity (v sin i) | 5 km/s |
| Age | 2.5 Gyr |

61 Cnc B
| Mass | 1.40 M_{☉} |

Other designations
- 61 Cancri, BD+30°1795, HD 76572, HIP 44031, HR 3563, SAO 61157.

Database references
| SIMBAD | data |

61 Cancri (61 Cnc) is the Flamsteed designation for a visual binary star system in the northern constellation Cancer. The pair have a combined apparent magnitude of 6.25, which means 61 Cancri is faintly visible to the naked eye. (According to the Bortle scale, it can be seen from rural or even dark suburban skies.) Based upon parallax measurements, the system is approximately 181 light years away from Earth.

The two components appear to be roughly identical with individual masses of about 1.4 times that of the Sun and apparent magnitudes of 7.0. Their combined stellar classification is F4V, matching that of an F-type main sequence star. They have an angular separation of 0.300″ along a position angle of 129.0° (as of 2014). The pair orbit each other with an estimated period of 40.657 years. No significant level of chromospheric activity has been detected coming from either star.
