= Sigma3 Cancri =

Star in the constellation Cancer

Sigma^{3} Cancri
Observation data Epoch J2000.0 Equinox J2000.0 (ICRS)
- Constellation: Cancer
- Right ascension: 08^{h} 59^{m} 32.655^{s}
- Declination: +32° 25′ 06.81″
- Apparent magnitude (V): +5.24

Characteristics
- Evolutionary stage: red clump
- Spectral type: G9 III
- U−B color index: +0.64
- B−V color index: +0.91

Astrometry
Radial velocity (R_{v})	+20.82±0.21 km/s
Proper motion (μ)	RA: −43.741 mas/yr Dec.: −34.754 mas/yr
Parallax (π)	10.7481±0.0965 mas
Distance	303 ± 3 ly (93.0 ± 0.8 pc)
Absolute magnitude (M_{V})	0.45

Details
Mass	2.81±0.11 M_{☉}
Radius	10.32 R_{☉}
Luminosity	72 L_{☉}
Surface gravity (log g)	3.18 cgs
Temperature	5,170±21 K
Metallicity [Fe/H]	−0.03±0.06 dex
Rotational velocity (v sin i)	2.30±0.47 km/s
Age	420±40 Myr

Other designations
- σ^{3} Cnc, 64 Cancri, BD+32°1821, FK5 1232, GC 12417, HD 76813, HIP 44154, HR 3575, SAO 61177, WDS J08595+3225A

Database references
SIMBAD	data

Sigma^{3} Cancri is a solitary, yellow-hued star in the zodiac constellation of Cancer. Its name is a Bayer designation that is Latinized from σ^{3} Cancri, and abbreviated Sigma^{3} Cnc or σ^{3} Cnc. With an apparent visual magnitude of +5.24, it is a dim star that is visible to the naked eye. Based upon an annual parallax shift of 10.75 mas as seen from Earth, it is located approximately 303 light-years (93 pc) from the Sun. The star's proper motion makes it a candidate for membership in the IC 2391 supercluster.

This is an evolved, G-type giant star with a stellar classification of G9 III. At the estimated age of 420 million years it is a red clump star on the horizontal branch, which indicates it is generating energy through helium fusion at its core. Sigma^{3} Cancri has 2.8 times the mass of the Sun and has expanded to 10.3 times the Sun's radius. It is radiating 72 times the solar luminosity from its photosphere at an effective temperature of 5,170 K.
