= Sigma1 Cancri =

A-type main sequence star in the constellation Cancer

Sigma^{1} Cancri
Observation data Epoch J2000.0 Equinox J2000.0 (ICRS)
- Constellation: Cancer
- Right ascension: 08^{h} 52^{m} 34.622^{s}
- Declination: +32° 28′ 26.97″
- Apparent magnitude (V): 5.68 + 13.3

Characteristics
- Evolutionary stage: main sequence
- Spectral type: A8 Vas
- U−B color index: +0.08
- B−V color index: +0.20
- Variable type: Constant

Astrometry
Radial velocity (R_{v})	−11.26±0.25 km/s
Proper motion (μ)	RA: −5.598 mas/yr Dec.: +15.832 mas/yr
Parallax (π)	14.7289±0.0959 mas
Distance	221 ± 1 ly (67.9 ± 0.4 pc)
Absolute magnitude (M_{V})	+1.62

Details

σ^{1} Cnc A
Mass	1.84 M_{☉}
Radius	2.32 R_{☉}
Luminosity	17.7 L_{☉}
Surface gravity (log g)	3.97 cgs
Temperature	7,780 K
Rotational velocity (v sin i)	84 km/s
Age	301 Myr

σ^{1} Cnc B
Mass	0.62 M_{☉}

Other designations
- σ^{1} Cnc, 51 Cancri, BD+33°1770, HD 75698, HIP 43584, HR 3519, SAO 61102, WDS J08526+3228A

Database references
SIMBAD	data

Sigma^{1} Cancri is a binary star system in the zodiac constellation of Cancer. Its name is a Bayer designation that is Latinized from σ^{1} Cancri, and abbreviated Sigma^{1} Cnc or σ^{1} Cnc. The primary component is faintly visible to the naked eye, with an apparent visual magnitude of +5.68. Based upon an annual parallax shift of 15.51 mas as seen from Earth, this star is located around 221 light-years (68 pc) from the Sun. It is moving further away with a line of sight velocity of −11 km/s.

This is a chemically peculiar A-type main sequence star with a stellar classification of A8 Vas. At an age of about 301 million years, Sigma^{1} Cancri is around 67% of the way through its main sequence lifespan. The star has 1.8 times the mass of the Sun and is radiating 18 times the Sun's luminosity from its photosphere at an effective temperature of 7,780 K.

There is a magnitude 13.3 companion at an angular separation of 5.2 arc seconds along a position angle of 276°, as of 2011. At that distance, the pair have a projected separation of 333.2 AU (0.005269 ly). This star, designated Sigma^{1} Cancri B, has an estimated 62% of the mass of the Sun.
