= List of stars in Aries =

This is the list of notable stars in the constellation Aries, sorted by decreasing brightness.

Name	B	F	Var	HD	HIP	RA	Dec	vis. mag.	abs. mag.	Dist. (ly)	Sp. class	Notes
Hamal	α	13		12929	9884	02^{h} 07^{m} 10.29^{s}	+23° 27′ 46.0″	2.01	0.48	66	K2III	Hamal, Hemal, Hamul, Ras Hammel, El Nath; suspected variable, V_{max} = 1.98^{m}, V_{min} = 2.04^{m}; has a planet (b)
β Ari	β	6		11636	8903	01^{h} 54^{m} 38.35^{s}	+20° 48′ 29.9″	2.64	1.33	60	A5V...	Sheratan, Sharatan, Al Sharatain; suspected variable, V_{max} = 2.56^{m}, V_{min} = 2.70^{m}
41 Ari	(c) (Note: In Bode’s catalogue (http://www.ianridpath.com/startales/muscaborealis.html))	41		17573	13209	02^{h} 49^{m} 58.99^{s}	+27° 15′ 38.8″	3.61	0.16	159	B8Vn	Bharani; c Muscae Borealis; suspected variable, V_{max} = 3.60^{m}, V_{min} = 3.64^{m}
δ Ari	δ	57		19787	14838	03^{h} 11^{m} 37.67^{s}	+19° 43′ 36.1″	4.35	0.79	168	K2IIIvar	Botein, Nir al Botain, Lucida Ventris, part of Al Buṭain; suspected variable, V_{max} = 4.33^{m}, V_{min} = 4.37^{m}
HD 20644	(e)			20644	15549	03^{h} 20^{m} 20.37^{s}	+29° 02′ 54.6″	4.47	−2.00	640	K2II-III	e Muscae Borealis
39 Ari	(b)	39		17361	13061	02^{h} 47^{m} 54.44^{s}	+29° 14′ 50.7″	4.52	0.80	181	K1III	Lilii Borea, b Muscae Borealis
γ^{2} Ari	γ^{2}	5		11503		01^{h} 53^{m} 31.80^{s}	+19° 17′ 45.0″	4.62	1.11	164.0	kA0hA3(IV)SiSr	Mesarthim, Mesartim; binary star; α^{2} CVn variable, ΔV = 0.04^{m}, P = 1.6092 d
35 Ari	(a)	35		16908	12719	02^{h} 43^{m} 27.11^{s}	+27° 42′ 25.8″	4.65	−0.62	370	B3V	Weixiu a Muscae Borealis
γ^{1} Ari	γ^{1}	5		11502	8832	01^{h} 53^{m} 31.77^{s}	+19° 17′ 38.7″	4.70	1.19	164.0	B9.5IV	component of the γ Ari system
λ Ari	λ	9		11973	9153	01^{h} 57^{m} 55.78^{s}	+23° 35′ 45.9″	4.79	1.73	133	F0V	binary star
ζ Ari	ζ	58		20150	15110	03^{h} 14^{m} 54.11^{s}	+21° 02′ 40.7″	4.87	−0.22	340	A1V	part of Al Buṭain
14 Ari	φ	14		13174	10053	02^{h} 09^{m} 25.29^{s}	+25° 56′ 23.9″	4.98	0.02	320	F2III	
κ Ari	κ	12		12869	9836	02^{h} 06^{m} 33.91^{s}	+22° 38′ 54.3″	5.03	1.23	187	A2m	spectroscopic binary
ι Ari	ι	8		11909	9110	01^{h} 57^{m} 21.03^{s}	+17° 49′ 03.3″	5.09	−1.44	659	K1p...	spectroscopic binary
τ^{2} Ari	τ^{2}	63		20893	15737	03^{h} 22^{m} 45.27^{s}	+20° 44′ 31.6″	5.10	0.15	319	K3III	
38 Ari		38	UV	17093	12832	02^{h} 44^{m} 57.51^{s}	+12° 26′ 45.5″	5.18	2.26	125	A7III-IV	δ Sct variable, V_{max} = 5.18^{m}, V_{min} = 5.22^{m}, P = 0.0355 d
ε Ari A	ε	48		18519		02^{h} 59^{m} 12.70^{s}	+21° 20′ 25.0″	5.2	0.16	332	A2Vs	part of Al Buṭain; binary star
η Ari	η	17		13555	10306	02^{h} 12^{m} 47.98^{s}	+21° 12′ 39.5″	5.23	2.84	98	F5V	Zuogeng
π Ari	π	42		17543	13165	02^{h} 49^{m} 17.56^{s}	+17° 27′ 51.6″	5.26	−1.07	603	B6V	part of Al Buṭain; spectroscopic binary
τ^{1} Ari	τ^{1}	61		20756	15627	03^{h} 21^{m} 13.61^{s}	+21° 08′ 49.7″	5.27	−0.49	462	B5IV	triple star system; Beta Lyrae variable
33 Ari	(d)	33		16628	12489	02^{h} 40^{m} 41.03^{s}	+27° 03′ 39.6″	5.30	1.03	233	A3V	d Muscae Borealis
ν Ari	ν	32		16432	12332	02^{h} 38^{m} 49.00^{s}	+21° 57′ 41.2″	5.45	0.32	346	A7V	
52 Ari A	(h)	52		19134	14376	03^{h} 05^{m} 26.69^{s}	+25° 15′ 18.7″	5.45	0.00	402	B7Vn	binary star, h Muscae Borealis
ξ Ari	ξ	24		14951	11249	02^{h} 24^{m} 49.04^{s}	+10° 36′ 38.2″	5.48	−0.85	603	B7IV	variable star, ΔV = 0.007^{m}, P = 1.73515 d
ε Ari B	ε	48		18519	13914	02^{h} 59^{m} 12.73^{s}	+21° 20′ 25.6″	5.5	0.46	332	A2Vs	component of the ε Ari system
64 Ari	(g)	64		21017	15861	03^{h} 24^{m} 18.46^{s}	+24° 43′ 27.1″	5.50	1.26	230	K4III	g Muscae Borealis
σ Ari	σ	43		17769	13327	02^{h} 51^{m} 29.57^{s}	+15° 04′ 55.7″	5.52	−0.32	479	B7V	
62 Ari		62		20825	15696	03^{h} 22^{m} 11.89^{s}	+27° 36′ 27.3″	5.55	−1.82	973	G5III	
21 Ari	B	21		13872	10535	02^{h} 15^{m} 42.83^{s}	+25° 02′ 35.7″	5.57	2.16	157	F6V	
θ Ari	θ	22		14191	10732	02^{h} 18^{m} 07.55^{s}	+19° 54′ 04.2″	5.58	0.21	387	A1Vn	
ρ^{3} Ari	ρ^{3}	46		18256	13702	02^{h} 56^{m} 25.98^{s}	+18° 01′ 25.1″	5.58	2.83	115	F6V	part of Al Buṭain; suspected BY Dra variable
HD 20149				20149	15154	03^{h} 15^{m} 20.45^{s}	+30° 33′ 24.0″	5.61	−0.01	434	A1Vs	
10 Ari		10		12558	9621	02^{h} 03^{m} 39.26^{s}	+25° 56′ 07.6″	5.64	2.02	172	F8IV	
31 Ari	υ	31		16234	12153	02^{h} 36^{m} 37.75^{s}	+12° 26′ 52.2″	5.64	2.91	115	F7V	
HD 19270				19270	14439	03^{h} 06^{m} 23.69^{s}	+13° 11′ 14.6″	5.64	0.69	319	K3III	
15 Ari		15	AV	13325	10155	02^{h} 10^{m} 37.54^{s}	+19° 30′ 01.5″	5.68	−0.87	665	M3III	semiregular variable, V_{max} = 5.67^{m}, V_{min} = 5.74^{m}, P = 5.0320 d
19 Ari		19		13596	10328	02^{h} 13^{m} 03.25^{s}	+15° 16′ 47.7″	5.72	−0.38	541	M0III	suspected variable, V_{max} = 5.68^{m}, V_{min} = 5.76^{m}
μ Ari	μ	34		16811	12640	02^{h} 42^{m} 21.92^{s}	+20° 00′ 41.7″	5.74	0.66	338	A0V	
55 Ari		55		19548	14677	03^{h} 09^{m} 36.73^{s}	+29° 04′ 37.6″	5.74	−1.96	1128	B8III	
7 Ari		7	RR	11763	8993	01^{h} 55^{m} 51.03^{s}	+23° 34′ 38.4″	5.76	−0.26	522	K1III	not variable
ρ^{2} Ari	ρ^{2}	45	RZ	18191	13654	02^{h} 55^{m} 48.50^{s}	+18° 19′ 54.0″	5.76	0.30	403	M6IIIvar	semiregular variable, V_{max} = 5.45^{m}, V_{min} = 6.01^{m}
ο Ari	ο	37		17036	12803	02^{h} 44^{m} 32.97^{s}	+15° 18′ 42.8″	5.78	−0.07	482	B9Vn	
56 Ari	(i)	56	SX	19832	14893	03^{h} 12^{m} 14.24^{s}	+27° 15′ 25.2″	5.78	0.50	371	B9p Si	prototype SX Ari variable, V_{max} = 5.75^{m}, V_{min} = 5.81^{m}, P = 0.727902 d, i Muscae Borealis
20 Ari		20		13871	10540	02^{h} 15^{m} 45.94^{s}	+25° 46′ 59.2″	5.79	2.77	131	F6IV-V	
47 Ari		47		18404	13834	02^{h} 58^{m} 05.08^{s}	+20° 40′ 07.7″	5.80	3.29	104	F5IV	suspected variable
1 Ari A		1		11154	8544	01^{h} 50^{m} 08.58^{s}	+22° 16′ 31.3″	5.83	−0.40	574	K1III+...	binary star
40 Ari		40		17459	13108	02^{h} 48^{m} 32.06^{s}	+18° 17′ 01.9″	5.83	−0.11	502	K1III	
4 Ari		4		10982	8387	01^{h} 48^{m} 10.90^{s}	+16° 57′ 20.3″	5.86	1.14	287	B9.5V	
HD 15524	(f)			15524	11670	02^{h} 30^{m} 32.31^{s}	+25° 14′ 06.8″	5.88	2.34	166	F6IV	f Muscae Borealis
HD 12139				12139	9307	01^{h} 59^{m} 35.60^{s}	+21° 03′ 31.0″	5.89	0.45	399	K0III-IV	
HR 830		(16)	VZ	17471	13121	02^{h} 48^{m} 45.87^{s}	+25° 11′ 17.1″	5.89	0.14	460	A0V	16 Trianguli; Alpha² CVn variable, V_{max} = 5.82^{m}, V_{min} = 5.89^{m}
1 Ari B		1		11155		01^{h} 50^{m} 08.50^{s}	+22° 16′ 33.0″	5.90				component of the 1 Ari system
49 Ari		49		18769	14109	03^{h} 01^{m} 54.15^{s}	+26° 27′ 44.4″	5.91	1.82	214	A3m	suspected variable, V_{max} = 5.90^{m}, V_{min} = 5.94^{m}
59 Ari		59		20618	15514	03^{h} 19^{m} 55.81^{s}	+27° 04′ 16.7″	5.91	1.91	205	G8IV	
54 Cet	χ	(54)		11257	8588	01^{h} 50^{m} 52.01^{s}	+11° 02′ 36.4″	5.93	2.77	139	F2Vw	suspected variable, V_{max} = 5.93^{m}, V_{min} = 5.97^{m}
HD 18700				18700	14036	03^{h} 00^{m} 44.09^{s}	+10° 52′ 13.7″	5.93	0.27	441	K6	
HD 13522				13522	10296	02^{h} 12^{m} 37.51^{s}	+24° 10′ 04.1″	5.96	−0.23	565	K0	
HD 12479				12479	9533	02^{h} 02^{m} 35.08^{s}	+13° 28′ 36.2″	5.97	−1.10	845	M2III	suspected variable
HD 19698				19698	14764	03^{h} 10^{m} 38.78^{s}	+11° 52′ 21.7″	5.97	−0.05	522	B8V	
29 Ari	ω	29		15814	11843	02^{h} 32^{m} 54.15^{s}	+15° 02′ 04.1″	6.00	3.71	94	F8V	
11 Ari		11		12885	9859	02^{h} 06^{m} 49.22^{s}	+25° 42′ 16.5″	6.01	−1.75	1160	B9IV-Vn	
16 Ari		16		13363	10203	02^{h} 11^{m} 12.06^{s}	+25° 56′ 13.0″	6.01	−0.94	801	K4III	
HD 19637				19637	14748	03^{h} 10^{m} 27.04^{s}	+26° 53′ 45.9″	6.02	0.54	406	K3III	
66 Ari		66		21467	16181	03^{h} 28^{m} 26.57^{s}	+22° 48′ 15.4″	6.03	1.83	226	K0IV	
65 Ari		65		21050	15870	03^{h} 24^{m} 26.11^{s}	+20° 48′ 12.6″	6.07	1.23	303	A1V	
HD 12140				12140	9295	01^{h} 59^{m} 25.88^{s}	+12° 17′ 41.8″	6.09	1.51	269	A6V	
HD 19789				19789	14821	03^{h} 11^{m} 21.93^{s}	+13° 02′ 52.1″	6.11	0.99	344	K0IIIp	
53 Ari		53	UW	19374	14514	03^{h} 07^{m} 25.69^{s}	+17° 52′ 47.9″	6.13	−0.69	755	B1.5V	not variable; runaway star
HD 15152				15152	11415	02^{h} 27^{m} 07.26^{s}	+27° 00′ 45.3″	6.14	0.37	464	K5III	suspected variable
26 Ari		26	UU	15550	11678	02^{h} 30^{m} 38.37^{s}	+19° 51′ 19.4″	6.14	1.94	226	A9V	δ Sct variable, V_{max} = 6.10^{m}, V_{min} = 6.15^{m}, P = 0.0676 d
60 Ari		60		20663	15557	03^{h} 20^{m} 25.57^{s}	+25° 39′ 46.7″	6.14	1.40	289	K3III:	
HD 15385				15385	11578	02^{h} 29^{m} 13.63^{s}	+23° 28′ 08.7″	6.20	1.65	264	A5m	
27 Ari	ψ	27		15596	11698	02^{h} 30^{m} 54.38^{s}	+17° 42′ 14.6″	6.21	1.30	313	G5III-IV	
HD 12594	A			12594	9627	02^{h} 03^{m} 42.61^{s}	+18° 15′ 11.8″	6.24	−1.83	1342	K4III	
54 Ari		54		19460	14586	03^{h} 08^{m} 21.09^{s}	+18° 47′ 42.3″	6.25	0.03	570	M0III	semiregular variable, V_{max} = 6.25^{m}, V_{min} = 6.28^{m}
HD 17918				17918	13448	02^{h} 53^{m} 11.66^{s}	+16° 29′ 01.0″	6.30	1.14	352	F5III	
85 Cet		(85)		16861	12647	02^{h} 42^{m} 28.95^{s}	+10° 44′ 30.4″	6.32	0.74	426	A2V	suspected variable, V_{max} = 6.28^{m}, V_{min} = 6.34^{m}
HD 16955				16955	12744	02^{h} 43^{m} 51.25^{s}	+25° 38′ 18.0″	6.35	1.19	352	A3V	
HD 19080				19080	14318	03^{h} 04^{m} 40.65^{s}	+15° 51′ 22.5″	6.37	−0.06	631	K3III	
HD 18928				18928	14232	03^{h} 03^{m} 30.11^{s}	+28° 16′ 11.8″	6.38	2.89	163	F0V	
HD 13201				13201	10050	02^{h} 09^{m} 23.03^{s}	+17° 13′ 28.7″	6.40	3.43	128	F5V	
HD 20367				20367	15323	03^{h} 17^{m} 40.0468^{s}	+31° 07′ 37.9″	6.40	4.23	88	G0V	has a planet (b)
HD 19549				19549	14649	03^{h} 09^{m} 20.10^{s}	+20° 45′ 40.1″	6.41	0.45	506	K2	
HD 19600				19600	14719	03^{h} 10^{m} 08.83^{s}	+27° 49′ 11.6″	6.42	0.09	601	A0V	
HD 14262				14262	10795	02^{h} 18^{m} 57.96^{s}	+23° 10′ 04.2″	6.45	1.34	343	A7V	
36 Ari		36		17017	12784	02^{h} 44^{m} 19.09^{s}	+17° 45′ 50.5″	6.46	0.89	413	K2III	suspected variable, ΔV = 0.07^{m}
UX Ari			UX	21242	16042	03^{h} 26^{m} 35.36^{s}	+28° 42′ 55.2″	6.47	2.97	164	G5IV	RS CVn variable, V_{max} = 6.35^{m}, V_{min} = 6.71^{m}, P = 6.388 d
30 Ari A		30		16246	12189	02^{h} 37^{m} 00.44^{s}	+24° 38′ 50.1″	6.48	3.46	131	F6III	binary star
HD 14067				14067	10657	02^{h} 17^{m} 10.4^{s}	+23° 46′ 04″	6.51	0.44	533	G9 III	has a planet (b)
51 Ari		51		18803	14150	03^{h} 02^{m} 25.87^{s}	+26° 36′ 34.7″	6.62	4.99	69	G8V	
VW Ari			VW	15165	11390	02^{h} 26^{m} 45.65^{s}	+10° 33′ 55.1″	6.69	1.16	416	F0IV	δ Sct variable, V_{max} = 6.64^{m}, V_{min} = 6.76^{m}, P = 0.1606 d
AF Ari			AF	14595	11035	02^{h} 22^{m} 06.62^{s}	+22° 52′ 24.9″	6.71	0.50	615	G3III	Algol type variable, V_{max} = 6.30^{m}, V_{min} = 7.10^{m}, P = 153 d
VY Ari			VY	17433	13118	02^{h} 48^{m} 43.72^{s}	+31° 06′ 54.7″	6.76	3.65	136.5	K0	RS CVn variable, V_{max} = 6.68^{m}, V_{min} = 7.15^{m}, P = 16.1996 d
50 Ari		50		18654	14021	03^{h} 00^{m} 31.50536^{s}	+18° 00′ 17.9143″	6.80			A0V	
23 Ari		23		14305	10810	02^{h} 19^{m} 08.72041^{s}	+19° 41′ 15.7463″	6.83			F8V	
52 Ari B		52		19135		03^{h} 05^{m} 26.70^{s}	+25° 15′ 19.0″	7.00				component of the 52 Ari system
ρ^{1} Ari	ρ^{1}	44		18091	13579	02^{h} 54^{m} 55.17^{s}	+17° 44′ 05.3″	7.01	2.10	313	A3	
30 Ari B		30		16232	12184	02^{h} 36^{m} 57.64^{s}	+24° 38′ 53.1″	7.09	4.11	129	F6V	component of the 30 Ari system; has a planet (b)
R Ari			R	13913	10576	02^{h} 16^{m} 07.11^{s}	+25° 03′ 23.7″	7.40	-2.99	3900	M3-6e	Mira variable, V_{max} = 7.1^{m}, V_{min} = 14.3^{m}, P = 185.67 d
HD 12661				12661	9683	02^{h} 04^{m} 34.29^{s}	+25° 24′ 51.5″	7.44	4.59	121	K0V	has two planets (b & c)
HD 17674				17674	13291	02^{h} 51^{m} 04.3^{s}	+30° 17′ 12″	7.56		145	G0V	has two planets (b)
HD 14787				14787	11130	02^{h} 50^{m} 53.0^{s}	+29° 01′ 21″	7.63		390	G5	has a planet (b)
HIP 14810					14810	03^{h} 11^{m} 14.23^{s}	+21° 05′ 50.5″	8.52	4.90	172	G5V	has three planets (b, c & d)
BD +20°307					8920	01^{h} 54^{m} 50.79^{s}	+21° 18′ 22.5″	9.01	4.19	300	G0V	has a circumstellar disk
X Ari			X	19510	14601	03^{h} 08^{m} 30.89^{s}	+10° 26′ 45.2″	9.04	-1.23	3700	F0.5	RR Lyr variable, V_{max} = 9.036^{m}, V_{min} = 9.966^{m}, P = 0.6511796 d
RX Ari			RX			02^{h} 15^{m} 20.78^{s}	+22° 34′ 11.1″	9.41			F2V	Algol variable, V_{max} = 9.40^{m}, V_{min} = 10.1^{m}, P = 1.029626 d
HAT-P-47						02^{h} 33^{m} 14.0^{s}	+30° 21′ 38″	10.6		874		has a transiting planet (b)
SS Ari			SS			02^{h} 04^{m} 18.41^{s}	+24° 00′ 02.2″	10.15	3.52	692	G0	W UMa variable, V_{max} = 10.10^{m}, V_{min} = 10.63^{m}, P = 0.40598257 d
TT Ari			TT			02^{h} 06^{m} 53.08^{s}	+15° 17′ 41.8″	10.2			Bep:	VY Scl star, V_{max} = 10.2^{m}, V_{min} = 16.5^{m}, P = 0.137551 d
RV Ari			RV			02^{h} 15^{m} 07.50^{s}	+18° 04′ 27.9″	11.61			A0	double-mode δ Sct variable, V_{max} = 11.61^{m}, V_{min} = 12.30^{m}, P = 0.0931281 d
WASP-11/HAT-P-10						03^{h} 09^{m} 28.55^{s}	+30° 40′ 24.9″	11.89	6.41	408	K3V	has a transiting planet (b)
HAT-P-48						02^{h} 57^{m} 53.0^{s}	+30° 37′ 33″	12.16		995		has a transiting planet (b)
L 1159-16			TZ			02^{h} 00^{m} 12.79^{s}	+13° 03′ 11.2″	12.26	13.99	14.5	M4.5	flare star and BY Dra variable
LkHα 264			WY			02^{h} 56^{m} 37.56^{s}	+20° 05′ 37.1″	12.46			K5/6e	T Tau star, V_{max} = 12.25^{m}, V_{min} = 12.88^{m}
RW Ari			RW			02^{h} 16^{m} 03.72^{s}	+17° 31′ 59.0″	12.51			B8	RR Lyr variable, V_{max} = 12.12^{m}, V_{min} = 12.60^{m}, P = 0.3543006 d
HAT-P-25						03^{h} 13^{m} 45^{s}	+25° 11′ 51″	13.19	5.83	969	G5	has a transiting planet (b)
HAT-P-52						02^{h} 50^{m} 53.0^{s}	+29° 01′ 21″	14.07	6.14	1256		has a transiting planet (b)
WX Ari			WX			02^{h} 47^{m} 36.22^{s}	+10° 35′ 37.7″	15.3			CV	VY Scl star and eclipsing binary, V_{max} = 14.5^{m}, V_{min} = <16.7^{m}, P = 0.1393512 d
Teegarden's star						02^{h} 53^{m} 00.89^{s}	+16° 52′ 52.7″	15.40	17.47	12.6	M7.5	
XY Ari			XY			02^{h} 56^{m} 08.19^{s}	+19° 26′ 34.1″				WD+M0V	DQ Her variable and eclipsing binary
PSR B0301+19						03^{h} 04^{m} 33.12^{s}	+19° 32′ 51.4″					pulsar
Table legend: • Name = Proper name • B = Bayer designation • F or/and G. = Flamsteed designation or Gould designation • Var = Variable-star designation • HD = Henry Draper Catalogue designation number • HIP = Hipparcos Catalogue designation number • RA = Right ascension for the Epoch/Equinox J2000.0 • Dec = Declination for the Epoch/Equinox J2000.0 • vis. mag. = visual magnitude (m or m_{v}), also known as apparent magnitude • abs. mag. = absolute magnitude (M_{v}) • Dist. (ly) = Distance in light-years from Earth • Sp. class = Spectral class of the star in the stellar classification system • Notes = Common name(s) or alternate name(s); comments; notable properties [for example: multiple star status, range of variability if it is a variable star, exoplanets, etc.]

== See also ==
- List of stars by constellation
