= Aries in Chinese astronomy =

According to traditional Chinese uranography, the modern constellation Aries is located within the western quadrant of the sky, which is symbolized as the White Tiger of the West (西方白虎, Xī Fāng Bái Hǔ).

The name of the western constellation in modern Chinese is 白羊座 (bái yáng zuò), meaning "the white sheep constellation".

== Stars ==
The map of Chinese constellation in constellation Aries area consists of:

Four Symbols	Mansion (Chinese name)	Romanization	Translation	Asterisms (Chinese name)	Romanization	Translation	Western star name	Proper Name	Chinese star name	Romanization	Translation
White Tiger of the West (西方白虎)	婁	Lóu	Bond	婁	Lóu	Bond					
White Tiger of the West (西方白虎)	婁	Lóu	Bond	婁	Lóu	Bond	β Ari	Sheratan			
White Tiger of the West (西方白虎)	婁	Lóu	Bond	婁	Lóu	Bond	β Ari	Sheratan	婁宿一	Lóusùyī	1st star
White Tiger of the West (西方白虎)	婁	Lóu	Bond	婁	Lóu	Bond	β Ari	Sheratan	婁宿距星	Lóusùjùxīng	Separated star
White Tiger of the West (西方白虎)	婁	Lóu	Bond	婁	Lóu	Bond	β Ari	Sheratan	婁宿中央大星	Lóusùzhōngyāngdàxīng	Big star in the center
White Tiger of the West (西方白虎)	婁	Lóu	Bond	婁	Lóu	Bond	γ Ari	Mesathim (for component A)	婁宿二	Lóusùèr	2nd star
White Tiger of the West (西方白虎)	婁	Lóu	Bond	婁	Lóu	Bond	α Ari	Hamal			
White Tiger of the West (西方白虎)	婁	Lóu	Bond	婁	Lóu	Bond	α Ari	Hamal	婁宿三	Lóusùsān	3rd star
White Tiger of the West (西方白虎)	婁	Lóu	Bond	婁	Lóu	Bond	α Ari	Hamal	婁宿东星	Lóusùdōngxīng	Eastern star
White Tiger of the West (西方白虎)	婁	Lóu	Bond	婁	Lóu	Bond	ι Ari		娄宿增一	Lóusùzēngyī	1st additional star
White Tiger of the West (西方白虎)	婁	Lóu	Bond	婁	Lóu	Bond	λ Ari		娄宿增五	Lóusùzēngwǔ	5th additional star
White Tiger of the West (西方白虎)	婁	Lóu	Bond	婁	Lóu	Bond	10 Ari		娄宿增七	Lóusùzēngqī	7th additional star
White Tiger of the West (西方白虎)	婁	Lóu	Bond	婁	Lóu	Bond	11 Ari		娄宿增八	Lóusùzēngbā	8th additional star
White Tiger of the West (西方白虎)	婁	Lóu	Bond	婁	Lóu	Bond	14 Ari		娄宿增九	Lóusùzēngjiǔ	9th additional star
White Tiger of the West (西方白虎)	婁	Lóu	Bond	婁	Lóu	Bond	20 Ari		娄宿增十	Lóusùzēngshí	10th additional star
White Tiger of the West (西方白虎)	婁	Lóu	Bond	婁	Lóu	Bond	κ Ari		娄宿增十一	Lóusùzēngshíyī	11th additional star
White Tiger of the West (西方白虎)	婁	Lóu	Bond	婁	Lóu	Bond	η Ari	Zuogeng	娄宿增十二	Lóusùzēngshíèr	12th additional star
White Tiger of the West (西方白虎)	婁	Lóu	Bond	婁	Lóu	Bond	θ Ari		娄宿增十三	Lóusùzēngshísān	13th additional star
White Tiger of the West (西方白虎)	婁	Lóu	Bond	婁	Lóu	Bond	15 Ari		娄宿增十四	Lóusùzēngshísì	14th additional star
White Tiger of the West (西方白虎)	婁	Lóu	Bond	婁	Lóu	Bond	19 Ari		娄宿增十五	Lóusùzēngshíwǔ	15th additional star
White Tiger of the West (西方白虎)	婁	Lóu	Bond	左更	Zuǒgēng	Official in Charge of the Forest					
White Tiger of the West (西方白虎)	婁	Lóu	Bond	左更	Zuǒgēng	Official in Charge of the Forest	ν Ari		左更一	Zuǒgēngyī	1st star
White Tiger of the West (西方白虎)	婁	Lóu	Bond	左更	Zuǒgēng	Official in Charge of the Forest	μ Ari		左更二	Zuǒgēngèr	2nd star
White Tiger of the West (西方白虎)	婁	Lóu	Bond	左更	Zuǒgēng	Official in Charge of the Forest	ο Ari		左更三	Zuǒgēngsān	3rd star
White Tiger of the West (西方白虎)	婁	Lóu	Bond	左更	Zuǒgēng	Official in Charge of the Forest	σ Ari		左更四	Zuǒgēngsì	4th star
White Tiger of the West (西方白虎)	婁	Lóu	Bond	左更	Zuǒgēng	Official in Charge of the Forest	π Ari		左更五	Zuǒgēngwu	5th star
White Tiger of the West (西方白虎)	婁	Lóu	Bond	左更	Zuǒgēng	Official in Charge of the Forest	26 Ari		左更增一	Zuǒgēngzēngyī	1st additional star
White Tiger of the West (西方白虎)	婁	Lóu	Bond	左更	Zuǒgēng	Official in Charge of the Forest	40 Ari		左更增二	Zuǒgēngzēngèr	2nd additional star
White Tiger of the West (西方白虎)	婁	Lóu	Bond	左更	Zuǒgēng	Official in Charge of the Forest	44 Ari		左更增三	Zuǒgēngzēngsān	3rd additional star
White Tiger of the West (西方白虎)	婁	Lóu	Bond	左更	Zuǒgēng	Official in Charge of the Forest	ρ³ Ari		左更增四	Zuǒgēngzēngsì	4th additional star
White Tiger of the West (西方白虎)	婁	Lóu	Bond	左更	Zuǒgēng	Official in Charge of the Forest	45 Ari		左更增五	Zuǒgēngzēngwǔ	5th additional star
White Tiger of the West (西方白虎)	婁	Lóu	Bond	左更	Zuǒgēng	Official in Charge of the Forest	47 Ari		左更增六	Zuǒgēngzēngliù	6th additional star
White Tiger of the West (西方白虎)	婁	Lóu	Bond	左更	Zuǒgēng	Official in Charge of the Forest	ε Ari		左更增七	Zuǒgēngzēngqī	7th additional star
White Tiger of the West (西方白虎)	婁	Lóu	Bond	左更	Zuǒgēng	Official in Charge of the Forest	HD 17918		左更增八	Zuǒgēngzēngbā	8th additional star
White Tiger of the West (西方白虎)	婁	Lóu	Bond	右更	Yòugēng	Official in Charge of Pasturing	54 Ceti		右更增三	Yòugēngzēngsān	3rd additional star
White Tiger of the West (西方白虎)	胃	Wèi	Stomach	胃	Wèi	Stomach					
White Tiger of the West (西方白虎)	胃	Wèi	Stomach	胃	Wèi	Stomach	35 Ari	Weixiu			
White Tiger of the West (西方白虎)	胃	Wèi	Stomach	胃	Wèi	Stomach	35 Ari	Weixiu	胃宿一	Wèisùyī	1st star
White Tiger of the West (西方白虎)	胃	Wèi	Stomach	胃	Wèi	Stomach	35 Ari	Weixiu	胃宿距星	Wèisùjùxīng	Separated star
White Tiger of the West (西方白虎)	胃	Wèi	Stomach	胃	Wèi	Stomach	35 Ari	Weixiu	胃宿西南星	Wèisùxīnánxīng	Southwestern star
White Tiger of the West (西方白虎)	胃	Wèi	Stomach	胃	Wèi	Stomach	39 Ari	Lilii Borea	胃宿二	Wèisùèr	2nd star
White Tiger of the West (西方白虎)	胃	Wèi	Stomach	胃	Wèi	Stomach	41 Ari	Bharani for component Aa)	胃宿三	Wèisùsān	3rd star
White Tiger of the West (西方白虎)	胃	Wèi	Stomach	胃	Wèi	Stomach	52 Ari		胃宿增四	Wèisùzēngsì	4th additional star
White Tiger of the West (西方白虎)	胃	Wèi	Stomach	胃	Wèi	Stomach	33 Ari		胃宿增五	Wèisùzēngwǔ	5th additional star
White Tiger of the West (西方白虎)	胃	Wèi	Stomach	天囷	Tiānqūn	Circular Celestial Granary					
White Tiger of the West (西方白虎)	胃	Wèi	Stomach	天囷	Tiānqūn	Circular Celestial Granary	ξ Ari		天囷增七	Tiānqūnzēngqī	7th additional star
White Tiger of the West (西方白虎)	胃	Wèi	Stomach	天囷	Tiānqūn	Circular Celestial Granary	31 Ari		天囷增八	Tiānqūnzēngbā	8th additional star
White Tiger of the West (西方白虎)	胃	Wèi	Stomach	天囷	Tiānqūn	Circular Celestial Granary	85 Cet		天囷增九	Tiānqūnzēngjiǔ	9th additional star
White Tiger of the West (西方白虎)	昴	Mǎo	Hairy Head								
White Tiger of the West (西方白虎)	昴	Mǎo	Hairy Head	天河	Tiānhé	Celestial River	62 Ari		天河	Tiānhé	(One star of)
White Tiger of the West (西方白虎)	昴	Mǎo	Hairy Head	天陰	Tiānyīn	Yin Force					
White Tiger of the West (西方白虎)	昴	Mǎo	Hairy Head	天陰	Tiānyīn	Yin Force	63 Ari		天陰一	Tiānyīnyī	1st star
White Tiger of the West (西方白虎)	昴	Mǎo	Hairy Head	天陰	Tiānyīn	Yin Force	ζ Ari		天陰二	Tiānyīnèr	2nd star
White Tiger of the West (西方白虎)	昴	Mǎo	Hairy Head	天陰	Tiānyīn	Yin Force	τ Ari		天陰三	Tiānyīnsān	3rd star
White Tiger of the West (西方白虎)	昴	Mǎo	Hairy Head	天陰	Tiānyīn	Yin Force	δ Ari	Botein	天陰四	Tiānyīnsì	4th star
White Tiger of the West (西方白虎)	昴	Mǎo	Hairy Head	天陰	Tiānyīn	Yin Force	65 Ari		天陰五	Tiānyīnwǔ	5th star
White Tiger of the West (西方白虎)	昴	Mǎo	Hairy Head	天陰	Tiānyīn	Yin Force	54 Ari		天陰增一	Tiānyīnzēngyī	1st additional star
White Tiger of the West (西方白虎)	昴	Mǎo	Hairy Head	天陰	Tiānyīn	Yin Force	64 Ari		天陰增二	Tiānyīnzēngèr	2nd additional star
White Tiger of the West (西方白虎)	昴	Mǎo	Hairy Head	天陰	Tiānyīn	Yin Force	HD 19549		天陰增五	Tiānyīnzēngwǔ	5th additional star

== See also ==
- Chinese astronomy
- Traditional Chinese star names
- Chinese constellations
