= Tau Arietis =

The Bayer designation Tau Arietis (τ Ari, τ Arietis) is shared by two star systems, in the constellation Aries:

- τ^{1} Arietis
- τ^{2} Arietis

They are separated by 0.54°.

== See also ==
- TZ Arietis
- Theta Arietis
