= 55 Arietis =

Star in the constellation Aries

Observation data Epoch J2000 Equinox ICRS
- Constellation: Aries
- Right ascension: 03^{h} 09^{m} 36.74081^{s}
- Declination: +29° 04′ 37.4947″
- Apparent magnitude (V): 5.72

Characteristics
- Evolutionary stage: subgiant
- Spectral type: B8 III
- U−B color index: –0.15
- B−V color index: +0.115±0.005

Astrometry
Radial velocity (R_{v})	−2.0±4.3 km/s
Proper motion (μ)	RA: +20.368 mas/yr Dec.: −12.531 mas/yr
Parallax (π)	3.7356±0.0846 mas
Distance	870 ± 20 ly (268 ± 6 pc)
Absolute magnitude (M_{V})	−1.75

Details
Mass	4.1 M_{☉}
Radius	9.2 R_{☉}
Luminosity	916 L_{☉}
Surface gravity (log g)	2.948±0.023 cgs
Temperature	11,097 K
Rotational velocity (v sin i)	196±10 km/s
Age	306 Myr

Other designations
- 55 Ari, BD+28°499, FK5 1088, GC 3762, HD 19548, HIP 14677, HR 944, SAO 75757

Database references
SIMBAD	data

55 Arietis is a single star in the northern zodiac constellation of Aries. 55 Arietis is the Flamsteed designation. It is faintly visible to the naked eye as a dim, blue-white hued point of light with an apparent visual magnitude of 5.72. Based upon an annual parallax shift of 3.7 mas, it is approximately 870 light-years (270 parsecs) distant from Earth, give or take a 30 light-year margin of error. Eggen (1995) listed it as a proper motion candidate for membership in the IC 2391 supercluster. It may be a runaway star, having a peculiar velocity of 25.9+3.9
−6.1 km/s relative to its neighbors.

The spectrum of this star matches a B-type giant with a stellar classification of B8 III. It has a high rate of spin, showing a projected rotational velocity of 196 km/s. The star has 4.1 times the mass of the Sun but 9.2 times the Sun's radius. It is radiating 916 times as much luminosity as the Sun from its photosphere at an effective temperature of 11,097 K.
