= 36 Arietis =

Star in the constellation Aries

Observation data Epoch J2000.0 Equinox J2000.0 (ICRS)
- Constellation: Aries
- Right ascension: 02^{h} 44^{m} 19.11285^{s}
- Declination: +17° 45′ 50.1359″
- Apparent magnitude (V): 6.40

Characteristics
- Evolutionary stage: red giant branch
- Spectral type: K2 III
- B−V color index: 1.143±0.008

Astrometry
Radial velocity (R_{v})	−34.29±0.29 km/s
Proper motion (μ)	RA: +36.836 mas/yr Dec.: −36.203 mas/yr
Parallax (π)	8.7094±0.0252 mas
Distance	374 ± 1 ly (114.8 ± 0.3 pc)
Absolute magnitude (M_{V})	1.45±0.11

Details
Mass	1.06±0.30 M_{☉}
Radius	9.82+0.13 −0.47 R_{☉}
Luminosity	44.16±0.29 L_{☉}
Surface gravity (log g)	2.59±0.11 cgs
Temperature	4,749±92 K
Metallicity [Fe/H]	0.24 dex
Age	1.95+0.68 −0.50 Gyr

Other designations
- 36 Ari, BD+17°426, FK5 2190, GC 3294, HD 17017, HIP 12784, HR 808, SAO 93081

Database references
SIMBAD	data

36 Arietis is a star in the northern constellation of Aries. 36 Arietis is the Flamsteed designation. It is a dim, orange-hued star that is a challenge to view with the naked eye, having an apparent visual magnitude of 6.40. Based upon an annual parallax shift of 8.71±0.02 mas, this star is located 374 light-years (114.8 parsecs) away from the Sun. It is moving closer to the Earth with a heliocentric radial velocity of −34 km/s, and is a member of the Wolf 630 moving group of stars that share a common motion through space.

This object is an evolved giant star with a stellar classification of K2 III. It is around two million years old with a similar mass as the Sun. With the hydrogen at its core exhausted, the star has expanded to ten times the girth of the Sun. It has a higher than solar metallicity, showing a high abundance of iron in its spectrum. The star is radiating 44 times the Sun's luminosity from its enlarged photosphere at an effective temperature of 4,749 K.
