= 4 Arietis =

Star in the constellation Aries

Observation data Epoch J2000.0 Equinox J2000.0
- Constellation: Aries
- Right ascension: 01^{h} 48^{m} 10.92137^{s}
- Declination: +16° 57′ 19.8483″
- Apparent magnitude (V): 5.86

Characteristics
- Evolutionary stage: main sequence
- Spectral type: B9.5 V

Astrometry
Radial velocity (R_{v})	+5.7±1.9 km/s
Proper motion (μ)	RA: +65.608 mas/yr Dec.: −29.291 mas/yr
Parallax (π)	11.4613±0.1511 mas
Distance	285 ± 4 ly (87 ± 1 pc)

Details
Mass	2.83 or 2.48±0.02 M_{☉}
Radius	2.2 R_{☉}
Luminosity	40.4±1.9 L_{☉}
Surface gravity (log g)	4.47±0.14 cgs
Temperature	10,913±371 K
Rotational velocity (v sin i)	33 km/s
Age	257 Myr

Other designations
- 4 Ari, BD+16°203, FK5 1050, HD 10982, HIP 8387, HR 522, SAO 92637

Database references
SIMBAD	data

4 Arietis is a single star in the northern constellation of Aries, the ram. 4 Arietis is the Flamsteed designation. It is visible to the naked eye as a dim, blue-white hued star with an apparent visual magnitude of 5.86. The star has an annual parallax shift of 11.46±0.15 mas, which is equivalent to a distance of 285 light-years (87 parsecs) from the Sun. It is moving further from the Earth with a heliocentric radial velocity of +6 km/s.

This is a B-type main sequence star with a stellar classification of B9.5 V. It is 257 million years old and is spinning with a projected rotational velocity of 33 km/s. The star has more than double the mass of the Sun and around 2.2 times the Sun's radius. It is radiating 40 times the Sun's luminosity from its photosphere at an effective temperature of 10,913 K.
