= HD 12139 =

Star in the constellation Aries

Observation data Epoch J2000 Equinox J2000
- Constellation: Aries
- Right ascension: 01^{h} 59^{m} 35.68355^{s}
- Declination: 21° 03′ 30.8478″
- Apparent magnitude (V): 5.89

Characteristics
- Evolutionary stage: red giant branch
- Spectral type: K0III-IV
- B−V color index: 1.031±0.015

Astrometry
Radial velocity (R_{v})	−1.65±0.20 km/s
Proper motion (μ)	RA: +141.358 mas/yr Dec.: −14.694 mas/yr
Parallax (π)	9.3842±0.0637 mas
Distance	348 ± 2 ly (106.6 ± 0.7 pc)
Absolute magnitude (M_{V})	0.50

Details
Mass	1.69±0.48 M_{☉}
Radius	11.12+0.34 −0.13 R_{☉}
Luminosity	58.2±0.7 L_{☉}
Surface gravity (log g)	2.50±0.11 cgs
Temperature	4,780+120 −70 K
Metallicity [Fe/H]	−0.02±0.05 dex
Age	2.0+1.0 −0.6 Gyr

Other designations
- BD+20°322, HD 12139, HIP 9307, HR 577, SAO 75077, WDS J01596+2100D

Database references
SIMBAD	data

HD 12139 is an orange-hued star in the northern zodiac constellation of Aries. With an apparent visual magnitude of 5.89, it is a dim star that is just visible to the naked eye under good viewing conditions. It is located approximately 348 light-years (106.6 pc) distant from the Sun, based on parallax, but is drifting closer with a radial velocity of −2 km/s. With high probability, it is considered a member of the Hercules stream.

This object is an aging red giant with a stellar classification of K0III-IV, meaning that it has used up its core hydrogen and is expanding. At present it has 11 times the girth of the Sun. The star is about two billion years old with 1.7 times the mass of the Sun. It is radiating 58 times the luminosity of the Sun from its photosphere at an effective temperature of 4,780 K.

A magnitude 9.36 companion is located at an angular separation of 199.70″ from the primary along a position angle of 9°, as of 2015. It is unclear if the two are physically associated.
