= 59 Arietis =

Star in the constellation Aries

Observation data Epoch J2000 Equinox ICRS
- Constellation: Aries
- Right ascension: 03^{h} 19^{m} 55.79556^{s}
- Declination: +27° 04′ 16.0661″
- Apparent magnitude (V): 5.91

Characteristics
- Spectral type: G7 IV
- B−V color index: 0.860±0.015

Astrometry
Radial velocity (R_{v})	−4.67±0.14 km/s
Proper motion (μ)	RA: −25.853 mas/yr Dec.: −72.813 mas/yr
Parallax (π)	15.3970±0.0621 mas
Distance	211.8 ± 0.9 ly (64.9 ± 0.3 pc)
Absolute magnitude (M_{V})	1.78

Details
Mass	1.96±0.30 M_{☉}
Radius	5.76±0.27 R_{☉}
Luminosity	19.5+1.9 −3.6 L_{☉}
Surface gravity (log g)	3.21 cgs
Temperature	5,044 K
Metallicity [Fe/H]	−0.06 dex
Rotational velocity (v sin i)	1.8 km/s
Age	1.7+0.4 −0.3 Gyr

Other designations
- 59 Ari, BD+26°540, HD 20618, HIP 15514, HR 995, SAO 75863

Database references
SIMBAD	data

59 Arietis is a star in the northern constellation of Aries. 59 Arietis is the Flamsteed designation. It is dimly visible to the naked eye with an apparent visual magnitude of 5.91. Based upon an annual parallax shift of 15.40±0.06 mas, it is located approximately 212 light-years (65 parsecs) distant from the Sun. The star is moving closer to the Earth with a heliocentric radial velocity of −4.7 km/s.

The spectrum of this object is that of a subgiant star with a stellar classification of G7 IV, which would suggest it has exhausted the supply of hydrogen at its core and has begun to evolve into a giant star. It is around 1.7 billion years old with a projected rotational velocity of 1.8 km/s. The star has nearly double the mass of the Sun and almost six times the Sun's radius. It is radiating 20 times the luminosity of the Sun from its photosphere at an effective temperature of 5,044 K.
