= 21 Arietis =

Binary star system in the constellation Aries

Observation data Epoch J2000 Equinox ICRS
- Constellation: Aries
- Right ascension: 02^{h} 15^{m} 42.77662^{s}
- Declination: +25° 02′ 34.9627″
- Apparent magnitude (V): 5.57 (6.40/6.48)

Characteristics
- Spectral type: F6 V
- U−B color index: +0.00
- B−V color index: +0.50

Astrometry
Radial velocity (R_{v})	−44.3 km/s
Proper motion (μ)	RA: −89.72 mas/yr Dec.: −86.42 mas/yr
Parallax (π)	19.58±0.61 mas
Distance	167 ± 5 ly (51 ± 2 pc)
Absolute magnitude (M_{V})	2.03

Orbit
Period (P)	23.70 ± 0.12 yr
Semi-major axis (a)	0.2353 ± 0.0011″
Eccentricity (e)	0.6816 ± 0.0037
Inclination (i)	104.52 ± 0.16°
Longitude of the node (Ω)	236.44 ± 0.22°
Periastron epoch (T)	1986.192 ± 0.012
Argument of periastron (ω) (secondary)	84.16 ± 0.16°

Details

21 Ari A
Mass	1.338 ± 0.032 M_{☉}
Surface gravity (log g)	4.12 cgs
Temperature	6,299 K
Metallicity [Fe/H]	+0.02 dex
Rotational velocity (v sin i)	12.6 km/s
Age	2.2 Gyr

21 Ari B
Mass	1.374 ± 0.027 M_{☉}

Other designations
- BD+24 329, FK5 1059, HD 13872, HIP 10535, HR 657, SAO 75238, WDS J02157+2503.

Database references
SIMBAD	data

21 Arietis (abbreviated 21 Ari) is a binary star system in the northern constellation of Aries. 21 Arietis is the Flamsteed designation. It has a combined apparent visual magnitude is 5.57; the brighter member is magnitude 6.40 while the fainter star is magnitude 6.48. The distance to this star system, based upon an annual parallax shift of 19.58 mas, is 167 light-years (51 parsecs). The pair orbit each other with a period of 23.70 years and an eccentricity of 0.68.

The system was initially thought to be a triple system in 1981, since the orbit of the system predicted a mass greater than would be expected from its F6V spectral type. This was later rejected because the distance to the system was overestimated. However, while observing the spectrum of the system, it was found that a giant planet may be causing radial velocity variations. The purported planet would have a mass of 1.40 ± 0.36 M_{J}, an orbital period of 925 days and orbit the primary star.
