= HD 20367 =

Star in the constellation Aries

Observation data Epoch J2000.0 Equinox J2000.0 (ICRS)
- Constellation: Aries
- Right ascension: 03^{h} 17^{m} 40.04683^{s}
- Declination: +31° 07′ 37.3604″
- Apparent magnitude (V): 6.40

Characteristics
- Evolutionary stage: main sequence
- Spectral type: F8V
- B−V color index: 0.574

Astrometry
Radial velocity (R_{v})	6.47±0.15 km/s
Proper motion (μ)	RA: −101.950±0.031 mas/yr Dec.: −58.033±0.028 mas/yr
Parallax (π)	38.3758±0.0318 mas
Distance	84.99 ± 0.07 ly (26.06 ± 0.02 pc)
Absolute magnitude (M_{V})	4.27

Details
Mass	1.13±0.10 M_{☉}
Radius	1.12+0.03 −0.01 R_{☉}
Luminosity	1.576±0.004 L_{☉}
Surface gravity (log g)	4.53±0.22 cgs
Temperature	6,100+36 −60 K
Metallicity [Fe/H]	0.17±0.10 dex
Rotational velocity (v sin i)	5.5 km/s
Age	2.98 Gyr

Other designations
- BD+30°520, GC 3929, HD 20367, HIP 15323, SAO 56323

Database references
SIMBAD	data
Exoplanet Archive	data

HD 20367 is a star in the constellation of Aries, close to the border with Perseus. It is a yellow-white hued star that is a challenge to view with the naked eye, having an apparent visual magnitude of 6.40. Based upon parallax measurements, it is located 85 light years from the Sun. It is drifting further away with a radial velocity of +6.5 km/s. Based upon its movement through space, it is a candidate member of the Ursa Major Moving Group of co-moving stars that probably share a common origin.

This object is a late F-type main-sequence star with a stellar classification of F8V. It is about three billion years old and is spinning with a projected rotational velocity of 5.5 km/s. The star is 12% larger and 13% more massive than the Sun. It is radiating 1.58 times the luminosity of the Sun from its photosphere at an effective temperature of 6,100 K.

== Claims of a planetary system ==
In June 2002, an announcement was made that a Jupiter-mass or larger extrasolar planet had been found orbiting the star, with a period of 1.285 years and an eccentricity of 0.32. The eccentric nature of this planet's orbit meant that it spends part of each circuit around the star outside the habitable zone. However, subsequent observations in 2009 put the existence of this planet in doubt.

The HD 20367 planetary system
Companion (in order from star)	Mass	Semimajor axis (AU)	Orbital period (days)	Eccentricity	Inclination (°)	Radius
b (unconfirmed)	>1.17 M_{J}	1.246±0.075	469.5±9.3	0.320±0.090	—	—

== See also ==
- List of extrasolar planets
