= HIP 14810 d =

Extrasolar planet in the constellation Aries

Discovery
- Discovered by: J.T. Wright et al.
- Discovery date: 2009
- Detection method: Radial velocity

Orbital characteristics
- Semi-major axis: 1.94±0.13 AU
- Eccentricity: 0.185±0.035
- Orbital period (sidereal): 981.8±6.9 d
- Time of periastron: 2464194±40
- Argument of periastron: 247±12
- Semi-amplitude: 12.17±0.46
- Star: HIP 14810

HIP 14810 d is an extrasolar planet approximately 165 light-years away in the constellation of Aries. This planet has mass at least 0.57 times that of Jupiter and orbits at 1.89 AU in an eccentric orbit.
