= 1 Arietis =

Double star in the constellation Aries

Observation data Epoch J2000 Equinox ICRS
- Constellation: Aries
- Right ascension: 01^{h} 50^{m} 08.56984^{s}
- Declination: +22° 16′ 31.2100″
- Apparent magnitude (V): 5.86 (6.4/7.2)

Characteristics
- Spectral type: K1 III + A6 V
- U−B color index: +0.5
- B−V color index: +0.74

Astrometry
Radial velocity (R_{v})	6.95±0.13 km/s
Proper motion (μ)	RA: –16.52 mas/yr Dec.: –8.25 mas/yr
Parallax (π)	5.57±0.75 mas
Distance	approx. 590 ly (approx. 180 pc)
Absolute magnitude (M_{V})	−0.39

Details
Luminosity	141.51 L_{☉}

Other designations
- 1 Ari, BD+21°243, HIP 8544, HR 530, SAO 74966, ADS 1457, WDS J01501+2217
- 1 Ari A: HD 11154.
- 1 Ari B: HD 11155.

Database references
SIMBAD	data

1 Arietis is a double star in the northern constellation of Aries. 1 Arietis is the Flamsteed designation. The pair has a combined visual magnitude of 5.86, making it faintly visible to the naked eye. Based upon an annual parallax shift of 5.57 mas, the distance to the two stars is approximately 590 light-years (180 parsecs). As of 2016, the secondary had an angular separation of 2.90″ along a position angle of 165° from the primary. They are moving further from the Earth with a heliocentric radial velocity of +7 km/s.

The brighter star, designated component A, is a magnitude 6.40 giant star with a stellar classification of K1 III. The companion star, component B, is a magnitude 7.20 A-type main sequence star with a classification of A6 V. Helmut Abt (1985) had this star classified as A3 IV, matching a more evolved subgiant.
