= HD 15524 =

Binary star system in the constellation Aries

Observation data Epoch J2000 Equinox ICRS
- Constellation: Aries
- Right ascension: 02^{h} 30^{m} 32.3544^{s}
- Declination: +25° 14′ 06.107″
- Apparent magnitude (V): 5.90 (5.97 / 10.4)

Characteristics

HD 15524 A
- Spectral type: F6 IV or F4 V
- B−V color index: 0.412±0.006

Astrometry
Radial velocity (R_{v})	−9.60±1.5 km/s
Proper motion (μ)	RA: +62.407±0.027 mas/yr Dec.: −75.827±0.026 mas/yr
Parallax (π)	19.32±0.44 mas
Distance	169 ± 4 ly (52 ± 1 pc)
Absolute magnitude (M_{V})	2.44

Details

HD 15524 A
Mass	1.31 M_{☉}
Luminosity	10.01 L_{☉}
Surface gravity (log g)	3.92±0.14 cgs
Temperature	6,665±227 K
Metallicity [Fe/H]	0.11±0.05 dex
Rotational velocity (v sin i)	59.8±3.0 km/s
Age	1.633 Gyr

Other designations
- BD+24°358, FK5 2171, HD 15524, HIP 11670, HR 728, SAO 75407

Database references
SIMBAD	data

HD 15524 is a wide binary star in the northern zodiac constellation of Aries. Located approximately 51.76 parsecs (168.8 ly) away, the primary, a yellow-white subgiant or main sequence star has an apparent magnitude of 5.97, meaning that it can be viewed with the naked eye under good conditions. The secondary, separated from the primary by 12.4 arcseconds, has an apparent magnitude of 10.4.

This system is the likely source of X-ray emission coming from these coordinates.
