= HIP 14810 =

Star in the constellation Aries

Observation data Epoch J2000 Equinox ICRS
- Constellation: Aries
- Right ascension: 03^{h} 11^{m} 14.2302^{s}
- Declination: +21° 05′ 50.493″
- Apparent magnitude (V): 8.585±0.016

Characteristics
- Evolutionary stage: main sequence
- Spectral type: G6V
- B−V color index: 0.777±0.021

Astrometry
Radial velocity (R_{v})	−5.121±0.681 km/s
Proper motion (μ)	RA: −3.784±0.087 mas/yr Dec.: −53.154±0.070 mas/yr
Parallax (π)	19.7810±0.0449 mas
Distance	164.9 ± 0.4 ly (50.6 ± 0.1 pc)
Absolute magnitude (M_{V})	4.89

Details
Mass	0.98±0.02 M_{☉}
Radius	1.08±0.03 R_{☉}
Luminosity	0.99±0.01 L_{☉}
Surface gravity (log g)	4.35±0.03 cgs
Temperature	5,535±51 K
Metallicity [Fe/H]	0.28±0.06 dex
Rotational velocity (v sin i)	0.54±0.5 km/s
Age	8.7±2.0 Gyr Gyr

Other designations
- AG+20 283, BD+20°518, HIP 14810, SAO 75776, PPM 92274, TYC 1231-1727-1, GSC 01231-01727

Database references
SIMBAD	data
Exoplanet Archive	data

HIP 14810 is a star with three exoplanetary companions in the northern constellation of Aries. It positioned about 1.3° to the north of Delta Arietis, but is too faint to be visible to the naked eye with an apparent visual magnitude of 8.6. The system is located at a distance of 165 light-years from the Sun based on parallax measurements, but is drifting closer with a radial velocity of −5 km/s.

This is an ordinary G-type main-sequence star with a stellar classification of G6V. It has a relatively low activity level and a low projected rotational velocity of 0.5 km/s, which indicates it is an old star with an age of around eight billion years. The star has a high metallicity with a mass and luminosity about the same as the Sun.

== Planetary system ==
Orbiting the star are three confirmed planets. The discovery paper for HIP 14810 b and HIP 14810 c was published in 2007, while that for HIP 14810 d was published in 2009, together with a revision for the orbital parameters for planet c. Simulations suggest that the orbits of these planets do not allow a stable orbit for a hypothetical super-earth in the habitable zone.

The HIP 14810 planetary system
Companion (in order from star)	Mass	Semimajor axis (AU)	Orbital period (days)	Eccentricity	Inclination (°)	Radius
b	≥3.9±0.49 M_{J}	0.0696±0.0044	6.673892±0.000008	0.14399±0.00087	—	—
c	≥1.31±0.18 M_{J}	0.549±0.034	147.747±0.029	0.1566±0.0099	—	—
d	≥0.59±0.1 M_{J}	1.94±0.13	981.8±6.9	0.185±0.035	—	—

== See also ==
- Lists of exoplanets
