= VZ Arietis =

Star in the constellation Aries

Observation data Epoch J2000 Equinox ICRS
- Constellation: Aries
- Right ascension: 02^{h} 48^{m} 45.90326^{s}
- Declination: +25° 11′ 16.9880″
- Apparent magnitude (V): 5.82–5.89

Characteristics
- Evolutionary stage: main sequence
- Spectral type: A0 V
- B−V color index: −0.033±0.005
- Variable type: α^{2} CVn

Astrometry
Radial velocity (R_{v})	+13.8±2.9 km/s
Proper motion (μ)	RA: +60.139 mas/yr Dec.: −2.475 mas/yr
Parallax (π)	6.2922±0.1856 mas
Distance	520 ± 20 ly (159 ± 5 pc)
Absolute magnitude (M_{V})	+0.48

Details
Mass	2.74±0.09 M_{☉}
Radius	3.1 R_{☉}
Luminosity	78.7+15.1 −12.7 L_{☉}
Surface gravity (log g)	4.10 cgs
Temperature	10,304+72 −71 K
Metallicity [Fe/H]	+0.1 dex
Rotational velocity (v sin i)	54 km/s

Other designations
- 16 Trianguli, VZ Arietis, BD+24°396, FK5 5868, HD 17471, HIP 13121, HR 830, SAO 75588

Database references
SIMBAD	data

VZ Arietis is single, white-hued star in the northern zodiac constellation of Aries. Varying between magnitudes 5.82 and 5.89, the star can be seen with the naked eye in dark, unpolluted areas. Based upon an annual parallax shift of 5.8 mas, it is located 560 light-years from the Sun. It is moving further away with a heliocentric radial velocity of +14 km/s. The star was formerly known as 16 Trianguli, but as the star is no longer in the constellation Triangulum, this designation has fallen out of use.

In 1984, the Czechoslovak astronomer Juraj Zverko announced that the star, then called HR 830, is a variable star. It was given its variable star designation, VZ Arietis, in 1987.

This is a chemically peculiar star of type CP2 (Ap star), showing an anomalous abundance of silicon in its spectrum. It has a stellar classification of A0 V, which indicates this is an A-type main-sequence star that currently fusing hydrogen into helium in its core. This is an Alpha^{2} Canum Venaticorum variable with 2.7 times the mass of the Sun and about 3.1 times the Sun's radius. It is radiating 79 times the Sun's luminosity from its photosphere at an effective temperature of 10,304 K.
