= 27 Arietis =

Star in the constellation Aries

Observation data Epoch J2000.0 Equinox J2000.0 (ICRS)
- Constellation: Aries
- Right ascension: 02^{h} 30^{m} 54.39715^{s}
- Declination: +17° 42′ 13.8908″
- Apparent magnitude (V): 6.21

Characteristics
- Spectral type: G8 III-IV Fe-2
- B−V color index: 0.908±0.002

Astrometry
Radial velocity (R_{v})	−122.71±0.28 km/s
Proper motion (μ)	RA: +33.774 mas/yr Dec.: −82.912 mas/yr
Parallax (π)	11.6403±0.1172 mas
Distance	280 ± 3 ly (85.9 ± 0.9 pc)
Absolute magnitude (M_{V})	1.48

Orbit
Period (P)	130.706±0.008 d
Eccentricity (e)	0.366±0.007
Periastron epoch (T)	53,480.1±0.4 MJD
Argument of periastron (ω) (secondary)	275.5±0.7°
Semi-amplitude (K_{1}) (primary)	5.98±0.05 km/s

Details
Mass	1.29 M_{☉}
Radius	7.04+0.29 −0.28 R_{☉}
Luminosity	28.43 L_{☉}
Surface gravity (log g)	2.77±0.21 cgs
Temperature	4,788±49 K
Metallicity [Fe/H]	−0.65±0.02 dex
Rotational velocity (v sin i)	1.6 km/s
Age	5.44 Gyr

Other designations
- 27 Ari, BD+17°380, FK5 1069, HD 15596, HIP 11698, HR 731, SAO 92983

Database references
SIMBAD	data

27 Arietis is a binary star system in the northern constellation of Aries. 27 Arietis is the Flamsteed designation. It is a dim, yellow-hued star that is close to the lower limit of what can be viewed with the naked eye, having an apparent visual magnitude is 6.21. The annual parallax shift of 11.64±0.12 mas corresponds to a physical distance of approximately 280 light-years (86 parsecs) from Earth. It is advancing closer to the Earth with a heliocentric radial velocity of −122.7 km/s, and may come as close as 84 light-years in around 643,000 years.

This appears to be a single-lined spectroscopic binary system with an orbital period of 130.7 days and an eccentricity of 0.366. It has an "a sin i" value of 10.00 ± 0.08 Gm (0.06685 ± 0.00053 AU), where a is the semimajor axis and i is the inclination to the line of sight from the Earth. This value provides a lower bound on the actual semimajor axis. The visible component has a stellar classification of G8 III-IV Fe-2, displaying mixed spectral traits of an evolved subgiant and a giant star, with a strong underabundance of iron. The CN bands of this star are very weak.
