= 38 Arietis =

Star in the constellation Aries

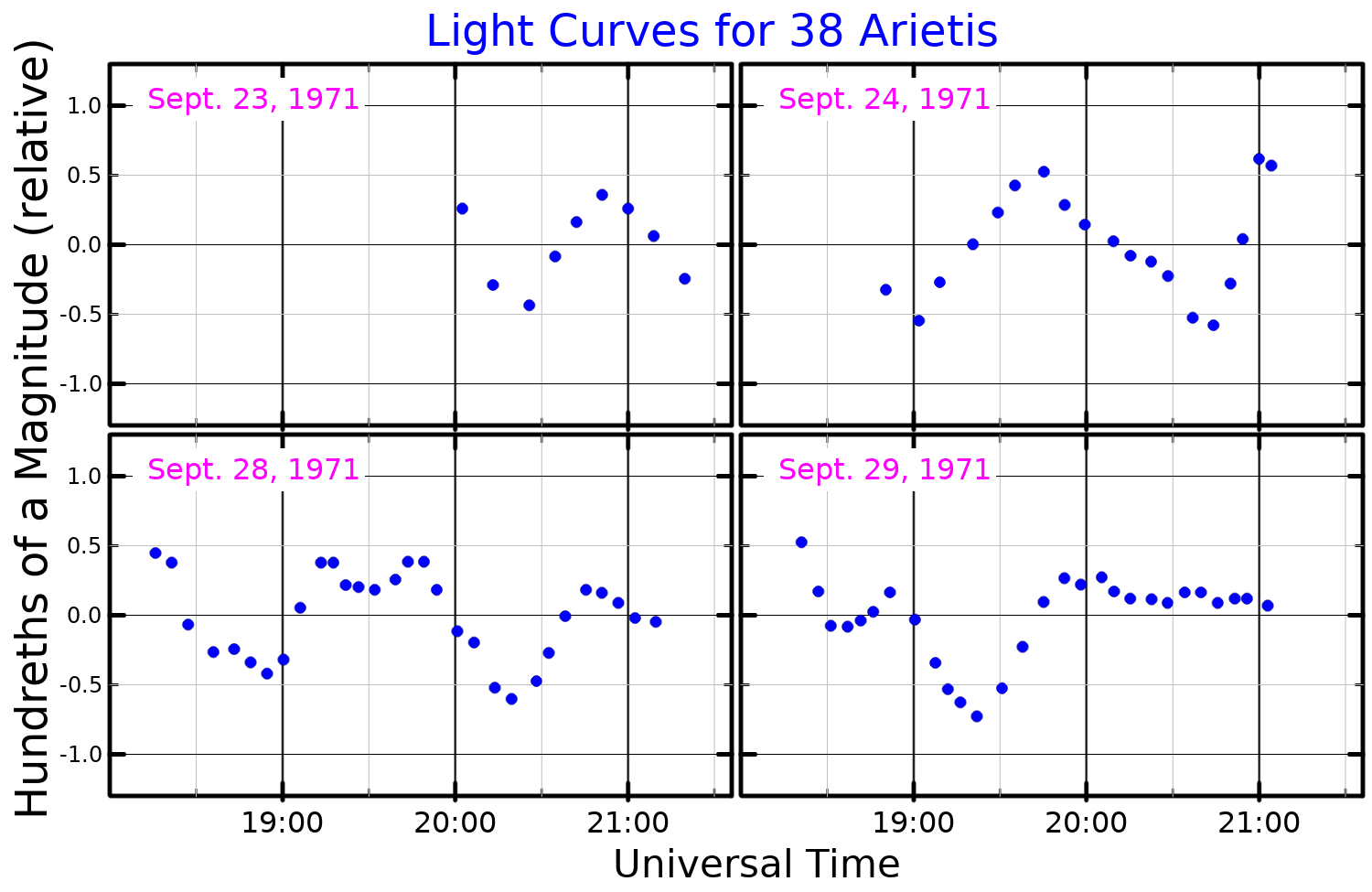
- Four visual band light curves for 38 Arietis, adapted from Valtier et al. (1974)

Observation data Epoch J2000 Equinox ICRS
- Constellation: Aries
- Right ascension: 02^{h} 44^{m} 57.57945^{s}
- Declination: +12° 26′ 44.7297″
- Apparent magnitude (V): +5.18 - 5.22

Characteristics
- Spectral type: A7 III-IV
- U−B color index: +0.121
- B−V color index: +0.235
- Variable type: δ Sct

Astrometry
Radial velocity (R_{v})	-1.5 km/s
Proper motion (μ)	RA: +120.49 mas/yr Dec.: -85.78 mas/yr
Parallax (π)	27.52±0.40 mas
Distance	119 ± 2 ly (36.3 ± 0.5 pc)
Absolute magnitude (M_{V})	2.22

Details
Radius	2.1 R_{☉}
Luminosity	11 L_{☉}
Surface gravity (log g)	4.04 cgs
Temperature	7,638 K
Rotational velocity (v sin i)	86 km/s
Age	0.58 Gyr

Other designations
- UV Arietis, BD+11°377, HD 17093, HIP 12832, HR 812, SAO 93083

Database references
SIMBAD	data

38 Arietis (abbreviated 38 Ari) is a variable star in the northern constellation of Aries. 38 Arietis is the Flamsteed designation. It was once designated 88 Ceti, forming part of the neighboring constellation of Cetus. With an apparent visual magnitude of about +5.2 it is bright enough to be viewed with the naked eye. The measured annual parallax shift of 27.52 mas is equivalent to a distance of approximately 119 light-years (36 parsecs) from Earth.

Rober L. Millis discovered that 38 Arietis is a variable star, at Lowell Observatory, in October 1966. The discovery was announced in 1967. It was given its variable star designation, UV Arietis, in 1970.

The spectrum of this star matches a stellar classification of A7 III-IV, with the luminosity class of III-IV indicating it shows traits part way between the subgiant and giant star stages of its evolution. It is a Delta Scuti variable with a period of 0.0355 days (51 minutes) and a magnitude change of 0.040. This star is larger than the Sun, with more than double the Sun's radius and 11 times the luminosity. This energy is being radiated into outer space from the atmosphere at an effective temperature of 7,638 K, giving it the white-hued glow of an A-type star.
