= HD 19789 =

Star in the constellation Aries

Observation data Epoch J2000.0 Equinox J2000.0
- Constellation: Aries
- Right ascension: 03^{h} 11^{m} 21.91898^{s}
- Declination: +13° 02′ 52.2342″
- Apparent magnitude (V): 6.11

Characteristics
- Evolutionary stage: red giant branch
- Spectral type: K0IIIp
- B−V color index: 1.038±0.012

Astrometry
Radial velocity (R_{v})	+8.10±0.32 km/s
Proper motion (μ)	RA: −15.387 mas/yr Dec.: +16.445 mas/yr
Parallax (π)	8.4809±0.0283 mas
Distance	385 ± 1 ly (117.9 ± 0.4 pc)
Absolute magnitude (M_{V})	0.53

Details
Mass	2.6 M_{☉}
Radius	11 R_{☉}
Luminosity	63 L_{☉}
Surface gravity (log g)	2.67 cgs
Temperature	4.933 K
Age	558 Myr

Other designations
- BD+12°452, FK5 2488, HD 19789, HIP 14821, HR 952, SAO 93327, WDS WDS J03114+1303AB

Database references
SIMBAD	data

HD 19789 is a double star in the northern constellation of Aries. The primary component has an orange hue and is barely visible to the naked eye with an apparent visual magnitude of 6.11. it is located at a distance of approximately 385 light years from the Sun based on parallax, and is drifting further away with a radial velocity of +8 km/s. The star is located near the ecliptic and thus is subject to lunar occultations.

The primary, designated component A, is an aging giant star with a stellar classification of K0IIIp, where the 'p' suffix indicates some type of unspecified peculiarity in the spectrum. It has exhausted the supply of hydrogen at its core, then expanded and cooled off the main sequence: at present it has 11 times the girth of the Sun. The star is radiating 63 times the Sun's luminosity from its swollen photosphere at an effective temperature of 4,933 K. It has one reported companion, component B, at an angular separation of 0.5″ along a position angle of 23°, as of 1982.
