= HD 20644 =

Star in the constellation Aries

- Location of HD 20644 (circled in red)

Observation data Epoch J2000.0 Equinox J2000.0
- Constellation: Aries
- Right ascension: 03^{h} 20^{m} 20.36111^{s}
- Declination: +29° 02′ 54.4451″
- Apparent magnitude (V): 4.47

Characteristics
- Evolutionary stage: red giant branch
- Spectral type: K3IIIa Ba0.5
- B−V color index: 1.555±0.020

Astrometry
Radial velocity (R_{v})	−3.09±0.28 km/s
Proper motion (μ)	RA: −7.71 mas/yr Dec.: −16.91 mas/yr
Parallax (π)	6.01±0.25 mas
Distance	540 ± 20 ly (166 ± 7 pc)
Absolute magnitude (M_{V})	−1.63

Details
Mass	3.07±0.39 M_{☉}
Radius	65.70+2.66 −2.80 R_{☉}
Luminosity	1,576±199 L_{☉}
Surface gravity (log g)	2.00 cgs
Temperature	4,485±108 K
Metallicity [Fe/H]	−0.27±0.04 dex
Rotational velocity (v sin i)	1.4 km/s
Age	350±140 Myr

Other designations
- BD+28°516, FK5 2234, HD 20644, HIP 15549, HR 999, SAO 75871

Database references
SIMBAD	data

HD 20644 is a suspected binary star system in the constellation Aries. It has an orange hue and is visible to the naked eye with an apparent visual magnitude of 4.47. The system is located at a distance of approximately 540 light years from the Sun based on parallax, but is drifting closer with a radial velocity of −3 km/s.

The visible component is an aging giant star with a stellar classification of K3IIIa Ba0.5, where the suffix notation indicates this is a mild barium star. The atmosphere of this star is enriched with s-process elements that are posited to have been transferred from what is now a white dwarf companion when it evolved along the asymptotic giant branch (AGB). Alternatively, this star may itself be on the AGB. Analysis of the star gives a 74% probability that it is on the red giant branch, otherwise it would be a red clump star.

HD 20644 is about 350 million years old with three times the mass of the Sun and is spinning with a projected rotational velocity of 1.4 km/s. With the supply of hydrogen at its core exhausted, it has expanded to 66 times the Sun's radius. It is radiating 1,576 times the luminosity of the Sun from its photosphere at an effective temperature of 4,485 K.
