= HD 12661 =

Star in the constellation Aries

- Planetary orbits of the HD 12661 system

Observation data Epoch J2000 Equinox ICRS
- Constellation: Aries
- Right ascension: 02^{h} 04^{m} 34.2881^{s}
- Declination: +25° 24′ 51.514″
- Apparent magnitude (V): 7.42

Characteristics
- Evolutionary stage: subgiant
- Spectral type: G6 V
- U−B color index: +0.33
- B−V color index: +0.71

Astrometry
Proper motion (μ)	RA: −107.999±0.031 mas/yr Dec.: −173.299±0.026 mas/yr
Parallax (π)	26.4614±0.0258 mas
Distance	123.3 ± 0.1 ly (37.79 ± 0.04 pc)
Absolute magnitude (M_{V})	4.58

Details
Mass	1.07–1.10 M_{☉}
Radius	1.096–1.12 R_{☉}
Luminosity	1.22 L_{☉}
Surface gravity (log g)	4.43 cgs
Temperature	5,754 K
Metallicity [Fe/H]	0.29 ± 0.05 dex
Rotational velocity (v sin i)	1.20 km/s
Age	7.17 Gyr

Other designations
- BD+24 298, HIP 9683, SAO 75125.

Database references
SIMBAD	data

HD 12661 is a G-type main sequence star in the northern constellation of Aries. The star is slightly larger and more massive than the Sun, with an estimated age of seven billion years. It has two known extrasolar planets.

== Properties ==
The apparent visual magnitude of this star is 7.42, making it too faint to be viewed by the naked eye even under ideal viewing conditions. However, it can be readily observed using a small telescope with an aperture of 6 cm (2 in) or more. Parallax measurements of HD 12661 place it at a distance of about 123.3 light-years (37.8 parsecs) from the Earth, with a margin of error of ±0.1 light years. It has a stellar classification of G6 V, indicating that it is a main sequence star that is generating energy through the thermonuclear fusion of hydrogen at its core. The effective temperature of the star's outer envelope is about 5,754 K, giving it the characteristic yellow hue of a G-type star. Based on stellar models, estimates of the radius of this star range from 107% to 112% times Sun's radius, while the mass is likely in the range from 107% to 110% of the Sun's mass.

As a star ages it slows its rotation and diminishes the amount of magnetic activity in its chromosphere. Hence the measured emission from the chromosphere can be used to estimate the age of a star, particularly for F and G-type dwarf stars with an age of less than two billion years. However, this technique becomes less accurate for ages beyond about 5.6 billion years. Based upon the chromosphere emission of HD 12661, it is older than the Sun with an estimated age of roughly seven billion years. It has a low projected rotational velocity of 1.20 km/s, consistent with it being an older star. The age of a star can also be estimated by the abundance of lithium, as this element is destroyed through thermonuclear fusion at the core. However, this is less accurate technique. For HD 12661, the lithium abundance gives an age estimate of 4.4 billion years.

The abundance of elements other than hydrogen and helium, what astronomers term the metallicity, is unusually high in this star when compared to the Sun. High metallicity has been found to be statistically correlated with the presence of a multi-planet system around a star. It is possible that a planet in this system may have been scattered and ended up being accreted by the star, which may account for the large surface metallicity.

== Planetary system ==
The first planet was discovered in 2001 from the Lick and Keck observatories using precision measurements of the star's radial velocity variations. The periodicity in this variation allowed astronomers to extract information about the planet's orbit and minimum mass. A second planet was discovered by the same team two years later. Both planets are greater in mass than Jupiter. The inclination and true mass of planet c were measured using astrometry, and the results were published in 2025.

The system is dynamically unstable. "Either this system is being observed during a relatively rare state, or additional planets are affecting the observed radial velocities and/or the system’s secular eccentricity evolution."

The HD 12661 planetary system
Companion (in order from star)	Mass	Semimajor axis (AU)	Orbital period (years)	Eccentricity	Inclination (°)	Radius
b	>2.382±0.080 M_{J}	0.843±0.014	0.718323(68)	0.3598+0.0059 −0.0060	—	—
c	2.83+0.82 −0.67 M_{J}	2.929+0.045 −0.047	4.6535+0.0087 −0.0082	0.0131+0.0150 −0.0094	136+11 −21	—

== See also ==
- List of extrasolar planets
