= 49 Arietis =

Star in the constellation Aries

Observation data Epoch J2000 Equinox J2000
- Constellation: Aries
- Right ascension: 03^{h} 01^{m} 54.14125^{s}
- Declination: +26° 27′ 44.4746″
- Apparent magnitude (V): 5.90

Characteristics
- Evolutionary stage: main sequence
- Spectral type: kA2hA6mA7
- U−B color index: +0.12
- B−V color index: +0.141±0.006

Astrometry
Radial velocity (R_{v})	−1.0 km/s
Proper motion (μ)	RA: −14.323 mas/yr Dec.: +5.160 mas/yr
Parallax (π)	14.6587±0.0844 mas
Distance	223 ± 1 ly (68.2 ± 0.4 pc)
Absolute magnitude (M_{V})	1.87

Details
Mass	1.9 M_{☉}
Radius	2.0 R_{☉}
Luminosity	16.1 L_{☉}
Surface gravity (log g)	4.34 cgs
Temperature	8,424 K
Metallicity [Fe/H]	−0.02 dex
Rotational velocity (v sin i)	52 km/s
Age	704 Myr

Other designations
- 49 Ari, NSV 1021, BD+25°477, HD 18769, HIP 14109, HR 905, SAO 75693

Database references
SIMBAD	data

49 Arietis is a single star in the northern constellation of Aries. 49 Arietis is the Flamsteed designation. It is visible to the naked eye as a faint, white-hued star with an apparent visual magnitude of 5.90. The star is located at a distance of about 223 light-years (68 parsecs) distant from Earth based on parallax.

This object is classified as an Am star, or non-magnetic chemically peculiar star of the CP1 class, which means the spectrum displays abnormal abundances of certain heavier elements. It has a stellar classification of kA2hA6mA7, which means it has the calcium K line of an A2-class star, the hydrogen lines of an A6 star, and the metal lines of an A7 star. 49 Arietis has a moderately high rate of spin, showing a projected rotational velocity of 52 km/s, and is radiating 16 times the luminosity of the Sun from its photosphere at an effective temperature of 8,424 K.
