= HD 16955 =

Multiple star in the constellation Aries

Observation data Epoch J2000 Equinox ICRS
- Constellation: Aries
- Right ascension: 02^{h} 43^{m} 51.24421^{s}
- Declination: +25° 38′ 18.0493″
- Apparent magnitude (V): 6.376

Characteristics
- Evolutionary stage: main sequence
- Spectral type: A3 V
- B−V color index: 0.089±0.002

Astrometry
Radial velocity (R_{v})	−10.3±3.1 km/s
Proper motion (μ)	RA: −4.98±0.70 mas/yr Dec.: +6.04±0.52 mas/yr
Parallax (π)	9.59±0.76 mas
Distance	340 ± 30 ly (104 ± 8 pc)
Absolute magnitude (M_{V})	+1.18±0.13

Details

HD 16955 A
Mass	2.25±0.08 M_{☉}
Radius	2.4 R_{☉}
Luminosity	26.9+3.3 −2.9 L_{☉}
Surface gravity (log g)	3.97 cgs
Temperature	8,450±164 K
Rotational velocity (v sin i)	175 km/s
Age	1.6 Gyr

Other designations
- BD+25°441, HD 16955, HIP 12744, HR 803, SAO 75539

Database references
SIMBAD	data

HD 16955, also known as HR 803, is a double or multiple star. With an apparent visual magnitude of 6.376, is lies at or below the nominal limit for visibility with a typical naked eye. The measured annual parallax shift is 9.59 milliarcseconds, which yields an estimated distance of around 340 light years. The star is moving closer to the Sun with a heliocentric radial velocity of around -10 km/s.

This is an A-type main-sequence star with a stellar classification of A3 V. Hauck et al. (1995) identified this as a Lambda Boötis star with a circumstellar shell, but this now appears to be unlikely. It has 2.25 times the mass of the Sun and is spinning rapidly with a projected rotational velocity of 175 km/s. The star is radiating about 27 times the Sun's luminosity from its photosphere at an effective temperature of roughly 8,450 K.

HD 16955 has a magnitude 10.36 companion, component B, which is located, as of 2015, at an angular separation of 3.0 arcseconds along a position angle of 19°. This is the likely source for the detected X-ray emission with a luminosity of 262.5×10^{20} W coming from these coordinates, since A-type stars are not expected to emit X-rays. Component C is a more distant magnitude 12.94 companion located at a separation of 51.10 arcseconds along a position angle of 92°, as of 2015.
