= 62 Arietis =

Star in the constellation Aries

- Location of 62 Arietis (circled in red)

Observation data Epoch J2000 Equinox ICRS
- Constellation: Aries
- Right ascension: 03^{h} 22^{m} 11.89351^{s}
- Declination: +27° 36′ 27.1911″
- Apparent magnitude (V): 5.52

Characteristics
- Evolutionary stage: horizontal branch
- Spectral type: G5 III
- B−V color index: 1.100±0.015

Astrometry
Radial velocity (R_{v})	7.0±0.3 km/s
Proper motion (μ)	RA: +5.874 mas/yr Dec.: −14.102 mas/yr
Parallax (π)	4.7394±0.1128 mas
Distance	690 ± 20 ly (211 ± 5 pc)
Absolute magnitude (M_{V})	−1.57

Details
Mass	3.74+0.38 −0.21 M_{☉}
Radius	35.27+2.81 −3.81 R_{☉}
Luminosity	533.48 L_{☉}
Surface gravity (log g)	1.92+0.07 −0.08 cgs
Temperature	4,665+30 −31 K
Metallicity [Fe/H]	−0.17 dex
Rotational velocity (v sin i)	9.43 km/s
Age	219+38 −53 Myr

Other designations
- 62 Ari, BD+27°500, HD 20825, HIP 15696, HR 1012, SAO 75892

Database references
SIMBAD	data

62 Arietis is a single star in the northern constellation of Aries, a few degrees to the north of Tau Arietis. 62 Arietis is the Flamsteed designation. It is visible to the naked eye as a dim, yellow-hued star with an apparent visual magnitude of 5.52. Based upon an annual parallax shift of 4.7±0.1 mas, it is approximately 690 light-years (210 parsecs) distant from the Earth.

This object is an aging giant star with a stellar classification of G5 III, most likely (96% chance) on the horizontal branch. Having exhausted the supply of hydrogen at its core, the star has expanded to 35 times the Sun's radius. It is around 219 million years old with 3.7 times the mass of the Sun. The star is radiating 533 times the Sun's luminosity from its enlarged photosphere at an effective temperature of 4,665 K.

== Chinese name ==
In Chinese astronomy, 62 Arietis is called Tiān'ē (天阿), meaning Celestial Concave, because this is the only star in the Celestial Concave asterism, Hairy Head mansion (see: Chinese constellation). (Note: Stellarium, citing Yi Shitong (1981)) Ian Ridpath instead translates this name as "celestial river" and identifies it as HR 999. R. H. Allen's Star Names (1899) rendered this name as Teen Ho, but described it as an asterism of four stars in Aries.
