= 29 Arietis =

Star in the constellation Aries

Observation data Epoch J2000.0 Equinox J2000.0 (ICRS)
- Constellation: Aries
- Right ascension: 02^{h} 32^{m} 54.14202^{s}
- Declination: +15° 02′ 04.3103″
- Apparent magnitude (V): 6.00

Characteristics
- Spectral type: F7 V + G5 V + ?
- B−V color index: 0.572±0.006

Astrometry
Radial velocity (R_{v})	9.1±2.5 km/s
Proper motion (μ)	RA: −20.557 mas/yr Dec.: +50.206 mas/yr
Parallax (π)	34.8568±0.1313 mas
Distance	93.6 ± 0.4 ly (28.7 ± 0.1 pc)
Absolute magnitude (M_{V})	4.2/5.0

Orbit
Period (P)	19.4161±0.0005 d
Eccentricity (e)	0.4096±0.0033
Longitude of the node (Ω)	179.09±0.44°
Periastron epoch (T)	2,454,101.914±0.018 JD
Semi-amplitude (K_{1}) (primary)	23.36±0.09 km/s

Details

29 Ari A
Mass	1.14 M_{☉}
Radius	1.59+0.07 −0.05 R_{☉}
Luminosity	3.27 L_{☉}
Surface gravity (log g)	4.12 cgs
Temperature	6,063±114 K
Metallicity [Fe/H]	0.09 dex
Age	3.0±1.8 Gyr

29 Ari B
Mass	0.88 M_{☉}
Temperature	5,270±170 K

Other designations
- 29 Ari, BD+14°419, FK5 2176, GJ 3161, HD 15814, HIP 11843, HR 741, SAO 92998, WDS J02329+1502

Database references
SIMBAD	data

29 Arietis is a triple star system in the northern constellation of Aries. 29 Arietis is the Flamsteed designation. Its annual parallax shift of 34.86±0.13 mas indicates a distance of about 94 light-years (29 parsecs) from Earth. The system is barely visible to the naked eye with an apparent visual magnitude of 6.0; it is 0.02 degree north of the ecliptic. It is moving further from Earth with a heliocentric radial velocity of 9 km/s.

The core of the system is formed by a close spectroscopic binary with an angular separation of 3.892 mas, a semimajor axis of 0.15692±0.00086 AU, an orbital period of 19.4 days, and an eccentricity of 0.4. The larger member of this pair has 114% of the mass of the Sun, while its companion has 88% of the Sun's mass. Orbiting the pair at an angular separation of 1.422 arcseconds over a period of 164 years, the tertiary component has 52% of the Sun's mass.
