= 66 Arietis =

Star in the constellation Aries

Observation data Epoch J2000 Equinox ICRS
- Constellation: Aries
- Right ascension: 03^{h} 28^{m} 26.56757^{s}
- Declination: +22° 48′ 14.4335″
- Apparent magnitude (V): 6.03 (6.2/10.4)

Characteristics
- Evolutionary stage: red giant branch
- Spectral type: K0 IV
- B−V color index: 0.964

Astrometry
Radial velocity (R_{v})	+48.99±0.16 km/s
Proper motion (μ)	RA: +0.833 mas/yr Dec.: −110.194 mas/yr
Parallax (π)	14.1629±0.0361 mas
Distance	230.3 ± 0.6 ly (70.6 ± 0.2 pc)

Details

66 Ari A
Mass	1.14 M_{☉}
Radius	6.87 R_{☉}
Luminosity	22.5 L_{☉}
Surface gravity (log g)	3.00 cgs
Temperature	4,804 K
Metallicity [Fe/H]	−0.29 dex
Rotational velocity (v sin i)	1.6 km/s
Age	6.1 Gyr

Other designations
- BD+22°495, HD 21467, HIP 16181, HR 1048, SAO 75945, WDS J03284+2248

Database references
SIMBAD	data

66 Arietis (abbreviated 66 Ari) is a double star in the northern constellation of Aries. 66 Arietis is the Flamsteed designation. It has an apparent visual magnitude of 6.03, putting it near the limit for naked eye visibility. The magnitude 10.4 companion is located at an angular separation of 0.810 arcseconds from the primary along a position angle of 65°. The distance to this pair, as determined from parallax measurements made during the Gaia satellite mission, is approximately 230 light-years (71 parsecs).

The spectrum of the primary component matches a stellar classification of K0 IV, with the luminosity class of IV indicating this is a subgiant star. It has 6.9 times the radius of the Sun and shines with 22.5 times the Sun's energy. This energy is radiated from the outer atmosphere at an effective temperature of 4,804 K giving it the cool orange-hued glow of a K-type star.
