= 65 Arietis =

Star in the constellation Aries

Observation data Epoch J2000 Equinox ICRS
- Constellation: Aries
- Right ascension: 03^{h} 24^{m} 26.11530^{s}
- Declination: +20° 48′ 12.5626″
- Apparent magnitude (V): 6.07

Characteristics
- Evolutionary stage: main sequence
- Spectral type: A1 V
- B−V color index: −0.028±0.006

Astrometry
Radial velocity (R_{v})	−6.2±2.3 km/s
Proper motion (μ)	RA: +0.28 mas/yr Dec.: −10.35 mas/yr
Parallax (π)	9.4511±0.0940 mas
Distance	345 ± 3 ly (106 ± 1 pc)
Absolute magnitude (M_{V})	1.17

Details
Mass	2.66 M_{☉}
Radius	2.13 R_{☉}
Luminosity	46.7 L_{☉}
Surface gravity (log g)	4.20 cgs
Temperature	10,332 K
Rotation	0.964 days
Rotational velocity (v sin i)	27 km/s
Age	271 Myr

Other designations
- 65 Ari, BD+20°556, HD 21050, HIP 15870, HR 1027, SAO 75915

Database references
SIMBAD	data

65 Arietis is a star in the northern constellation of Aries, located near Tau Arietis. 65 Arietis, abbreviated '65 Ari', is the Flamsteed designation. It has an apparent visual magnitude of 6.07, which, according to the Bortle Dark-Sky Scale, means it is faintly visible to the naked eye when viewed from dark suburban skies. Based upon an annual parallax shift of 9.45±0.09 mas, it is approximately 345 light-years (106 parsecs) distant from the Sun. The star is moving closer to the Earth with a heliocentric radial velocity of around −6 km/s.

This is an ordinary A-type main sequence star with a stellar classification of A1 V. It has about 2.1 times the mass of the Sun and shines with 47 times the Sun's luminosity. This energy is being radiated into outer space at an effective temperature of 10,332 K, giving it the white-hued glow of an A-type star. It is roughly 23% of the way through its lifetime on the main sequence of core hydrogen burning stars.
