= 16 Arietis =

Star in the constellation Aries

Observation data Epoch J2000.0 Equinox ICRS
- Constellation: Aries
- Right ascension: 02^{h} 11^{m} 12.055^{s}
- Declination: +25° 56′ 12.99″
- Apparent magnitude (V): 6.01

Characteristics
- Evolutionary stage: red giant branch
- Spectral type: K3 III
- B−V color index: 1.365±0.006
- Variable type: Constant

Astrometry
Radial velocity (R_{v})	−15.74±0.20 km/s
Proper motion (μ)	RA: −8.211 mas/yr Dec.: −4.866 mas/yr
Parallax (π)	6.394±0.0528 mas
Distance	510 ± 4 ly (156 ± 1 pc)
Absolute magnitude (M_{V})	−0.82

Details
Radius	27.5±0.6 R_{☉}
Luminosity	233±4 L_{☉}
Surface gravity (log g)	1.88±0.03 cgs
Temperature	4,275±9 K

Other designations
- BD+25 362, GC 2609, HD 13363, HIP 10203, HR 633, SAO 75188

Database references
SIMBAD	data

16 Arietis is a star in the northern constellation of Aries. 16 Arietis is the Flamsteed designation, abbreviated 16 Ari. Its apparent magnitude is 6.01. Based upon the annual parallax shift of 6.39±0.05 mas, this star is approximately 510 ly distant from Earth. The brightness of this star is diminished by 0.40 in magnitude from extinction caused by interstellar gas and dust. This is an evolved giant star with a stellar classification of K3 III.
