= HIP 14810 b =

Extrasolar planet in the constellation Aries

Discovery
- Discovered by: J.T. Wright et al. N2K planet search
- Discovery date: first discovered in 2006 published in 2007
- Detection method: Radial velocity

Orbital characteristics
- Semi-major axis: 0.0696±0.0044 AU
- Eccentricity: 0.14399±0.00087
- Orbital period (sidereal): 6.673892±0.000008 d
- Time of periastron: 2,463,694.5879±0.0067
- Argument of periastron: 158.83±0.38
- Semi-amplitude: 423.34±0.4
- Star: HIP 14810

HIP 14810 b is a massive hot Jupiter approximately 165 light-years away in the constellation of Aries. It has mass 3.88 times that of Jupiter and orbits at 0.0692 AU. It was discovered by the N2K Consortium in 2006 and the discovery paper was published in 2007. Prior to this a preliminary orbit had been published in the Catalog of Nearby Exoplanets.
