= HIP 14810 c =

Extrasolar planet in the constellation Aries

Discovery
- Discovered by: J.T. Wright et al.
- Discovery date: first discovered in 2006 published in 2007
- Detection method: Radial velocity

Orbital characteristics
- Semi-major axis: 0.549±0.034 AU
- Eccentricity: 0.1566±0.0099
- Orbital period (sidereal): 147.747±0.029 d
- Time of periastron: 2463786.4±1.2
- Argument of periastron: 331.1±2.6
- Semi-amplitude: 50.91±0.45
- Star: HIP 14810

HIP 14810 c is an extrasolar planet approximately 165 light-years away in the constellation of Aries. This planet has mass at least 1.28 times that of Jupiter and orbits at 0.545 AU in an eccentric orbit. The planet was discovered by the N2K Consortium in 2006 and announced in a paper published in 2007. With the discovery of a third planet in the system which was announced in 2009, the parameters of this planet were revised.
