= 54 Arietis =

Star in the constellation Aries

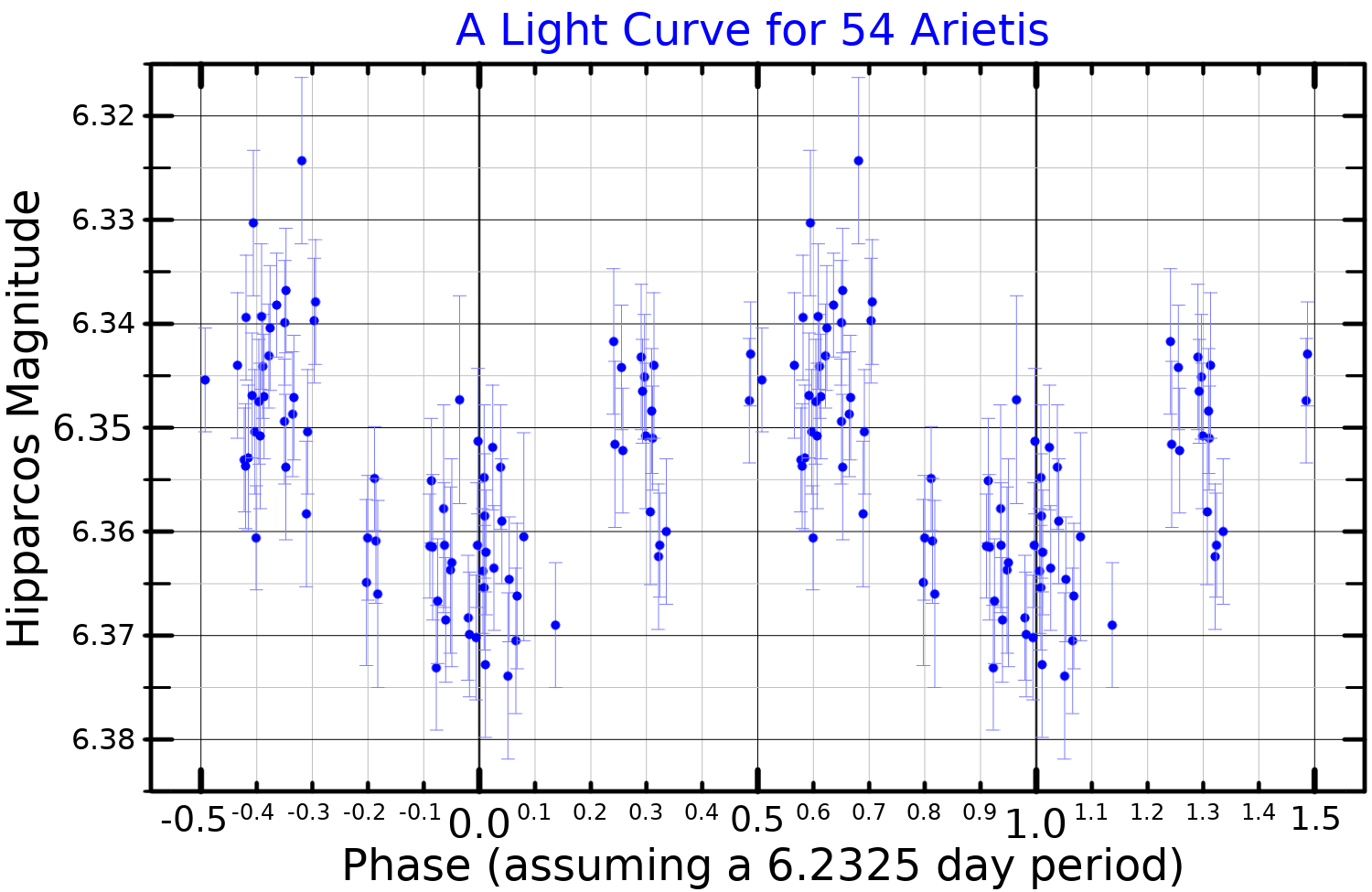
- A light curve for 54 Arietis, plotted from Hipparcos data

Observation data Epoch J2000 Equinox ICRS
- Constellation: Aries
- Right ascension: 03^{h} 08^{m} 21.10890^{s}
- Declination: +18° 47′ 42.1886″
- Apparent magnitude (V): 6.27

Characteristics
- Evolutionary stage: AGB
- Spectral type: M0 III
- B−V color index: 1.560±0.014

Astrometry
Radial velocity (R_{v})	+44.32±0.22 km/s
Proper motion (μ)	RA: +38.133 mas/yr Dec.: −14.295 mas/yr
Parallax (π)	4.3947±0.1037 mas
Distance	740 ± 20 ly (228 ± 5 pc)
Absolute magnitude (M_{V})	−0.54

Details
Radius	40.7+3.0 −2.6 R_{☉}
Luminosity	387±11 L_{☉}
Temperature	4013+137 −141 K

Other designations
- 54 Ari, BD+18°414, FK5 4285, GC 3742, HD 19460, HIP 14586, HR 940, SAO 93293

Database references
SIMBAD	data

54 Arietis is a star in the northern zodiac constellation of Aries. 54 Arietis is the Flamsteed designation. It is a challenge to view with the naked eye even under good viewing conditions, having an apparent visual magnitude of 6.27. Based upon an annual parallax shift of 4.39 mas, it is located approximately 740 light-years (230 parsecs) distant from Earth, and it is drifting further away with a radial velocity of +44 km/s. The brightness of the star is diminished by 0.15 in magnitude from extinction caused by interstellar gas and dust. The star is positioned near the ecliptic and thus is subject to lunar occultations.

This is an aging red giant star with a stellar classification of M0 III that is currently evolving along the asymptotic giant branch. Having exhausted the supply of hydrogen at its core, the star has expanded to 41 times the Sun's radius. It varies slightly in brightness, with a periodicity of 6.2 days and an amplitude change of 0.0096 in magnitude. On average it is radiating 387 times the luminosity of the Sun from its enlarged photosphere at an effective temperature of 4,013 K.
