= 26 Arietis =

Star in the constellation Aries

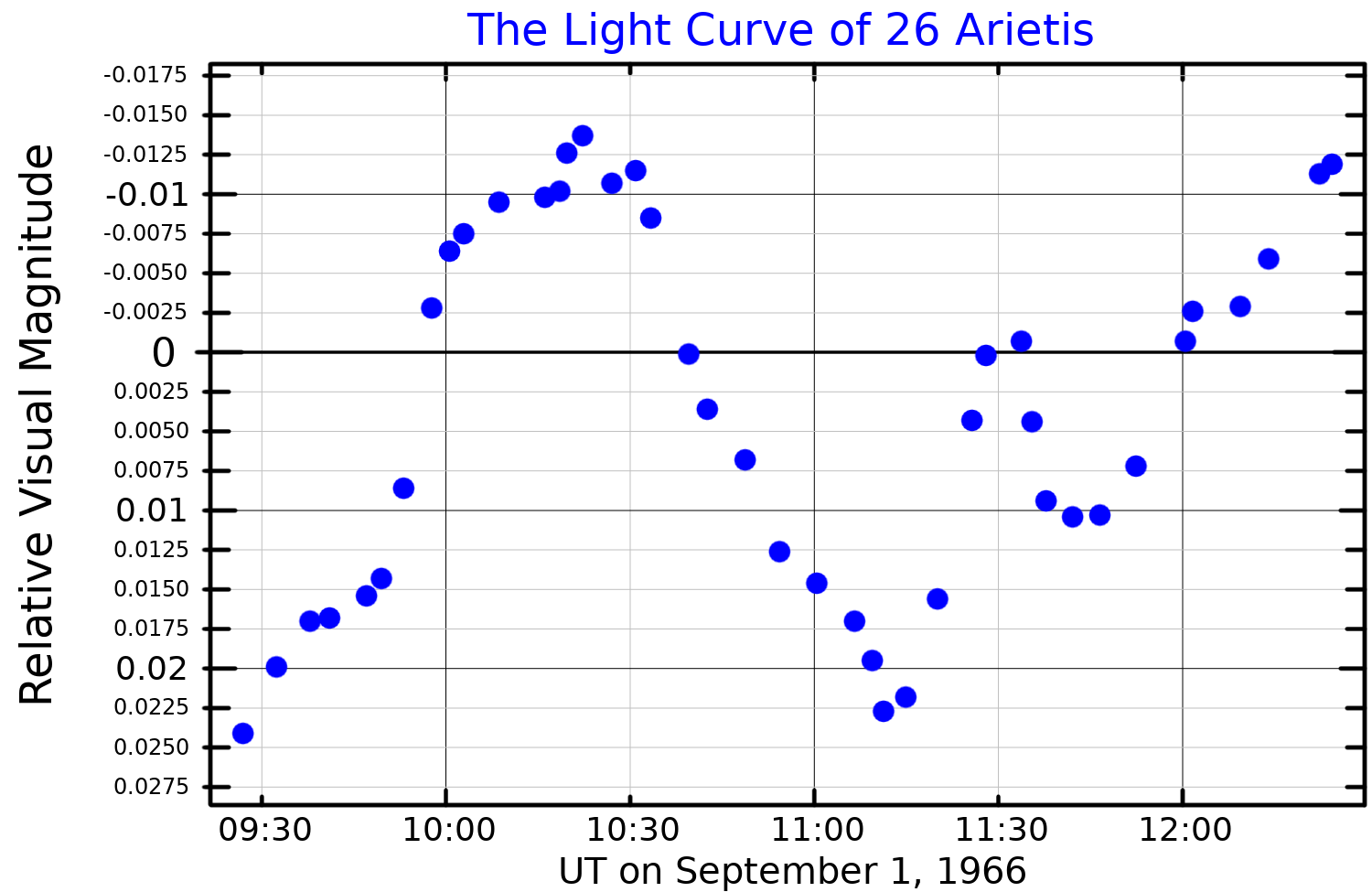
- A visual band light curve for 26 Arietis, adapted from Breger (1969)

Observation data Epoch J2000 Equinox ICRS
- Constellation: Aries
- Right ascension: 02^{h} 30^{m} 38.41713^{s}
- Declination: +19° 51′ 19.0921″
- Apparent magnitude (V): 6.10 - 6.15

Characteristics
- Evolutionary stage: main sequence
- Spectral type: A9 V
- U−B color index: +0.102
- B−V color index: +0.248
- Variable type: Delta Scuti variable

Astrometry
Radial velocity (R_{v})	+15.0 km/s
Proper motion (μ)	RA: +79.920 mas/yr Dec.: −34.779 mas/yr
Parallax (π)	14.0324±0.0822 mas
Distance	232 ± 1 ly (71.3 ± 0.4 pc)
Absolute magnitude (M_{V})	1.89

Details
Mass	1.74 M_{☉}
Radius	2.32+0.11 −0.12 R_{☉}
Luminosity	15 L_{☉}
Surface gravity (log g)	3.84 cgs
Temperature	7,430 K
Rotational velocity (v sin i)	186 km/s
Age	1.075 Gyr

Other designations
- 26 Ari, UU Arietis, BD+19°365, FK5 2172, HD 15550, HIP 11678, HR 729, SAO 92979

Database references
SIMBAD	data

26 Arietis is a variable star in the northern constellation of Aries. 26 Arietis is the Flamsteed designation; it also bears the variable star designation UU Arietis. The apparent visual magnitude of this star is 6.14, which, according to the Bortle Dark-Sky Scale, is within the naked eye visibility limit in dark rural skies. The annual parallax shift of 14.03 mas is equivalent to a distance of approximately 232 light-years (71 parsecs) from Earth. The star is receding from the Earth with a heliocentric radial velocity of +15 km/s.

Michel Breger discovered that 36 Arietis is a variable star in 1969. It was given its variable star designation in 1970. It is a Delta Scuti variable with a variability period of 0.0676 days and an amplitude of 0.010 in magnitude. It is an A-type main sequence star with a stellar classification of A9 V. The star is around a billion years old with 1.74 times the mass of the Sun and 2.32 times the Sun's radius. The star is radiating 15 times the luminosity of the Sun from its photosphere at an effective temperature of 7,430 K.
