= Kappa Arietis =

Binary star system in the constellation Aries

- Location of κ Arietis (circled)

Observation data Epoch J2000.0 Equinox ICRS
- Constellation: Aries
- Right ascension: 02^{h} 06^{m} 33.92497^{s}
- Declination: +22° 38′ 53.9476″
- Apparent magnitude (V): 5.02

Characteristics
- Spectral type: A2m
- U−B color index: +0.11
- B−V color index: +0.12

Astrometry
Radial velocity (R_{v})	+11.5 km/s
Proper motion (μ)	RA: +20.348 mas/yr Dec.: −35.671 mas/yr
Parallax (π)	18.0292±0.3092 mas
Distance	181 ± 3 ly (55.5 ± 1.0 pc)
Absolute magnitude (M_{V})	1.30

Orbit
Period (P)	15.2938 d
Eccentricity (e)	0.61
Periastron epoch (T)	2,421,844.121 JD
Argument of periastron (ω) (secondary)	358.3°
Semi-amplitude (K_{1}) (primary)	34.5 km/s
Semi-amplitude (K_{2}) (secondary)	35.4 km/s

Details
Mass	2.09±0.31 M_{☉}
Radius	2.32±0.08 R_{☉}
Luminosity	24.4±1.3 L_{☉}
Surface gravity (log g)	4.03±0.07 cgs
Temperature	8,421±125 K
Metallicity [Fe/H]	+0.18 dex
Rotational velocity (v sin i)	18 km/s

Other designations
- κ Ari, 12 Arietis, BD+21°279, GC 2527, HD 12869, HIP 9836, HR 613, SAO 75146, PM 91364

Database references
SIMBAD	data

Kappa Arietis is a binary star system in the northern constellation of Aries. Its name is a Bayer designation that is Latinized from κ Arietis, and abbreviated Kappa Ari or κ Ari. The combined apparent visual magnitude of the pair is 5.02, making the system bright enough for it to be dimly visible to the naked eye as a white-hued point of light. It is located approximately 181 light-years from the Sun based on parallax, and is drifting further away with a radial velocity of +11.5 km/s.

The binary nature of this system was announced in 1918 by Lick Observatory. It is a double-lined spectroscopic binary with an orbital period of 15.3 days and an eccentricity of 0.61. Both components displaying the spectral properties of an Am, or metallic-lined star. They have nearly the same brightness and their mass ratio is 1.03; very close to equal.
