= 11 Arietis =

Star in the Aries constellation

Observation data Epoch J2000 Equinox J2000
- Constellation: Aries
- Right ascension: 02^{h} 06^{m} 49.23558^{s}
- Declination: +25° 42′ 16.3939″
- Apparent magnitude (V): 6.01

Characteristics
- Spectral type: B9 IV-Vn
- U−B color index: −0.26
- B−V color index: −0.04

Astrometry
Radial velocity (R_{v})	−9 km/s
Proper motion (μ)	RA: +19.46 mas/yr Dec.: −14.31 mas/yr
Parallax (π)	3.72±0.38 mas
Distance	approx. 880 ly (approx. 270 pc)

Details
Radius	2.8 R_{☉}
Rotational velocity (v sin i)	249 km/s

Other designations
- BD+25°349, HD 12885, HIP 9859, HR 615, SAO 75149.

Database references
SIMBAD	data

11 Arietis (abbreviated 11 Ari) is a star in the northern constellation of Aries. 11 Arietis is the Flamsteed designation. It has an apparent visual magnitude of 6.01, which makes it a challenging target to view with the naked eye in suitably dark skies. Based upon an annual parallax shift of 3.72 mas, the distance to this star is approximately 880 light-years (270 parsecs).

11 Arietis has a stellar classification of B9 IV-Vn, which may indicate that it is beginning to evolve away from the main sequence into a subgiant as the supply of hydrogen at its core becomes exhausted. At present, it has an estimated radius of 2.8 times that of the Sun, but this will increase as it continues to evolve into a giant star. 11 Arietis is spinning rapidly with a projected rotational velocity of 249 km/s. This motion, combined with the Doppler effect, is causing the absorption lines in the spectrum to spread out and become 'nebulous', as indicated by the 'n' suffix in the classification.
