= 31 Arietis =

Binary star system in the constellation Aries

Observation data Epoch J2000 Equinox ICRS
- Constellation: Aries
- Right ascension: 02^{h} 36^{m} 37.919^{s}
- Declination: +12° 26′ 51.474″
- Apparent magnitude (V): 5.75 (5.68 + 5.78)

Characteristics
- Spectral type: F7 V + F7 V
- U−B color index: –0.05
- B−V color index: +0.47

Astrometry
Radial velocity (R_{v})	+8.36±0.44 km/s
Proper motion (μ)	RA: +279.471 mas/yr Dec.: −85.654 mas/yr
Parallax (π)	28.9026±0.2217 mas
Distance	112.8 ± 0.9 ly (34.6 ± 0.3 pc)
Absolute magnitude (M_{V})	2.94

Orbit
Period (P)	3.80 ± 0.10 yr
Semi-major axis (a)	0.077 ± 0.001″
Eccentricity (e)	0.017 ± 0.002
Inclination (i)	112.7 ± 0.5°
Longitude of the node (Ω)	145.0 ± 0.5°
Periastron epoch (T)	2010.28 ± 0.15
Argument of periastron (ω) (secondary)	3.7 ± 15.0°

Details
Temperature	6,137 K
Metallicity [Fe/H]	–0.25 dex
Rotational velocity (v sin i)	5 km/s
Age	2.8 Gyr

Other designations
- BD+11 360, FK5 2179, HD 16234, HIP 12153, HR 763, SAO 93022, WDS J02366+1227

Database references
SIMBAD	data

31 Arietis is a binary star system in the northern constellation of Aries. 31 Arietis is the Flamsteed designation, which is abbreviated 31 Ari. The pair have an apparent visual magnitude of 5.75, which is just bright enough to be faintly visible to the naked eye. Based upon an annual parallax shift of 28.90 mas, the distance to this system is 112.8 light-years (34.6 parsecs). It is drifting further away with a line of sight velocity component of +8.4 km/s. The system is located near the ecliptic, so it is subject to occultation by the Moon.

The two members of this system orbit each other with a period of 3.80 years and an eccentricity of 0.017. Both components of the system are F-type main sequence stars with a stellar classification of F7 V. The dynamical mass of the system is 3.36 ± 0.04 M_{☉}. Their estimated age is 2.8 billion years.
