= Eta Arietis =

Star in the constellation Aries

η Arietis
- Location of η Arietis (circled)

Observation data Epoch J2000 Equinox ICRS
- Constellation: Aries
- Right ascension: 02^{h} 12^{m} 48.086^{s}
- Declination: +21° 12′ 39.58″
- Apparent magnitude (V): 5.227±0.023

Characteristics
- Spectral type: F5 V
- B−V color index: +0.435

Astrometry
Radial velocity (R_{v})	+5.38±0.19 km/s
Proper motion (μ)	RA: +163.917 mas/yr Dec.: +5.000 mas/yr
Parallax (π)	33.3383±0.1196 mas
Distance	97.8 ± 0.4 ly (30.0 ± 0.1 pc)
Absolute magnitude (M_{V})	+2.93

Details
Mass	1.30±0.19 M_{☉}
Radius	1.95±0.08 R_{☉}
Luminosity	5.91±0.23 L_{☉}
Surface gravity (log g)	3.97±0.08 cgs
Temperature	6,443±107 K
Metallicity [Fe/H]	–0.35 dex
Rotational velocity (v sin i)	9 km/s
Age	2.6 Gyr; 3.98 Gyr

Other designations
- Zuogeng, η Ari, 17 Arietis, BD+20 348, GC 2643, GJ 1043, HD 13555, HIP 10306, HR 646, SAO 75204, PPM 91445, TIC 306484795

Database references
SIMBAD	data

Eta Arietis, also named Zuogeng, is a star in the northern constellation of Aries. Its Bayer designation is Latinized from η Arietis, and abbreviated Eta Ari or η Ari. This star is dimly visible to the naked eye with an apparent visual magnitude of 5.231. Based on an annual parallax shift of 33.34 mas, the distance to this star is 98 light-years (30 pc). It is drifting further away from the Sun with a radial velocity of +5 km/s.

This is an ordinary F-type main-sequence star with a stellar classification of F5 V. It is younger than the Sun with an age of about 2.6 billion years, and is spinning with a projected rotational velocity of 9 km/s. This star has 1.3 times the mass of the Sun and double the Sun's radius. It is radiating 5.9 times the luminosity of the Sun from its photosphere at an effective temperature of the outer atmosphere is 6,443 K, giving it the yellow-white-hued glow of an F-type star. The abundance of elements more massive than helium in the stellar atmosphere is lower than in the Sun.

Eta Arietis was examined using the HARPS instrument for radial velocity variations that may be caused by an orbiting companion, but no signal was detected. Nor has an infrared excess been detected using the Spitzer Space Telescope, which might otherwise indicate the presence of circumstellar gas or dust.

In Chinese astronomy, this star is part of the asterism Zuǒ Gēng (左更, Official in Charge of the Forest). The IAU Working Group on Star Names adopted the name Zuogeng for this star on 15 October 2026.
