= 20 Arietis =

Star in the constellation Aries

Observation data Epoch J2000 Equinox J2000
- Constellation: Aries
- Right ascension: 02^{h} 15^{m} 46.04974^{s}
- Declination: +25° 46′ 58.5781″
- Apparent magnitude (V): 5.79

Characteristics
- Evolutionary stage: main sequence
- Spectral type: F6 III-IV or F6 IV-V
- B−V color index: 0.439±0.005

Astrometry
Radial velocity (R_{v})	+25.1±0.3 km/s
Proper motion (μ)	RA: +176.818 mas/yr Dec.: −65.175 mas/yr
Parallax (π)	24.3520±0.0328 mas
Distance	133.9 ± 0.2 ly (41.06 ± 0.06 pc)
Absolute magnitude (M_{V})	2.67

Details
Mass	1.49±0.10 M_{☉}
Radius	1.94±0.24 R_{☉}
Luminosity	6.6±0.3 L_{☉}
Surface gravity (log g)	4.03±0.05 cgs
Temperature	6,416±60 K
Metallicity [Fe/H]	0.27±0.05 dex
Rotational velocity (v sin i)	8.0 km/s
Age	2.19+0.44 −0.37 Gyr

Other designations
- 20 Ari, BD+25°373, GC 2707, HD 13871, HIP 10540, HR 656, SAO 75239

Database references
SIMBAD	data

20 Arietis is a single star in the northern constellation of Aries. 20 Arietis is the Flamsteed designation. It has an apparent visual magnitude of 5.79, which is bright enough to be just faintly visible to the naked eye as a yellow-white hued star. The star is located 134 light years away from the Sun based upon parallax. It has a relatively high proper motion, traversing the celestial sphere at the rate of 0.188 arc seconds per annum. 20 Arietis is receding from the Earth with a heliocentric radial velocity of +25 km/s.

Gray et al. (2001) gave the stellar classification of 20 Arietis as F6 III-IV, matching an F-type star with spectral traits intermediate between a giant and a subgiant star. Harlan (1969) had found a less-evolved class of F6 IV-V. The star is around two billion years old with an estimated 1.5 times the mass of the Sun and two times the Sun's radius. It is spinning with a projected rotational velocity of 8.0 km/s and has a higher than solar metallicity. The star is radiating 6.6 times the luminosity of the Sun from its photosphere at an effective temperature of around 6,416 K.
