= 10 Arietis =

Binary star in the constellation Aries

Observation data Epoch J2000.0 Equinox J2000.0 (ICRS)
- Constellation: Aries
- Right ascension: 02^{h} 03^{m} 39.34547^{s}
- Declination: +25° 56′ 07.7129″
- Apparent magnitude (V): 5.63

Characteristics
- Spectral type: F8 IV + F9 V

Astrometry
Radial velocity (R_{v})	+12.9 km/s
Proper motion (μ)	RA: +128.01 mas/yr Dec.: +11.19 mas/yr
Parallax (π)	20.53±0.67 mas
Distance	159 ± 5 ly (49 ± 2 pc)
Absolute magnitude (M_{V})	2.21

Orbit
Period (P)	325 yr
Semi-major axis (a)	1.39″
Eccentricity (e)	0.59
Inclination (i)	51°
Longitude of the node (Ω)	20.5°
Periastron epoch (T)	B1931.6
Argument of periastron (ω) (secondary)	165°

Details
Metallicity [Fe/H]	–0.10 dex
Age	1.9 Gyr

Other designations
- 10 Ari, BD+25°341, HD 12558, HIP 9621, HR 605, SAO 75114, ADS 1631, WDS 02037+2556AB

Database references
SIMBAD	data

10 Arietis is a binary star system in the northern constellation of Aries. 10 Arietis is the Flamsteed designation. It is visible to the naked eye as a dim, yellow-white hued star with a combined apparent visual magnitude of 5.63. Based upon parallax measurements, it is located around 159 light years away from the Sun. The system is receding from the Earth with a heliocentric radial velocity of +12.9 km/s.

The pair orbit each other with a period of approximately 325 years and an eccentricity of 0.59. The semimajor axis of the orbit has an angular size of 1.39″. The magnitude 5.92 primary, designated component A, is an aging F-type subgiant star with a stellar classification of F8 IV. The secondary star, component B, is a magnitude 7.95 F-type main-sequence star with a stellar classification of F9 V. There is a magnitude 13.5 visual companion, designated component C, at an angular separation of 95.30″ along a position angle of 150°, as of 2001.
