= 52 Arietis =

Triple star system in the constellation Aries

Observation data Epoch J2000 Equinox ICRS
- Constellation: Aries
- Right ascension: 03^{h} 05^{m} 26.68819^{s}
- Declination: +25° 15′ 18.6257″
- Apparent magnitude (V): 5.46

Characteristics
- Spectral type: B7 V + B7 V
- U−B color index: −0.38
- B−V color index: −0.03

Astrometry
Radial velocity (R_{v})	9 km/s
Proper motion (μ)	RA: +1.44 mas/yr Dec.: −10.26 mas/yr
Parallax (π)	6.05±1.06 mas
Distance	approx. 540 ly (approx. 170 pc)

Orbit
Primary	52 Ari A
Name	52 Ari B
Period (P)	227 yr
Semi-major axis (a)	0.47″
Eccentricity (e)	0.73
Inclination (i)	77.5°
Longitude of the node (Ω)	92.8°
Periastron epoch (T)	1938.5

Details

52 Ari A
Mass	5.12 M_{☉}
Radius	3.3 R_{☉}
Luminosity	452 L_{☉}
Temperature	12,912 K
Rotational velocity (v sin i)	159 km/s

52 Ari B
Mass	5.12 M_{☉}

Other designations
- 52 Arietis, ADS 2336, BD+24°431, HIP 14376.
- 52 Ari A: HD 19134, HR 927.
- 52 Ari B: HD 19135, HR 928.

Database references
SIMBAD	52 Ari
- 52 Ari A
- 52 Ari B

52 Arietis (abbreviated 52 Ari) is a triple star system in the northern constellation of Aries. 52 Arietis is the Flamsteed designation. The combined apparent magnitude is +5.46, which is bright enough to be faintly visible to the naked eye. Based upon an annual parallax shift of 6.05 mas, the system is roughly 540 light-years (170 parsecs) distant from the Earth. The inner pair of this system consist of two nearly identical B-type main sequence stars, each with about five times the mass of the Sun. The tertiary component is a smaller star with 88% of the Sun's mass, and is a common proper motion companion.
