= Rho2 Arietis =

Star in the constellation Aries

ρ^{2} Arietis
- Location of ρ^{2} Arietis (circled)

Observation data Epoch J2000.0 Equinox J2000.0 (ICRS)
- Constellation: Aries
- Right ascension: 02^{h} 55^{m} 48.49800^{s}
- Declination: +18° 19′ 53.9029″
- Apparent magnitude (V): 5.45–6.01

Characteristics
- Evolutionary stage: AGB
- Spectral type: M6 III
- U−B color index: +1.12
- B−V color index: +1.51
- R−I color index: +2.17
- Variable type: SRb

Astrometry
Radial velocity (R_{v})	+46.0 km/s
Proper motion (μ)	RA: −7.78 mas/yr Dec.: −14.98 mas/yr
Parallax (π)	9.28±0.30 mas
Distance	350 ± 10 ly (108 ± 3 pc)
Absolute magnitude (M_{V})	+0.60

Details
Mass	1.21 M_{☉}
Radius	107.9±6.2 R_{☉}
Luminosity	1,390 L_{☉}
Surface gravity (log g)	0.5 cgs
Temperature	3,400 K
Metallicity [Fe/H]	–0.25 dex
Rotation	<909 days
Rotational velocity (v sin i)	6.0±0.5 km/s

Other designations
- ρ^{2} Ari, 45 Arietis, RZ Arietis, BD+17 457, GC 3517, HD 18191, HIP 13654, HR 867, SAO 93189, PPM 118672

Database references
SIMBAD	data

Rho^{2} Arietis is an M-type red giant star in the northern constellation of Aries. Its name is a Bayer designation that is Latinized from ρ^{2} Arietis, and abbreviated Rho^{2} Ari or ρ^{2} Ari. The brightness of this star varies from magnitude 5.45 to 6.01, making it faintly visible to the naked eye under good observing conditions. With an annual parallax shift of 9.28 mas, it is approximately 350 light-years (110 parsecs) distant from the Earth. It is drifting further away from the Sun with a radial velocity of +46 km/s.

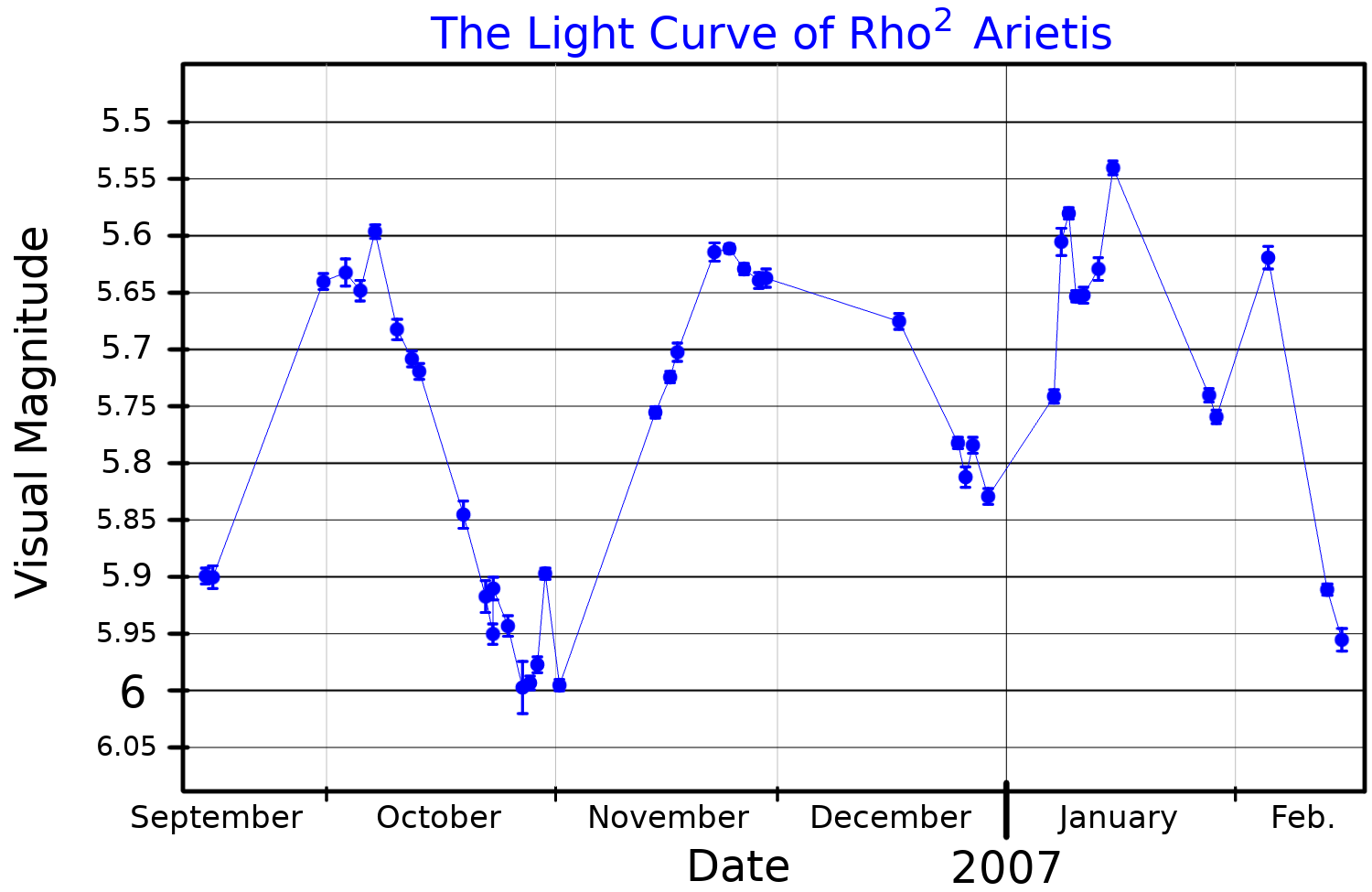
A visual band light curve for Rho^{2} Arietis, plotted from data presented in Tabur et al. (2009)

Rho^{2} Arietis is classified as a semiregular variable star with periods of 49.9 and 54.8 days. It has the variable star designation, RZ Arietis.

This is a red giant star with a stellar classification of M6 III; it is probably on the asymptotic giant branch, having exhausted its core helium. It is predicted to have started its life with 1.5 times the mass of the Sun, and is now down to 1.2 times the Sun's mass. At its current evolutionary stage Rho^{2} Arietis has expanded to 108 times the Sun's radius. It is radiating 1,390 times the Sun's luminosity from its photosphere at an effective temperature of 3,400 K.

This star possesses a strong magnetic field, one of the strongest for M-type giants. It also possesses a high lithium abundance, higher than expected from evolutionary models. The strong magnetic field, rapid rotation and unusual lithium abundance suggest this star may have engulfed a planet when it was on the red-giant branch.
