= 40 Arietis =

Binary star in the constellation Aries

Observation data Epoch J2000 Equinox ICRS
- Constellation: Aries
- Right ascension: 02^{h} 48^{m} 32.08864^{s}
- Declination: +18° 17′ 01.6491″
- Apparent magnitude (V): 5.82

Characteristics
- Spectral type: K1 III
- U−B color index: 1.13
- B−V color index: +1.20
- R−I color index: 0.44
- Variable type: suspected

Astrometry
Radial velocity (R_{v})	+47.1 km/s
Proper motion (μ)	RA: +41.250 mas/yr Dec.: −32.585 mas/yr
Parallax (π)	7.3266±0.1215 mas
Distance	445 ± 7 ly (136 ± 2 pc)
Absolute magnitude (M_{V})	0.09

Details
Mass	1.60±0.48 M_{☉}
Radius	19.74+0.29 −0.96 R_{☉}
Luminosity	127.98±2.52 L_{☉}
Surface gravity (log g)	2.09±0.11 cgs
Temperature	4,473±92 K
Metallicity [Fe/H]	−0.21±0.05 dex
Age	2.63+1.00 −0.72 Gyr

Other designations
- 40 Ari, NSV 937, AAVSO 0242+17C, BD+17°442, GC 3369, HD 17459, HIP 13108, HR 828, SAO 93118

Database references
SIMBAD	data

40 Arietis is a probable binary star system in the northern constellation of Aries. 40 Arietis is the Flamsteed designation. Their combined apparent magnitude is 5.82, putting the system near the limit of naked eye visibility. Based upon an annual parallax shift of just 7.33 mas, it is 445 light-years (136 parsecs) away from the Sun. At that distance, its brightness is diminished by 0.21 in magnitude from extinction caused by interstellar gas and dust.

This is a suspected spectroscopic binary with an angular separation of 0.2″ between the two components. The visible component is an evolved giant star with a stellar classification of K1 III. It is a suspected variable star of unknown type, and is around 2.6 billion years old with 1.6 times the mass of the Sun. With the supply of hydrogen at its core exhausted, the star has expanded to 20 times the Sun's radius. It is radiating 128 times the luminosity of the Sun from its swollen photosphere at an effective temperature of 4,473 K.
