= 47 Arietis =

Star in the Aries constellation

Observation data Epoch J2000 Equinox ICRS
- Constellation: Aries
- Right ascension: 02^{h} 58^{m} 05.22131^{s}
- Declination: +20° 40′ 07.4422″
- Apparent magnitude (V): 5.80

Characteristics
- Evolutionary stage: main sequence
- Spectral type: F5 V(e) or F5 IV
- U−B color index: 0.01
- B−V color index: 0.41

Astrometry
Radial velocity (R_{v})	+26.6±0.4 km/s
Proper motion (μ)	RA: +233.959 mas/yr Dec.: −31.607 mas/yr
Parallax (π)	30.6153±0.0689 mas
Distance	106.5 ± 0.2 ly (32.66 ± 0.07 pc)
Absolute magnitude (M_{V})	+3.28

Details
Mass	1.41 M_{☉}
Radius	1.51 R_{☉}
Luminosity	4.09 L_{☉}
Surface gravity (log g)	4.23 cgs
Temperature	6,682 K
Metallicity [Fe/H]	+0.09 dex
Rotational velocity (v sin i)	25 km/s
Age	2.052 Gyr

Other designations
- 47 Aqr, BD+20°480, FK5 1081, HD 18404, HIP 13834, HR 878, SAO 75662, WDS J02581+2040A, GSC 1230:1425

Database references
SIMBAD	data

47 Arietis is a single star in the northern constellation of Aries. The designation is from the star catalogue of English astronomer John Flamsteed, first published in 1712. It is faintly visible to the naked eye with an apparent visual magnitude of 5.80. It has an annual parallax shift of 30.62±0.07 mas, which is equivalent to a physical distance of approximately 106.5 light-years (32.66 parsecs) from Earth.

The star is moving further from the Sun with a radial velocity of +26.6 km/s. It has a relatively high proper motion, traversing the celestial sphere at the rate of 0.237 arc seconds per year. The combination of these movements indicate this star is a member of the Hyades supercluster.

Li et al. (2000) categorized this as an F-type main-sequence star with a stellar classification of F5 V(e). Previously, Cowley (1976) listed a class of F5 IV, which would indicate it is a subgiant star. It is most likely (97.8% chance) the source of X-ray emission that is detected at these coordinates, and it is a radio source. The star has 1.4 times the mass of the Sun and is radiating 4.1 times the Sun's luminosity from its photosphere at an effective temperature of roughly 6,682 K.

47 Arietis has a red dwarf companion at an angular separation of 14.8 arc seconds along a position angle of 113°, as of 1998. This star has a class of M3.5 and an infrared J-band magnitude of 10.47.
