= Tau1 Arietis =

Multiple star system in the constellation Aries

τ^{1} Arietis
- Location of τ^{1} Arietis (circled)

Observation data Epoch J2000 Equinox ICRS
- Constellation: Aries
- Right ascension: 03^{h} 21^{m} 13.62462^{s}
- Declination: +21° 08′ 49.4390″
- Apparent magnitude (V): 5.27

Characteristics
- Evolutionary stage: Main sequence (90% chance)
- Spectral type: B5 IV
- U−B color index: −0.53
- B−V color index: −0.06

Astrometry
Radial velocity (R_{v})	+14 km/s
Proper motion (μ)	RA: +25.651 mas/yr Dec.: −19.850 mas/yr
Parallax (π)	6.1786±0.2066 mas
Distance	530 ± 20 ly (162 ± 5 pc)
Absolute magnitude (M_{V})	−0.66

Details
Mass	5.0±0.1 M_{☉}
Radius	4.45 R_{☉}
Luminosity	234 L_{☉}
Surface gravity (log g)	3.68 cgs
Temperature	12,606 K
Metallicity [Fe/H]	−0.63 dex
Rotational velocity (v sin i)	30 km/s
Age	54.8±5.4 Myr

Other designations
- τ^{1} Ari, 61 Arietis, BD+20 543, FK5 1094, HD 20756, HIP 15627, HR 1005, SAO 75886, PPM 92422, WDS J03212+2109A

Database references
SIMBAD	data

Tau^{1} Arietis is a triple star system in the northern constellation of Aries. Its name is a Bayer designation that is Latinized from τ^{1} Arietis, and abbreviated Tau^{1} Ari or τ^{1} Ari. Based upon an annual parallax shift of 6.1786 mas, it is approximately 530 light-years (162 parsecs) distant from Earth. The combined apparent visual magnitude is 5.27, making it faintly visible to the naked eye.

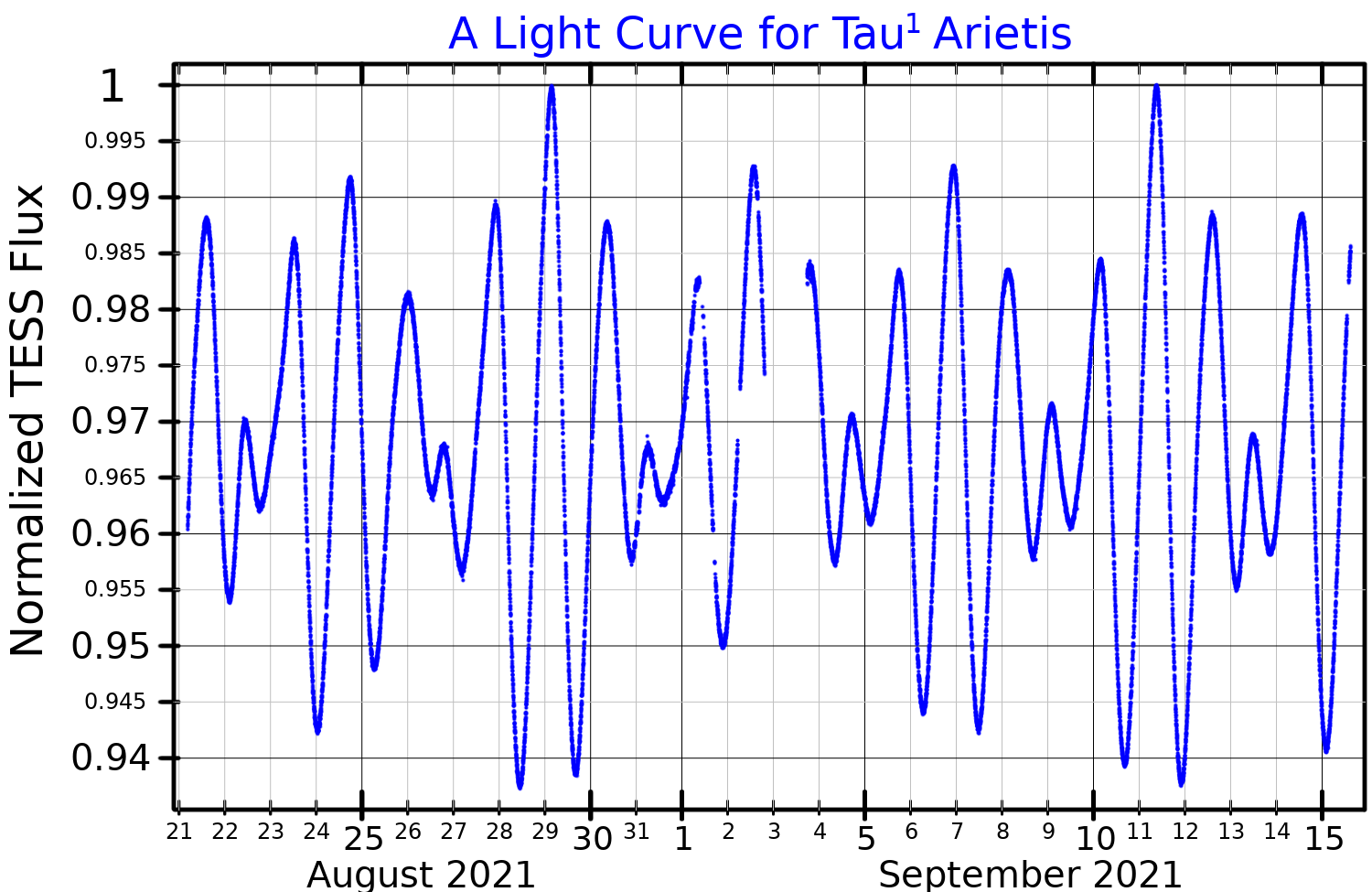
A light curve for Tau^{1} Arietis, plotted from TESS data

The Tau^{1} Arietis system contains three stars. The inner pair form an eclipsing binary system, with the brightness of the pair decreasing by 0.06 in magnitude during an eclipse of the primary. This is a detached binary with an orbital period of 2.2035601139 days. The third stellar component is located at an angular separation of 0.810 arcseconds and has a magnitude of 8.17.

The primary component is a subgiant star with a stellar classification of B5 IV, which suggests it is close to exhausting the supply of hydrogen at its core and evolving away from the main sequence. It has five times the mass of the Sun with about four times the Sun's radius. This star is around 55 million years old and is spinning with a projected rotational velocity of 30 km/s. It is radiating 234 times the luminosity of the Sun from its photosphere at an effective temperature of 12,606 km/s. Based on photometric data, the stellar light curve displays variability with periods of 1.105 and 1.492 days. It has been classified as a candidate slowly pulsating B-type star.

This system is a member of the Cas-Tau OB association of stars that share a common motion through space.
