= Rho1 Arietis =

Star in the constellation Aries

Rho^{1} Arietis
Observation data Epoch J2000.0 Equinox J2000.0 (ICRS)
- Constellation: Aries
- Right ascension: 02^{h} 54^{m} 55.205^{s}
- Declination: +17° 44′ 05.08″
- Apparent magnitude (V): 7.01

Characteristics
- Spectral type: A5 V
- U−B color index: +0.03
- B−V color index: +0.28

Astrometry
Radial velocity (R_{v})	+3.2±3.6 km/s
Proper motion (μ)	RA: +28.985 mas/yr Dec.: −15.890 mas/yr
Parallax (π)	12.5263±0.1441 mas
Distance	260 ± 3 ly (79.8 ± 0.9 pc)
Absolute magnitude (M_{V})	+2.43

Details
Mass	1.65±0.28 M_{☉}
Radius	1.76±0.06 R_{☉}
Luminosity	7.86±0.29 L_{☉}
Surface gravity (log g)	4.17±0.08 cgs
Temperature	7,289±126 K

Other designations
- Rho^{1} Ari, 44 Arietis, BD+17°454, GC 3492, HD 18091, HIP 13579, SAO 93178, PPM 118656, TIC 257918546

Database references
SIMBAD	data

Rho^{1} Arietis is a star in the northern constellation of Aries, the ram. Its name is a Bayer designation that is Latinized from ρ^{1} Arietis, and abbreviated Rho^{1} Ari or ρ^{1} Ari. This star has an apparent visual magnitude of 7.01, making it a challenge to see with the naked eye even under ideal dark-sky conditions. Based upon an annual parallax shift measurement of 12.53 mas, it is approximately 260 light-years (80 parsecs) distant from the Earth.

This is a white-hued A-type main-sequence star with a stellar classification of A5 V. It has 1.7 times the mass of the Sun and 1.8 times the Sun's radius. The star is radiating nearly 8 times the luminosity of the Sun from its photosphere at an effective temperature of 7,289 K.
