= 19 Arietis =

Star in the constellation Aries

Observation data Epoch J2000 Equinox ICRS
- Constellation: Aries
- Right ascension: 02^{h} 13^{m} 03.30440^{s}
- Declination: +15° 16′ 47.5005″
- Apparent magnitude (V): 5.70

Characteristics
- Evolutionary stage: AGB
- Spectral type: M0 III
- U−B color index: +1.95
- B−V color index: +1.55
- R−I color index: 0.97
- Variable type: Semiregular

Astrometry
Radial velocity (R_{v})	21.11 ± 0.26 km/s
Proper motion (μ)	RA: +97.95 mas/yr Dec.: −20.30 mas/yr
Parallax (π)	6.81±0.38 mas
Distance	480 ± 30 ly (147 ± 8 pc)

Details
Radius	39.36 R_{☉}
Luminosity	301.969 L_{☉}
Temperature	3,838±125 K
Metallicity [Fe/H]	−0.02±0.11 dex

Other designations
- BD+14 357, FK5 1057, HD 13596, HIP 10328, HR 648, SAO 92841.

Database references
SIMBAD	data

19 Arietis (abbreviated 19 Ari) is a star in the northern constellation of Aries. 19 Arietis is the Flamsteed designation. It has an apparent visual magnitude of 5.70, which means it is faintly visible to the naked eye. Based upon an annual parallax shift of 6.81 mas, it is approximately 480 light-years (150 parsecs) away from Earth. At that distance, the brightness of the star is diminished by 0.21 in magnitude from extinction caused by interstellar gas and dust.

This is a red giant star with a stellar classification of M0 III. It is a semi-regular variable with periods of 32 and 275 days; the brightness of the star changes by an amplitude of 0.14 in magnitude during those intervals. 19 Arietis has expanded to 39 times the size of the Sun, its photosphere radiates 300 times the luminosity of the Sun. The effective temperature of the outer envelope is 3,838 K, giving it the cool reddish glow of an M-type star.
