= 64 Arietis =

Star in the constellation Aries

Observation data Epoch J2000 Equinox ICRS
- Constellation: Aries
- Right ascension: 03^{h} 24^{m} 18.47709^{s}
- Declination: +24° 43′ 26.7414″
- Apparent magnitude (V): +5.67

Characteristics
- Evolutionary stage: red giant branch
- Spectral type: K4 III
- B−V color index: +1.190±0.015

Astrometry
| Radial velocity (R_{v}) | +8.49±0.09 km/s |
| Proper motion (μ) | RA: +13.781 mas/yr Dec.: −49.347 mas/yr |
| Parallax (π) | 15.2059±0.1237 mas |
| Distance | 214 ± 2 ly (65.8 ± 0.5 pc) |
| Absolute magnitude (M_{V}) | 1.48 |

Details
| Mass | 1.27 M_{☉} |
| Radius | 11 R_{☉} |
| Luminosity | 42 L_{☉} |
| Surface gravity (log g) | 2.5 cgs |
| Temperature | 4,426 K |
| Metallicity [Fe/H] | +0.11±0.04 dex |
| Rotational velocity (v sin i) | 1.4 km/s |
| Age | 5.2 Gyr |

Other designations
- 64 Ari, BD+24°481, HD 21017, HIP 15861, HR 1022, SAO 75912

Database references
| SIMBAD | data |

64 Arietis is a possible binary star system in the northern constellation of Aries. 64 Arietis is the Flamsteed designation. It is faintly visible to the naked eye as a dim, orange-hued star with an apparent visual magnitude of +5.67. Based upon an annual parallax shift of 15.2 mas, this star is approximately 214 light-years (66 parsecs) distant from the Sun. It is receding from the Earth with a heliocentric radial velocity of +8.5 km/s.

The visible component is an aging giant star with a stellar classification of K4 III, currently on the red giant branch. It is around 5.2 billion years old with 1.27 times the mass of the Sun. With the supply of hydrogen at its core exhausted, the star has expanded to 11 times the radius of the Sun and it shines with 42 times the Sun's luminosity. This energy is being radiated from the outer envelope at an effective temperature of 4,426 K, giving it the orange-hued glow of a K-type star.
