= 85 Ceti =

Star in the constellation Aries

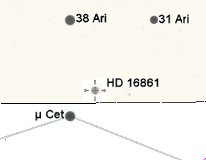
- Location 85 Ceti (HD 16861) within the Aries constellation (pink)

Observation data Epoch J2000 Equinox ICRS
- Constellation: Aries
- Right ascension: 02^{h} 42^{m} 28.93647^{s}
- Declination: +10° 44′ 30.2137″
- Apparent magnitude (V): 6.30

Characteristics
- Spectral type: A2 V
- U−B color index: +0.06
- B−V color index: +0.06
- R−I color index: 0.02

Astrometry
Radial velocity (R_{v})	+6.1 km/s
Proper motion (μ)	RA: –22.88 mas/yr Dec.: –22.95 mas/yr
Parallax (π)	7.87±1.05 mas
Distance	approx. 410 ly (approx. 130 pc)
Absolute magnitude (M_{V})	+0.79

Details
Mass	2.38 ± 0.15 M_{☉}
Luminosity	48 L_{☉}
Temperature	8,810 K
Rotational velocity (v sin i)	18 km/s

Other designations
- BD+10°360, HD 16861, HIP 12647, HR 797, NSV 899, SAO 93067

Database references
SIMBAD	data

85 Ceti is an older Flamsteed designation for a star that is now within the borders of the northern constellation of Aries, the ram. In the present day it is known by star catalogue designations such as HD 16861 and HR 797. It has an apparent visual magnitude of 6.30 and is approximately 410 light-years (130 parsecs) distant from the Earth. This is an A-type main sequence star with a stellar classification of A2 V. It has 2.4 times the mass of the Sun and shines with 48 times the Sun's luminosity. This energy is being radiated into outer space from the star's outer atmosphere at an effective temperature of 8,810 K. This heat gives it the white-hued glow of an A-type star.
