= 54 Ceti =

Star in the constellation Aries

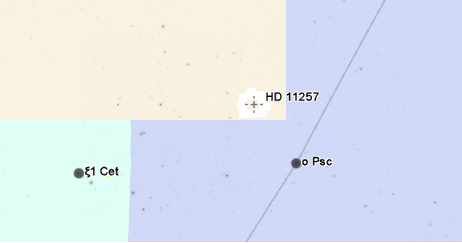
- Location of 54 Ceti (HD 11257) near the constellation boundary of Aries (pink). Nearby are the constellations of Pisces (blue) and Cetus (green).

Observation data Epoch J2000 Equinox J2000
- Constellation: Aries
- Right ascension: 01^{h} 50^{m} 51.97261^{s}
- Declination: +11° 02′ 36.1620″
- Apparent magnitude (V): 5.94

Characteristics
- Evolutionary stage: main sequence
- Spectral type: F2 Vw
- U−B color index: −0.03
- B−V color index: +0.30
- R−I color index: 0.17

Astrometry
| Radial velocity (R_{v}) | +11.1 km/s |
| Proper motion (μ) | RA: −69.516 mas/yr Dec.: −27.5520 mas/yr |
| Parallax (π) | 24.0374±0.0512 mas |
| Distance | 135.7 ± 0.3 ly (41.60 ± 0.09 pc) |
| Absolute magnitude (M_{V}) | 2.80 |

Details
| Mass | 1.48 M_{☉} |
| Radius | 1.62+0.08 −0.05 R_{☉} |
| Luminosity | 6.01±0.03 L_{☉} |
| Surface gravity (log g) | 4.50 cgs |
| Temperature | 7,099 K |
| Metallicity [Fe/H] | −0.20 dex |
| Rotational velocity (v sin i) | 29 km/s |
| Age | 582 Myr |

Other designations
- 54 Cet, NSV 635, BD+10°252, HD 11257, HIP 8588, HR 534, SAO 92659

Database references
| SIMBAD | data |

54 Ceti is an older Flamsteed designation for a star that is now located within the constellation boundaries of Aries, the Ram. In the present day it is known by star catalogue identifiers like HD 11257 or HR 534. At an apparent visual magnitude of 5.94, it can be seen with the naked eye. The distance to this star, as determined using parallax measurements made during the Hipparcos mission, is approximately 139 light-years (43 parsecs), give or take a 6 light-year margin of error. It is located near the ecliptic and hence is subject to occasional occultation by the Moon.

This is an F-type main sequence star with a stellar classification of F2 Vw, where the 'w' indicates weak absorption lines in the spectrum. The star is around 582 million years old with a projected rotational velocity of 29 km/s. It has 1.5 times the mass of the Sun and 1.6 times the Sun's radius. The star is radiating six times the luminosity of the Sun from its photosphere at an effective temperature of 7,099 K. It is a candidate member of the Ursa Major Moving Group, which has an estimated age of 500 ± 100 million years.
