= Tau2 Arietis =

Star in the constellation Aries

τ^{2} Arietis
- Location of τ^{2} Arietis (circled)

Observation data Epoch J2000.0 Equinox J2000.0 (ICRS)
- Constellation: Aries
- Right ascension: 03^{h} 22^{m} 45.241^{s}
- Declination: +20° 44′ 31.44″
- Apparent magnitude (V): +5.09

Characteristics
- Evolutionary stage: main sequence
- Spectral type: K3 III
- U−B color index: +1.27
- B−V color index: 1.238

Astrometry
Radial velocity (R_{v})	+2.45±0.24 km/s
Proper motion (μ)	RA: −53.633 mas/yr Dec.: −14.447 mas/yr
Parallax (π)	9.7639±0.2442 mas
Distance	334 ± 8 ly (102 ± 3 pc)
Absolute magnitude (M_{V})	+0.17

Details
Mass	2.04±0.60 M_{☉}
Radius	19 R_{☉}
Luminosity	120 L_{☉}
Surface gravity (log g)	2.23±0.11 cgs
Temperature	4,479±92 K
Metallicity [Fe/H]	+0.02 dex
Rotational velocity (v sin i)	3.4 km/s
Age	1.6^{+0.6}_{−0.4} Gyr

Other designations
- τ^{2} Ari, 63 Arietis, BD+20 551, GC 4026, HD 20893, HIP 15737, HR 1015, SAO 75899, PPM 92448, WDS J03228+2045A

Database references
SIMBAD	data

Tau^{2} Arietis is a binary star system in the northern constellation on Aries. Its name is a Bayer designation that is Latinized from τ^{2} Arietis, and abbreviated Tau^{2} Ari or τ^{2} Ari. The combined apparent visual magnitude of this system is +5.09, which is bright enough to be seen with the naked eye. With an annual parallax shift of 9.76 mas, it is located at a distance of approximately 334 light-years (102 parsecs) from Earth, give or take an 8 light-year margin of error. At this distance the brightness of the star is diminished by 0.18 in magnitude because of extinction from interstellar gas and dust. The system is receding from the Sun with a radial velocity of +2.5 km/s.

The primary component is an evolved giant star with a stellar classification of K3 III. It is an estimated 1.6 billion years old and is spinning with a projected rotational velocity of 3.4 km/s. With double the mass of the Sun, it has expanded to 19 times the radius of the Sun. The star is radiating 120 times the Sun's luminosity from its enlarged photosphere at an effective temperature of 4,406 K, giving it the cool orange glow of a K-type star. At an angular separation of 0.53 arcseconds is a magnitude 8.50 companion.
