= Theta Arietis =

Binary star system in the constellation Aries

θ Arietis
- Location of θ Arietis (circled)

Observation data Epoch J2000 Equinox J2000
- Constellation: Aries
- Right ascension: 02^{h} 18^{m} 07.531^{s}
- Declination: +19° 54′ 04.17″
- Apparent magnitude (V): 5.58

Characteristics
- Evolutionary stage: main sequence
- Spectral type: A1 Vn
- U−B color index: +0.02
- B−V color index: +0.01
- Variable type: Constant

Astrometry
Radial velocity (R_{v})	+11.95±0.78 km/s
Proper motion (μ)	RA: −7.832 mas/yr Dec.: −3.654 mas/yr
Parallax (π)	7.2220±0.1043 mas
Distance	452 ± 7 ly (138 ± 2 pc)
Absolute magnitude (M_{V})	−0.10

Details

A
Mass	2.10+0.37 −0.31 M_{☉} 2.94±0.06 M_{☉}
Radius	1.9–2.5 R_{☉}
Luminosity	106 L_{☉}
Surface gravity (log g)	4.00±0.25 cgs
Temperature	9,500±1,000 K
Rotational velocity (v sin i)	186 km/s
Age	107+286 −93 Myr

B
Mass	1.0+0.02 −0.04 M_{☉}
Temperature	5,578±109 K
Metallicity [Fe/H]	0.0 dex
Rotational velocity (v sin i)	5 km/s

Other designations
- θ Ari, 22 Arietis, BD+19 340, FK5 81, HD 14191, HIP 10732, HR 669, SAO 92877

Database references
SIMBAD	data

Theta Arietis, is a binary star system in the northern constellation of Aries. Its name is a Bayer designation that is Latinised from θ Arietis, and abbreviated Theta Ari or θ Ari. This star is faintly visible to the naked eye with an apparent visual magnitude of 5.58. With an annual parallax shift of 7.22 mas, the distance to this star is an estimated 452 light-years (139 parsecs) with a 7-light-year margin of error. It is drifting further away from the Sun with a radial velocity of +12 km/s.

The primary, component A, is a white-hued, A-type main-sequence star with a stellar classification of A1 Vn. It is spinning at a rapid pace as shown by the projected rotational velocity of 186 km/s. This is causing the "nebulous" appearance of the absorption lines indicated by the 'n' suffix in the classification. In 2005, C. Neiner and associates classified this as a Be star because is displays emission features in the hydrogen Balmer lines.

In 2016, a solar-mass companion was reported in close orbit around this star, based on observations using adaptive optics with the Gemini North Telescope.
