= Table of stars with Flamsteed designations =

This table lists those stars/objects which have Flamsteed designations by the constellation in which those stars/objects lie. The name given is that of the article if it does not reflect the Flamsteed designation. Some articles are linked twice, in cases where the star has been assigned two different Flamsteed designations, usually as noted in different constellations.

| | 1 | 2 | 3 | 4 | 5 | 6 | 7 | 8 | 9 | 10 | 11 | 12 | 13 | 14 | 15 | 16 | 17 | 18 | 19 | 20 | 21 | 22 | 23 | 24 | 25 | 26 | 27 | 28 | 29 | 30 | 31 | 32 | 33 | 34 | 35 | 36 | 37 | 38 | 39 | 40 | 41 | 42 | 43 | 44 | 45 | 46 | 47 | 48 | 49 | 50 | 51 | 52 | 53 | 54 | 55 | 56 | 57 | 58 | 59 | 60 | 61 | 62 | 63 | 64 | 65 | 66 | 67 | 68 | 69 | 70 | 71 | 72 | 73 | 74 | 75 | 76 | 77 | 78 | 79 | 80 | 81 | 82 | 83 | 84 | 85 | 86 | 87 | 88 | 89 | 90 | 91 | 92 | 93 | 94 | 95 | 96 | 97 | 98 | 99 | 100 | 101 | 102 | 103 | 104 | 105 | 106 | 107 | 108 | 109 | 110 | 111 | 112 | 113 | 114 | 115 | 116 | 117 | 118 | 119 | 120 | 121 | 122 | 123 | 124 | 125 | 126 | 127 | 128 | 129 | 130 | 131 | 132 | 133 | 134 | 135 | 136 | 137 | 138 | 139 | 140 | 141 |
|---|---|---|---|---|---|---|---|---|---|---|---|---|---|---|---|---|---|---|---|---|---|---|---|---|---|---|---|---|---|---|---|---|---|---|---|---|---|---|---|---|---|---|---|---|---|---|---|---|---|---|---|---|---|---|---|---|---|---|---|---|---|---|---|---|---|---|---|---|---|---|---|---|---|---|---|---|---|---|---|---|---|---|---|---|---|---|---|---|---|---|---|---|---|---|---|---|---|---|---|---|---|---|---|---|---|---|---|---|---|---|---|---|---|---|---|---|---|---|---|---|---|---|---|---|---|---|---|---|---|---|---|---|---|---|---|---|---|---|---|---|---|
| And | ο And | 2 And | 3 And | 4 And | 5 And | 6 And | 7 And | 8 And | 9 And | 10 And | 11 And | 12 And | 13 And | 14 And | 15 And | λ And | ι And | 18 And | κ And | ψ And | α And | 22 And | 23 And | θ And | σ And | 26 And | ρ And | 28 And | π And | ε And | δ And | 32 And | (Andromeda Galaxy) | ζ And | ν And | 36 And | μ And | η And | 39 And | σ Psc (Note: In Pisces; also known as 69 Piscium) | 41 And | φ And | β And | 44 And | 45 And | ξ And | 47 And | ω And | 49 And | υ And | 51 And | χ And | τ And | φ Per (Note: In Perseus) | 55 And | 56 And | γ And | 58 And | 59 And | 60 And | V520 Per | 62 And | 63 And | 64 And | 65 And | 66 And | | | | | | | | | | | | | | | | | | | | | | | | | | | | | | | | | | | | | | | | | | | | | | | | | | | | | | | | | | | | | | | | | | | | | | | | | | | |
Ant
Aps
| Aqr | 1 Aqr | ε Aqr | 3 Aqr | 4 Aqr | 5 Aqr | μ Aqr | 7 Aqr | 8 Aqr | 9 Aqr | 10 Aqr | 11 Aqr | 12 Aqr | ν Aqr | 14 Aqr | 15 Aqr | 16 Aqr | 17 Aqr | 18 Aqr | 19 Aqr | 20 Aqr | 21 Aqr | β Aqr | ξ Aqr | 24 Aqr | 25 Aqr | 26 Aqr | 11 Peg (Note: In Pegasus) | 28 Aqr | 29 Aqr | 30 Aqr | ο Aqr | 32 Aqr | ι Aqr | α Aqr | 35 Aqr | 36 Aqr | 37 Aqr | 38 Aqr | 39 Aqr | 40 Aqr | 41 Aqr | 42 Aqr | θ Aqr | 44 Aqr | 45 Aqr | ρ Aqr | 47 Aqr | γ Aqr | 49 Aqr | 50 Aqr | 51 Aqr | π Aqr | 53 Aqr | 54 Aqr | ζ Aqr | 56 Aqr | σ Aqr | 58 Aqr | υ Aqr | 60 Aqr | 61 Aqr | η Aqr | κ Aqr | 64 Aqr | 65 Aqr | 66 Aqr | 67 Aqr | 68 Aqr | τ^{1} Aqr | 70 Aqr | τ^{2} Aqr | 72 Aqr | λ Aqr | 74 Aqr | 75 Aqr | δ Aqr | 77 Aqr | 78 Aqr | Fomalhaut (Note: In Piscis Austrinus; also known as 24 Piscis Austrini) | HD 217563? | 81 Aqr | 82 Aqr | 83 Aqr | 84 Aqr | 85 Aqr | 86 Aqr | 87 Aqr | 88 Aqr | 89 Aqr | φ Aqr | ψ^{1} Aqr | χ Aqr | ψ^{2} Aqr | 94 Aqr | ψ^{3} Aqr | 96 Aqr | 97 Aqr | 98 Aqr | 99 Aqr | 100 Aqr | 101 Aqr | ω^{1} Aqr | 103 Aqr | 104 Aqr | ω^{2} Aqr | 106 Aqr | 107 Aqr | 108 Aqr | | | | | | | | | | | | | | | | | | | | | | | | | | | | | | | | | |
| Aql | α Sct (Note: In Scutum) | δ Sct | ε Sct | 4 Aql | 5 Aql | β Sct | 7 Aql | 8 Aql | η Sct | 10 Aql | 11 Aql | 12 Aql | ε Aql | 14 Aql | 15 Aql | λ Aql | ζ Aql | 18 Aql | 19 Aql | 20 Aql | 21 Aql | 22 Aql | 23 Aql | 24 Aql | ω^{1} Aql | 26 Aql | 27 Aql | 28 Aql | ω^{2} Aql | δ Aql | 31 Aql | ν Aql | | | 35 Aql | 36 Aql | 37 Aql | μ Aql | κ Aql | | ι Aql | 42 Aql | | σ Aql | 45 Aql | 46 Aql | χ Aql | ψ Aql | υ Aql | γ Aql | 51 Aql | π Aql | Altair | ο Aql | η Aql | 56 Aql | 57 Aql | 58 Aql | ξ Aql | β Aql | φ Aql | 62 Aql | τ Aql | 64 Aql | θ Aql | 66 Aql | ρ Aql (Note: In Delphinus) | 68 Aql | 69 Aql | 70 Aql | 71 Aql | | | | | | | | | | | | | | | | | | | | | | | | | | | | | | | | | | | | | | | | | | | | | | | | | | | | | | | | | | | | | | | | | | | | | | |
Ara
| Ari | 1 Ari | 107 Psc (Note: In Pisces) | HR 515 | 4 Ari | γ Ari | β Ari | 7 Ari | ι Ari | λ Ari | 10 Ari | 11 Ari | κ Ari | α Ari | 14 Ari | 15 Ari | 16 Ari | η Ari | | 19 Ari | 20 Ari | 21 Ari | θ Ari | 23 Ari | ξ Ari | 25 Ari (Note: In Cetus) | 26 Ari | 27 Ari | | 29 Ari | 30 Ari | 31 Ari | ν Ari | 33 Ari | μ Ari | 35 Ari | 36 Ari | ο Ari | 38 Ari | 39 Ari | 40 Ari | 41 Ari | π Ari | σ Ari | ρ^{1} Ari | ρ^{2} Ari | ρ^{3} Ari | 47 Ari | ε Ari | 49 Ari | 50 Ari | 51 Ari | 52 Ari | 53 Ari | 54 Ari | 55 Ari | 56 Ari | δ Ari | ζ Ari | 59 Ari | 60 Ari | τ^{1} Ari | 62 Ari | τ^{2} Ari | 64 Ari | 65 Ari | 66 Ari | | | | | | | | | | | | | | | | | | | | | | | | | | | | | | | | | | | | | | | | | | | | | | | | | | | | | | | | | | | | | | | | | | | | | | | | | | | |
| Aur | 1 Aur | 2 Aur | ι Aur | ω Aur | 5 Aur | 6 Aur | ε Aur | ζ Aur | 9 Aur | η Aur | μ Aur | 12 Aur | Capella | 14 Aur | λ Aur | 16 Aur | 17 Aur | 18 Aur | 19 Aur | ρ Aur | σ Aur | 22 Aur | β Tau (Note: In Taurus; also known as 112 Tauri) | φ Aur | χ Aur | 26 Aur | ο Aur | 28 Aur | τ Aur | ξ Aur | υ Aur | ν Aur | δ Aur | β Aur | π Aur | 36 Aur | θ Aur | 38 Aur | 39 Aur | 40 Aur | 41 Aur | 42 Aur | 43 Aur | κ Aur | 45 Aur | ψ^{1} Aur | 47 Aur | 48 Aur | 49 Aur | ψ^{2} Aur | 51 Aur | ψ^{3} Aur | 53 Aur | 54 Aur | ψ^{4} Aur | ψ^{5} Aur | ψ^{6} Aur | ψ^{7} Aur | 59 Aur | 60 Aur | ψ^{8} Aur | 62 Aur | 63 Aur | 64 Aur | 65 Aur | 66 Aur | | | | | | | | | | | | | | | | | | | | | | | | | | | | | | | | | | | | | | | | | | | | | | | | | | | | | | | | | | | | | | | | | | | | | | | | | | | |
| Boo | 1 Boo | 2 Boo | 3 Boo | τ Boo | υ Boo | 6 Boo | 7 Boo | η Boo | 9 Boo | 10 Boo | 11 Boo | 12 Boo | 13 Boo | 14 Boo | 15 Boo | Arcturus | κ Boo | 18 Boo | λ Boo | 20 Boo | ι Boo | 22 Boo | θ Boo | 24 Boo | ρ Boo | 26 Boo | γ Boo | σ Boo | π Boo | ζ Boo | 31 Boo | 32 Boo | 33 Boo | 34 Boo | ο Boo | ε Boo | ξ Boo | 38 Boo | 39 Boo | 40 Boo | ω Boo | β Boo | ψ Boo | 44 Boo | 45 Boo | 46 Boo | 47 Boo | χ Boo | δ Boo | 50 Boo | μ Boo | ν^{1} Boo | ν^{2} Boo | φ Boo | | | | | | | | | | | | | | | | | | | | | | | | | | | | | | | | | | | | | | | | | | | | | | | | | | | | | | | | | | | | | | | | | | | | | | | | | | | | | | | | | | | | | | | |
Cae
| Cam | 1 Cam | 2 Cam | 3 Cam | 4 Cam | 5 Cam | 6 Cam | 7 Cam | 8 Cam | α Cam | β Cam | 11 Cam | 12 Cam | | 14 Cam | 15 Cam | 16 Cam | 17 Cam | 18 Cam | 19 Cam | 20 Cam | 21 Cam | 22 Cam | 23 Cam | 24 Cam | 25 Cam (Note: In Auriga) | 26 Cam | | 28 Cam | 29 Cam | 30 Cam | 31 Cam | ξ Aur (Note: In Auriga, also known as 30 Aurigae) | 33 Cam | 34 Cam | 35 Cam | 36 Cam | 37 Cam | 38 Cam | 39 Cam | 40 Cam | 41 Cam | 42 Cam | 43 Cam | 44 Cam (Note: In Lynx) | 45 Cam | 46 Cam | 47 Cam | 48 Cam | 49 Cam | 50 Cam | 51 Cam | 52 Cam | 53 Cam | 54 Cam | 55 Cam (Note: In Ursa Major) | 56 Cam | 57 Cam | 30 Lyn | | | | | | | | | | | | | | | | | | | | | | | | | | | | | | | | | | | | | | | | | | | | | | | | | | | | | | | | | | | | | | | | | | | | | | | | | | | | | | | | | | | |
| Cnc | 1 Cnc | ω Cnc | 3 Cnc | 4 Cnc | 5 Cnc | χ Gem (Note: In Gemini) | 7 Cnc | 8 Cnc | μ^{1} Cnc | μ^{2} Cnc | 11 Cnc | 12 Cnc | ψ^{1} Cnc | ψ^{2} Cnc | 15 Cnc | ζ Cnc | β Cnc | χ Cnc | λ Cnc | 20 Cnc | 21 Cnc | φ^{1} Cnc | φ^{2} Cnc | 24 Cnc | 25 Cnc | | 27 CnC | 28 Cnc | 29 Cnc | υ^{1} Cnc | θ Cnc | υ^{2} Cnc | η Cnc | 34 Cnc | 35 Cnc | 36 Cnc | 37 Cnc | 38 Cnc | 39 Cnc | 40 Cnc | ε Cnc | 42 Cnc | γ Cnc | 44 Cnc | 45 Cnc | 46 Cnc | δ Cnc | ι Cnc | 49 Cnc | 50 Cnc | σ^{1} Cnc | 52 Cnc | 53 Cnc | 54 Cnc | ρ^{1} Cnc | | 57 Cnc | ρ^{2} Cnc | σ^{2} Cnc | 60 Cnc | 61 Cnc | ο^{1} Cnc | ο^{2} Cnc | σ^{3} Cnc | α Cnc | 66 Cnc | 67 Cnc | 68 Cnc | ν Cnc | 70 Cnc | 71 Cnc | τ Cnc | | | 75 Cnc | κ Cnc | ξ Cnc | 78 Cnc | 79 Cnc | 80 Cnc | π^{1} Cnc | π^{2} Cnc | 83 Cnc | | | | | | | | | | | | | | | | | | | | | | | | | | | | | | | | | | | | | | | | | | | | | | | | | | | | | | | | | | |
| CVn | 1 CVn | 2 CVn | 3 CVn | 4 CVn | 5 CVn | 6 CVn | 7 CVn | β CVn | 9 CVn | 10 CVn | 11 CVn | Cor Caroli | 37 Com (Note: In Coma Berenices) | 14 CVn | 15 CVn | 16 CVn | 17 CVn | 18 CVn | 19 CVn | 20 CVn | 20 CVn | 21 CVn | | 23 CVn | 24 CVn | 25 CVn | | | | | | | | | | | | | | | | | | | | | | | | | | | | | | | | | | | | | | | | | | | | | | | | | | | | | | | | | | | | | | | | | | | | | | | | | | | | | | | | | | | | | | | | | | | | | | | | | | | | | | | | | | | | | | | | | | | |
| CMa | ζ CMa | β CMa | δ Col (Note: In Columba) | ξ^{1} CMa | ξ^{2} CMa | ν^{1} CMa | ν^{2} CMa | ν^{3} CMa | Sirius | 10 CMa | 11 CMa | 12 CMa | κ CMa | θ CMa | 15 CMa | ο^{1} CMa | 17 CMa | μ CMa | π CMa | ι CMa | ε CMa | σ Cma | γ CMa | ο^{2} CMa | δ CMa | 26 CMa | 27 CMa | ω CMa | 29 CMa | τ CMa | η CMa | | | | | | | | | | | | | | | | | | | | | | | | | | | | | | | | | | | | | | | | | | | | | | | | | | | | | | | | | | | | | | | | | | | | | | | | | | | | | | | | | | | | | | | | | | | | | | | | | | | | | | | | | | | | | | |
| CMi | 1 CMi | ε CMi | β CMi | γ CMi | η CMi | 6 CMi | δ^{1} CMi | δ^{2} CMi | δ^{3} CMi | Procyon | 11 CMi | | ζ CMi | 14 CMi | | | | | | | | | | | | | | | | | | | | | | | | | | | | | | | | | | | | | | | | | | | | | | | | | | | | | | | | | | | | | | | | | | | | | | | | | | | | | | | | | | | | | | | | | | | | | | | | | | | | | | | | | | | | | | | | | | | | | | | | | | | | | | | |
| Cap | ξ^{1} Cap | ξ^{2} Cap | 3 Cap | 4 Cap | α^{1} Cap | α^{2} Cap | σ Cap | ν Cap | β Cap | π Cap | ρ Cap | ο Cap | τ^{1} Cap | τ^{2} Cap | υ Cap | ψ Cap | 17 Cap | ω Cap | 19 Cap | 20 Cap | 21 Cap | η Cap | θ Cap | 24 Cap | χ Cap | 26 Cap | 27 Cap | φ Cap | 29 Cap | 30 Cap | 31 Cap | ι Cap | 33 Cap | ζ Cap | 35 Cap | 36 Cap | 37 Cap | 38 Cap | ε Cap | γ Cap | 41 Cap | 42 Cap | κ Cap | 44 Cap | 45 Cap | 46 Cap | 47 Cap | λ Cap | δ Cap | 50 Cap | μ Cap | | | | | | | | | | | | | | | | | | | | | | | | | | | | | | | | | | | | | | | | | | | | | | | | | | | | | | | | | | | | | | | | | | | | | | | | | | | | | | | | | | | | | | | | | | |
Car
| Cas | 1 Cas | 2 Cas | (Cas A?) | 4 Cas | τ Cas | 6 Cas | ρ Cas | σ Cas | 9 Cas | 10 Cas | β Cas | 12 Cas | 13 Cas | λ Cas | κ Cas | 16 Cas | ζ Cas | α Cas | ξ Cas | π Cas | 21 Cas | ο Cas | 23 Cas | η Cas | ν Cas | υ^{1} Cas | γ Cas | υ^{2} Cas | | μ Cas | 31 Cas | 32 Cas | θ Cas | φ Cas | 35 Cas | ψ Cas | δ Cas | 38 Cas | χ Cas | 40 Cas | | 42 Cas | 43 Cas | 44 Cas | ε Cas | ω Cas | 47 Cas | 48 Cas | 49 Cas | 50 Cas | 51 Cas | 52 Cas | 53 Cas | 54 Cas | 55 Cas | | | | | | | | | | | | | | | | | | | | | | | | | | | | | | | | | | | | | | | | | | | | | | | | | | | | | | | | | | | | | | | | | | | | | | | | | | | | | | | | | | | | | | |
| Cen | 1 Cen | 2 Cen | 3 Cen | 4 Cen | θ Cen | | | | | | | | | | | | | | | | | | | | | | | | | | | | | | | | | | | | | | | | | | | | | | | | | | | | | | | | | | | | | | | | | | | | | | | | | | | | | | | | | | | | | | | | | | | | | | | | | | | | | | | | | | | | | | | | | | | | | | | | | | | | | | | | | | | | | | | | |
| Cep | κ Cep | θ Cep | η Cep | 4 Cep | α Cep | 6 Cep | 7 Cep | β Cep | 9 Cep | ν Cep | 11 Cep | 12 Cep | 13 Cep | 14 Cep | 15 Cep | 16 Cep | ξ Cep | 18 Cep | 19 Cep | 20 Cep | ζ Cep | λ Cep | ε Cep | 24 Cep | 25 Cep | 26 Cep | δ Cep | ρ^{1} Cep | ρ^{2} Cep | 30 Cep | 31 Cep | ι Cep | π Cep | ο Cep | γ Cep | | | | | | | | | | | | | | | | | | | | | | | | | | | | | | | | | | | | | | | | | | | | | | | | | | | | | | | | | | | | | | | | | | | | | | | | | | | | | | | | | | | | | | | | | | | | | | | | | | | | | | | | | | |
| Cet | 1 Cet | 2 Cet | 3 Cet | 4 Cet | 5 Cet | 6 Cet | 7 Cet | ι Cet | 9 Cet | 10 Cet | 11 Cet | 12 Cet | 13 Cet | 14 Cet | 15 Cet | β Cet | φ^{1} Cet | 18 Cet | φ^{2} Cet | 20 Cet | 21 Cet | φ^{3} Cet | φ^{4} Cet | | 25 Cet | 26 Cet | 27 Cet | 28 Cet | 29 Cet | 30 Cet | η Cet | 32 Cet | 33 Cet | 34 Cet | 35 Cet | 36 Cet | 37 Cet | 38 Cet | 39 Cet | 40 Cet | 41 Cet | 42 Cet | 43 Cet | 44 Cet | θ Cet | 46 Cet | 47 Cet | 48 Cet | 49 Cet | 50 Cet | ν Psc (Note: In Pisces; also known as 106 Piscium) | τ Cet | χ Cet | 54 Cet (Note: In Aries) | ζ Cet | 56 Cet | 57 Cet | 58 Cet | υ Cet | 60 Cet | 61 Cet | 62 Cet | 63 Cet | 64 Cet | ξ^{1} Cet | 66 Cet | 67 Cet | Mira; Mira B | 69 Cet | 70 Cet | 71 Cet | ρ Cet | ξ^{2} Cet | | 75 Cet | σ Cet | 77 Cet | ν Cet | 79 Cet | 80 Cet | 81 Cet | δ Cet | ε Cet | 84 Cet | 85 Cet | γ Cet | μ Cet | 38 Ari | π Cet | τ^{1} Eri (Note: In Eridanus; also known as 1 Eridani) | λ Cet | α Cet | 93 Cet | 94 Cet | 95 Cet | κ^{1} Cet | κ^{2} Cet | | | | | | | | | | | | | | | | | | | | | | | | | | | | | | | | | | | | | | | | | | | | |
Cha
Cir
Col
| Com | 1 Com | 2 Com | 3 Com | 4 Com | 5 Com | 6 Com | 7 Com | 8 Com | 9 Com | 10 Com | 11 Com | 12 Com | 13 Com | 14 Com | γ Com | 16 Com | 17 Com | 18 Com | | 20 Com | 21 Com | 22 Com | 23 Com | 24 Com | 25 Com | 26 Com | 27 Com | 28 Com | 29 Com | 30 Com | 31 Com | 32 Com | 33 Com | | 35 Com | 36 Com | 37 Com | 38 Com | 39 Com | 40 Com | 41 Com | α Com | β Com | | | | | | | | | | | | | | | | | | | | | | | | | | | | | | | | | | | | | | | | | | | | | | | | | | | | | | | | | | | | | | | | | | | | | | | | | | | | | | | | | | | | | | | | | | | | | | | | | | |
CrA
| CrB | ο CrB | η CrB | β CrB | θ CrB | α CrB | μ CrB | ζ CrB | γ CrB | π CrB | δ CrB | κ CrB | λ CrB | ε CrB | ι CrB | ρ CrB | τ CrB | σ CrB | υ CrB | ξ CrB | ν^{1} CrB | ν^{2} CrB | | | | | | | | | | | | | | | | | | | | | | | | | | | | | | | | | | | | | | | | | | | | | | | | | | | | | | | | | | | | | | | | | | | | | | | | | | | | | | | | | | | | | | | | | | | | | | | | | | | | | | | | | | | | | | | | | | | | | | | | |
| Crv | α Crv | ε Crv | 3 Crv | γ Crv | ζ Crv | 6 Crv | δ Crv | η Crv | β Crv | | | | | | | | | | | | | | | | | | | | | | | | | | | | | | | | | | | | | | | | | | | | | | | | | | | | | | | | | | | | | | | | | | | | | | | | | | | | | | | | | | | | | | | | | | | | | | | | | | | | | | | | | | | | | | | | | | | | | | | | | | | | | | | | | | | | |
| Crt | φ^{2} Hya (Note: In Hydra) | φ^{3} Hya | 3 Crt | ν Hya | 5 Crt | 6 Crt | α Crt | 8 Crt | χ^{1} Hya | HD 96819 | β Crt | δ Crt | λ Crt | ε Crt | γ Crt | κ Crt | 17 Crt | 18 Crt | ξ Hya | HR 4458 | θ Crt | 22 Crt | 23 Crt | ι Crt | ο Hya | 26 Crt | ζ Crt | β Hya | 29 Crt | η Crt | 31 Crt (Note: In Corvus) | | | | | | | | | | | | | | | | | | | | | | | | | | | | | | | | | | | | | | | | | | | | | | | | | | | | | | | | | | | | | | | | | | | | | | | | | | | | | | | | | | | | | | | | | | | | | | | | | | | | | | | | | | | | | | |
Cru
| Cyg | κ Cyg | 2 Cyg | 3 Cyg (Note: In Vulpecula) | 4 Cyg | | β Cyg | ι^{1} Cyg | 8 Cyg | 9 Cyg | ι^{2} Cyg | 11 Cyg | φ Cyg | θ Cyg | 14 Cyg | 15 Cyg | 16 Cyg | 17 Cyg | δ Cyg | 19 Cyg | 20 Cyg | η Cyg | 22 Cyg | 23 Cyg | ψ Cyg | 25 Cyg | 26 Cyg | 27 Cyg | 28 Cyg | 29 Cyg | 30 Cyg | ο^{1} Cyg | ο^{2} Cyg | 33 Cyg | P Cyg | 35 Cyg | 36 Cyg | γ Cyg | | 39 Cyg | 40 Cyg | 41 Cyg | 42 Cyg | 43 Cyg | 44 Cyg | ω^{1} Cyg | ω^{2} Cyg | 47 Cyg | 48 Cyg | 49 Cyg | Deneb | 51 Cyg | 52 Cyg | ε Cyg | λ Cyg | 55 Cyg | 56 Cyg | 57 Cyg | ν Cyg | 59 Cyg | 60 Cyg | 61 Cyg | ξ Cyg | 63 Cyg | ζ Cyg | τ Cyg | υ Cyg | σ Cyg | 68 Cyg | 69 Cyg | 70 Cyg | 71 Cyg | 72 Cyg | ρ Cyg | 74 Cyg | 75 Cyg | 76 Cyg | 77 Cyg | μ Cyg | 79 Cyg | π^{1} Cyg | π^{2} Cyg | | | | | | | | | | | | | | | | | | | | | | | | | | | | | | | | | | | | | | | | | | | | | | | | | | | | | | | | | | | | |
| Del | 1 Del | ε Del | η Del | ζ Del | ι Del | β Del | κ Del | θ Del | α Del | 10 Del | δ Del | γ Del | 13 Del | 14 Del | 15 Del | 16 Del | 17 Del | 18 Del | | | | | | | | | | | | | | | | | | | | | | | | | | | | | | | | | | | | | | | | | | | | | | | | | | | | | | | | | | | | | | | | | | | | | | | | | | | | | | | | | | | | | | | | | | | | | | | | | | | | | | | | | | | | | | | | | | | | | | | | | | | |
Dor
| Dra | λ Dra | 2 Dra | 3 Dra | 4 Dra | κ Dra | 6 Dra | 7 Dra | 8 Dra | 9 Dra | 10 Dra | Thuban | ι Dra | θ Dra | η Dra | 15 Dra | 16 Dra | 17 Dra | 18 Dra | 19 Dra | 20 Dra | μ Dra | ζ Dra | β Dra | ν^{1} Dra | ν^{2} Dra | 26 Dra | 27 Dra | ω Dra | 29 Dra | 30 Dra | ψ^{1} Dra | ξ Dra | γ Dra | ψ^{2} Dra | 35 Dra | 36 Dra | 37 Dra | 38 Dra | 39 Dra | 40 Dra | 41 Dra | 42 Dra | φ Dra | χ Dra | 45 Dra | 46 Dra | ο Dra | 48 Dra | 49 Dra | 50 Dra | 51 Dra | υ Dra | 53 Dra | 54 Dra | 55 Dra | | δ Dra | π Dra | 59 Dra | τ Dra | σ Dra | | ε Dra | 64 Dra | 65 Dra | 66 Dra | ρ Dra | 68 Dra | 69 Dra | | 71 Dra | 72 Dra | 73 Dra | 74 Dra | 75 Dra | 76 Dra | 77 Dra (Note: In Cepheus) | 78 Dra | 79 Dra | 80 Dra | | | | | | | | | | | | | | | | | | | | | | | | | | | | | | | | | | | | | | | | | | | | | | | | | | | | | | | | | | | | | |
| Equ | ε Equ | λ Equ | ζ Equ | 4 Equ | γ Equ | 6 Equ | δ Equ | α Equ | 9 Equ | β Equ | | | | | | | | | | | | | | | | | | | | | | | | | | | | | | | | | | | | | | | | | | | | | | | | | | | | | | | | | | | | | | | | | | | | | | | | | | | | | | | | | | | | | | | | | | | | | | | | | | | | | | | | | | | | | | | | | | | | | | | | | | | | | | | | | | | |
| Eri | τ^{1} Eri | τ^{2} Eri | η Eri | 4 Eri | 5 Eri | 6 Eri | 7 Eri | ρ^{1} Eri | ρ^{2} Eri | ρ^{3} Eri | τ^{3} Eri | α For (Note: In Fornax) | ζ Eri | 14 Eri | 15 Eri | τ^{4} Eri | 17 Eri | ε Eri | τ^{5} Eri | 20 Eri | 21 Eri | 22 Eri | δ Eri | 24 Eri | 25 Eri | π Eri | τ^{6} Eri | τ^{7} Eri | 29 Eri | 30 Eri | | 32 Eri | τ^{8} Eri | γ Eri | 35 Eri | τ^{9} Eri | 37 Eri | ο^{1} Eri | 39 Eri | ο^{2} Eri | υ^{4} Eri | ξ Eri | υ^{3} Eri | 44 Eri (Note: In Taurus) | 45 Eri | 46 Eri | 47 Eri | ν Eri | 49 Eri | υ^{1} Eri | 51 Eri | υ^{2} Eri | 53 Eri | 54 Eri | 55 Eri | 56 Eri | μ Eri | 58 Eri | 59 Eri | 60 Eri | ω Eri | 62 Eri | 63 Eri | 64 Eri | ψ Eri | 66 Eri | β Eri | 68 Eri | λ Eri | | | | | | | | | | | | | | | | | | | | | | | | | | | | | | | | | | | | | | | | | | | | | | | | | | | | | | | | | | | | | | | | | | | | | | | | |
For
| Gem | 1 Gem | 2 Gem | 3 Gem | 4 Gem | 5 Gem | 6 Gem | η Gem | 8 Gem | 9 Gem | 10 Gem | 11 Gem | 12 Gem | μ Gem | 14 Gem | 15 Gem | 16 Gem | | ν Gem | 19 Gem | 20 Gem | | 22 Gem | 23 Gem | γ Gem | 25 Gem | 26 Gem | ε Gem | 28 Gem | | 30 Gem | ξ Gem | 32 Gem | 33 Gem | θ Gem | 35 Gem | 36 Gem | 37 Gem | 38 Gem | 39 Gem | 40 Gem | 41 Gem | ω Gem | ζ Gem | 44 Gem | 45 Gem | τ Gem | 47 Gem | 48 Gem | 49 Gem | | 51 Gem | 52 Gem | 53 Gem | λ Gem | δ Gem | 56 Gem | 57 Gem | 58 Gem | 59 Gem | ι Gem | 61 Gem | ρ Gem | 63 Gem | 64 Gem | 65 Gem | Castor | 67 Gem | 68 Gem | υ Gem | 70 Gem | ο Gem | | | 74 Gem | σ Gem | 76 Gem | κ Gem | Pollux | 79 Gem | π Gem | 81 Gem | 82 Gem | φ Gem | 84 Gem | 85 Gem | | | | | | | | | | | | | | | | | | | | | | | | | | | | | | | | | | | | | | | | | | | | | | | | | | | | | | | | |
Gru
| Her | χ Her | 2 Her | 3 Her (Note: In Serpens) | 4 Her | 5 Her | υ Her | κ Her | 8 Her | 9 Her | 10 Her | φ Her | 12 Her | 13 Her | 14 Her | 15 Her | 16 Her | 17 Her | 18 Her | 19 Her | γ Her | 21 Her | τ Her | 23 Her (Note: In Corona Borealis) | ω Her | 25 Her | 26 Her | β Her | 28 Her | 29 Her | 30 Her | 31 Her | 32 Her | 33 Her | 34 Her | σ Her | 36 Her | 37 Her | 38 Her | 39 Her | ζ Her | 41 Her | 42 Her | 43 Her | η Her | 45 Her | 46 Her | 47 Her | 48 Her | 49 Her | 50 Her | 51 Her | 52 Her | 53 Her | 54 Her | | 56 Her | 57 Her | ε Her | 59 Her | 60 Her | 61 Her | 62 Her | 63 Her | α Her | δ Her | 66 Her (Note: In Ophiuchus) | π Her | 68 Her | 69 Her | 70 Her | | 72 Her | 73 Her | 74 Her | ρ Her | λ Her | 77 Her | 78 Her | 79 Her | | | 82 Her | 83 Her | 84 Her | ι Her | μ Her | 87 Her | 88 Her | 89 Her | 90 Her | θ Her | ξ Her | 93 Her | ν Her | 95 Her | 96 Her | 97 Her | 98 Her | 99 Her | 100 Her | 101 Her | 102 Her | ο Her | 104 Her | 105 Her | 106 Her | 107 Her | 108 Her | 109 Her | 110 Her | 111 Her | 112 Her | 113 Her | | | | | | | | | | | | | | | | | | | | | | | | | | | | |
Hor
| Hya | 1 Hya | 2 Hya | 3 Hya | δ Hya | σ Hya | 6 Hya | η Hya | | 9 Hya | 10 Hya | ε Hya | 12 Hya | ρ Hya | 14 Hya | 15 Hya | ζ Hya | 17 Hya | ω Hya | 19 Hya | 20 Hya | 21 Hya | θ Hya | 23 Hya | 24 Hya | 25 Hya | 26 Hya | 27 Hya | 28 Hya | 29 Hya | Alphard | τ^{1} Hya | τ^{2} Hya | 33 Hya | 34 Hya | ι Hya | | 37 Hya | κ Hya | υ^{1} Hya | υ^{2} Hya | λ Hya | μ Hya | φ^{1} Hya | 44 Hya | ψ Hya | γ Hya | 47 Hya | 48 Hya | π Hya | 50 Hya | 51 Hya | 52 Hya | 4 Lib (Note: In Libra) | 54 Hya | 55 Hya | 56 Hya | 57 Hya | 58 Hya | 59 Hya | 60 Hya | | | | | | | | | | | | | | | | | | | | | | | | | | | | | | | | | | | | | | | | | | | | | | | | | | | | | | | | | | | | | | | | | | | | | | | | | | | | | | | | | |
Hyi
Ind
| Lac | 1 Lac | 2 Lac | β Lac | 4 Lac | 5 Lac | 6 Lac | α Lac | 8 Lac | 9 Lac | 10 Lac | 11 Lac | 12 Lac | 13 Lac | 14 Lac | 15 Lac | 16 Lac | | | | | | | | | | | | | | | | | | | | | | | | | | | | | | | | | | | | | | | | | | | | | | | | | | | | | | | | | | | | | | | | | | | | | | | | | | | | | | | | | | | | | | | | | | | | | | | | | | | | | | | | | | | | | | | | | | | | | | | | | | | | | |
| Leo | κ Leo | ω Leo | 3 Leo | λ Leo | ξ Leo | 6 Leo | 7 Leo | 8 Leo | 9 Leo | 10 Leo | 11 Leo | 12 Leo | 13 Leo | ο Leo | 15 Leo | ψ Leo | ε Leo | 18 Leo | 19 Leo | 20 Leo | 21 Leo | 22 Leo | 23 Leo | μ Leo | | 26 Leo | ν Leo | | π Leo | η Leo | 31 Leo | Regulus | 33 Leo | 34 Leo | 35 Leo | ζ Leo | 37 Leo | | 39 Leo | 40 Leo | γ Leo | 42 Leo | 43 Leo | 44 Leo | 45 Leo | 46 Leo | ρ Leo | 48 Leo | 49 Leo | 50 Leo | 51 Leo | 52 Leo | 53 Leo | 54 Leo | 55 Leo | 56 Leo | 57 Leo | 58 Leo | 59 Leo | 60 Leo | 61 Leo | 62 Leo | χ Leo | 64 Leo | 65 Leo | 66 Leo | 67 Leo | δ Leo | 69 Leo | θ Leo | 71 Leo | 72 Leo | 73 Leo | φ Leo | 75 Leo | 76 Leo | σ Leo | ι Leo | 79 Leo | 80 Leo | 81 Leo | 82 Leo | 83 Leo | τ Leo | 85 Leo | 86 Leo | 87 Leo | 88 Leo | 89 Leo | 90 Leo | υ Leo | 92 Leo | 93 Leo | Denebola | 95 Leo | | | | | | | | | | | | | | | | | | | | | | | | | | | | | | | | | | | | | | | | | | | | | | |
| LMi | 1 LMi (Note: In Cancer) | 2 LMi | 3 LMi | 4 LMi | 5 LMi | 6 LMi (Note: In Leo) | 7 LMi | 8 LMi | 9 LMi | 10 LMi | 11 LMi | | 13 LMi | 14 LMi | 15 LMi | 16 LMi | 17 LMi | 18 LMi | 19 LMi | 20 LMi | 21 LMi | 22 LMi | 23 LMi | 24 LMi | 25 LMi | 26 LMi | 27 LMi | 28 LMi | 29 LMi | 30 LMi | β LMi | 32 LMi | 33 LMi | 34 LMi | 35 LMi | 36 LMi | 37 LMi | 38 LMi | 39 LMi | 40 LMi | 41 LMi | 42 LMi | 43 LMi | 44 LMi | 45 LMi | 46 LMi | 47 LMi | 48 LMi | 49 LMi | 50 LMi | 51 LMi | 52 LMi | 67 Leo | | | | | | | | | | | | | | | | | | | | | | | | | | | | | | | | | | | | | | | | | | | | | | | | | | | | | | | | | | | | | | | | | | | | | | | | | | | | | | | | | | | | | | | | |
| Lep | 1 Lep | ε Lep | ι Lep | κ Lep | μ Lep | λ Lep | ν Lep | 8 Lep | β Lep | 10 Lep | α Lep | 12 Lep | γ Lep | ζ Lep | δ Lep | η Lep | 17 Lep | θ Lep | 19 Lep | | | | | | | | | | | | | | | | | | | | | | | | | | | | | | | | | | | | | | | | | | | | | | | | | | | | | | | | | | | | | | | | | | | | | | | | | | | | | | | | | | | | | | | | | | | | | | | | | | | | | | | | | | | | | | | | | | | | | | | | | | |
| Lib | | 2 Lib | 3 Lib | 4 Lib | 5 Lib | 58 Hya | μ Lib | α^{1} Lib | α^{2} Lib | 10 Lib | 11 Lib | 12 Lib | ξ^{1} Lib | 14 Lib | ξ^{2} Lib | 16 Lib | 17 Lib | 18 Lib | δ Lib | σ Lib | ν Lib | 22 Lib | 23 Lib | ι^{1} Lib | ι^{2} Lib | 26 Lib | β Lib | 28 Lib | ο Lib | 30 Lib | ε Lib | ζ^{1} Lib | 33 Lib | ζ^{3} Lib | ζ^{4} Lib | 36 Lib | 37 Lib | γ Lib | υ Lib | τ Lib | 41 Lib | 42 Lib | κ Lib | η Lib | λ Lib | θ Lib | 47 Lib | 48 Lib | 49 Lib | 50 Lib | ξ Sco (Note: In Scorpius) | | | | | | | | | | | | | | | | | | | | | | | | | | | | | | | | | | | | | | | | | | | | | | | | | | | | | | | | | | | | | | | | | | | | | | | | | | | | | | | | | | | | | | | | | | |
| Lup | 1 Lup | 2 Lup | ψ^{1} Lup | ψ^{2} Lup | χ Lup | | | | | | | | | | | | | | | | | | | | | | | | | | | | | | | | | | | | | | | | | | | | | | | | | | | | | | | | | | | | | | | | | | | | | | | | | | | | | | | | | | | | | | | | | | | | | | | | | | | | | | | | | | | | | | | | | | | | | | | | | | | | | | | | | | | | | | | | |
| Lyn | 1 Lyn | 2 Lyn | 3 Lyn | 4 Lyn | 5 Lyn | 6 Lyn | 7 Lyn | 8 Lyn | 9 Lyn | 10 Lyn | 11 Lyn | 12 Lyn | 13 Lyn | 14 Lyn | 15 Lyn | 16 Lyn | 17 Lyn | 18 Lyn | 19 Lyn | 20 Lyn | 21 Lyn | 22 Lyn | 23 Lyn | 24 Lyn | 25 Lyn | 26 Lyn | 27 Lyn | 28 Lyn | 29 Lyn | 30 Lyn | 31 Lyn | 32 Lyn | 33 Lyn | 34 Lyn | 35 Lyn | 36 Lyn | 37 Lyn | 38 Lyn | 39 Lyn | α Lyn | 41 Lyn | 42 Lyn | 43 Lyn | 44 Lyn | | | | | | | | | | | | | | | | | | | | | | | | | | | | | | | | | | | | | | | | | | | | | | | | | | | | | | | | | | | | | | | | | | | | | | | | | | | | | | | | | | | | | | | | | | | | | | | | | |
| Lyr | κ Lyr | μ Lyr | Vega | ε^{1} Lyr | ε^{2} Lyr | ζ^{1} Lyr | ζ^{2} Lyr | ν^{1} Lyr | ν^{2} Lyr | β Lyr | δ^{1} Lyr | δ^{2} Lyr | 13 Lyr | γ Lyr | λ Lyr | 16 Lyr | 17 Lyr | ι Lyr | 19 Lyr | η Lyr | θ Lyr | | | | | | | | | | | | | | | | | | | | | | | | | | | | | | | | | | | | | | | | | | | | | | | | | | | | | | | | | | | | | | | | | | | | | | | | | | | | | | | | | | | | | | | | | | | | | | | | | | | | | | | | | | | | | | | | | | | | | | | | |
Men
Mic
| Mon | 1 Mon | 2 Mon | 3 Mon | 4 Mon (Note: In Lepus) | γ Mon | 6 Mon | 7 Mon | ε Mon | 9 Mon | 10 Mon | β Mon | 12 Mon | 13 Mon | 14 Mon | 15 Mon | 16 Mon | 17 Mon | 18 Mon | 19 Mon | 20 Mon | 21 Mon | δ Mon | 23 Mon | 24 Mon | 25 Mon | α Mon | 27 Mon | 28 Mon | ζ Mon | 30 Mon | 31 Mon | | | | | | | | | | | | | | | | | | | | | | | | | | | | | | | | | | | | | | | | | | | | | | | | | | | | | | | | | | | | | | | | | | | | | | | | | | | | | | | | | | | | | | | | | | | | | | | | | | | | | | | | | | | | | | |
Mus
Nor
Oct
| Oph | δ Oph | ε Oph | υ Oph | ψ Oph | ρ Oph | | χ Oph | φ Oph | ω Oph | λ Oph | 28 Her (Note: In Hercules) | 12 Oph | ζ Oph | 14 Oph | 15 Oph | 16 Oph | 43 Her | 18 Oph | 19 Oph | 20 Oph | 21 Oph | 22 Oph | 23 Oph | 24 Oph | ι Oph | 26 Oph | κ Oph | 28 Oph | 29 Oph | 30 Oph | 31 Oph | 32 Oph | 33 Oph | 34 Oph | η Oph | 36 Oph | 37 Oph | 38 Oph | ο Oph | ξ Oph | 41 Oph | θ Oph | 43 Oph | 44 Oph | 45 Oph | | 47 Oph | | σ Oph | 50 Oph | 51 Oph | 52 Oph | 53 Oph | 54 Oph | α Oph | 56 Oph | μ Oph | 58 Oph | | β Oph | 61 Oph | γ Oph | 63 Oph (Note: In Sagittarius) | ν Oph | | 66 Oph | 67 Oph | 68 Oph | τ Oph | 70 Oph | 71 Oph | 72 Oph | 73 Oph | 74 Oph | | | | | | | | | | | | | | | | | | | | | | | | | | | | | | | | | | | | | | | | | | | | | | | | | | | | | | | | | | | | | | | | | | | |
| Ori | π^{3} Ori | π^{2} Ori | π^{4} Ori | ο^{1} Ori | 5 Ori | 6 Ori | π^{1} Ori | π^{5} Ori | ο^{2} Ori | π^{6} Ori | 11 Ori | | 13 Ori | 14 Ori | 15 Ori | 16 Ori | ρ Ori | 18 Ori | Rigel | τ Ori | 21 Ori | 22 Ori | 23 Ori | Bellatrix | ψ^{1} Ori | | 27 Ori | η Ori | 29 Ori | ψ^{2} Ori | 31 Ori | 32 Ori | 33 Ori | Mintaka | 35 Ori | υ Ori | φ^{1} Ori | 38 Ori | Meissa | φ^{2} Ori | θ^{1} Ori | 42 Ori | θ^{2} Ori | ι Ori | 45 Ori | Alnilam | ω Ori | σ Ori | 49 Ori | Alnitak | 51 Ori | 52 Ori | Saiph | χ^{1} Ori | 55 Ori | 56 Ori | 57 Ori | Betelgeuse | 59 Ori | 60 Ori | μ Ori | χ^{2} Ori | 63 Ori | 64 Ori | | 66 Ori | ν Ori | 68 Ori | 69 Ori | ξ Ori | 71 Ori | 72 Ori | 73 Ori | 74 Ori | 75 Ori | | 77 Ori (Note: In Monoceros) | 78 Ori | | | | | | | | | | | | | | | | | | | | | | | | | | | | | | | | | | | | | | | | | | | | | | | | | | | | | | | | | | | | | | | |
Pav
| Peg | 1 Peg | 2 Peg | 3 Peg | 4 Peg | 5 Peg | 25 Aqr (Note: In Aquarius) | 7 Peg | ε Peg | 9 Peg | κ Peg | 11 Peg | 12 Peg | 13 Peg | 14 Peg | 15 Peg | 16 Peg | 17 Peg | 18 Peg | 19 Peg | 20 Peg | 21 Peg | ν Peg | 23 Peg | ι Peg | 25 Peg | θ Peg | π^{1} Peg | 28 Peg | π^{2} Peg | 30 Peg | 31 Peg | 32 Peg | 33 Peg | 34 Peg | 35 Peg | 36 Peg | 37 Peg | 38 Peg | 39 Peg | 40 Peg | 41 Peg | ζ Peg | ο Peg | η Peg | 45 Peg | ξ Peg | λ Peg | μ Peg | σ Peg | ρ Peg | 51 Peg | 52 Peg | β Peg | α Peg | 55 Peg | 56 Peg | 57 Peg | 58 Peg | 59 Peg | 60 Peg | 61 Peg | τ Peg | 63 Peg | 64 Peg | 65 Peg | 66 Peg | 67 Peg | υ Peg | 69 Peg | 70 Peg | 71 Peg | 72 Peg | 73 Peg | 74 Peg | 75 Peg | 76 Peg | 77 Peg | 78 Peg | 79 Peg | 80 Peg | φ Peg | 82 Peg | 83 Peg | ψ Peg | 85 Peg | 86 Peg | 87 Peg | γ Peg | χ Peg | | | | | | | | | | | | | | | | | | | | | | | | | | | | | | | | | | | | | | | | | | | | | | | | | | | | |
| Per | 1 Per | 2 Per | 3 Per | 4 Per | 5 Per | 6 Per (Note: In Andromeda) | χ Per | 8 Per | 9 Per | 10 Per | 11 Per | 12 Per | θ Per | 14 Per | η Per | 16 Per | 17 Per | τ Per | | 20 Per | 21 Per | π Per | γ Per | 24 Per | ρ Per | Algol | κ Per | ω Per | 29 Per | 30 Per | 31 Per | 32 Per | α Per | 34 Per | σ per | 36 Per | ψ Per | ο Per | δ Per | 40 Per | ν Per | 42 Per | 43 Per | ζ Per | ε Per | ξ Per | λ Per | 48 Per | 49 Per | 50 Per | μ Per | 52 Per | 53 Per | 54 Per | 55 Per | 56 Per | 57 Per | 58 Per | 59 Per | | | | | | | | | | | | | | | | | | | | | | | | | | | | | | | | | | | | | | | | | | | | | | | | | | | | | | | | | | | | | | | | | | | | | | | | | | | | | | | | | | |
Phe
Pic
| Psc | 1 Psc | 2 Psc | 3 Psc | β Psc | 5 Psc | γ Psc | 7 Psc | 8 Psc | 9 Psc | θ Psc | 11 Psc | 12 Psc | 13 Psc | 14 Psc | 15 Psc | 16 Psc | ι Psc | λ Psc | 19 Psc | 20 Psc | 21 Psc | 22 Psc | 23 Psc | 24 Psc | 25 Psc | 26 Psc | 27 Psc | ω Psc | 29 Psc | 30 Psc | 31 Psc | 32 Psc | 33 Psc | 34 Psc | 35 Psc | 36 Psc | 37 Psc | 38 Psc | 39 Psc | 40 Psc | 41 Psc | 42 Psc | 43 Psc | 44 Psc | 45 Psc | 46 Psc | 47 Psc | 48 Psc | 49 Psc | | 51 Psc | 52 Psc | 53 Psc | 54 Psc | 55 Psc | | 57 Psc | 58 Psc | 59 Psc | 60 Psc | 61 Psc | 62 Psc | δ Psc | 64 Psc | 65 Psc | 66 Psc | 67 Psc | 68 Psc | σ Psc | 70 Psc | ε Psc | 72 Psc | 73 Psc | ψ^{1} Psc | 75 Psc | 76 Psc | 77 Psc | 78 Psc | ψ^{2} Psc | 80 Psc | ψ^{3} Psc | 82 Psc | τ Psc | χ Psc | φ Psc | ζ Psc | 87 Psc | 88 Psc | 89 Psc | υ Psc | 91 Psc | 92 Psc | ρ Psc | 94 Psc | 95 Psc | 96 Psc | 97 Psc | μ Psc | η Psc | 100 Psc | 101 Psc | π Psc | 103 Psc | 104 Psc | 105 Psc | ν Psc | 107 Psc | | 109 Psc | ο Psc | ξ Psc | 112 Psc | α Psc | | | | | | | | | | | | | | | | | | | | | | | | | | | | |
| PsA | γ Mic (Note: In Microscopium) | 2 PsA | 3 PsA | ε Mic | 5 PsA | 6 PsA | 7 PsA | 8 PsA | ι PsA | θ PsA | 11 PsA | η PsA | 13 PsA | μ PsA | τ Psc | λ PsA | β PsA | ε PsA | 19 PsA | 20 PsA | 21 PsA | γ PsA | δ PsA | Fomalhaut | | | | | | | | | | | | | | | | | | | | | | | | | | | | | | | | | | | | | | | | | | | | | | | | | | | | | | | | | | | | | | | | | | | | | | | | | | | | | | | | | | | | | | | | | | | | | | | | | | | | | | | | | | | | | | | | | | | | | |
| Pup | 1 Pup | 2 Pup | 3 Pup | 4 Pup | 5 Pup | 6 Pup | ξ Pup | 8 Pup | 9 Pup | 10 Pup | 11 Pup | 12 Pup | 13 Pup (Note: In Canis Major) | 14 Pup | ρ Pup | 16 Pup | | 18 Pup | 19 Pup | 20 Pup | 21 Pup | 22 Pup | | | | | | | | | | | | | | | | | | | | | | | | | | | | | | | | | | | | | | | | | | | | | | | | | | | | | | | | | | | | | | | | | | | | | | | | | | | | | | | | | | | | | | | | | | | | | | | | | | | | | | | | | | | | | | | | | | | | | | | |
Pyx
Ret
| Sge | 1 Sge | 2 Sge | 3 Sge | ε Sge | α Sge | β Sge | δ Sge | ζ Sge | 9 Sge | 10 Sge | 11 Sge | γ Sge | 13 Sge | 14 Sge (Note: In Aquila) | 15 Sge | η Sge | θ Sge | 18 Sge | | | | | | | | | | | | | | | | | | | | | | | | | | | | | | | | | | | | | | | | | | | | | | | | | | | | | | | | | | | | | | | | | | | | | | | | | | | | | | | | | | | | | | | | | | | | | | | | | | | | | | | | | | | | | | | | | | | | | | | | | | | |
| Sgr | 1 Sgr | 2 Sgr | 3 Sgr | 4 Sgr | 5 Sgr | 6 Sgr | 7 Sgr | | 9 Sgr | γ^{2} Sgr | 11 Sgr | 12 Sgr | μ Sgr | 14 Sgr | 15 Sgr | 16 Sgr | 17 Sgr | 18 Sgr | δ Sgr | ε Sgr | 21 Sgr | λ Sgr | 23 Sgr | 24 Sgr | 25 Sgr | 26 Sgr | φ Sgr | 28 Sgr | 29 Sgr | 30 Sgr | 31 Sgr | ν^{1} Sgr | 33 Sgr | σ Sgr | ν^{2} Sgr | ξ^{1} Sgr | ξ^{2} Sgr | ζ Sgr | ο Sgr | τ Sgr | π Sgr | ψ Sgr | 43 Sgr | ρ^{1} Sgr | ρ^{2} Sgr | υ Sgr | χ^{1} Sgr | χ^{2} Sgr | χ^{3} Sgr | 50 Sgr | 51 Sgr | 52 Sgr | 53 Sgr | 54 Sgr | 55 Sgr | 56 Sgr | 57 Sgr | ω Sgr | 59 Sgr | 60 Sgr | 61 Sgr | 62 Sgr | 63 Sgr | HR 7671 | 65 Sgr | | | | | | | | | | | | | | | | | | | | | | | | | | | | | | | | | | | | | | | | | | | | | | | | | | | | | | | | | | | | | | | | | | | | | | | | | | | | |
| Sco | 1 Sco | 2 Sco | 3 Sco | 4 Sco | ρ Sco | π Sco | δ Sco | β Sco | ω^{1} Sco | ω^{2} Sco | 11 Sco | 12 Sco | 13 Sco | ν Sco | ψ Sco | 16 Sco | χ Sco | 18 Sco | ο Sco | σ Sco | Antares | 22 Sco | τ Sco | 24 Sco | 25 Sco | ε Sco | 27 Sco | 28 Sco | 29 Sco | 36 Oph C | 38 Oph | 32 Sco | 33 Sco | υ Sco | λ Sco | | | | | | | | | | | | | | | | | | | | | | | | | | | | | | | | | | | | | | | | | | | | | | | | | | | | | | | | | | | | | | | | | | | | | | | | | | | | | | | | | | | | | | | | | | | | | | | | | | | | | | | | | | |
Scl
Sct
| Ser | 1 Ser (Note: In Virgo) | 2 Ser | 3 Ser | 4 Ser | 5 Ser | 6 Ser | 7 Ser | 8 Ser | τ^{1} Ser | 10 Ser | 11 Ser | τ^{2} Ser | δ Ser | 14 Ser | τ^{3} Ser | 16 Ser | τ^{4} Ser | τ^{5} Ser | τ^{6} Ser | χ Ser | ι Ser | τ^{7} Ser | ψ Ser | α Ser | 25 Ser | τ^{8} Ser | λ Ser | β Ser | 29 Ser | 30 Ser | υ Ser | μ Ser | | ω Ser | κ Ser | 36 Ser | ε Ser | ρ Ser | 39 Ser | 40 Ser | γ Ser | | 43 Ser | π Ser | 45 Ser | 46 Ser | 47 Ser | 48 Ser | 49 Ser | σ Ser | ω Her (Note: In Hercules; also known as 24 Herculis) | | ν Ser | | ξ Ser | ο Ser | ζ Ser | η Ser | 59 Ser | 60 Ser | 61 Ser | 62 Ser | θ Ser | 64 Ser | | | | | | | | | | | | | | | | | | | | | | | | | | | | | | | | | | | | | | | | | | | | | | | | | | | | | | | | | | | | | | | | | | | | | | | | | | | | | |
| Sex | 10 Leo | 2 Sex | 3 Sex | 4 Sex | 5 Sex | 6 Sex | 7 Sex | γ Sex | 9 Sex | 10 Sex | 11 Sex | 12 Sex | 13 Sex | 14 Sex | α Sex | 16 Sex | 17 Sex | 18 Sex | 19 Sex | 20 Sex | 21 Sex | ε Sex | 23 Sex | 24 Sex | 25 Sex | 26 Sex | 27 Sex | | δ Sex | β Sex | 31 Sex | 32 Sex | 33 Sex | 34 Sex | 35 Sex | 36 Sex | 37 Sex | 38 Sex | 39 Sex | 40 Sex | 41 Sex | | | | | | | | | | | | | | | | | | | | | | | | | | | | | | | | | | | | | | | | | | | | | | | | | | | | | | | | | | | | | | | | | | | | | | | | | | | | | | | | | | | | | | | | | | | | | | | | | | | | |
| Tau | ο Tau | ξ Tau | | 4 Tau | 5 Tau | 6 Tau | 7 Tau | | 9 Tau | 10 Tau | 11 Tau | 12 Tau | 13 Tau | 14 Tau | | Celaeno | Electra | 18 Tau | Taygeta | Maia | Asterope A | Asterope B | Merope | 24 Tau | Alcyone | 26 Tau | Atlas | Pleione | 29 Tau | 30 Tau | 31 Tau | 32 Tau | 33 Tau | (Uranus) | λ Tau | 36 Tau | 37 Tau | ν Tau | 39 Tau | 40 Tau | 41 Tau | ψ Tau | ω^{1} Tau | 44 Tau | 45 Tau | 46 Tau | 47 Tau | 48 Tau | μ Tau | ω^{2} Tau | 51 Tau | φ Tau | 53 Tau | γ Tau | 55 Tau | 56 Tau | 57 Tau | 58 Tau | χ Tau | 60 Tau | δ^{1} Tau | 62 Tau | 63 Tau | δ^{2} Tau | κ^{1} Tau | 66 Tau | κ^{2} Tau | δ^{3} Tau | υ Tau | 70 Tau | 71 Tau | 72 Tau | π Tau | ε Tau | 75 Tau | 76 Tau | θ^{1} Tau | θ^{2} Tau | 79 Tau | 80 Tau | 81 Tau | | 83 Tau | 84 Tau | 85 Tau | ρ Tau | Aldebaran | 88 Tau | 89 Tau | 90 Tau | σ^{1} Tau | σ^{2} Tau | 93 Tau | τ Tau | 95 Tau | 96 Tau | 97 Tau | 98 Tau | 99 Tau | | 101 Tau | ι Tau | 103 Tau | 104 Tau | 105 Tau | 106 Tau | 107 Tau | 108 Tau | 109 Tau | 110 Tau | 111 Tau | β Tau | 113 Tau | 114 Tau | 115 Tau | 116 Tau | 117 Tau | 118 Tau | 119 Tau | 120 Tau | 121 Tau | 122 Tau | ζ Tau | | 125 Tau | 126 Tau | 127 Tau | 128 Tau | 129 Tau | 130 Tau | 131 Tau | 132 Tau | 133 Tau | 134 Tau | 135 Tau | 136 Tau | 137 Tau | | 139 Tau | 140 Tau | 141 Tau |
Tel
| Tri | 1 Tri | α Tri | ε Tri | β Tri | 5 Tri | ι Tri | 7 Tri | δ Tri | γ Tri | 10 Tri | 11 Tri | 12 Tri | 13 Tri | 14 Tri | 15 Tri | HR 830 | | | | | | | | | | | | | | | | | | | | | | | | | | | | | | | | | | | | | | | | | | | | | | | | | | | | | | | | | | | | | | | | | | | | | | | | | | | | | | | | | | | | | | | | | | | | | | | | | | | | | | | | | | | | | | | | | | | | | | | | | | | | | |
TrA
Tuc
| UMa | ο UMa | 2 UMa | π^{1} UMa | 4 UMa | 5 UMa | 6 UMa | | ρ UMa | ι UMa | 10 UMa | σ^{1} UMa | κ UMa | σ^{2} UMa | τ UMa | 15 UMa | 16 UMa | 17 UMa | 18 UMa | 19 UMa | 20 UMa | 21 UMa | 22 UMa | 23 UMa | 24 UMa | θ UMa | 26 UMa | 27 UMa | 28 UMa | υ UMa | φ UMa | 31 Uma | 32 UMa | λ UMa | μ UMa | 35 UMa | 36 UMa | 37 UMa | 38 UMa | 39 UMa | 40 UMa | 41 UMa | 42 UMa | 43 UMa | 44 UMa | ω UMa | 46 UMa | 47 UMa | β UMa | 49 UMa | α UMa | 51 UMa | ψ UMa | ξ UMa | ν UMa | 55 UMa | 56 UMa | 57 UMa | 58 UMa | 59 UMa | 60 UMa | 61 UMa | 62 UMa | χ UMa | γ UMa | 65 UMa | 66 UMa | 67 UMa | 68 UMa | δ UMa | 70 UMa | 71 UMa | 72 UMa | 73 UMa | 74 UMa | 75 UMa | 76 UMa | ε UMa | 78 UMa | Mizar | Alcor | 81 UMa | 82 UMa | 83 UMa | 84 UMa | η UMa | 86 UMa | 10 Dra (Note: In Draco) | | | | | | | | | | | | | | | | | | | | | | | | | | | | | | | | | | | | | | | | | | | | | | | | | | | | | | |
| UMi | Polaris | 2 UMi | 3 UMi | 4 UMi | 5 UMi | 6 UMi | β UMi | 8 UMi | 9 UMi | 10 UMi | 11 UMi | 12 UMi | γ UMi | 14 UMi | θ UMi | ζ UMi | 17 UMi | π^{2} UMi | 19 UMi | 20 UMi | η UMi | ε UMi | δ UMi | 24 UMi | | | | | | | | | | | | | | | | | | | | | | | | | | | | | | | | | | | | | | | | | | | | | | | | | | | | | | | | | | | | | | | | | | | | | | | | | | | | | | | | | | | | | | | | | | | | | | | | | | | | | | | | | | | | | | | | | | | | | |
Vel
| Vir | ω Vir | ξ Vir | ν Vir | 4 Vir | β Vir | 6 Vir | 7 Vir | π Vir | ο Vir | 10 Vir | 11 Vir | 12 Vir | 13 Vir | 14 Vir | η Vir | 16 Vir | 17 Vir | | | 20 Vir | 21 Vir | | | | 25 Vir | χ Vir | 27 Vir | 28 Vir | γ Vir | ρ Vir | 31 Vir | 32 Vir | 33 Vir | 34 Vir | 35 Vir | 29 Com | 37 Vir | 38 Vir | 39 Vir | ψ Vir | 41 Vir | | δ Vir | 44 Vir | | 46 Vir | ε Vir | 48 Vir | 49 Vir | 50 Vir | θ Vir | | 53 Vir | 54 Vir | 55 Vir | 56 Vir | 57 Vir | 58 Vir | 59 Vir | σ Vir | 61 Vir | 62 Vir | 63 Vir | 64 Vir | 65 Vir | 66 Vir | Spica | 68 Vir | 69 Vir | 70 Vir | 71 Vir | 72 Vir | 73 Vir | 74 Vir | 75 Vir | 76 Vir | 77 Vir | 78 Vir | ζ Vir | 80 Vir | 81 Vir | 82 Vir | 83 Vir | 84 Vir | 85 Vir | 86 Vir | 87 Vir | 88 Vir | 89 Vir | 90 Vir | | 92 Vir | τ Vir | 94 Vir | 95 Vir | 96 Vir | 97 Vir | κ Vir | ι Vir | λ Vir | 101 Vir (Note: In Boötes) | υ Vir | 103 Vir | 104 Vir | φ Vir | 106 Vir | μ Vir | 108 Vir | 109 Vir | 110 Vir | | | | | | | | | | | | | | | | | | | | | | | | | | | | | | | |
Vol
| Vul | 1 Vul | 2 Vul | 3 Vul | 4 Vul | 5 Vul | α Vul | 7 Vul | 8 Vul | 9 Vul | 10 Vul | CK Vul | 12 Vul | 13 Vul | 14 Vul | 15 Vul | 16 Vul | 17 Vul | 18 Vul | 19 Vul | 20 Vul | 21 Vul | 22 Vul | 23 Vul | 24 Vul | 25 Vul | 26 Vul | 27 Vul | 28 Vul | 29 Vul | 30 Vul | 31 Vul | 32 Vul | 33 Vul | 34 Vul | 35 Vul | | | | | | | | | | | | | | | | | | | | | | | | | | | | | | | | | | | | | | | | | | | | | | | | | | | | | | | | | | | | | | | | | | | | | | | | | | | | | | | | | | | | | | | | | | | | | | | | | | | | | | | | | | |

== See also ==
- List of constellations
- Table of stars with Bayer designations
