= Auriga in Chinese astronomy =

Constellation

The modern constellation Auriga lies across two of the quadrants symbolized by the White Tiger of the West (西方白虎, Xī Fāng Bái Hǔ) and the Vermillion Bird of the South (南方朱雀, Nán Fāng Zhū Què), and Three Enclosures (三垣, Sān Yuán), that divide the sky in traditional Chinese uranography.

The name of the western constellation in modern Chinese is 御夫座 (yù fū zuò), meaning "the driving man constellation".

== Stars ==
The map of Chinese constellation in constellation Auriga area consists of :

Four Symbols	Mansion (Chinese name)	Romanization	Translation	Asterisms (Chinese name)	Romanization	Translation	Western star name	Proper Name	Chinese star name	Romanization	Translation
Three Enclosures (三垣)	紫微垣	Zǐ Wēi Yuán	Purple Forbidden enclosure	八穀	Bāgǔ	Eight Kinds of Crops					
Three Enclosures (三垣)	紫微垣	Zǐ Wēi Yuán	Purple Forbidden enclosure	八穀	Bāgǔ	Eight Kinds of Crops	δ Aur	Bagu	八穀一	Bāgǔyī	1st star
Three Enclosures (三垣)	紫微垣	Zǐ Wēi Yuán	Purple Forbidden enclosure	八穀	Bāgǔ	Eight Kinds of Crops	ξ Aur		八穀二	Bāgǔèr	2nd star
Three Enclosures (三垣)	紫微垣	Zǐ Wēi Yuán	Purple Forbidden enclosure	八穀	Bāgǔ	Eight Kinds of Crops	9 Aur		八穀六	Bāgǔliù	6th star
Three Enclosures (三垣)	紫微垣	Zǐ Wēi Yuán	Purple Forbidden enclosure	八穀	Bāgǔ	Eight Kinds of Crops	HD 40062		八谷增五	Bāgǔzēngwǔ	5th additional star
Three Enclosures (三垣)	紫微垣	Zǐ Wēi Yuán	Purple Forbidden enclosure	八穀	Bāgǔ	Eight Kinds of Crops	45 Aur		八谷增三十四	Bāgǔzēngsānshíwǔ	35th additional star
White Tiger of the West (西方白虎)	畢	Bì	Net	五車	Wǔchē	Five Chariots					
White Tiger of the West (西方白虎)	畢	Bì	Net	五車	Wǔchē	Five Chariots	ι Aur	Hassaleh			
White Tiger of the West (西方白虎)	畢	Bì	Net	五車	Wǔchē	Five Chariots	ι Aur	Hassaleh	五車一	Wǔchēyī	1st star
White Tiger of the West (西方白虎)	畢	Bì	Net	五車	Wǔchē	Five Chariots	ι Aur	Hassaleh	五帝车一	Wǔdìchēyī	First king chariot
White Tiger of the West (西方白虎)	畢	Bì	Net	五車	Wǔchē	Five Chariots	ι Aur	Hassaleh	五車西南星	Wǔchēxīnánxīng	Southwestern star
White Tiger of the West (西方白虎)	畢	Bì	Net	五車	Wǔchē	Five Chariots	α Aur	Capella			
White Tiger of the West (西方白虎)	畢	Bì	Net	五車	Wǔchē	Five Chariots	α Aur	Capella	五車二	Wǔchēèr	2nd star
White Tiger of the West (西方白虎)	畢	Bì	Net	五車	Wǔchē	Five Chariots	α Aur	Capella	天庫	Tiānkù	Celestial warehouse
White Tiger of the West (西方白虎)	畢	Bì	Net	五車	Wǔchē	Five Chariots	α Aur	Capella	五車西北星	Wǔchēxīběixīng	Northwestern star
White Tiger of the West (西方白虎)	畢	Bì	Net	五車	Wǔchē	Five Chariots	α Aur	Capella	五車大星	Wǔchēdàxīng	Main star
White Tiger of the West (西方白虎)	畢	Bì	Net	五車	Wǔchē	Five Chariots	α Aur	Capella	五帝车二	Wǔdìchēèr	Second king chariot
White Tiger of the West (西方白虎)	畢	Bì	Net	五車	Wǔchē	Five Chariots	β Aur	Menkalinan			
White Tiger of the West (西方白虎)	畢	Bì	Net	五車	Wǔchē	Five Chariots	β Aur	Menkalinan	五車三	Wǔchēsān	3rd star
White Tiger of the West (西方白虎)	畢	Bì	Net	五車	Wǔchē	Five Chariots	β Aur	Menkalinan	五車东北星	Wǔchēdōngběixīng	Northeastern star
White Tiger of the West (西方白虎)	畢	Bì	Net	五車	Wǔchē	Five Chariots	β Aur	Menkalinan	五帝车三	Wǔdìchēsān	Third king chariot
White Tiger of the West (西方白虎)	畢	Bì	Net	五車	Wǔchē	Five Chariots	θ Aur	Mahasim (for component A)			
White Tiger of the West (西方白虎)	畢	Bì	Net	五車	Wǔchē	Five Chariots	θ Aur	Mahasim (for component A)	五車四	Wǔchēsì	4th star
White Tiger of the West (西方白虎)	畢	Bì	Net	五車	Wǔchē	Five Chariots	θ Aur	Mahasim (for component A)	五車北中星	Wǔchēdōngzhōngxīng	Northern and central star
White Tiger of the West (西方白虎)	畢	Bì	Net	五車	Wǔchē	Five Chariots	θ Aur	Mahasim (for component A)	五帝车四	Wǔdìchēsì	Fourth king chariot
White Tiger of the West (西方白虎)	畢	Bì	Net	五車	Wǔchē	Five Chariots	6 Aur		五车增四	Wǔchēzēngsì	4th additional star
White Tiger of the West (西方白虎)	畢	Bì	Net	五車	Wǔchē	Five Chariots	5 Aur		五车增五	Wǔchēzēngwǔ	5th additional star
White Tiger of the West (西方白虎)	畢	Bì	Net	五車	Wǔchē	Five Chariots	ω Aur		五车增六	Wǔchēzēngliù	6th additional star
White Tiger of the West (西方白虎)	畢	Bì	Net	五車	Wǔchē	Five Chariots	1 Aur		五车增七	Wǔchēzēngqī	7th additional star
White Tiger of the West (西方白虎)	畢	Bì	Net	五車	Wǔchē	Five Chariots	2 Aur		五车增八	Wǔchēzēngbā	8th additional star
White Tiger of the West (西方白虎)	畢	Bì	Net	五車	Wǔchē	Five Chariots	40 Aur		五车增九	Wǔchēzēngjiǔ	9th additional star
White Tiger of the West (西方白虎)	畢	Bì	Net	五車	Wǔchē	Five Chariots	38 Aur		五车增十	Wǔchēzēngshí	10th additional star
White Tiger of the West (西方白虎)	畢	Bì	Net	五車	Wǔchē	Five Chariots	39 Aur		五车增十一	Wǔchēzēngshíyī	11th additional star
White Tiger of the West (西方白虎)	畢	Bì	Net	五車	Wǔchē	Five Chariots	43 Aur		五车增十二	Wǔchēzēngshíèr	12th additional star
White Tiger of the West (西方白虎)	畢	Bì	Net	五車	Wǔchē	Five Chariots	42 Aur		五车增十三	Wǔchēzēngshísān	13th additional star
White Tiger of the West (西方白虎)	畢	Bì	Net	五車	Wǔchē	Five Chariots	41 Aur		五车增十四	Wǔchēzēngshísì	14th additional star
White Tiger of the West (西方白虎)	畢	Bì	Net	五車	Wǔchē	Five Chariots	36 Aur		五车增十五	Wǔchēzēngshíwǔ	15th additional star
White Tiger of the West (西方白虎)	畢	Bì	Net	五車	Wǔchē	Five Chariots	π Aur		五车增十六	Wǔchēzēngshíliù	16th additional star
White Tiger of the West (西方白虎)	畢	Bì	Net	五車	Wǔchē	Five Chariots	ο Aur		五车增十七	Wǔchēzēngshíqī	17th additional star
White Tiger of the West (西方白虎)	畢	Bì	Net	五車	Wǔchē	Five Chariots	12 Aur		五车增十八	Wǔchēzēngshíbā	18th additional star
White Tiger of the West (西方白虎)	畢	Bì	Net	柱	Zhù	Pillars					
White Tiger of the West (西方白虎)	畢	Bì	Net	柱	Zhù	Pillars	ε Aur	Almaaz (for component A)			
White Tiger of the West (西方白虎)	畢	Bì	Net	柱	Zhù	Pillars	ε Aur	Almaaz (for component A)	柱一	Zhùyī	1st star
White Tiger of the West (西方白虎)	畢	Bì	Net	柱	Zhù	Pillars	ε Aur	Almaaz (for component A)	西北柱	Xīběizhù	Northwestern pillar
White Tiger of the West (西方白虎)	畢	Bì	Net	柱	Zhù	Pillars	ζ Aur	Saclateni (for component A)	柱二	Zhǔèr	2nd star
White Tiger of the West (西方白虎)	畢	Bì	Net	柱	Zhù	Pillars	η Aur	Haedus	柱三	Zhǔsān	3rd star
White Tiger of the West (西方白虎)	畢	Bì	Net	柱	Zhù	Pillars	υ Aur		柱四	Zhǔsì	4th star
White Tiger of the West (西方白虎)	畢	Bì	Net	柱	Zhù	Pillars	ν Aur		柱五	Zhǔwu	5th star
White Tiger of the West (西方白虎)	畢	Bì	Net	柱	Zhù	Pillars	τ Aur		柱六	Zhǔliù	6th star
White Tiger of the West (西方白虎)	畢	Bì	Net	柱	Zhù	Pillars	χ Aur		柱七	Zhǔqī	7th star
White Tiger of the West (西方白虎)	畢	Bì	Net	柱	Zhù	Pillars	26 Aur		柱八	Zhǔbā	8th star
White Tiger of the West (西方白虎)	畢	Bì	Net	天潢	Tiānhuáng	Celestial Pond					
White Tiger of the West (西方白虎)	畢	Bì	Net	天潢	Tiānhuáng	Celestial Pond	19 Aur		天潢一	Tiānguāngyī	1st star
White Tiger of the West (西方白虎)	畢	Bì	Net	天潢	Tiānhuáng	Celestial Pond	φ Aur		天潢二	Tiānguāngèr	2nd star
White Tiger of the West (西方白虎)	畢	Bì	Net	天潢	Tiānhuáng	Celestial Pond	14 Aur		天潢三	Tiānguāngsān	3rd star
White Tiger of the West (西方白虎)	畢	Bì	Net	天潢	Tiānhuáng	Celestial Pond	σ Aur		天潢四	Tiānguāngsì	4th star
White Tiger of the West (西方白虎)	畢	Bì	Net	天潢	Tiānhuáng	Celestial Pond	μ Aur		天潢五	Tiānguāngwu	5th star
White Tiger of the West (西方白虎)	畢	Bì	Net	天潢	Tiānhuáng	Celestial Pond	16 Aur		天潢增一	Tiānguāngzēngyī	1st additional star
White Tiger of the West (西方白虎)	畢	Bì	Net	天潢	Tiānhuáng	Celestial Pond	AR Aur		天潢增二	Tiānguāngzēngèr	2nd additional star
White Tiger of the West (西方白虎)	畢	Bì	Net	咸池	Xiánchí	Pool of Harmony					
White Tiger of the West (西方白虎)	畢	Bì	Net	咸池	Xiánchí	Pool of Harmony	ρ Aur		咸池一	Xiánchíyī	1st star
White Tiger of the West (西方白虎)	畢	Bì	Net	咸池	Xiánchí	Pool of Harmony	HD 36041		咸池二	Xiánchíèr	2nd star
White Tiger of the West (西方白虎)	畢	Bì	Net	咸池	Xiánchí	Pool of Harmony	λ Aur		咸池三	Xiánchísān	3rd star
White Tiger of the West (西方白虎)	觜	Zī	Turtle Beak	座旗	Zuòqí	Seat Flags					
White Tiger of the West (西方白虎)	觜	Zī	Turtle Beak	座旗	Zuòqí	Seat Flags	ψ^{6} Aur		座旗一	Zuòqíyī	1st star
White Tiger of the West (西方白虎)	觜	Zī	Turtle Beak	座旗	Zuòqí	Seat Flags	ψ^{4} Aur		座旗三	Zuòqísān	3rd star
White Tiger of the West (西方白虎)	觜	Zī	Turtle Beak	座旗	Zuòqí	Seat Flags	ψ^{5} Aur		座旗四	Zuòqísì	4th star
White Tiger of the West (西方白虎)	觜	Zī	Turtle Beak	座旗	Zuòqí	Seat Flags	ψ^{2} Aur		座旗五	Zuòqíwu	5th star
White Tiger of the West (西方白虎)	觜	Zī	Turtle Beak	座旗	Zuòqí	Seat Flags	ψ^{7} Aur		座旗六	Zuòqíliù	6th star
White Tiger of the West (西方白虎)	觜	Zī	Turtle Beak	座旗	Zuòqí	Seat Flags	ψ^{3} Aur		座旗七	Zuòqíqī	7th star
White Tiger of the West (西方白虎)	觜	Zī	Turtle Beak	座旗	Zuòqí	Seat Flags	51 Aur		座旗八	Zuòqíbā	8th star
White Tiger of the West (西方白虎)	觜	Zī	Turtle Beak	座旗	Zuòqí	Seat Flags	ψ^{8} Aur		座旗九	Zuòqíjiǔ	9th star
White Tiger of the West (西方白虎)	觜	Zī	Turtle Beak	座旗	Zuòqí	Seat Flags	ψ^{1} Aur		座旗增一	Zuòqízēngyī	1st additional star
White Tiger of the West (西方白虎)	觜	Zī	Turtle Beak	座旗	Zuòqí	Seat Flags	47 Aur		座旗增二	Zuòqízēngèr	2nd additional star
White Tiger of the West (西方白虎)	觜	Zī	Turtle Beak	座旗	Zuòqí	Seat Flags	60 Aur		座旗增三	Zuòqízēngsān	3rd additional star
White Tiger of the West (西方白虎)	觜	Zī	Turtle Beak	座旗	Zuòqí	Seat Flags	62 Aur		座旗增五	Zuòqízēngwǔ	5th additional star
White Tiger of the West (西方白虎)	觜	Zī	Turtle Beak	座旗	Zuòqí	Seat Flags	63 Aur		座旗增六	Zuòqízēngliù	6th additional star
White Tiger of the West (西方白虎)	觜	Zī	Turtle Beak	座旗	Zuòqí	Seat Flags	64 Aur		座旗增七	Zuòqízēngqī	7th additional star
White Tiger of the West (西方白虎)	觜	Zī	Turtle Beak	座旗	Zuòqí	Seat Flags	66 Aur		座旗增八	Zuòqízēngbā	8th additional star
Vermilion Bird of the South (南方朱雀)	井	Jǐng	Well	井	Jǐng	Well					
Vermilion Bird of the South (南方朱雀)	井	Jǐng	Well	井	Jǐng	Well	κ Aur		井宿增一	Jǐngsùzēngyī	1st additional star
Vermilion Bird of the South (南方朱雀)	井	Jǐng	Well	井	Jǐng	Well	RT Aur		井宿增二	Jǐngsùzēngèr	2nd additional star
Vermilion Bird of the South (南方朱雀)	井	Jǐng	Well	井	Jǐng	Well	53 Aur		井宿增三	Jǐngsùzēngsān	3rd additional star
Vermilion Bird of the South (南方朱雀)	井	Jǐng	Well	井	Jǐng	Well	54 Aur		井宿增五	Jǐngsùzēngwǔ	5th additional star
Vermilion Bird of the South (南方朱雀)	井	Jǐng	Well	井	Jǐng	Well	49 Aur		井宿增六	Jǐngsùzēngliù	6th additional star
Vermilion Bird of the South (南方朱雀)	井	Jǐng	Well	積水	Jīshuǐ	Accumulated Water	65 Aur		積水	Jīshuǐ	(One star of)

== See also ==
- Traditional Chinese star names
- Chinese constellations
- List of constellations by area
- Star-forming regions of Auriga
