= 28 Aurigae =

G-type giant star in the constellation Auriga

Observation data Epoch J2000 Equinox ICRS
- Constellation: Auriga
- Right ascension: 05^{h} 48^{m} 51.819^{s}
- Declination: +39° 32′ 01.02″
- Apparent magnitude (V): 6.8

Characteristics
- Spectral type: G1 III-IV
- Apparent magnitude (G): 6.59
- U−B color index: +0.41
- B−V color index: +0.81

Astrometry
Radial velocity (R_{v})	15.15±1.00 km/s
Proper motion (μ)	RA: 0.189±0.035 mas/yr Dec.: −26.013±0.022 mas/yr
Parallax (π)	5.2120±0.0306 mas
Distance	626 ± 4 ly (192 ± 1 pc)
Absolute magnitude (M_{V})	+0.32

Details
Mass	1.6 M_{☉}
Radius	10.3 R_{☉}
Luminosity	74 L_{☉}
Surface gravity (log g)	3.45 cgs
Temperature	5,443 K
Metallicity [Fe/H]	−0.16 dex
Age	500 Myr

Other designations
- BD+39°1416, HD 38604, HIP 27458, SAO 58460, Gaia DR3 191509366212532352

Database references
SIMBAD	data

28 Aurigae (28 Aur) is a star in the constellation Auriga. Its apparent magnitude is 6.80. It is a giant star which has exhausted its core hydrogen and expanded to ten times the size of the Sun. Despite being slightly cooler than the sun at 5,443 K it is 74 times more luminous. It is located about 626 ly away.

28 Aurigae is one of the few faint Flamsteed stars which is not in the Bright Star Catalogue. It is included in the Hipparcos catalogue and its parallax was calculated to be 4.99±0.57 mas. Its Gaia Data Release 3 parallax is larger and more precise at 5.2120±0.0306
