= 1 Canis Minoris =

Star in the constellation Canis Minor

- Location of 1 Canis Minoris (circled in red)

Observation data Epoch J2000.0 Equinox J2000.0 (ICRS)
- Constellation: Canis Minor
- Right ascension: 07^{h} 24^{m} 58.18002^{s}
- Declination: +11° 40′ 10.2825″
- Apparent magnitude (V): 5.37

Characteristics
- Evolutionary stage: main sequence
- Spectral type: A5 IV or A4 V
- B−V color index: 0.105±0.006

Astrometry
Radial velocity (R_{v})	−1.0±4.2 km/s
Proper motion (μ)	RA: −15.574 mas/yr Dec.: −15.478 mas/yr
Parallax (π)	10.9796±0.0959 mas
Distance	297 ± 3 ly (91.1 ± 0.8 pc)
Absolute magnitude (M_{V})	0.44

Details
Mass	2.02 M_{☉}
Radius	3.28 R_{☉}
Luminosity	44 L_{☉}
Surface gravity (log g)	3.71 cgs
Temperature	8,222 K
Rotational velocity (v sin i)	159 km/s
Age	716 Myr

Other designations
- 1 CMi, BD+11°1578, GC 9891, HD 58187, HIP 35987, HR 2820, SAO 96871

Database references
SIMBAD	data

1 Canis Minoris is a single star in the equatorial constellation of Canis Minor, located about 287 light years away from the Sun. It is visible to the naked eye as a faint, white-hued star with an apparent visual magnitude of 5.37. The radial velocity of this object is poorly constrained at −1.0±4.2 km/s.

Cowley et al. (1969) listed a stellar classification of A5 IV for 1 Canis Minoris, matching an A-type subgiant star that has exhausted the hydrogen at its core and is evolving into a giant. However, Gray and Garrison (1989) catalogued it as an A-type main-sequence star with a class of A4 V. The Hipparcos team used a class of A3 Vn, where the 'n' indicates "nebulous" lines due to rapid rotation.

This star is estimated to be 716 million years old and is at or near the end of its main sequence lifetime. It has a high rate of spin, showing a projected rotational velocity of 159 km/s. The star has more than double the mass of the Sun with about 3.3 times the Sun's radius. It is radiating 44 times the Sun's luminosity from its photosphere at an effective temperature of 8,222 K.
