= 40 Aquarii =

Star in the constellation Aquarius

Observation data Epoch J2000 Equinox ICRS
- Constellation: Aquarius
- Right ascension: 22^{h} 13^{m} 26.37997^{s}
- Declination: −11° 55′ 34.0405″
- Apparent magnitude (V): 6.93

Characteristics
- Spectral type: G5 IV
- B−V color index: +0.762±0.008

Astrometry
Radial velocity (R_{v})	−2.9±0.3 km/s
Proper motion (μ)	RA: +20.95 mas/yr Dec.: −20.05 mas/yr
Parallax (π)	4.4915±0.0371 mas
Distance	726 ± 6 ly (223 ± 2 pc)
Absolute magnitude (M_{V})	−0.47

Details
Radius	10.07+0.44 −0.21 R_{☉}
Luminosity	154.44 L_{☉}
Surface gravity (log g)	2.69 cgs
Temperature	5,355±80 K
Metallicity [Fe/H]	−0.13 dex
Age	100 Myr

Other designations
- 40 Aqr, BD−12°6209, HD 210845, HIP 109720, SAO 164935

Database references
SIMBAD	data

40 Aquarii is a star in the equatorial constellation of Aquarius. 40 Aquarii is its Flamsteed designation; it was too faint to be included in the Bright Star Catalogue. The brightness of this star is below the normal limit for visibility with the naked eye, having an apparent visual magnitude of 6.93. Based upon parallax measurements, it is located about 726 light-years (223 parsecs) away from the Sun. It is moving closer to the Earth with a heliocentric radial velocity of -3 km/s. 40 Aquarii is positioned near the ecliptic and thus is subject to lunar occultations.

The stellar classification for 40 Aquarii is G5 IV, matching a G-type, yellow-hued subgiant star that has exhausted the supply of hydrogen at its core and has begun to evolve into a giant. It is around 100 million years old with 10 times the girth of the Sun. The star is radiating 154 times the luminosity of the Sun from its photosphere at an effective temperature of 5,355 K.
