= Rho Aurigae =

Binary star system in the constellation Auriga

ρ Aurigae
- Location of ρ Aurigae (circled)

Observation data Epoch J2000 Equinox ICRS
- Constellation: Auriga
- Right ascension: 05^{h} 21^{m} 48.417^{s}
- Declination: +41° 48′ 16.46″
- Apparent magnitude (V): +5.22

Characteristics
- Evolutionary stage: main sequence
- Spectral type: B5 V
- U−B color index: −0.57
- B−V color index: −0.14

Astrometry
Radial velocity (R_{v})	+16.3±2.2 km/s
Proper motion (μ)	RA: +15.053 mas/yr Dec.: −37.695 mas/yr
Parallax (π)	5.2029±0.1327 mas
Distance	630 ± 20 ly (192 ± 5 pc)

Orbit
Period (P)	34.49321±0.00057 d
Eccentricity (e)	0.104±0.019
Periastron epoch (T)	47962.5±2.0 JD
Argument of periastron (ω) (secondary)	3.4±12.0°
Semi-amplitude (K_{1}) (primary)	39.8±0.8 km/s

Details

ρ Aur A
Mass	5–7 M_{☉}
Radius	3.2–3.4 R_{☉}
Rotational velocity (v sin i)	55 km/s

ρ Aur B
Mass	2–4 M_{☉}

Other designations
- ρ Aurigae, 20 Aurigae, BD+41 1162, FK5 2400, GC 6556, HD 34759, HIP 25048, HR 1749, SAO 40269, PPM 48030

Database references
SIMBAD	data

Rho Aurigae is a binary star system in the northern constellation of Auriga. Its name is a Bayer designation that is Latinized from ρ Aurigae, and abbreviated Rho Aur or ρ Aur. This system is faintly visible to the naked eye with an apparent visual magnitude of +5.22. Judging by parallax measurements, this system is approximately 630 light-years (190 parsecs) distant from the Earth, give or take a 20-light-year margin of error. It is drifting further away from the Sun with a radial velocity of +16 km/s.

ρ Aurigae is a single-lined spectroscopic binary system; the presence of a companion object is revealed by shifts in the stellar spectrum. The pair orbit each other with a period of 34.49 days and an orbital eccentricity of 0.10.

The primary component of this system is a B-type main-sequence star defined as a standard star for the stellar classification of B5 V. The deduced mass of the secondary and the lack of evidence for it in the spectrum suggest it may be a B- or A-type star somewhat less luminous than the primary.

== Name ==
In Chinese, 咸池 (Xián Chí), meaning Pool of Harmony, refers to an asterism consisting of ρ Aurigae, λ Aurigae and HD 36041. Consequently, the Chinese name for ρ Aurigae itself is 咸池一 (Xián Chí yī, English: the First Star of Pool of Harmony).
