= AR Aurigae =

Triple star system in the constellation Auriga

- Location of AR Aurigae (circled in red)

Observation data Epoch J2000 Equinox ICRS
- Constellation: Auriga
- Right ascension: 05^{h} 18^{m} 18.896^{s}
- Declination: +33° 46′ 02.52″
- Apparent magnitude (V): 6.144

Characteristics
- Evolutionary stage: Main sequence
- Spectral type: B9V + B9.5V + M
- U−B color index: −0.18
- B−V color index: −0.06
- Variable type: Eclipsing

Astrometry
Radial velocity (R_{v})	28.65±0.09 km/s
Proper motion (μ)	RA: +15.254 mas/yr Dec.: −29.225 mas/yr
Parallax (π)	7.0735±0.0461 mas
Distance	461 ± 3 ly (141.4 ± 0.9 pc)
Absolute magnitude (M_{V})	1.11/1.17

Orbit
Primary	AR Aur A
Name	AR Aur B
Period (P)	4.134581 days
Semi-major axis (a)	0.08564±0.00018 AU
Inclination (i)	88.6000±0.0072°
Semi-amplitude (K_{1}) (primary)	108.36±0.18 km/s
Semi-amplitude (K_{2}) (secondary)	116.92±0.17 km/s

Orbit
Primary	AR Aur AB
Name	AR Aur C
Period (P)	23.365±0.090 years
Semi-major axis (a)	14.351 ± 0.042 AU
Eccentricity (e)	0.268±0.022
Inclination (i)	88.510°
Argument of periastron (ω) (secondary)	13.4±4.6°

Details

AR Aur A
Mass	2.5444±0.0086 M_{☉}
Radius	1.8433±0.0022 R_{☉}
Luminosity	44.1+2.5 −2.4 L_{☉}
Surface gravity (log g)	4.3125±0.0008 cgs
Temperature	10,950±150 K
Rotational velocity (v sin i)	22.555±0.027 km/s
Age	33±3 Myr

AR Aur B
Mass	2.3581±0.0085 M_{☉}
Radius	1.7658±0.0026 R_{☉}
Luminosity	32.2+1.9 −1.8 L_{☉}
Surface gravity (log g)	4.3169±0.0011 cgs
Temperature	10,350±150 K
Rotational velocity (v sin i)	21.604±0.032 km/s
Age	33±3 Myr

AR Aur C
Mass	0.5122±0.0087 M_{☉}

Other designations
- 17 Aur, BD+33°1002, HD 34364, HIP 24740, HR 1728, SAO 57858, PPM 70158

Database references
SIMBAD	data

AR Aurigae (AR Aur), also known by its Flamsteed designation 17 Aurigae, is a triple star in the constellation Auriga. Based on parallax measurements made by the Gaia spacecraft, it is approximately 461 light-years from Earth.

== Characteristics ==
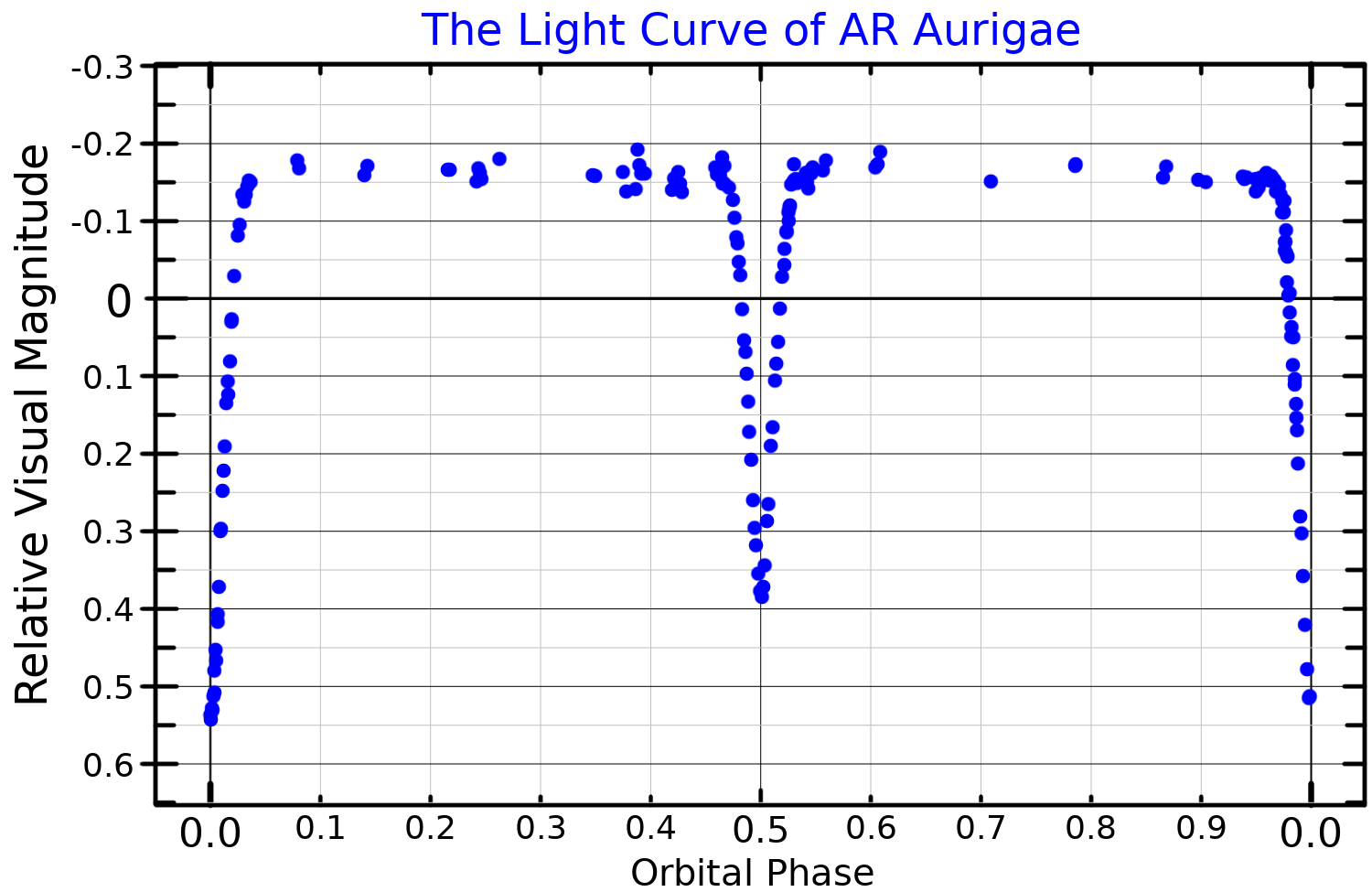
A visual band light curve for AR Aurigae, adapted from Johansen (1970)

The two inner components of this pair form an eclipsing binary system. This make AR Aurigae a variable star, with its brightness varying from magnitude +6.15 to +6.82 with a period of 4.13 days. Both components are blue-white B-type main-sequence stars that do not fill their Roche lobes.

The primary component of AR Aurigae is known to be a mercury-manganese star, also known as an HgMn star. As the name implies, these stars have over-abundances of the elements mercury and manganese, and also often xenon and other elements. Because AR Aurigae is an eclipsing binary (in fact, it is the only known eclipsing binary with a mercury-manganese star), accurate characterization of its parameters has been made possible.

In 1931, H. N. Pendersen and J. C. Steensgard became the first persons to detect these eclipses. When an eclipse is not occurring, the star will be faintly visible to the naked eye under very good observing conditions.

The third component has been detected by analysing the difference between the observed and the predicted time of eclipses, which is caused by the light-time effect of its orbital motion around the pair. This star has a mass of 0.54 M_{☉} and is orbiting at a separation of 13 AU every 23.7 years.
