= 16 Aurigae =

Triple star system in the constellation Auriga

- Location of 16 Aurigae (circled in red)

Observation data Epoch J2000 Equinox ICRS
- Constellation: Auriga
- Right ascension: 05^{h} 18^{m} 10.576^{s}
- Declination: +33° 22′ 17.77″
- Apparent magnitude (V): 4.552

Characteristics
- Evolutionary stage: red giant branch
- Spectral type: K2.5 IIIb CN-0.5
- U−B color index: +1.26
- B−V color index: +1.276

Astrometry
Radial velocity (R_{v})	−28.44 km/s
Proper motion (μ)	RA: +28.505±0.713 mas/yr Dec.: −158.421±0.504 mas/yr
Parallax (π)	9.5090±0.5651 mas
Distance	340 ± 20 ly (105 ± 6 pc)
Absolute magnitude (M_{V})	0.28

Orbit
Period (P)	434.16±0.03 d
Semi-major axis (a)	7.24±1.59 mas
Eccentricity (e)	0.1189±0.0026
Inclination (i)	52.93±9.46°
Longitude of the node (Ω)	56.20±11.65°
Periastron epoch (T)	2,448,348.1172±17.1872 JD
Argument of periastron (ω) (secondary)	70.1±1.2°

Details

16 Aur A
Mass	1.30 M_{☉}
Radius	19.86±0.89 R_{☉}
Luminosity	127±11 L_{☉}
Surface gravity (log g)	1.87 cgs
Temperature	4,264±58 K
Metallicity [Fe/H]	−0.40 dex
Rotational velocity (v sin i)	0.0 km/s
Age	5.07 Gyr

Other designations
- 16 Aur, NSV 1909, BD+33°1000, HD 34334, HIP 24727, HR 1726, SAO 57853, PPM 70153, ADS 3872, WDS J05182+3322

Database references
SIMBAD	data

16 Aurigae is a triple star system located 340 light years away from the Sun in the northern constellation of Auriga. It is visible to the naked eye as a faint, orange-hued star with an apparent visual magnitude of 4.547, and is located about 2/3 of the way from Capella toward Beta Tauri. It also lies in the midst of the Melotte 31 cluster, but is merely a line-of-sight interloper. The system has a relatively high proper motion, advancing across the celestial sphere at the rate of 0.166 arc seconds per annum, and is moving closer to the Earth with a heliocentric radial velocity of −28 km/s.

The primary component is a single-lined spectroscopic binary with an orbital period of 1.19 years and an eccentricity of 0.1189. The visible member is an aging K-type giant star with a stellar classification of K2.5 IIIb CN-0.5; sometimes just given as K3 III. The notation of the former class indicates weak lines of CN in the spectrum. This star is an estimated five billion years old with 1.30 times the mass of the Sun. As a consequence of exhausting the hydrogen at its core, it has expanded to 20 times the Sun's radius. The star is radiating 127 times the luminosity of the Sun from its enlarged photosphere at an effective temperature of 4,264 K.

A third component is a magnitude 10.6 star at an angular separation of 4.2″. It shows a common proper motion with the primary and thus is a likely third member of the system.
