= 47 Aurigae =

Star in the constellation Auriga

Observation data Epoch J2000 Equinox ICRS
- Constellation: Auriga
- Right ascension: 06^{h} 30^{m} 02.97400^{s}
- Declination: +46° 41′ 08.0041″
- Apparent magnitude (V): 5.88

Characteristics
- Evolutionary stage: giant
- Spectral type: K4 III
- B−V color index: 1.448±0.008

Astrometry
Radial velocity (R_{v})	−48.32±0.20 km/s
Proper motion (μ)	RA: −7.582 mas/yr Dec.: +7.854 mas/yr
Parallax (π)	4.7747±0.0978 mas
Distance	680 ± 10 ly (209 ± 4 pc)
Absolute magnitude (M_{V})	−0.47

Details
Mass	1.40±0.41 M_{☉}
Radius	35.9+2.5 −2.0 R_{☉}
Luminosity	357.7±8.9 L_{☉}
Surface gravity (log g)	1.57±0.11 cgs
Temperature	4,157±92 K
Metallicity [Fe/H]	−0.218±0.093 dex
Age	2.14+0.95 −0.66 Gyr

Other designations
- 47 Aur, BD+46°1149, FK5 2496, HD 45466, HIP 30972, HR 2338, SAO 41130

Database references
SIMBAD	data

47 Aurigae is a star located around 680 light years away from the Sun in the northern constellation of Auriga. It is visible to the naked eye as a dim, orange-hued star with an apparent visual magnitude of 5.88. This object is moving closer to the Earth with a heliocentric radial velocity of −48 km/s, and is expected to come to within 111 ly in around 3.6 million years.

This object is an aging giant star with a stellar classification of K4 III, having exhausted the hydrogen supply at its core then expanded to 36 times the Sun's radius. It is roughly two billion years old with 1.4 times the mass of the Sun. The star is radiating 358 times the luminosity of the Sun from its swollen photosphere at an effective temperature of 4,157 K.
