= 39 Aurigae =

Star in the constellation Auriga

Observation data Epoch J2000 Equinox ICRS
- Constellation: Auriga
- Right ascension: 06^{h} 05^{m} 03.38470^{s}
- Declination: +42° 58′ 53.8886″
- Apparent magnitude (V): 5.90

Characteristics
- Evolutionary stage: main sequence
- Spectral type: F1 V
- B−V color index: 0.358±0.005

Astrometry
Radial velocity (R_{v})	+34.1±2.9 km/s
Proper motion (μ)	RA: −44.854 mas/yr Dec.: −146.396 mas/yr
Parallax (π)	20.0918±0.0875 mas
Distance	162.3 ± 0.7 ly (49.8 ± 0.2 pc)
Absolute magnitude (M_{V})	2.45

Details
Mass	1.51 M_{☉}
Radius	2.02 R_{☉}
Luminosity	8.4 L_{☉}
Surface gravity (log g)	4.14±0.14 cgs
Temperature	7,161±243 K
Metallicity [Fe/H]	−0.03±0.15 dex
Rotational velocity (v sin i)	87.8±4.4 km/s
Age	603 Myr

Other designations
- 39 Aur, BD+42°1477, HD 41074, HIP 28823, HR 2132, SAO 40840

Database references
SIMBAD	data

39 Aurigae is a single star in the constellation of Auriga. The designation is from the star catalogue of English astronomer John Flamsteed, first published in 1712. The star is just barely visible to the naked eye, having an apparent visual magnitude of 5.90. Based upon an annual parallax shift of 20.10 mas as seen from Earth, it is located 162 light years away. 39 Aurigae is moving further from the Sun with a radial velocity of +34 km/s. It has a relatively high proper motion, advancing across the celestial sphere at the rate of 0.151 arc seconds per year.

This is an F-type main-sequence star with a stellar classification of F1 V. It is an estimated 603 million years old with a relatively high rate of spin, showing a projected rotational velocity of around 88 km/s. The star has 1.5 times the mass of the Sun and it is radiating 8.4 times the Sun's luminosity from its photosphere at an effective temperature of around 7,161 K.
