= Psi6 Aurigae =

Binary star in the constellation Auriga

ψ^{6} Aurigae
- Location of ψ^{6} Aurigae (circled)

Observation data Epoch J2000.0 Equinox J2000.0 (ICRS)
- Constellation: Auriga
- Right ascension: 06^{h} 47^{m} 39.576^{s}
- Declination: +48° 47′ 22.14″
- Apparent magnitude (V): +5.22

Characteristics
- Evolutionary stage: red giant branch
- Spectral type: K0.5 III
- U−B color index: +1.04
- B−V color index: +1.11
- Variable type: Constant

Astrometry
Radial velocity (R_{v})	−6.51±0.30 km/s
Proper motion (μ)	RA: +3.988 mas/yr Dec.: +4.748 mas/yr
Parallax (π)	8.0121±0.1402 mas
Distance	407 ± 7 ly (125 ± 2 pc)
Absolute magnitude (M_{V})	+0.01

Orbit
Period (P)	5,996±26 d
Eccentricity (e)	0.044±0.014
Periastron epoch (T)	52556 ± 310 MJD
Argument of periastron (ω) (secondary)	222±19°
Semi-amplitude (K_{1}) (primary)	3.24±0.04 km/s

Details

ψ^{6} Aur A
Mass	2.02±0.28 M_{☉}
Radius	17.72±0.76 R_{☉}
Luminosity	123.4±10.2 L_{☉}
Surface gravity (log g)	2.25±0.07 cgs
Temperature	4,574±26 K
Metallicity [Fe/H]	−0.08±0.10 dex
Rotational velocity (v sin i)	+10 km/s
Age	1.55±0.67 Gyr

Other designations
- ψ^{6} Aur, 57 Aurigae, BD+48°1436, FK5 1176, HD 48781, HIP 32562, HR 2487, SAO 41346

Database references
SIMBAD	data

Psi^{6} Aurigae is a spectroscopic binary star system in the northern constellation of Auriga. Its name is a Bayer designation that is Latinized from ψ^{6} Aurigae, and abbreviated Psi^{6} Aur or ψ^{6} Aur. This system is visible as a dim, naked eye star with an apparent visual magnitude of +5.22. Based upon a measured annual parallax shift of 8.01 mas, it is approximately 407 light-years (125 parsecs) distant from the Earth. The system is drifting closer to the Sun with a radial velocity of −6.5 km/s.

This is a single-lined spectroscopic binary star system with an orbital period of 5,996 days (16.4 years) and an eccentricity of 0.044. The visible component is an evolved K-type giant star with a stellar classification of K0.5 III. It is most likely (78% chance) on the red giant branch and is around 1.55 billion years old. As such, it has an estimated double the mass of the Sun and about 18 times the Sun's radius. The star is radiating about 123 times the Sun's luminosity from its photosphere at an effective temperature of 4,574 K.
