= 1 Aurigae =

Star in the constellation Perseus

- Location of 1 Aurigae (circled)

Observation data Epoch J2000 Equinox ICRS
- Constellation: Perseus
- Right ascension: 04^{h} 49^{m} 54.63946^{s}
- Declination: +37° 29′ 17.7936″
- Apparent magnitude (V): 4.89

Characteristics
- Spectral type: K3.5IIIBa0.2:
- U−B color index: +1.71
- B−V color index: +1.45

Astrometry
Radial velocity (R_{v})	−24.65 km/s
Proper motion (μ)	RA: −36.89 mas/yr Dec.: +38.85 mas/yr
Parallax (π)	6.48±0.44 mas
Distance	500 ± 30 ly (150 ± 10 pc)
Absolute magnitude (M_{V})	−1.04

Details
Mass	1.49 M_{☉}
Radius	44±5 R_{☉}
Luminosity	561 L_{☉}
Surface gravity (log g)	1.12 cgs
Temperature	4,102 K
Metallicity [Fe/H]	−0.30 dex
Rotational velocity (v sin i)	1.6 km/s
Age	3.93 Gyr

Other designations
- 1 Aur, BD+37°969, FK5 1133, GC 5868, HD 30504, HIP 22453, HR 1533, SAO 57447

Database references
SIMBAD	data

1 Aurigae is the original name for a star now in the constellation Perseus. It was the first entry in John Flamsteed's catalogue of stars in Auriga. When Eugène Joseph Delporte drew up simplified boundaries for the constellations on behalf of the International Astronomical Union in 1930, 1 Aurigae ended up over the border in Perseus. To avoid confusion, the star may instead be referred to by its Harvard Revised catalogue number, HR 1533.

Based upon its parallax measurement of 6.48 mas, this star is located approximately 520 light years from Earth. It is visible to the naked eye as a faint, orange-hued star with an apparent visual magnitude of 4.89. 1 Aurigae is moving closer to the Earth with a heliocentric radial velocity of −25 km/s.

This is a possible binary star system, based upon the status of the visible component as a mild barium star. The primary is an aging giant star with a stellar classification of K3.5 III Ba0.2:. It is 3.9 billion years old with 1.49 times the mass of the Sun and around 44 times the Sun's radius. This star is radiating 561 times the luminosity of the Sun from its enlarged photosphere at an effective temperature of 4,102 K. The suspected companion star should be a white dwarf that previously transferred s-process elements to the visible member.
