= 40 Aurigae =

Binary star in the constellation Auriga

Observation data Epoch J2000 Equinox ICRS
- Constellation: Auriga
- Right ascension: 06^{h} 06^{m} 35.09752^{s}
- Declination: +38° 28′ 57.5285″
- Apparent magnitude (V): 5.345

Characteristics
- Evolutionary stage: main sequence
- Spectral type: A4m
- U−B color index: +0.11
- B−V color index: +0.23

Astrometry
Radial velocity (R_{v})	16.90±7.4 km/s
Proper motion (μ)	RA: +9.452 mas/yr Dec.: −54.087 mas/yr
Parallax (π)	9.1085±0.0728 mas
Distance	358 ± 3 ly (109.8 ± 0.9 pc)
Absolute magnitude (M_{V})	+0.26

Orbit
Period (P)	28.28 d
Eccentricity (e)	0.56
Periastron epoch (T)	JD 2420468.197
Argument of periastron (ω) (secondary)	178.4°
Semi-amplitude (K_{1}) (primary)	51.4 km/s
Semi-amplitude (K_{2}) (secondary)	62.5 km/s

Details
Mass	1.81 M_{☉}
Radius	4.62 R_{☉}
Luminosity	68 L_{☉}
Surface gravity (log g)	3.88±0.08 cgs
Temperature	7,838±52 K
Metallicity [Fe/H]	+0.35±0.05 dex
Rotational velocity (v sin i)	71 km/s
Age	559 Myr

Other designations
- AG+38°663, BD+38°1377, FK5 2465, GC 7723, HD 41357, HIP 28946, HR 2143, SAO 58749, PPM 71223, PLX 1403, TYC 2925-806-1, GCRV 3828, GSC 02925-00806, IRAS 06031+3829, 2MASS J06063509+3828578

Database references
SIMBAD	data

40 Aurigae is a binary star in the constellation Auriga. Its apparent magnitude is 5.345, meaning it can just barely be seen with the naked eye. Based on parallax estimates made by the Hipparcos spacecraft, the system is located some 340 light-years (104 parsecs) away.

40 Aurigae is a spectroscopic binary, meaning the two stars are too close to be individually resolved, but periodic Doppler shifts in their spectra indicate there must be orbital motion. In this case, light from both stars can be detected and it is a double-lined spectroscopic binary. The two have an orbital period of 28.28 days and a fairly high eccentricity of 0.56. The primary star is an A-type main-sequence star and shows unusual absorption lines in its spectrum, so it is an Am star with an effective temperature of 7,838 K.
