= 45 Aurigae =

Binary star in the constellation Auriga

Observation data Epoch J2000 Equinox ICRS
- Constellation: Auriga
- Right ascension: 06^{h} 21^{m} 46.13030^{s}
- Declination: +53° 27′ 07.8306″
- Apparent magnitude (V): 5.34

Characteristics
- Evolutionary stage: main sequence
- Spectral type: F5 V
- B−V color index: 0.448±0.005

Astrometry
| Radial velocity (R_{v}) | −0.4±0.1 km/s |
| Proper motion (μ) | RA: +22.597 mas/yr Dec.: −88.884 mas/yr |
| Parallax (π) | 16.2503±0.1210 mas |
| Distance | 201 ± 1 ly (61.5 ± 0.5 pc) |
| Absolute magnitude (M_{V}) | 1.48 |

Orbit
| Period (P) | 6.5011 d |
| Eccentricity (e) | 0.000 |
| Periastron epoch (T) | 2444496.869 ± 0.006 JD |
| Argument of periastron (ω) (secondary) | 0.000° |
| Semi-amplitude (K_{1}) (primary) | 32.0±0.2 km/s |

Details

45 Aur A
| Mass | 1.20 M_{☉} |
| Luminosity | 21.72 L_{☉} |
| Surface gravity (log g) | 3.57±0.14 cgs |
| Temperature | 6,489±221 K |
| Metallicity [Fe/H] | 0.23±0.03 dex |
| Rotational velocity (v sin i) | 14 km/s |
| Age | 1.561 Gyr |

Other designations
- 45 Aur, BD+53°1008, FK5 2484, GC 8151, HD 43905, HIP 30247, HR 2264, SAO 25681, PPM 30377, PLX 1468.2, TYC 3764-2617-1

Database references
| SIMBAD | data |

45 Aurigae or PLX 1468.2 is a binary star system in the northern constellation of Auriga. It has an apparent visual magnitude of 5.34, making it visible to the naked eye under suitable viewing conditions. An annual parallax shift of 16.25 mas as seen from Earth's orbit indicates the system is located about 201 light years from the Sun.

This is a close, single-lined spectroscopic binary with a circularized orbit with a short period of 6.5 days. They have a mean angular separation of 0.963 mas. The visible component has a stellar classification of F5 V, matching an F-type main-sequence star that is generating energy through hydrogen fusion at it core. It is about 1.6 billion years old and is spinning with a projected rotational velocity of 14 K. It has 1.2 times the mass of the Sun and is radiating 22 times the Sun's luminosity from its photosphere at an effective temperature of around 6,489 K. The secondary has a minimum mass of 42% of the Sun's mass.
