= 51 Aurigae =

K-type giant star in the constellation Auriga

Observation data Epoch J2000 Equinox ICRS
- Constellation: Auriga
- Right ascension: 06^{h} 38^{m} 39.53667^{s}
- Declination: +39° 23′ 27.0659″
- Apparent magnitude (V): 5.696

Characteristics
- Spectral type: K5III
- U−B color index: +1.56
- B−V color index: +1.34

Astrometry
Radial velocity (R_{v})	31.98±0.15 km/s
Proper motion (μ)	RA: −22.753 mas/yr Dec.: −108.896 mas/yr
Parallax (π)	7.0332±0.1300 mas
Distance	464 ± 9 ly (142 ± 3 pc)
Absolute magnitude (M_{V})	0.76

Details
Mass	1.58±0.53 M_{☉}
Radius	24.5±0.7 R_{☉}
Luminosity	178.0±3.9 L_{☉}
Surface gravity (log g)	1.84±0.11 cgs
Temperature	4,277±92 K
Metallicity [Fe/H]	0.01±0.05 dex
Age	2.2 Gyr

Other designations
- 51 Aur, BD+39°1690, FK5 250, HD 47070, HIP 31771, HR 2419, SAO 59316

Database references
SIMBAD	data

51 Aurigae is a single star in the northern constellation of Auriga. It is visible to the naked eye as a dim, orange-hued star with an apparent visual magnitude of about 5.70. Based on parallax, it is located some 464 light-years (142 parsecs) away from the Sun. It is receding from the Earth with a heliocentric radial velocity of 32 km/s.

At 2.2 billion years old, 51 Aurigae has evolved off from the main sequence and is now a K-type giant star. It is 1.58 times as massive as the Sun, 24.5 times as wide, and 178 times as luminous. It emits radiation from its photosphere with an effective temperature of about 4,277 K.
