= 19 Aurigae =

Star in the constellation Auriga

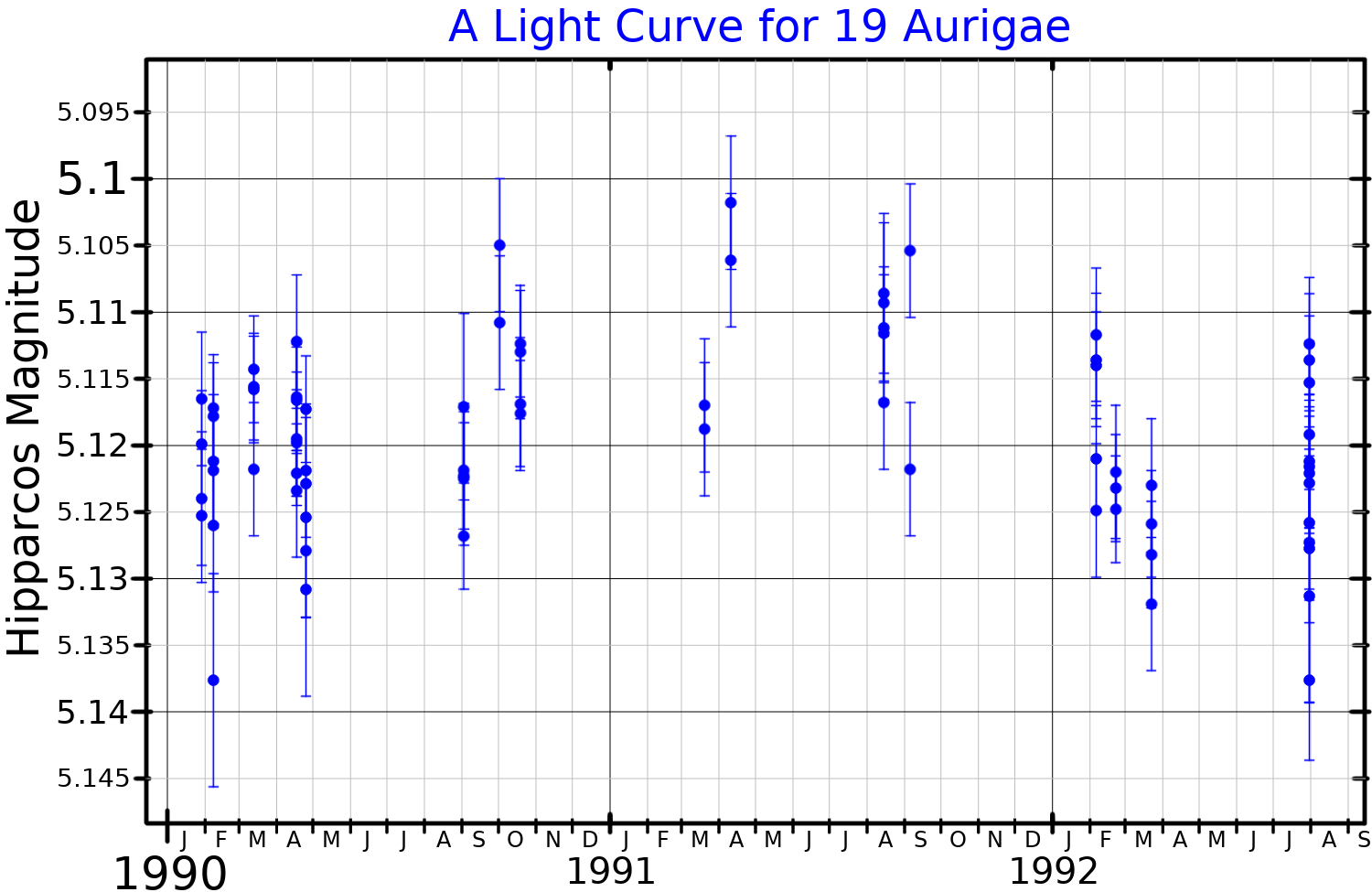
- A light curve for 19 Aurigae, adapted from Chistyakov and Sokolov (1999)

Observation data Epoch J2000 Equinox ICRS
- Constellation: Auriga
- Right ascension: 05^{h} 20^{m} 00.92110^{s}
- Declination: +33° 57′ 28.9949″
- Apparent magnitude (V): 5.05

Characteristics
- Evolutionary stage: bright giant
- Spectral type: A5 II+
- B−V color index: 0.287±0.004

Astrometry
Radial velocity (R_{v})	−4.3±0.9 km/s
Proper motion (μ)	RA: −0.264 mas/yr Dec.: −3.415 mas/yr
Parallax (π)	0.8596±0.0950 mas
Distance	approx. 3,800 ly (approx. 1,200 pc)

Details
Mass	7.8±0.5 M_{☉}
Radius	15 R_{☉}
Luminosity (bolometric)	7,057 L_{☉}
Surface gravity (log g)	2.10±0.25 cgs
Temperature	8,300±100 K
Metallicity [Fe/H]	−0.19 dex
Rotational velocity (v sin i)	8.0 km/s
Age	36.0±2.9 Myr

Other designations
- 19 Aur, NSV 1925, AAVSO 0520+34B, BD+33°1013, GC 6515, HD 34578, HIP 24879, HR 1740, SAO 57906

Database references
SIMBAD	data

19 Aurigae is a single star located approximately 3,800 light years away from the Sun in the northern constellation Auriga. It is visible to the naked eye as a faint, white-hued star with an apparent visual magnitude of 5.05. The star is moving closer to the Earth with a heliocentric radial velocity of 4.3 km/s.

This is an evolved A-type bright giant star with a stellar classification of A5 II+. It is a variable star of unknown type that ranges in magnitude from 5.03 down to 5.09. This star is an estimated 36 million years old with a projected rotational velocity of 8 km/s. It has 8 times the mass of the Sun and about 15 times the Sun's radius. 19 Aurigae is radiating 7,057 times the total luminosity of the Sun from its photosphere at an effective temperature of 8,300 K.
