= 62 Aurigae =

Star in the constellation Auriga

Observation data Epoch J2000 Equinox ICRS
- Constellation: Auriga
- Right ascension: 06^{h} 59^{m} 02.84733^{s}
- Declination: +38° 03′ 08.3463″
- Apparent magnitude (V): 6.02

Characteristics
- Evolutionary stage: red giant branch
- Spectral type: K2 III
- B−V color index: 1.218±0.007

Astrometry
Radial velocity (R_{v})	+24.67±0.13 km/s
Proper motion (μ)	RA: −41.583 mas/yr Dec.: −122.245 mas/yr
Parallax (π)	5.8109±0.0295 mas
Distance	561 ± 3 ly (172.1 ± 0.9 pc)
Absolute magnitude (M_{V})	−0.99

Details
Mass	3.9 M_{☉}
Radius	21 R_{☉}
Luminosity	176 L_{☉}
Surface gravity (log g)	1.69 cgs
Temperature	4,419 K
Metallicity [Fe/H]	−0.54 dex
Rotational velocity (v sin i)	1.0 km/s

Other designations
- 62 Aur, BD+38°1656, FK5 2538, HD 51440, HIP 33614, HR 2600, SAO 59658

Database references
SIMBAD	data

62 Aurigae is a star located 561 light years away from the Sun in the northern constellation of Auriga. It is visible to the naked eye as a dim, orange-hued star with an apparent visual magnitude of 6.02. This object is moving further from the Earth with a heliocentric radial velocity of +25 km/s. It is an aging giant star with a stellar classification of K2 III, having exhausted the supply of hydrogen at its core then expanded to 21 times the Sun's radius. 62 Aurigae is radiating 176 times the luminosity of the Sun from its swollen photosphere at an effective temperature of 4,419 K.
