= 54 Aurigae =

Multiple star system in the constellation Auriga

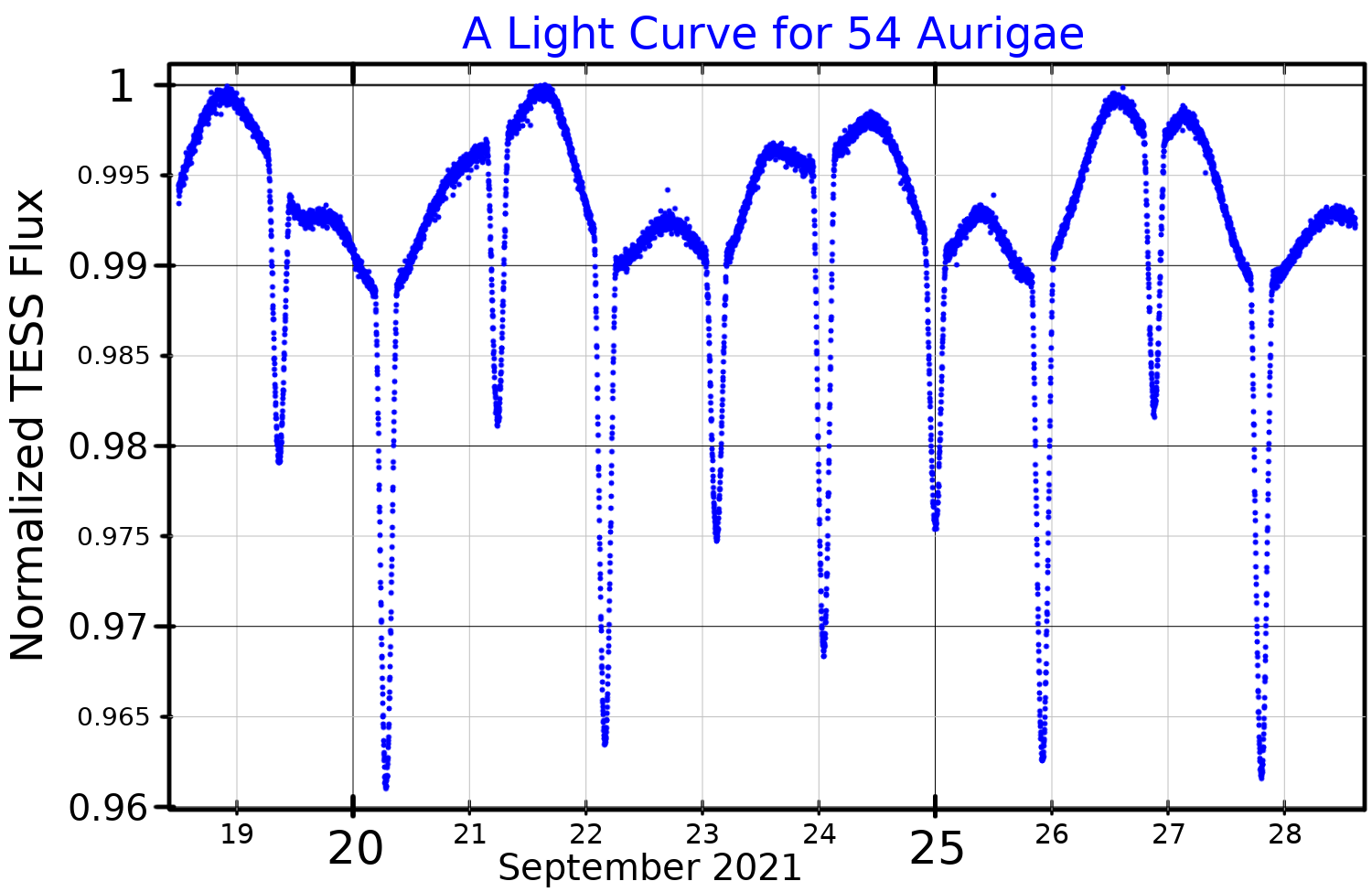
- A light curve for 54 Aurigae, plotted from TESS data

Observation data Epoch J2000 Equinox ICRS
- Constellation: Auriga
- A
- Right ascension: 06^{h} 39^{m} 33.12003^{s}
- Declination: +28° 15′ 47.2764″
- Apparent magnitude (V): 6.22
- B
- Right ascension: 06^{h} 39^{m} 33.11965^{s}
- Declination: +28° 15′ 47.2740″
- Apparent magnitude (V): 7.82

Characteristics
- Spectral type: B7 III
- B−V color index: −0.087±0.007
- Variable type: Algol

Astrometry

A
Radial velocity (R_{v})	+19.0±4.3 km/s
Proper motion (μ)	RA: −5.461 mas/yr Dec.: −10.523 mas/yr
Parallax (π)	3.5961±0.0952 mas
Distance	910 ± 20 ly (278 ± 7 pc)

Details

54 Aur A
Luminosity	315.49 L_{☉}
Temperature	11,083 K
Rotational velocity (v sin i)	65 km/s

Other designations
- 54 Aur, NSV 3065, BD+28°1196, FK5 2504, GC 8681, HD 47395, HIP 31852, HR 2438, SAO 78593, ADS 5289, WDS J06395+2816

Database references
SIMBAD	data

54 Aurigae is a multiple star system located around 800 light-years (51,000,000 AU) away from the Sun in the northern constellation of Auriga. It is visible to the naked eye as a dim, blue-white hued star with a combined apparent visual magnitude of 6.02. The system is moving further from the Sun with a heliocentric radial velocity of around +19 km/s.

54 Aurigae is resolved into two visible components of magnitudes 6.22 and 7.82, separated by 0.8″. The double was discovered in 1843 when the separation was only 0.7″. There is no separate measure of the parallax of the secondary, but it shares a common proper motion with the brighter star and they are assumed to form a binary. The spectral class B7 III is assigned to the brighter of the pair, indicating a hot giant star, although it has also been given as B7/8 III/V, suggesting it may be a main sequence star. Most sources can't give a separate spectral classification for the fainter star, but it has been listed as DA1/K4V, indicating it is either a white dwarf or red dwarf.

The brighter component of the visible pair is an eclipsing binary with a period of 1.8797 days, and a primary eclipse depth of 0.03 magnitudes. It is radiating 315 times the luminosity of the Sun from its photosphere at an effective temperature of 11,083 K (10,810 °C; 19,490 °F), and is spinning with a projected rotational velocity of 65 kilometres per second (40 mi/s).
