= 38 Aurigae =

K-type giant star in the constellation Auriga

Observation data Epoch J2000 Equinox ICRS
- Constellation: Auriga
- Right ascension: 06^{h} 03^{m} 17.94729^{s}
- Declination: +42° 54′ 41.5433″
- Apparent magnitude (V): 6.08

Characteristics
- Evolutionary stage: horizontal branch
- Spectral type: K0 III
- B−V color index: 0.979±0.004

Astrometry
| Radial velocity (R_{v}) | +33.69±0.20 km/s |
| Proper motion (μ) | RA: +121.023 mas/yr Dec.: −144.427 mas/yr |
| Parallax (π) | 13.8158±0.2136 mas |
| Distance | 236 ± 4 ly (72 ± 1 pc) |
| Absolute magnitude (M_{V}) | 1.572 |

Details
| Mass | 1.59 M_{☉} |
| Radius | 7 R_{☉} |
| Luminosity | 18.47 L_{☉} |
| Surface gravity (log g) | 2.95 cgs |
| Temperature | 4,834 K |
| Metallicity [Fe/H] | −0.17 dex |
| Age | 3.6±1.0 Gyr |

Other designations
- 38 Aur, BD+42°1473, FK5 2461, HD 40801, HIP 28677, HR 2199, SAO 40818

Database references
| SIMBAD | data |

38 Aurigae is a star located 236 light years away from the Sun in the northern constellation of Auriga. It is visible to the naked eye as a dim, orange-hued star with an apparent visual magnitude of 6.08. The star is moving further from the Earth with a heliocentric radial velocity of +34 km/s, and it has a relatively high proper motion, traversing the celestial sphere at the rate of 0.181 arc seconds per annum. It is a probable member of the Hercules stream.

This object is an aging giant star with a stellar classification of K0 III. At the age of around 3.6 billion years it is a red clump giant, which indicates it is on the horizontal branch and is generating energy via helium fusion at its core. The star has 1.59 times the mass of the Sun and has expanded to 7 times the Sun's radius. It is radiating 18 times the Sun's luminosity from its swollen photosphere at an effective temperature of 4,834 K.

38 Aurigae has a faint common proper motion companion at an angular separation of 152″, which is equivalent to a projected separation of 12,160 AU. This is a red dwarf star with a class of M5.3.
