= 43 Aurigae =

Star in the constellation Auriga

Observation data Epoch J2000 Equinox ICRS
- Constellation: Auriga
- Right ascension: 06^{h} 18^{m} 16.86513^{s}
- Declination: +46° 21′ 37.5926″
- Apparent magnitude (V): 6.33

Characteristics
- Evolutionary stage: giant
- Spectral type: K2 III
- B−V color index: 1.113±0.007

Astrometry
Radial velocity (R_{v})	−3.35±0.20 km/s
Proper motion (μ)	RA: +12.111 mas/yr Dec.: −130.433 mas/yr
Parallax (π)	8.5429±0.0330 mas
Distance	382 ± 1 ly (117.1 ± 0.5 pc)
Absolute magnitude (M_{V})	0.92

Details
Mass	1.43 M_{☉}
Radius	10.80±0.42 R_{☉}
Luminosity	49.2±0.3 L_{☉}
Temperature	4,552±62 K
Metallicity [Fe/H]	−0.01±0.04 dex
Age	2.7±1.3 Gyr

Other designations
- 43 Aur, BD+46°1124, GC 8055, HD 43380, HIP 29949, HR 2239, SAO 41010

Database references
SIMBAD	data

43 Aurigae is a star located 382 light years away from the Sun in the northern constellation of Auriga. It is just bright enough to be barely visible to the naked eye with an apparent visual magnitude of 6.33. The star is moving closer to the Earth with a heliocentric radial velocity of −3.4 km/s.

This is an aging giant star with a stellar classification of K2 III, having exhausted the hydrogen at its core and expanded off the main sequence. Roughly three billion years old, this star has 1.43 times the mass of the Sun and 11 times the Sun's radius. It is radiating 49 times the luminosity of the Sun from its swollen photosphere at an effective temperature of 4,552 K.
