= HD 36041 =

Star in the constellation Auriga

Observation data Epoch J2000 Equinox ICRS
- Constellation: Auriga
- Right ascension: 05^{h} 30^{m} 45.08399^{s}
- Declination: +39° 49′ 33.2881″
- Apparent magnitude (V): 6.37

Characteristics
- Evolutionary stage: red giant branch
- Spectral type: G9III
- U−B color index: +0.76
- B−V color index: +0.97

Astrometry
| Radial velocity (R_{v}) | +11.5 km/s |
| Proper motion (μ) | RA: +22.567 mas/yr Dec.: −36.937 mas/yr |
| Parallax (π) | 6.6396±0.0230 mas |
| Distance | 491 ± 2 ly (150.6 ± 0.5 pc) |
| Absolute magnitude (M_{V}) | +0.18 |

Details
| Mass | 3.0 M_{☉} |
| Radius | 11.0 R_{☉} |
| Luminosity | 68 L_{☉} |
| Surface gravity (log g) | 2.68 cgs |
| Temperature | 4,995 K |
| Age | 377 Myr |

Other designations
- BD+39°1322, HD 36041, HIP 25810, HR 1825, SAO 58129

Database references
| SIMBAD | data |

HD 36041 is red giant star in the northern constellation Auriga. It has an apparent magnitude of 6.37, making it faintly visible to the naked eye. It forms a double star with HD 36027; the two are separated by 76″.
