= 42 Aurigae =

Star in the constellation Auriga

Observation data Epoch J2000 Equinox J2000
- Constellation: Auriga
- Right ascension: 06^{h} 17^{m} 34.6466^{s}
- Declination: +46° 25′ 26.229″
- Apparent magnitude (V): 6.53

Characteristics
- Evolutionary stage: main sequence
- Spectral type: F0 V or A6 Vp(4481 wk)n
- Apparent magnitude (G): 6.48
- B−V color index: 0.263±0.003

Astrometry
Radial velocity (R_{v})	−12.0±1.0 km/s
Proper motion (μ)	RA: −43.563±0.034 mas/yr Dec.: +11.150±0.026 mas/yr
Parallax (π)	13.1070±0.0288 mas
Distance	248.8 ± 0.5 ly (76.3 ± 0.2 pc)
Absolute magnitude (M_{V})	2.27

Details
Mass	1.70±0.02 M_{☉}
Radius	2.10 R_{☉}
Luminosity	11.2 L_{☉}
Surface gravity (log g)	4.18±0.14 cgs
Temperature	7,660±260 K
Rotational velocity (v sin i)	228 km/s
Age	1.042 Gyr

Other designations
- 42 Aur, BD+46°1122, HD 43244, HIP 29884, HR 2228, SAO 40999

Database references
SIMBAD	data

42 Aurigae is a star in the northern constellation of Auriga. The designation is from the star catalogue of English astronomer John Flamsteed, first published in 1712. It has an apparent visual magnitude of 6.53, which places it just below the visibility limit for normal eyesight under good seeing conditions. It displays an annual parallax shift of 13.107 mas, which yields a distance estimate of around 248.8 light years. The star is moving closer to the Sun with a radial velocity of −12 km/s. It is a member of the Ursa Major Moving Group of stars that share a common motion through space.

The star was assigned a stellar classification of F0 V by Nancy Roman in 1949, indicating it is an F-type main-sequence star. However, in 1995 Abt and Morrell catalogued it as class A6 Vp(4481 wk)n; a somewhat hotter and more massive A-type main-sequence star that displays spectral peculiarities as well as nebulous lines brought about by rapid rotation. It is around a billion years old with a high rate of spin, showing a projected rotational velocity of 228 km/s. The star has an estimated 1.7 times the mass of the Sun and is radiating 10 times the Sun's luminosity from its photosphere at an effective temperature of around 7,660 K.
