= 12 Aurigae =

Star in the constellation Auriga

Observation data Epoch J2000 Equinox ICRS
- Constellation: Auriga
- Right ascension: 05^{h} 16^{m} 27.08298^{s}
- Declination: +46° 24′ 57.8118″
- Apparent magnitude (V): 6.988

Characteristics
- Spectral type: B2 Ve

Astrometry
Proper motion (μ)	RA: −3.321 mas/yr Dec.: −1.2106 mas/yr
Parallax (π)	1.5264±0.0303 mas
Distance	2,140 ± 40 ly (660 ± 10 pc)

Details
Mass	3.0 M_{☉}
Radius	18 R_{☉}
Luminosity	635 L_{☉}
Surface gravity (log g)	2.47 cgs
Temperature	8,688 K
Metallicity	−0.94
Rotational velocity (v sin i)	100±41 km/s

Other designations
- 12 Aur, BD+46°989, GC 6424, HD 33988, SAO 40183, PPM 47919

Database references
SIMBAD	data

12 Aurigae is a Be star in the northern constellation Auriga. It lies below the normal limit for visibility to the naked eye, having an apparent visual magnitude of 6.988. It lacks a designation from the Hipparcos catalogue. It is located just under half a degree north of Capella.

Assigned spectral classes for 12 Aurigae vary greatly from B2 to B5 and the luminosity class from V (main sequence) to Ia (luminous supergiant). Its spectrum shows prominent emission lines, but the spectrum is complicated by the appearance of sharp shell components to some of the spectral lines. The colour of the star as shown by the B-V and U-B colour indices is not consistent with an early B spectral class, leading to many estimates of its effective temperature that are much lower than expected for a B-class star. The expected temperature for a B5 spectral type would be 15,400 K, but most sources assign a temperature of around 8,000 K. Other properties also vary between different sources, for example the bolometric luminosity derived from the distance and temperature is 25 L_{☉}, while it is 635 L_{☉} when derived by fitting the spectral energy distribution. A calculation of the stellar properties assuming the maximum possible interstellar extinction in the direction of 12 Aurigae results in a temperature of 14,336 K and a luminosity of 8,092 L_{☉}, although it is strongly noted that the likely extinction is much lower.
