= 6 Aurigae =

Star in the constellation Auriga

Observation data Epoch J2000.0 Equinox ICRS
- Constellation: Auriga
- Right ascension: 05^{h} 00^{m} 23.215^{s}
- Declination: +39° 39′ 16.75″
- Apparent magnitude (V): 6.48

Characteristics
- Evolutionary stage: red giant or supergiant
- Spectral type: K5III, K4I
- Apparent magnitude (G): 5.74
- U−B color index: +2.01
- B−V color index: +1.71

Astrometry
Radial velocity (R_{v})	−23.99±0.18 km/s
Proper motion (μ)	RA: +0.818±0.032 mas/yr Dec.: −2.790±0.025 mas/yr
Parallax (π)	2.7692±0.0293 mas
Distance	1,180 ± 10 ly (361 ± 4 pc)

Details
Mass	1.17 M_{☉}
Radius	77 R_{☉}
Luminosity	1,300 L_{☉}
Surface gravity (log g)	0.78 cgs
Temperature	3,928 K
Metallicity [Fe/H]	−0.10 dex

Other designations
- BD+39°1134, HD 31780, HIP 23268, HR 1602, SAO 57560

Database references
SIMBAD	data

6 Aurigae is a star in the constellation Auriga. Its apparent magnitude is 6.48, making it just visible to the naked eye in optimal conditions (HR 1602). It has been given the spectral classifications of K5 III and K4 I, indicating that the star presents characteristics of a giant and supergiant star.
