= Xi Aurigae =

Star in the constellation Auriga

- Location of ξ Aurigae (circled in red)

Observation data Epoch J2000.0 Equinox J2000.0 (ICRS)
- Constellation: Auriga
- Right ascension: 05^{h} 54^{m} 50.76694^{s}
- Declination: +55° 42′ 25.0802″
- Apparent magnitude (V): +5.00

Characteristics
- Evolutionary stage: main sequence
- Spectral type: A2 Va
- U−B color index: +0.12
- B−V color index: +0.05

Astrometry
| Radial velocity (R_{v}) | −13.3±2.4 km/s |
| Proper motion (μ) | RA: −7.049 mas/yr Dec.: +12.959 mas/yr |
| Parallax (π) | 13.3702±0.1670 mas |
| Distance | 244 ± 3 ly (74.8 ± 0.9 pc) |
| Absolute magnitude (M_{V}) | +0.64 |

Details
| Mass | 2.26 M_{☉} |
| Radius | 2.86 R_{☉} |
| Luminosity | 47.3 L_{☉} |
| Surface gravity (log g) | 3.88 cgs |
| Temperature | 8,954 K |
| Metallicity [Fe/H] | −0.36±0.04 dex |
| Rotational velocity (v sin i) | 62 km/s |
| Age | 174 Myr |

Other designations
- ξ Ari, 30 Aurigae, BD+55°1027, FK5 1157, GC 7404, HD 39283, HIP 27949, HR 2029, SAO 25450, PPM 30117

Database references
| SIMBAD | data |

Xi Aurigae is a single, white-hued star in the northern constellation of Auriga. Its name is a Bayer designation that is Latinized from ξ Aurigae, and abbreviated Xi Aur or ξ Ari. This star was once considered part of the constellation of Camelopardalis and held the Flamsteed designation 32 Camelopardalis. It is visible to the naked eye with an apparent visual magnitude of +5.0. The measured annual parallax shift of this star is 13.37 mas, which corresponds to a physical distance of 244 light-years (75 parsecs) with a 3 light-year margin of error. At that distance, the visual magnitude of the star is diminished by an extinction of 0.108 due to interstellar dust. The star is drifting closer to the Sun with a radial velocity of −13 km/s.

This is an A-type main sequence star with a stellar classification of A2 Va. Although it was one of the first stars to be cataloged as a Lambda Boötis star, Murphy et al. (2015) don't consider it to be a member of this population. The star has nearly twice the mass of the Sun and about 2.9 times the Sun's radius. It is an estimated 174 million years old and is spinning with a projected rotational velocity of 62 km/s. Xi Aurigae is radiating 47.3 times the Sun's luminosity from its photosphere at an effective temperature of around 8,954 K.
