= 36 Aurigae =

Star in the constellation Auriga

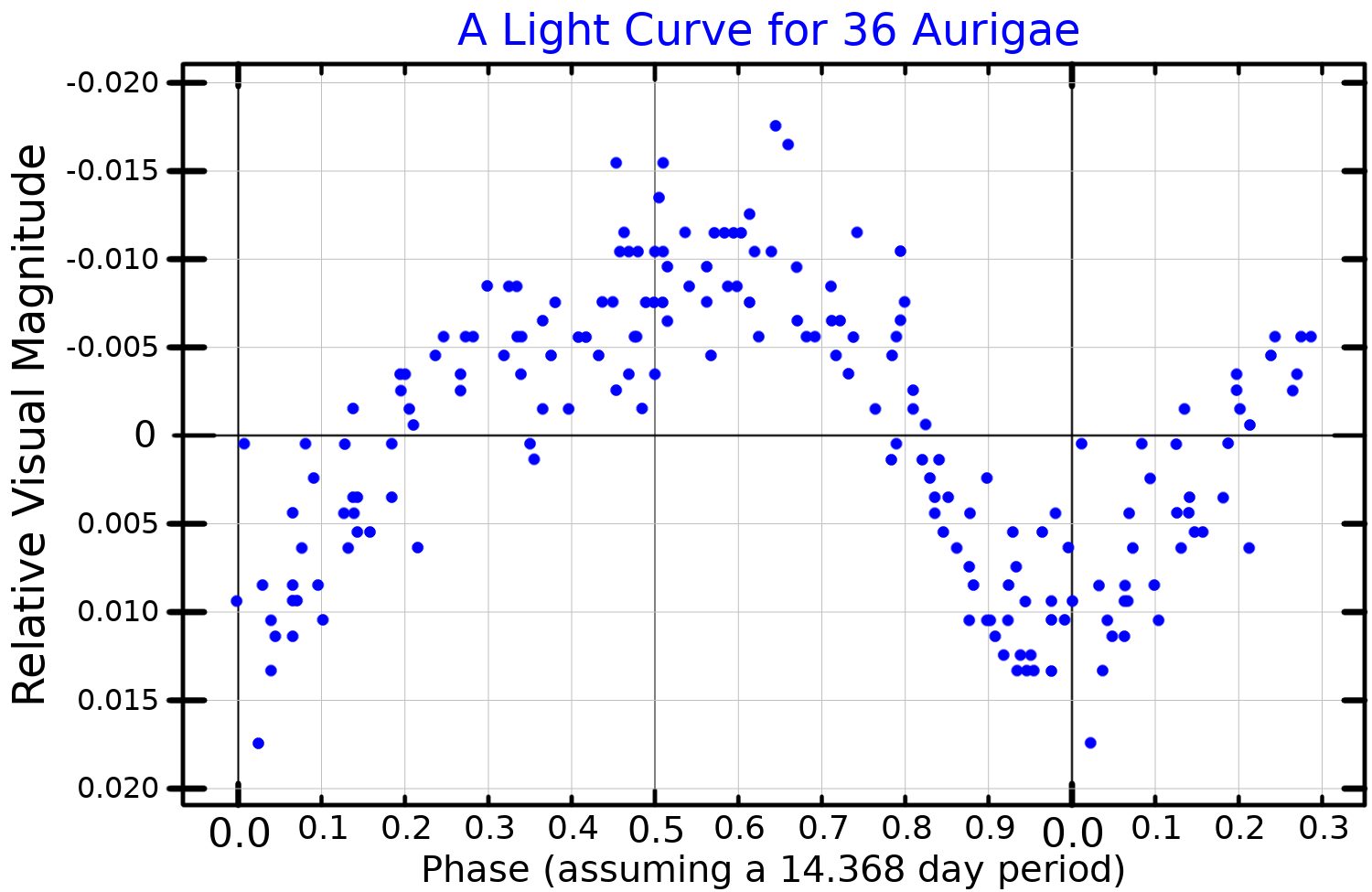
- The visual band light curve of 36 Aurigae, adapted from Adelman (2005)

Observation data Epoch J2000 Equinox ICRS
- Constellation: Auriga
- Right ascension: 06^{h} 00^{m} 58.56217^{s}
- Declination: +47° 54′ 06.9295″
- Apparent magnitude (V): 5.71

Characteristics
- Evolutionary stage: main sequence
- Spectral type: A1 Vp Si or B9.5p Si,Fe
- Apparent magnitude (G): 5.68
- B−V color index: −0.007±0.004
- Variable type: α^{2} CVn

Astrometry
Radial velocity (R_{v})	+15.8±2.1 km/s
Proper motion (μ)	RA: +4.261±0.080 mas/yr Dec.: −21.088±0.066 mas/yr
Parallax (π)	3.1546±0.0822 mas
Distance	1,030 ± 30 ly (317 ± 8 pc)
Absolute magnitude (M_{V})	−1.97

Details
Mass	4.42±0.43 M_{☉}
Radius	7.1 R_{☉}
Luminosity	724+348 −234 L_{☉}
Surface gravity (log g)	4.08 cgs
Temperature	10,046+522 −496 K
Rotational velocity (v sin i)	20 km/s
Age	302 Myr

Other designations
- 36 Aur, V444 Aurigae, BD+47°1227, HD 40394, HIP 28499, HR 2101, SAO 40778, 2MASS J06005856+4754069

Database references
SIMBAD	data

36 Aurigae is a single variable star located about 1030 light years away from the Sun in the constellation Auriga. It has the variable star designation V444 Aurigae, while 36 Aurigae is the Flamsteed designation. This object is visible to the naked eye as a dim, white-hued star with a baseline apparent visual magnitude of 5.71. It is moving further from the Earth with a heliocentric radial velocity of +16 km/s.

36 Aurigae was discovered to be a variable star when the Hipparcos data was analyzed. Because of that, it was given its variable star designation in 1999.

This is a magnetic chemically peculiar star that has been given stellar classifications of A1 Vp Si and B9.5p Si,Fe, indicating it is a late B- or early A-type star showing peculiarities of silicon and iron in the spectrum. It is an Alpha^{2} Canum Venaticorum variable that ranges in visual magnitude from 5.70 down to 5.74 with a period of 14.368 days. The star has 4.4 times the mass of the Sun and is radiating 724 times the Sun's luminosity from its photosphere at an effective temperature of 10,046 K.
