= 5 Aurigae =

Triple star system in the constellation Auriga

Observation data Epoch J2000 Equinox J2000
- Constellation: Auriga
- Right ascension: 05^{h} 00^{m} 18.33965^{s}
- Declination: +39° 23′ 40.9392″
- Apparent magnitude (V): 5.95 (6.02 + 9.50)

Characteristics
- Evolutionary stage: main sequence
- Spectral type: F5 V
- Apparent magnitude (G): 5.88
- U−B color index: −0.03
- B−V color index: +0.42

Astrometry
Radial velocity (R_{v})	+7.92±0.13 km/s
Proper motion (μ)	RA: −10.609±0.171 mas/yr Dec.: −2.561±0.120 mas/yr
Parallax (π)	18.3645±0.1215 mas
Distance	178 ± 1 ly (54.5 ± 0.4 pc)
Absolute magnitude (M_{V})	+2.07

Orbit
Period (P)	1,598.04±50.35 yr
Semi-major axis (a)	5.379±0.388″
Eccentricity (e)	0.536±0.031
Inclination (i)	56.1±0.8°
Longitude of the node (Ω)	155.4±0.7°
Periastron epoch (T)	3,242.73±8.96
Argument of periastron (ω) (secondary)	333.4±4.5°

Details

5 Aur A
Mass	1.48 or 1.70 M_{☉}
Luminosity	12.46 L_{☉}
Surface gravity (log g)	4.14 cgs
Temperature	6,603±225 K
Metallicity [Fe/H]	−0.02±0.07 dex
Age	2.205 Gyr

5 Aur B
Mass	0.82 M_{☉}

Other designations
- BD+39°1133, GC 6084, HD 31761, HIP 23261, HR 1599, SAO 57559, PPM 69817, ADS 3589, CCDM J05003+3924, WDS J05003+3924, TYC 2899-369-1

Database references
SIMBAD	data

5 Aurigae is a triple star system in the northern constellation of Auriga, located about 178 light years away from the Sun based on parallax. It is just visible to the naked eye as a dim, yellow-white hued star with an apparent visual magnitude of 5.95. The system is moving away from the Earth with a heliocentric radial velocity of +8 km/s, having come within 62.4 light-years some 8.7 million years ago.

This was initially discovered to be a binary star system by Otto Struve. The outer pair has an orbital period of 1,598 years with an eccentricity of 0.536. The magnitude 6.02 primary, component A, is itself a binary system consisting of two stars of similar mass, roughly 1.5 times the mass of the Sun each, with an orbital period of 8.08 years. It has a stellar classification of F5 V, matching an F-type main-sequence star.

As of 2017, component B is a magnitude 9.50 star at an angular separation of 4.10″ from the primary along a position angle of 285°.
