= 49 Aurigae =

Star in the constellation Auriga

Observation data Epoch J2000 Equinox J2000
- Constellation: Auriga
- Right ascension: 06^{h} 30^{m} 02.97400^{s}
- Declination: +46° 41′ 08.0041″
- Apparent magnitude (V): 5.26

Characteristics
- Evolutionary stage: main sequence
- Spectral type: A0 Vnn
- B−V color index: −0.008±0.006

Astrometry
| Radial velocity (R_{v}) | +17.0±2.8 km/s |
| Proper motion (μ) | RA: −7.582 mas/yr Dec.: +7.854 mas/yr |
| Parallax (π) | 4.7747±0.0978 mas |
| Distance | 680 ± 10 ly (209 ± 4 pc) |
| Absolute magnitude (M_{V}) | −0.01 |

Details
| Mass | 2.50 M_{☉} |
| Radius | 4.2 R_{☉} |
| Luminosity | 143 L_{☉} |
| Surface gravity (log g) | 3.60 cgs |
| Temperature | 9,782 K |
| Rotational velocity (v sin i) | 149 km/s |
| Age | 281 Myr |

Other designations
- 49 Aur, BD+28°1168, FK5 2504, HD 46553, HIP 31434, HR 2398, SAO 78524

Database references
| SIMBAD | data |

49 Aurigae is a single star located 680 light years away from the Sun in the northern constellation of Auriga. It is visible to the naked eye as a dim, white-hued star with an apparent visual magnitude of 5.26. The star is moving away from the Earth with a heliocentric radial velocity of +17 km/s, having come to within 149 ly some 5.5 million years ago. It is positioned near the ecliptic and thus is subject to lunar occultations.

This object is an A-type main-sequence star with a stellar classification of A0 Vnn, where the 'n' notation indicates "nebulous" lines due to rapid rotation. It is spinning with a projected rotational velocity of 149 km/s. This star has around 4.2 times the radius of the Sun and is radiating 143 times the Sun's luminosity from its photosphere at an effective temperature of 9,782 K.
