= Psi Aurigae =

The stars of Auriga with ψ stars on the left

The Bayer designation Psi Aurigae (ψ Aur, ψ Aurigae) is shared by nine star systems in the constellation Auriga and one in Lynx:

- ψ^{1} Aurigae = 46 Aurigae
- ψ^{2} Aurigae = 50 Aurigae
- ψ^{3} Aurigae = 52 Aurigae
- ψ^{4} Aurigae = 55 Aurigae
- ψ^{5} Aurigae = 56 Aurigae
- ψ^{6} Aurigae = 57 Aurigae
- ψ^{7} Aurigae = 58 Aurigae
- ψ^{8} Aurigae = 61 Aurigae
- ψ^{9} Aurigae = HR 2568
- ψ^{10} Aurigae = 16 Lyncis

The Psi Aurigae stars mostly belonged to the now obsolete constellation Telescopium Herschelii, which is now part of Auriga.

Johann Bode recognised most of the Psi Aurigae stars as part of Telescopium Herschelli, except for Psi1 Aurigae, which he designated d Aurigae, ψ^{3} which he designated ψ^{2}, and 51 Aurigae being ψ^{1}. After the stars were returned the designations were reverted.

Other names of the Psi Aurigae stars include:

- Βουλήγες in Greek, meaning goads
- Dolones in Latin
- Almost of them were member of asterism 座旗 (Zuò Qí), Seat Flags, Turtle Beak mansion.
