= Telescopium Herschelii =

Former constellation

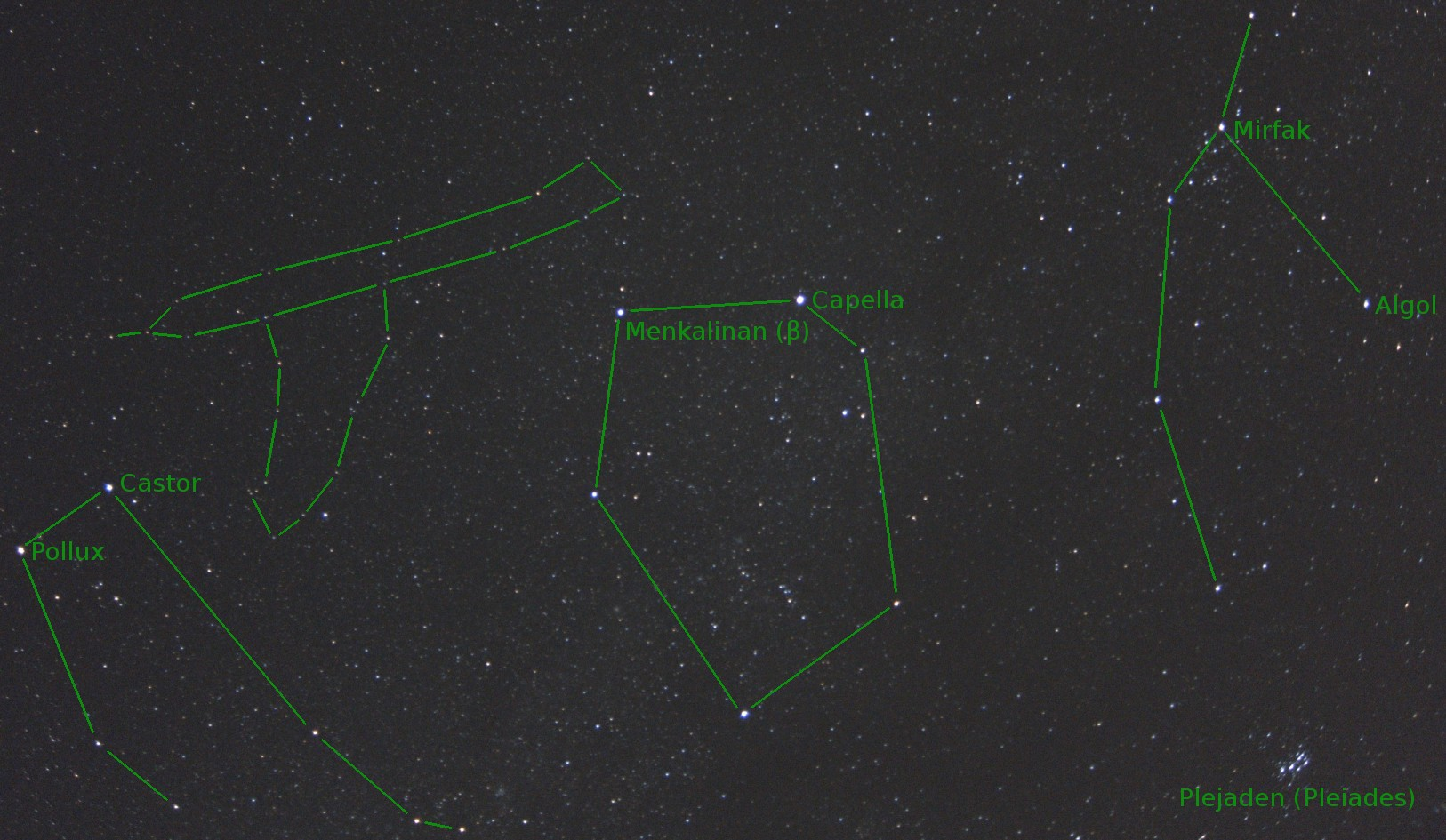
Photograph of Telescopium Herschelii with constellations Gemini, Auriga, Perseus and the Pleiades

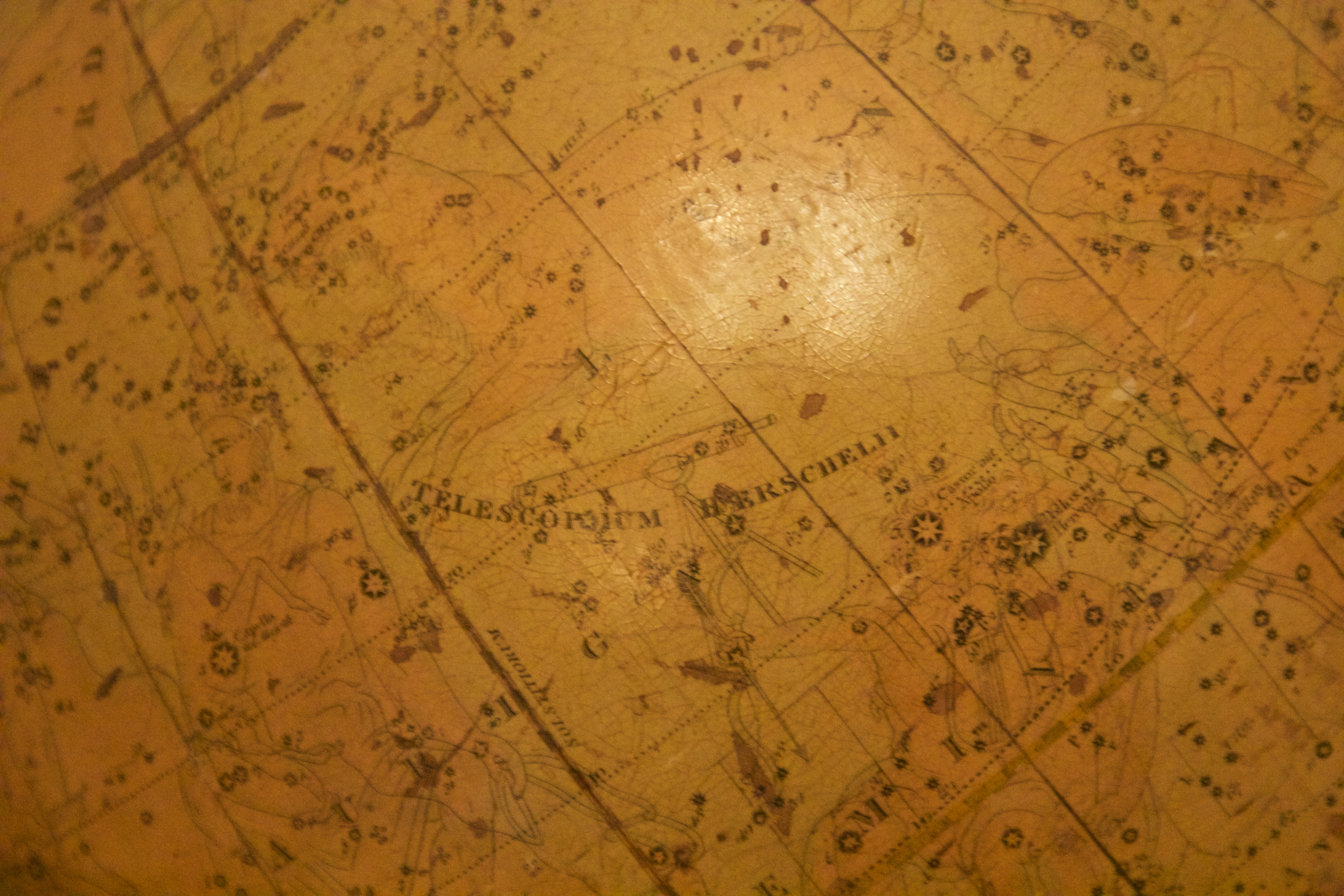
Telescopium Herschelii on a celestial globe at the Herschel Museum of Astronomy, Bath

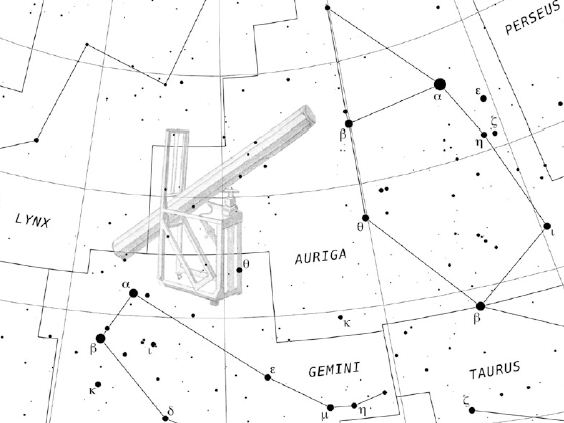
Artistic rendering of Telescopium Herschelii

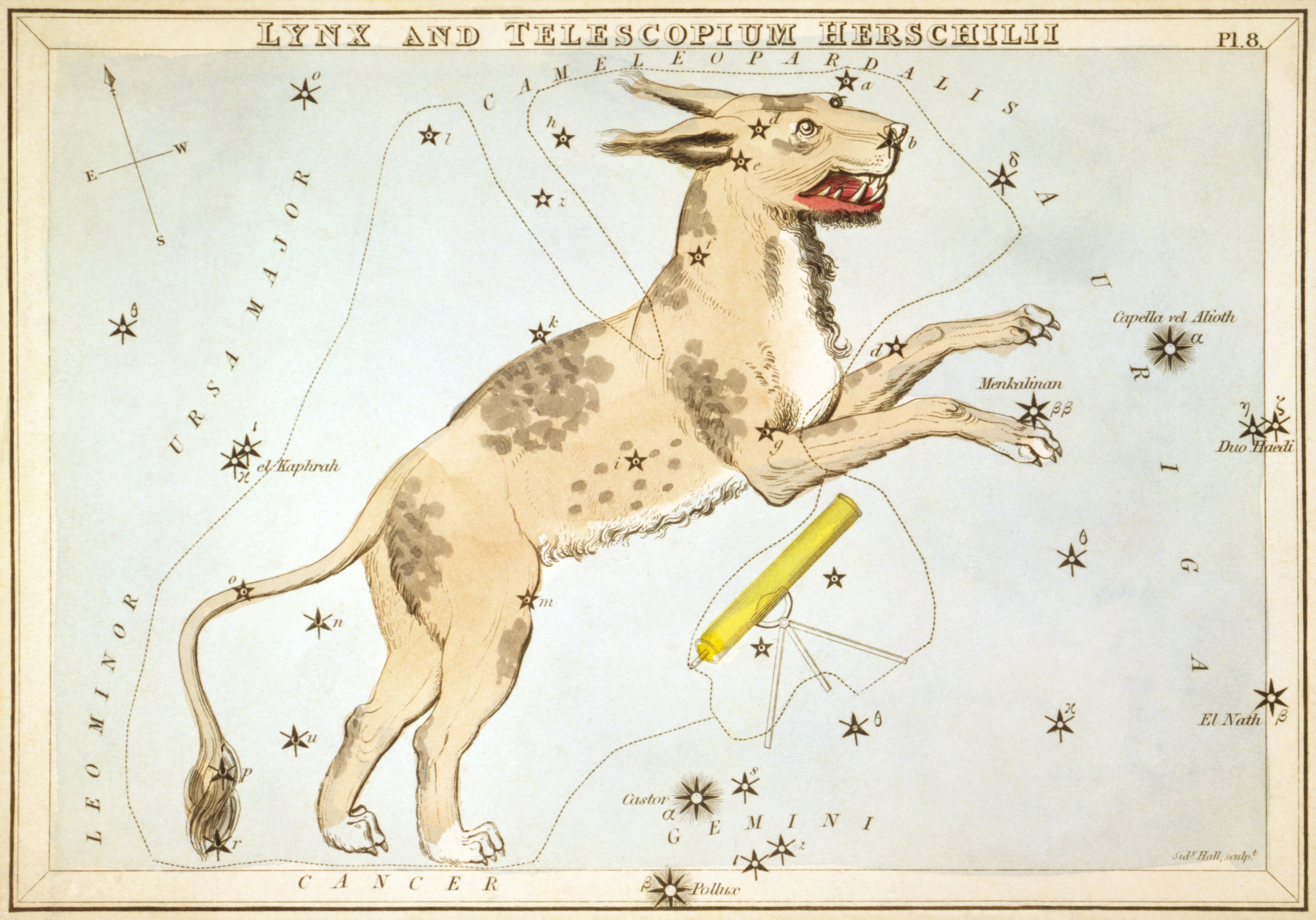
Illustrated in Urania's Mirror (1825), next to Lynx

Telescopium Herschelii (Latin for Herschel's telescope), also formerly known as Tubus Hershelli Major, is a former constellation in the northern celestial hemisphere. Maximilian Hell established it in 1789 to honour Sir William Herschel's discovery of the planet Uranus. It fell out of use by the end of the 19th century. ψ^{2} Aurigae at apparent magnitude 4.79 was the constellation's brightest star.

== History ==
It was one of two constellations created by Maximilian Hell in 1789 to honour the famous British astronomer Sir William Herschel's discovery of the planet Uranus. Named Tubus Hershelli Major by Hell, it was located in the constellation Auriga near the border to Lynx and Gemini and depicted Herschel's 20-foot-long telescope. Its sibling was Tubus Hershelli Minor, which lay between Orion and Taurus. The two telescopes lay near Zeta Tauri, near where the planet Uranus was first spotted.

Johann Elert Bode renamed the constellation Telescopium Herschelii and omitted the smaller telescope constellation in his 1801 Uranographia star atlas. In his atlas, the constellation depicted Herschel's earlier 7-foot telescope. It was ignored by some celestial cartographers such as Argelander in 1843, Proctor in 1876, Rosser in 1879 and Pritchard in 1885, yet did appear in two works of the 1890s. However, it was noted by Allen in 1899 that it was becoming obsolete. In 1930, when the official borders of the constellations were drawn up, its stars were absorbed into Auriga, Gemini and Lynx.

== Stars ==
ψ^{2} Aurigae (also known as 50 Aurigae), with an apparent magnitude of 4.8, was the brightest star in the constellation, Bode assigning it the designation 'a'. Located 420 ± 20 light-years distant from Earth, it is an orange giant of spectral type K3III. Other stars belonging to the constellation include ψ^{4}, ψ^{5}, ψ^{7}, ψ^{8}, ψ^{9}, 63, 64, 65 and 66 Aurigae, and o Geminorum.

Thought to be around 4 billion years old, ψ^{5} Aurigae is a sunlike star of spectral type G0V that is around 1.07 times as massive as the Sun and 1.18 times as wide. It appears to have a circumstellar disk of dust, known as a debris disk.

Bode also gave them Bayer designations from a to p, also adding an uppercase B, although after the constellation was declared obsolete they were disused.

Here is a table of stars with the corresponding Bayer designations.

| Name | B |
|---|---|
| ψ^{2}Aur | a |
| ψ^{4}Aur | b |
| ψ^{7}Aur | c |
| 63 Aur | d |
| 64 Aur | e |
| 65 Aur | f |
| 66 Aur | g |
| HIP 35623 | h |
| HIP 37946 | i |
| HIP 35113 | k |
| ψ^{5}Aur | l |
| 47 Aur | m |
| HIP 35265 | n |
| Jishui | o |
| 60 Aur | p^{1} |
| 59 Aur | p^{2} |
| HIP 34267 | B |

== See also ==
- Telescopium
- Former constellations
