= Jishui =

Jishui may refer to

- Jishui River (濟水河), another name for the Ji River in Shandong
- Jishui County (吉水县), Ji'an, Jiangxi
- Jishui River (急水溪) in Tainan, Taiwan
- Jishui, the IAU-approved proper name for the star Omicron Geminorum

== See also ==
- Ji River
