= 16 Lyncis =

Star in the constellation Lynx

- Location of 16 Lyncis (circled)

Observation data Epoch J2000 Equinox J2000
- Constellation: Lynx
- Right ascension: 06^{h} 57^{m} 37.10709^{s}
- Declination: +45° 05′ 38.7404″
- Apparent magnitude (V): 4.90

Characteristics
- Spectral type: A0Vn
- B−V color index: 0.03
- Variable type: suspected

Astrometry
| Radial velocity (R_{v}) | −11.90±1 km/s |
| Proper motion (μ) | RA: −21.52±0.27 mas/yr Dec.: −3.12±0.17 mas/yr |
| Parallax (π) | 13.54±0.23 mas |
| Distance | 241 ± 4 ly (74 ± 1 pc) |
| Absolute magnitude (M_{V}) | 0.56 |

Details
| Mass | 2.38 M_{☉} |
| Luminosity | 56 L_{☉} |
| Surface gravity (log g) | 4.02 cgs |
| Temperature | 10,395±353 K |
| Rotational velocity (v sin i) | 229 km/s |
| Age | 181 Myr |

Other designations
- Psi^{10} Aurigae, 16 Lyn, BD+45°1367, HD 50973, HIP 33485, HR 2585, SAO 41463

Database references
| SIMBAD | data |

16 Lyncis is a star in the constellation Lynx. It is positioned next to the western constellation border with Auriga, and is also known as Psi^{10} Aurigae, which is Latinized from ψ^{10} Aurigae. The star has a white hue and is visible to the naked eye with an apparent visual magnitude of 4.90. The distance to this object is approximately 241 light-years based on parallax, but it is drifting closer to the Sun with a radial velocity of −12 km/s. It has an absolute magnitude of 0.56.

This object is a solitary A-type main-sequence star with a stellar classification of A0Vn, a star that is currently fusing its core hydrogen. The 'n' suffix indicates "nebulous" absorption lines due to rapid rotation. It is around 181 million years old with a projected rotational velocity of 229 km/s. This spin rate is giving the star an oblate shape with an equatorial bulge that is an estimated 10% larger than the polar radius. 16 Lyncis has 2.38 times the mass of the Sun and is radiating 56 times the Sun's luminosity from its photosphere at an effective temperature of 10,395 K.

16 Lyncis is suspected of being slightly variable, but this has not been confirmed. It was noted when 16 Lyncis was used as a comparison star for observing another variable, the peculiar HD 51418 (NY Aurigae).

== See also ==
- Psi Aurigae
