= 64 Aurigae =

Star in the constellation Auriga

Observation data Epoch J2000 Equinox J2000
- Constellation: Auriga
- Right ascension: 07^{h} 18^{m} 02.21420^{s}
- Declination: +40° 53′ 00.2248″
- Apparent magnitude (V): 5.87

Characteristics
- Evolutionary stage: main sequence
- Spectral type: A5 Vn
- B−V color index: 0.181±0.005

Astrometry
| Radial velocity (R_{v}) | −10.0±4.3 km/s |
| Proper motion (μ) | RA: −12.784 mas/yr Dec.: +12.065 mas/yr |
| Parallax (π) | 10.4466±0.1116 mas |
| Distance | 312 ± 3 ly (96 ± 1 pc) |
| Absolute magnitude (M_{V}) | 1.22 |

Details
| Mass | 1.88 M_{☉} |
| Radius | 3.1 R_{☉} |
| Luminosity | 32 L_{☉} |
| Surface gravity (log g) | 3.74 cgs |
| Temperature | 7,870 K |
| Rotational velocity (v sin i) | 212 km/s |
| Age | 291 Myr |

Other designations
- 64 Aur, BD+41°1630, FK5 276, HD 56221, HIP 35341, HR 2753, SAO 41679

Database references
| SIMBAD | data |

64 Aurigae is a single star located 312 light years away from the Sun in the northern constellation of Auriga. It is visible to the naked eye as a dim, white-hued star with an apparent magnitude of 5.87. The star is moving closer to the Earth with a heliocentric radial velocity of −10, and may come to within 167 light-years in around 5.3 million years. It is a member of the Sirius supercluster.

This object is an ordinary A-type main-sequence star with a stellar classification of 5 Vn, where the 'n' notation is used to indicate "nebulous" lines in the spectrum caused by rapid rotation. It is 291 million years old with a projected rotational velocity of 212 km/s. The star has 1.9 times the mass of the Sun and is radiating 32 times the Sun's luminosity from its photosphere at an effective temperature of 7,870 K.

It was also known to be part of a much bigger constellation named Telescopium Herschelii before it was unrecognized by the International Astronomical Union (IAU).
