= 60 Aurigae =

Binary star system in the constellation Auriga

Observation data Epoch J2000 Equinox J2000
- Constellation: Auriga
- Right ascension: 06^{h} 53^{m} 13.40058^{s}
- Declination: +38° 26′ 16.8476″
- Apparent magnitude (V): 6.319 (6.47/8.96)

Characteristics
- Spectral type: F5 V (A8/G0)
- B−V color index: +0.328

Astrometry
Radial velocity (R_{v})	+32.4 km/s
Proper motion (μ)	RA: +42.40 mas/yr Dec.: −179.12 mas/yr
Parallax (π)	15.21±1.03 mas
Distance	210 ± 10 ly (66 ± 4 pc)
Absolute magnitude (M_{V})	2.11

Orbit
Period (P)	271.10±61.00 yr
Semi-major axis (a)	0.793±0.073″
Eccentricity (e)	0.487±0.090
Inclination (i)	58.4±5.4°
Longitude of the node (Ω)	156.4±7.0°
Periastron epoch (T)	2002.72±6.07
Argument of periastron (ω) (secondary)	59.7±19.9°

Details
Temperature	6,223 K
Metallicity [Fe/H]	+0.04 dex
Age	1.7 Gyr

Other designations
- 60 Aurigae, BD+38°1636, HD 50037, HIP 33064, HR 2541, SAO 59576.

Database references
SIMBAD	data

60 Aurigae is a binary star system in the northern constellation of Auriga. The pair have a combined apparent visual magnitude of 6.319 and, based upon parallax measurements, they are approximately 210 light-years (64 parsecs) distant from the Earth.

The combined spectrum of the pair match a stellar classification of F5 V. The primary component may be an A-type star with an apparent magnitude of 6.47, while the fainter, 8.96 magnitude secondary is possibly a G-type star. The pair orbit each other with a period of 271.1 years at an angular separation of 0.793 arcseconds.

== Nomenclature ==
60 Aurigae is the Flamsteed designation of this star, also catalogued as HR 2541 and HD 50037. The designation 60 Aurigae has sometimes been identified with Psi^{8} Aurigae however Simbad lists Psi^{8} Aurigae as 61 Aurigae.
