= Lambda Persei =

Star in the constellation Perseus

- Location of λ Persei (circled)

Observation data Epoch J2000 Equinox ICRS
- Constellation: Perseus
- Right ascension: 04^{h} 06^{m} 35.04360^{s}
- Declination: +50° 21′ 04.5500″
- Apparent magnitude (V): 4.29

Characteristics
- Evolutionary stage: main sequence
- Spectral type: A0IVn
- U−B color index: −0.04
- B−V color index: +0.02

Astrometry
Radial velocity (R_{v})	+6.1±2.0 km/s
Proper motion (μ)	RA: −12.75 mas/yr Dec.: −35.60 mas/yr
Parallax (π)	7.73±0.22 mas
Distance	420 ± 10 ly (129 ± 4 pc)
Absolute magnitude (M_{V})	−1.31

Details
Mass	2.1 M_{☉}
Radius	6.9 R_{☉}
Luminosity	352 L_{☉}
Surface gravity (log g)	4.05 cgs
Temperature	10,585 K
Metallicity [Fe/H]	+0.01 dex
Rotational velocity (v sin i)	196 km/s
Age	345 Myr

Other designations
- λ Per, 47 Persei, BD+49°1101, FK5 1113, GC 4924, HD 25642, HIP 19167, HR 1261, SAO 24412

Database references
SIMBAD	data

λ Persei, Latinized as Lambda Persei, is a star in the northern constellation of Perseus. It is visible to the naked eye as a faint, white-hued point of light with an apparent visual magnitude of 4.29. This object is located approximately 422 light years from the Sun based on parallax, and is drifting further away with a radial velocity of +6 km/s.

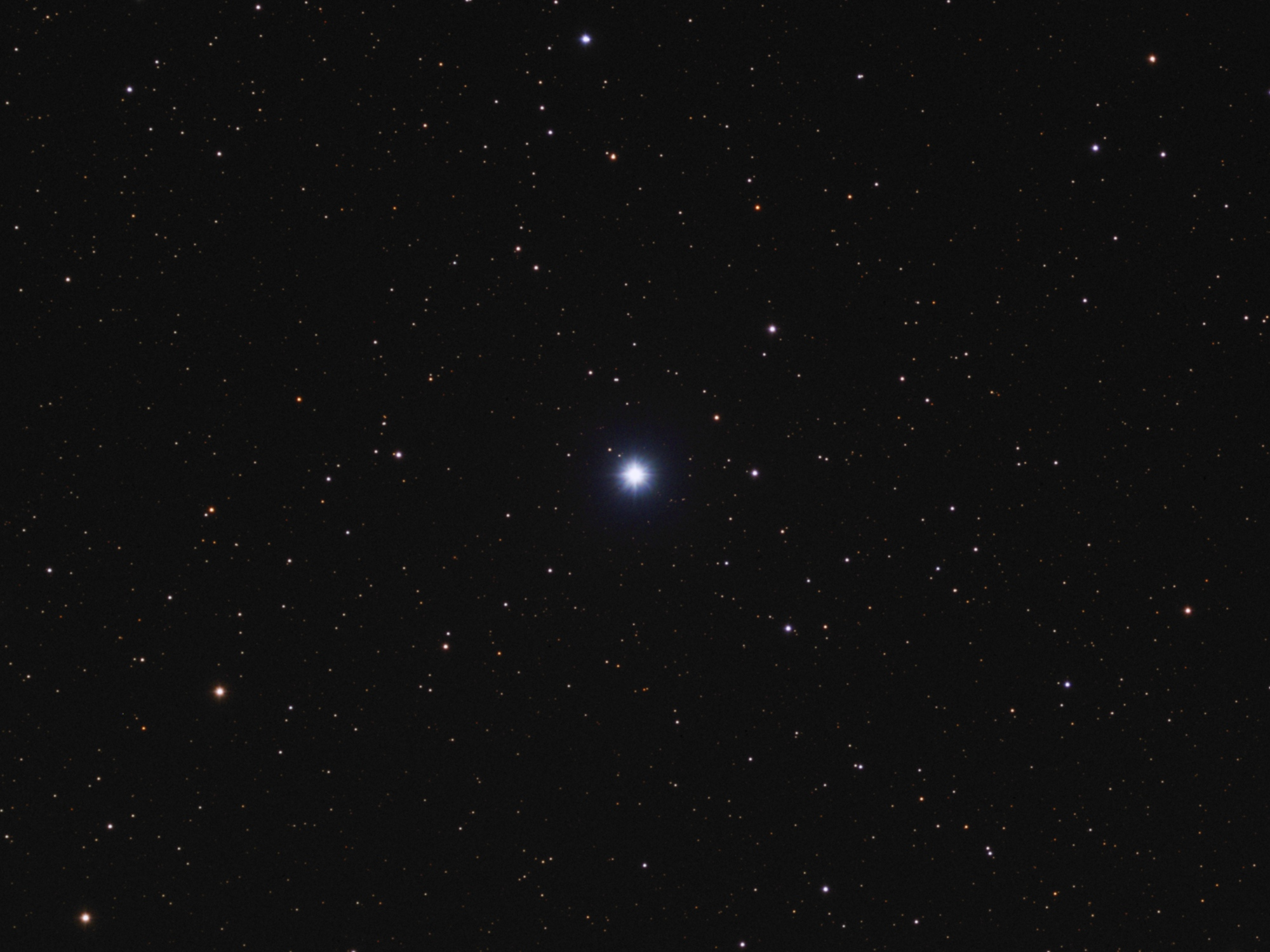
λ Persei in optical light

This object has a stellar classification of A0IVn, matching an A-type subgiant star with "nebulous" lines due to rapid rotation. It is spinning with a projected rotational velocity of 196 km/s, which is giving the star an equatorial bulge that is an estimated 16% larger than the polar radius. Unusually for a star of this type, spectra show weak emission features among the Hydrogen lines, which may be due to plage regions on the surface caused by an implied magnetic field. The star is 345 million years old and is radiating 352 times the luminosity of the Sun from its photosphere at an effective temperature of 10,585 K.

In Chinese astronomy, Lambda Persei is called 積水, Pinyin: Jīshuǐ, meaning Stored Water, because this star is marking itself and stand alone in Stored Water asterism, Stomach mansion (see : Chinese constellation). This name has also been applied to Omicron Geminorum and was approved by the IAU Working Group on Star Names as the name of that star.
