= 66 Aurigae =

Star in the constellation Auriga

Observation data Epoch J2000 Equinox ICRS
- Constellation: Auriga
- Right ascension: 07^{h} 24^{m} 08.46679^{s}
- Declination: +40° 40′ 20.5980″
- Apparent magnitude (V): 5.23

Characteristics
- Evolutionary stage: horizontal branch
- Spectral type: K0.5 IIIa
- B−V color index: 1.249±0.003

Astrometry
Radial velocity (R_{v})	+22.62±0.13 km/s
Proper motion (μ)	RA: −3.511 mas/yr Dec.: −20.935 mas/yr
Parallax (π)	3.7070±0.1684 mas
Distance	880 ± 40 ly (270 ± 10 pc)
Absolute magnitude (M_{V})	−2.58

Details
Mass	5.05 M_{☉}
Radius	48.05+1.66 −1.36 R_{☉}
Luminosity	834.3±43.6 L_{☉}
Temperature	4,475+65 −75 K
Metallicity [Fe/H]	0.09±0.03 dex
Rotational velocity (v sin i)	4.5 km/s
Age	107 Myr

Other designations
- 66 Aur, BD+40°1852, FK5 1191, GC 9850, HD 57669, HIP 35907, HR 2805, SAO 41738

Database references
SIMBAD	data

66 Aurigae (also named fyozai) is a single star located approximately 880 light years away from the Sun in the northern constellation of Auriga. It is visible to the naked eye as a faint, orange hued star with an apparent magnitude of 5.23. This object is moving further from the Earth with a heliocentric radial velocity of +22.6 km/s.

At the age of 107 million years, 66 Aurigae is an evolved giant star, most likely (98% chance) on the horizontal branch, with a stellar classification of K0.5 IIIa. Keenan and Yorka (1987) identified it as a strong–CN star, showing an excess strength of the blue CN bands in the spectrum. Having exhausted the supply of hydrogen at its core, the star has expanded to 48 times the Sun's radius. 66 Aurigae has five times the mass of the Sun and is radiating 834 times the Sun's luminosity from its swollen photosphere at an effective temperature of 4,475 K.

It was also known to be part of a much bigger constellation named Telescopium Herschelii before it was unrecognized by the International Astronomical Union (IAU).
