= 63 Aurigae =

Star in the constellation Auriga

- Location of 63 Aurigae (circled in red)

Observation data Epoch J2000 Equinox ICRS
- Constellation: Auriga
- Right ascension: 07^{h} 11^{m} 39.32608^{s}
- Declination: +39° 19′ 13.9844″
- Apparent magnitude (V): 4.91

Characteristics
- Evolutionary stage: giant
- Spectral type: K4 III
- B−V color index: 1.451±0.005

Astrometry
Radial velocity (R_{v})	−27.89±0.02 km/s
Proper motion (μ)	RA: +45.655 mas/yr Dec.: +2.791 mas/yr
Parallax (π)	8.2489±0.1974 mas
Distance	395 ± 9 ly (121 ± 3 pc)
Absolute magnitude (M_{V})	−0.95

Details
Radius	36.88+0.87 −1.51 R_{☉}
Luminosity	335.37±9.25 L_{☉}
Surface gravity (log g)	1.88 cgs
Temperature	4067.5+85.8 −47.5 K
Metallicity [Fe/H]	−0.17±0.06 dex

Other designations
- 63 Aur, BD+39°1882, FK5 274, HD 54716, HIP 34752, HR 2696, SAO 59866

Database references
SIMBAD	data

63 Aurigae is a single star located around 395 light years away from the Sun in the northern constellation of Auriga. It is visible to the naked eye as a faint, orange-hued star with an apparent magnitude of 4.91. It is moving closer to the Earth with a heliocentric radial velocity of −28 km/s.

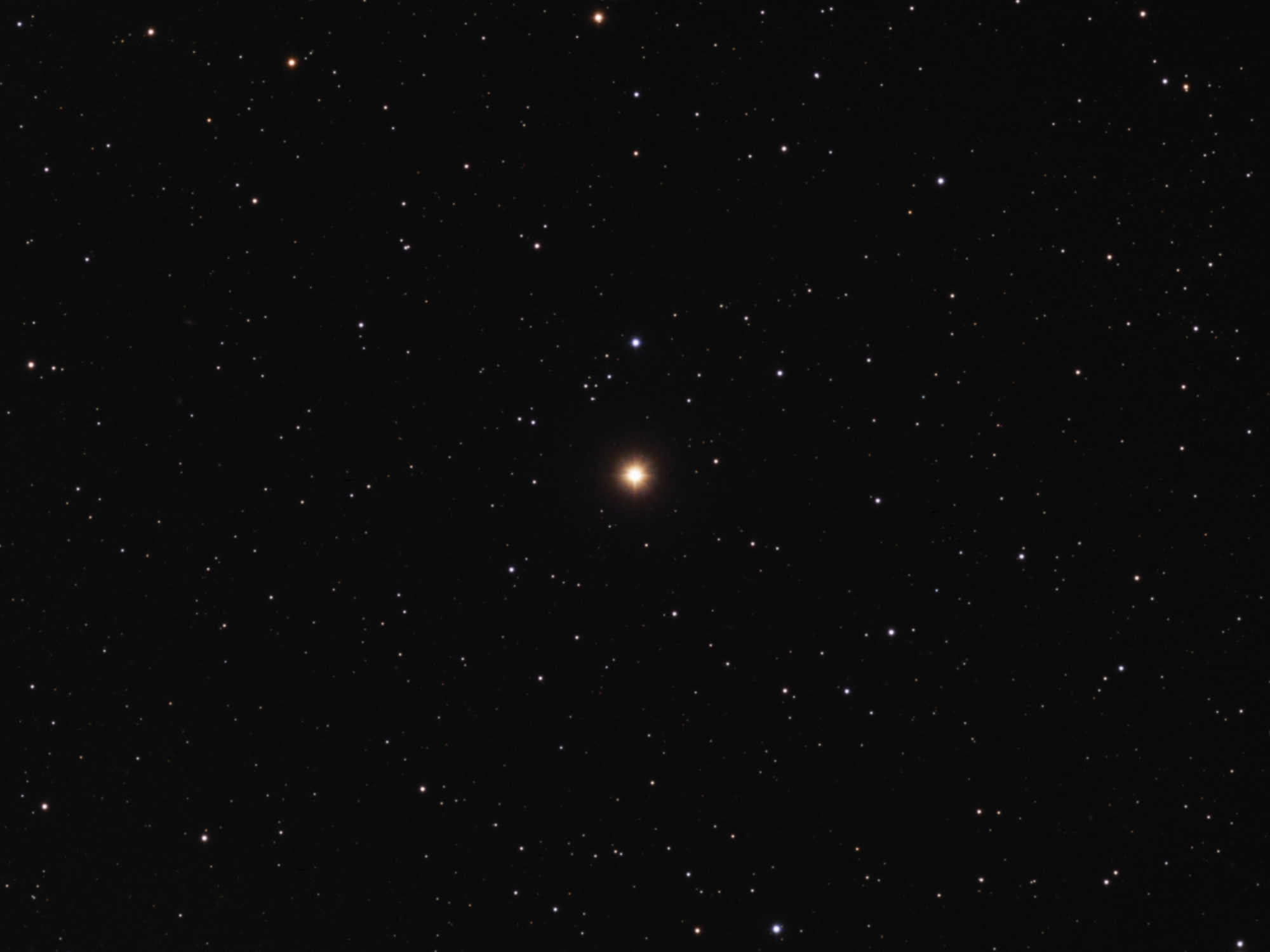
63 Aurigae in optical light

This is an evolved giant star with a stellar classification of K4 III. After exhausting the hydrogen at its core, the star has expanded to 37 times the radius of the Sun. It is radiating 335 times the Sun's luminosity from its enlarged photosphere at an effective temperature of 4,068 K.

It was also known to be part of a much bigger constellation named Telescopium Herschelii before it was unrecognized by the International Astronomical Union (IAU).
