= 65 Aurigae =

Binary star system in the constellation Auriga

Observation data Epoch J2000 Equinox ICRS
- Constellation: Auriga
- Right ascension: 07^{h} 22^{m} 02.61744^{s}
- Declination: +36° 45′ 38.0957″
- Apparent magnitude (V): 5.12

Characteristics
- Spectral type: K0 III
- B−V color index: 1.082±0.005

Astrometry
| Radial velocity (R_{v}) | 21.81±0.16 km/s |
| Proper motion (μ) | RA: −96.915 mas/yr Dec.: −22.436 mas/yr |
| Parallax (π) | 12.9673±0.1294 mas |
| Distance | 252 ± 3 ly (77.1 ± 0.8 pc) |
| Absolute magnitude (M_{V}) | 0.82 |

Details

65 Aur A
| Mass | 1.34 M_{☉} |
| Radius | 13.02+0.47 −2.57 R_{☉} |
| Luminosity | 69.6±0.9 L_{☉} |
| Surface gravity (log g) | 2.72 cgs |
| Temperature | 4,575±17 K |
| Metallicity [Fe/H] | −0.35±0.04 dex |
| Rotational velocity (v sin i) | 0.0 km/s |
| Age | 3.31 Gyr |

Other designations
- 65 Aur, BD+37°1707, FK5 2568, HD 57264, HIP 35710, HR 2793, SAO 60010

Database references
| SIMBAD | data |

65 Aurigae is a binary star system located 252 light years away from the Sun in the northern constellation of Auriga. It is visible to the naked eye as a faint, orange hued star with an apparent visual magnitude of 5.12. The primary, designated component A, is an aging giant star with a stellar classification of K0 III. It is 3.31 billion years old and has expanded to 13 times the Sun's radius after exhausting the hydrogen at its core. Its companion, component B, is a magnitude 11.7 star located at an angular separation of 11.4″ from the primary, as of 2008. The pair are moving further from the Earth with a heliocentric radial velocity of 22 km/s.

It was also known to be part of a much bigger constellation named Telescopium Herschelii before it was unrecognized by the International Astronomical Union (IAU).
