= Omicron Geminorum =

Star in the constellation Gemini

ο Geminorum
- Location of ο Geminorum (circled)

Observation data Epoch J2000.0 Equinox J2000.0 (ICRS)
- Constellation: Gemini
- Right ascension: 07^{h} 39^{m} 09.93466^{s}
- Declination: +34° 35′ 03.5028″
- Apparent magnitude (V): 4.90

Characteristics
- Evolutionary stage: Subgiant
- Spectral type: F5-6 IV
- U−B color index: +0.09
- B−V color index: +0.41

Astrometry
Radial velocity (R_{v})	+7.3 km/s
Proper motion (μ)	RA: −37.975 mas/yr Dec.: −105.132 mas/yr
Parallax (π)	19.3338±0.1263 mas
Distance	169 ± 1 ly (51.7 ± 0.3 pc)
Absolute magnitude (M_{V})	1.35

Details
Mass	2.0 M_{☉}
Radius	4.0 R_{☉}
Luminosity	24 L_{☉}
Surface gravity (log g)	3.48 cgs
Temperature	6,470 K
Metallicity [Fe/H]	+0.12 dex
Rotational velocity (v sin i)	91.1 km/s
Age	1.2 Gyr

Other designations
- Jishui, ο Gem, 71 Geminorum, BD+34°1649, FK5 2592, HD 61110, HIP 37265, HR 2930, SAO 60247

Database references
SIMBAD	data

Omicron Geminorum (ο Geminorum, abbreviated Omicron Gem, ο Gem), also named Jishui, is a solitary star in the constellation of Gemini. It is faintly visible to the naked eye with an apparent visual magnitude of 4.90. Based upon an annual parallax shift of 19.3 mas, it is located at a distance of 169 light-years from the Sun.

== Nomenclature ==
ο Geminorum (Latinised to Omicron Geminorum) is the star's Bayer designation.

The star bore the traditional Chinese name of Jishui, meaning a store of water; this name has also been applied to Lambda Persei. In 2016, the IAU organized a Working Group on Star Names (WGSN) to catalog and standardize proper names for stars. The WGSN approved the name Jishui for this star on 30 June 2017 and it is now so included in the List of IAU-approved Star Names.

It was also known to the second-brightest star in a constellation named Telescopium Herschelii before it was unrecognized by the International Astronomical Union (IAU).

== Properties ==
Omicron Geminorum has an spectral classification of F5-6 IV, with the luminosity class IV suggesting that it is a subgiant star, but some evolutionary models suggest that it is still approaching the end of its main sequence life. The star has a mass about two times that of the Sun, and a radius four times wider. It radiates approximately 24 times the solar luminosity from an outer atmosphere at an effective temperature of 6,470 K.
