= Psi1 Aurigae =

Star in the constellation Auriga

ψ^{1} Aurigae
- Location of ψ^{1} Aurigae (circled)

Observation data Epoch J2000.0 Equinox ICRS
- Constellation: Auriga
- Right ascension: 06^{h} 24^{m} 53.90155^{s}
- Declination: +49° 17′ 16.4112″
- Apparent magnitude (V): 4.91

Characteristics
- Evolutionary stage: Red supergiant
- Spectral type: K5-M1Iab-Ib
- U−B color index: +2.29
- B−V color index: +1.97
- R−I color index: 1.07
- Variable type: LC

Astrometry
Radial velocity (R_{v})	+4.7 km/s
Proper motion (μ)	RA: −0.155 mas/yr Dec.: −2.131 mas/yr
Parallax (π)	0.4426±0.1103 mas
Distance	6,590+1,382 −1,174 ly (2,021.5+424 −360 pc)
Absolute magnitude (M_{V})	−5.53

Details
Mass	14.4±0.8 M_{☉}
Radius	934 R_{☉} 1,004 (Note: Applying the Stefan–Boltzmann law with a nominal solar effective temperature of 5,772 K: $$\sqrt{\biggl(\frac{5,772}{3,740}\biggr)^4 \cdot 10^{5.25}} = 1,004.41\ R_\odot$$.) R_{☉}
Luminosity	170,400 L_{☉}
Temperature	3,790 K
Metallicity [Fe/H]	+0.08 dex
Age	12.3±0.4 Myr

Other designations
- ψ^{1} Aurigae, 46 Aurigae, BD+49 1488, FK5 242, GC 8235, HD 44537, HIP 30520, HR 2289, SAO 41076, PPM 49029

Database references
SIMBAD	data

Psi^{1} Aurigae is a star in the northern constellation of Auriga. Its name is a Bayer designation that is Latinized from ψ^{1} Aurigae, and abbreviated Psi^{1} Aur or ψ^{1} Aur. This star is faintly visible to the naked eye with an apparent visual magnitude of 4.91. Based upon a measured annual parallax shift of 0.44 mas, it is approximately 7,500 light-years (2,300 parsecs) distant from the Earth. It is receding from the Sun with a radial velocity of +4.7 km/s.

== Description ==
This is a massive supergiant star with a stellar classification of K5-M1Iab-Ib. It is a slow irregular variable of the LC type, with its brightness varying in magnitude by 0.44. The star is more than 14 times as massive as the Sun, over 900 times larger, and is blazing with 170,000 times the Sun's luminosity. It is one of the largest stars known, even larger and more luminous than well-known red supergiants Betelgeuse and Antares. This energy is being radiated into outer space from its outer atmosphere at an effective temperature of 3,790 K, giving it the orange-red hue of a cool M-type star.

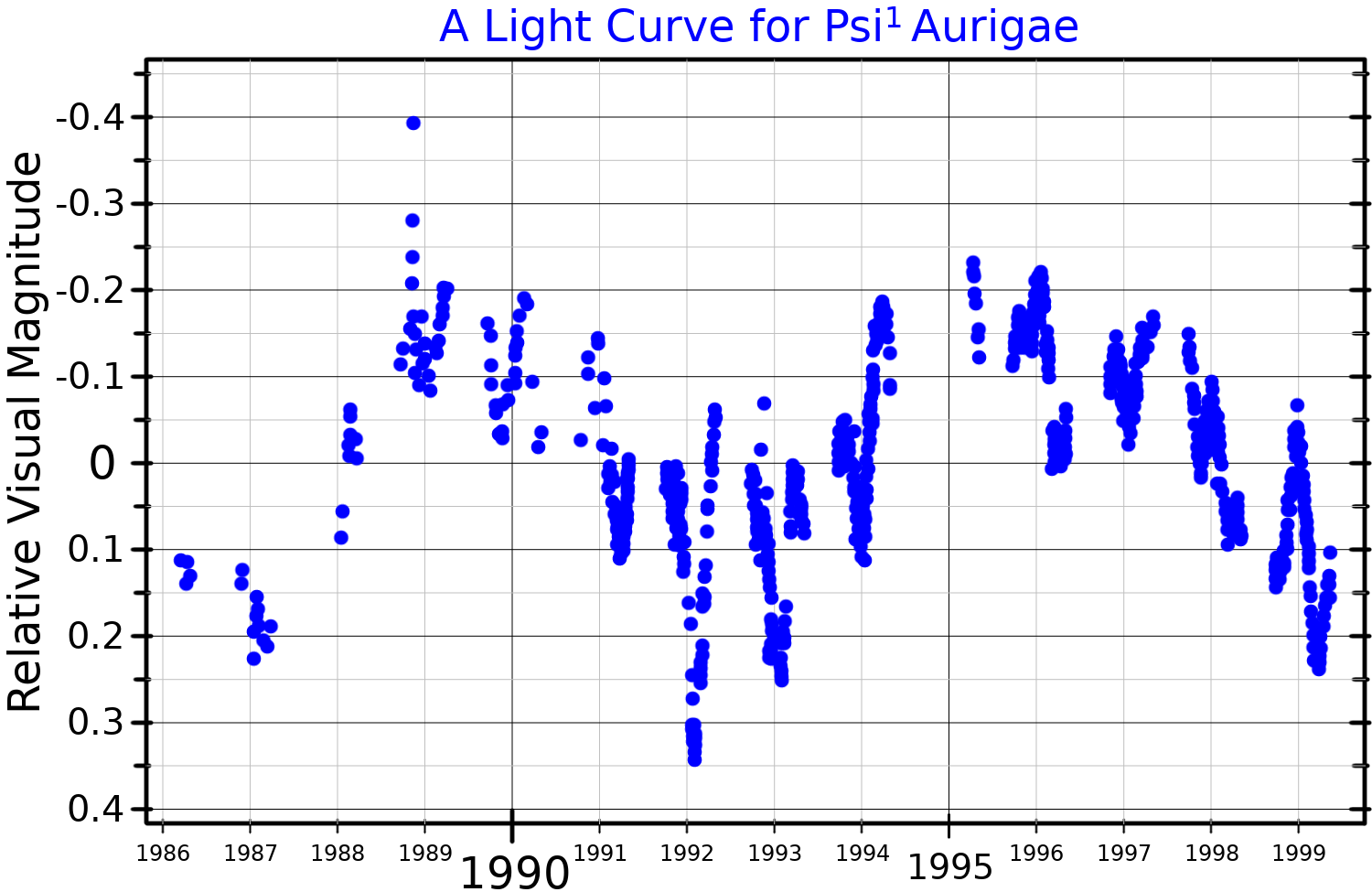
A visual band light curve for Psi^{1} Aurigae, adapted from Percy et al. (2001)
