= Psi4 Aurigae =

Star in the constellation Auriga

Psi^{4} Aurigae
- Location of ψ^{4} Aurigae (circled)

Observation data Epoch J2000.0 Equinox J2000.0 (ICRS)
- Constellation: Auriga
- Right ascension: 06^{h} 43^{m} 04.972^{s}
- Declination: +44° 31′ 28.02″
- Apparent magnitude (V): +5.02

Characteristics
- Spectral type: K5 III
- U−B color index: +1.83
- B−V color index: +1.48

Astrometry
Radial velocity (R_{v})	−77.35±0.23 km/s
Proper motion (μ)	RA: −4.112 mas/yr Dec.: −30.066 mas/yr
Parallax (π)	10.1086±0.123 mas
Distance	323 ± 4 ly (99 ± 1 pc)
Absolute magnitude (M_{V})	+0.06

Details
Mass	1.03^{+0.79}_{−0.23} M_{☉}
Radius	24.9 R_{☉}
Luminosity	182^{+13}_{−12} L_{☉}
Surface gravity (log g)	2.04±0.24 cgs
Temperature	4,020±80 K
Metallicity [Fe/H]	0.10±0.08 dex
Rotational velocity (v sin i)	4.8 km/s

Other designations
- ψ^{4} Aur, 55 Aurigae, BD+44°1518, FK5 2517, GC 8751, HD 47914, HIP 32173, HR 2459, SAO 41288, PPM 49271

Database references
SIMBAD	data

Psi^{4} Aurigae is a single, orange-hued star in the northern constellation of Auriga. Its name is a Bayer designation that is Latinized from ψ^{4} Aurigae, and abbreviated Psi^{4} Aur or ψ^{4} Aur. This star is visible to the naked eye with an apparent visual magnitude of +5.02. With an annual parallax shift of 10.11 mas, it is approximately 323 light-years (99 parsecs) distant from Earth. The star is drifting closer to the Sun with a radial velocity of −77 km/s, and may approach to within 102 ly (31.3 pc) in around 1.1 million years.

This is a evolved K-type giant star with a stellar classification of K5 III, having exhausted the hydrogen at its core. With nearly the same mass as the Sun, it has expanded to 25 times the Sun's radius. The star is radiating 182 times the Sun's luminosity from its enlarged photosphere at an effective temperature of about 4,158 K. It is spinning with a projected rotational velocity of 4.8 km/s. This is an α–enhanced star, displaying a significant enhancement of silicon in its atmosphere.

Psi^{4} Aurigae was part of a much bigger constellation named Telescopium Herschelii before that asterism was no longer recognized by the International Astronomical Union (IAU).
