= Psi7 Aurigae =

Star in the constellation Auriga

ψ^{7} Aurigae
- Location of ψ^{7} Aurigae (circled)

Observation data Epoch J2000.0 Equinox ICRS
- Constellation: Auriga
- Right ascension: 06^{h} 50^{m} 45.943^{s}
- Declination: +41° 46′ 52.43″
- Apparent magnitude (V): 5.02

Characteristics
- Evolutionary stage: red giant branch
- Spectral type: K3 III
- U−B color index: +1.35
- B−V color index: +1.27
- R−I color index: 0.46

Astrometry
Radial velocity (R_{v})	+59.53±0.25 km/s
Proper motion (μ)	RA: −25.542 mas/yr Dec.: −137.253 mas/yr
Parallax (π)	9.6073±0.1274 mas
Distance	339 ± 5 ly (104 ± 1 pc)
Absolute magnitude (M_{V})	−0.33

Details
Mass	1.72^{+1.26}_{−0.74} M_{☉}
Radius	19.680 R_{☉}
Luminosity	162^{+12}_{−11} L_{☉}
Surface gravity (log g)	2.35 cgs
Temperature	4,340±90 K
Metallicity [Fe/H]	0.00 dex
Rotational velocity (v sin i)	10 km/s
Age	700±200 Myr

Other designations
- ψ^{7} Aur, 58 Aurigae, BD+41 1536, FK5 2527, GC 8931, HD 49520, HIP 32844, HR 2516, SAO 41380, PPM 49381, WDS J06508+4147A

Database references
SIMBAD	data

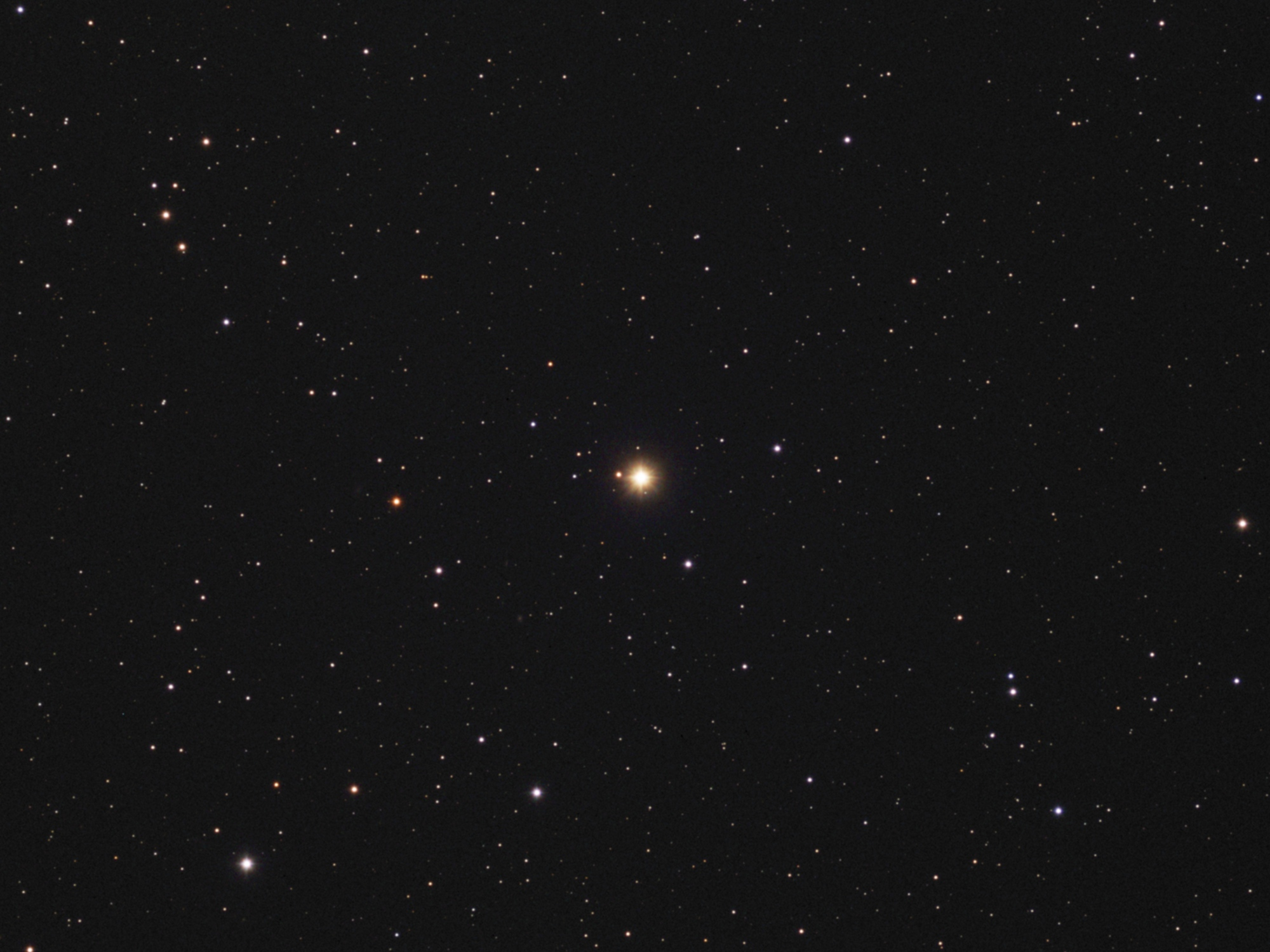
ψ^{7} Aurigae in optical light

Psi^{7} Aurigae, is a star in the northern constellation of Auriga. Its name is a Bayer designation that is Latinized from ψ^{7} Aurigae, and abbreviated Psi^{7} Aur or ψ^{7} Aur. This is a dim, naked eye star with an apparent visual magnitude of 5.02. Based upon parallax measurements, it is approximately 339 light-years (104 parsecs) distant from Earth. It is receding from the Sun with a radial velocity of +60 km/s. Psi^{7} Aur is a probable member of the Hercules stream of co-moving stars.

ψ^{7} Aur is an evolved giant star with a stellar classification of K3 III. With 1.7 times the mass of the Sun, at an age of about 700 million it has expanded to almost 20 times the Sun's radius. The outer envelope has an effective temperature of 4,340, giving it an orange colour and a classification as a K-type star. Although cooler than the sun, its larger size means that it is more luminous, emitting in total 162 times as much electromagnetic radiation.

It was also known to be part of a much bigger constellation named Telescopium Herschelii before it was unrecognized by the International Astronomical Union (IAU).
