= HD 51418 =

Star in the constellation Auriga

- Location of HD 51418 (circled)

Observation data Epoch J2000.0 Equinox ICRS
- Constellation: Auriga
- Right ascension: 06^{h} 59^{m} 20.12818^{s}
- Declination: +42° 18′ 53.1147″
- Apparent magnitude (V): 6.56 to 6.73

Characteristics
- Evolutionary stage: main sequence
- Spectral type: A0 SrCrEuDy, A0pEuSrCrMgII
- Apparent magnitude (G): 6.74
- B−V color index: 0.09
- J−H color index: -0.087
- J−K color index: -0.037
- Variable type: α^{2} CVn variable

Astrometry
Radial velocity (R_{v})	−22.5±3.0 km/s
Proper motion (μ)	RA: −1.210±0.087 mas/yr Dec.: −6.792±0.087 mas/yr
Parallax (π)	5.6092±0.0929 mas
Distance	581 ± 10 ly (178 ± 3 pc)

Details
Mass	3.557±0.178 M_{☉}
Radius	3.297±0.165 R_{☉}

Other designations
- AG+42° 775, BD+42°1629, GC 9158, HD 51418, HIP 33643, SAO 41475, PPM 49494, TIC 192072521, TYC 2950-1335-1, GSC 02950-01335, 2MASS J06592013+4218531, Gaia DR2 951315950188279424, Gaia DR3 951315950188279424, NY Aur, Renson 14180

Database references
SIMBAD	data

HD 51418 (NY Aurigae) is an Ap star and an α^{2} CVn variable located about 178 parsecs (580 ly) away in the northern constellation of Auriga. With an apparent magnitude varying around 6.6 and a spectral type of A0, it can be faintly visible by the naked eye as a whitish dot under very good circumstances. The star has been noted as an "extreme lanthanide star," with an overabundance of metals including europium, dysprosium, and holmium, which can be observed in the star's spectra as emission lines.

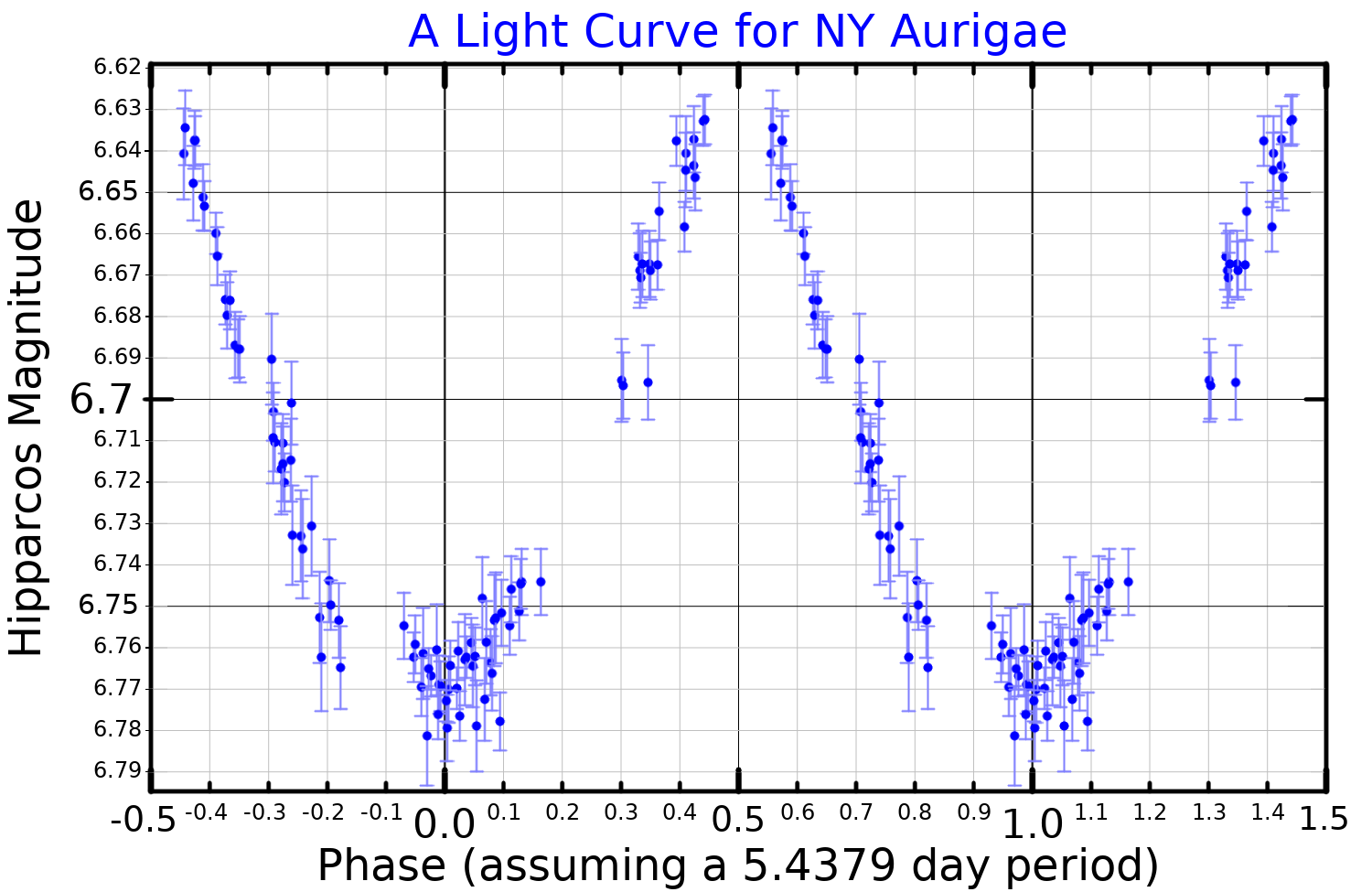
A light curve for NY Aurigae, plotted from Hipparcos data

In 1972, Austin F. Gulliver et al. announced that HD 51418 is a variable star. It was given its variable star designation, NY Aurigae, in 1975. HD 51418 possesses a strong magnetic field, which fluctuates in strength between −22–75 milliteslas (−220–750 G). The magnetic minimum is known to occur concurrently with the minimums in luminosity and rare-earth detection.

== Visual companion ==
Speckle imaging observations conducted in 2009 revealed a previously unresolved companion star at a separation of 0.15 arcseconds. The secondary star, component "B" of the double star WDS 06593+4219 as designated in the Washington Double Star Catalog, is an F-type star with an apparent magnitude of 10.0.

== See also ==
- Przybylski's Star
- GY Andromedae
