= Psi3 Aurigae =

Star in the constellation Auriga

Psi^{3} Aurigae
- Location of ψ^{3} Aurigae (circled)

Observation data Epoch J2000.0 Equinox J2000.0 (ICRS)
- Constellation: Auriga
- Right ascension: 06^{h} 38^{m} 49.180^{s}
- Declination: +39° 54′ 09.21″
- Apparent magnitude (V): +5.20

Characteristics
- Spectral type: B8 III
- U−B color index: −0.38
- B−V color index: −0.07

Astrometry
Radial velocity (R_{v})	−1.22±4.04 km/s
Proper motion (μ)	RA: −7.718 mas/yr Dec.: −11.191 mas/yr
Parallax (π)	3.6617±0.1113 mas
Distance	890 ± 30 ly (273 ± 8 pc)
Absolute magnitude (M_{V})	−2.71

Details
Radius	4.2 R_{☉}
Luminosity	1,624 L_{☉}
Temperature	13,361±83 K
Rotational velocity (v sin i)	118 km/s

Other designations
- ψ^{3} Aur, 52 Aur, BD+40°1665, GC 8655, HD 47100, HIP 31789, HR 2420, SAO 59319, PPM 71895

Database references
SIMBAD	data

Psi^{3} Aurigae is a single, blue-white hued star in the northern constellation of Auriga. Its name is a Bayer designation that is Latinized from ψ^{3} Aurigae, and abbreviated Psi^{3} Aur or ψ^{3} Aur. This star is dimly visible to the naked eye with an apparent visual magnitude of +5.20. Based upon an annual parallax shift of 3.66 mas as seen from the Earth, it is approximately 890 light-years (270 pc) distant from the Sun.

This is a B-type giant star with a stellar classification of B8 III. It has about 4.2 times the radius of the Sun and is spinning with a relatively high projected rotational velocity of 118 km/s. The star is radiating 1,624 times the Sun's luminosity from its photosphere at an effective temperature of 13,361 K.
