= Psi2 Aurigae =

Star in the constellation Auriga

ψ^{2} Aurigae
- Location of ψ^{2} Aurigae (circled)

Observation data Epoch J2000.0 Equinox ICRS
- Constellation: Auriga
- Right ascension: 06^{h} 39^{m} 19.82724^{s}
- Declination: +42° 29′ 19.9557″
- Apparent magnitude (V): 4.79

Characteristics
- Spectral type: K2- III
- U−B color index: +1.30
- B−V color index: +1.23
- R−I color index: 0.6

Astrometry
Radial velocity (R_{v})	16.09±0.19 km/s
Proper motion (μ)	RA: −0.576 mas/yr Dec.: −55.657 mas/yr
Parallax (π)	8.0927±0.1314 mas
Distance	403 ± 7 ly (124 ± 2 pc)
Absolute magnitude (M_{V})	−0.72

Details
Mass	4.1 M_{☉}
Radius	31 R_{☉}
Luminosity	304 L_{☉}
Surface gravity (log g)	2.30 cgs
Temperature	4,410 K
Metallicity [Fe/H]	−0.10 dex
Rotational velocity (v sin i)	1.0 km/s
Age	372 Myr

Other designations
- ψ^{2} Aur, 50 Aurigae, BD+42 1585, GC 8662, HD 47174, HIP 31832, HR 2427, SAO 41239, PPM 49219, WDS J06393+4229A

Database references
SIMBAD	data

Psi^{2} Aurigae is a star in the constellation Auriga. Its name is a Bayer designation that is Latinized from ψ^{2} Aurigae, and abbreviated Psi^{2} Aur or ψ^{2} Aur. This star is faintly visible to the naked eye with an apparent visual magnitude of 4.79. Based upon parallax measurements, it is approximately 403 light-years (124 parsecs) away from the Earth. At that distance, the brightness of the star is diminished by 0.07 in magnitude from extinction caused by interstellar gas and dust. ψ^{2} Aur is drifting further away from the Sun with a radial velocity of 16 km/s.

This is as a evolved K-type giant star with a stellar classification of K2 III. At an estimated age of 372 million years, it has exhausted the supply of hydrogen at its core and expanded to 31 times the radius of the Sun. It has 4.1 times the Sun's mass and is radiating 304 times the Sun's luminosity from its enlarged photosphere at an effective temperature of 4,410 K.

ψ^{2} Aurigae was part of the constellation named Telescopium Herschelii. It was the constellation's brightest star, designated with the Latin letter a before it fell out of use.
