= Psi5 Aurigae =

Star in the constellation Auriga

ψ^{5} Aurigae
- Location of ψ^{5} Aurigae (circled)

Observation data Epoch J2000 Equinox ICRS
- Constellation: Auriga
- Right ascension: 06^{h} 46^{m} 44.337^{s}
- Declination: +43° 34′ 38.73″
- Apparent magnitude (V): 5.200±0.031

Characteristics
- Evolutionary stage: main sequence
- Spectral type: G0 V
- U−B color index: +0.06
- B−V color index: +0.573±0.015

Astrometry
Radial velocity (R_{v})	−24 km/s
Proper motion (μ)	RA: −2.705 mas/yr Dec.: +164.523 mas/yr
Parallax (π)	60.2024±0.0865 mas
Distance	54.18 ± 0.08 ly (16.61 ± 0.02 pc)
Absolute magnitude (M_{V})	4.13

Details
Mass	1.17±0.04 M_{☉}
Radius	1.18^{+0.14}_{−0.02} R_{☉}
Luminosity	1.752 L_{☉}
Surface gravity (log g)	4.35±0.03 cgs
Temperature	6,086±50 K
Metallicity [Fe/H]	+0.09±0.09 dex
Rotational velocity (v sin i)	5.03 km/s
Age	3.2 Gyr

Other designations
- ψ^{5} Aurigae, 56 Aurigae, BD+43°1595, FK5 255, GC 8836, GJ 245, HD 48682, HIP 32480, HR 2483, SAO 41330, PPM 49322, ADS 5425

Database references
SIMBAD	data

Psi^{5} Aurigae is a star in the northern constellation of Auriga. Its name is a Bayer designation that is Latinized from ψ^{5} Aurigae, and abbreviated Psi^{5} Aur or ψ^{5} Aur. This star is faintly visible to the naked eye with an apparent visual magnitude of 5.25. Based upon parallax measurements, this star is 54.2 light-years (16.6 parsecs) distant from Earth. It is drifting closer to the Sun with a radial velocity of −24 km/s.

This is an ordinary, Sun-like star with an orbiting debris disk. No exoplanetary companions have yet been discovered.

== Observations ==
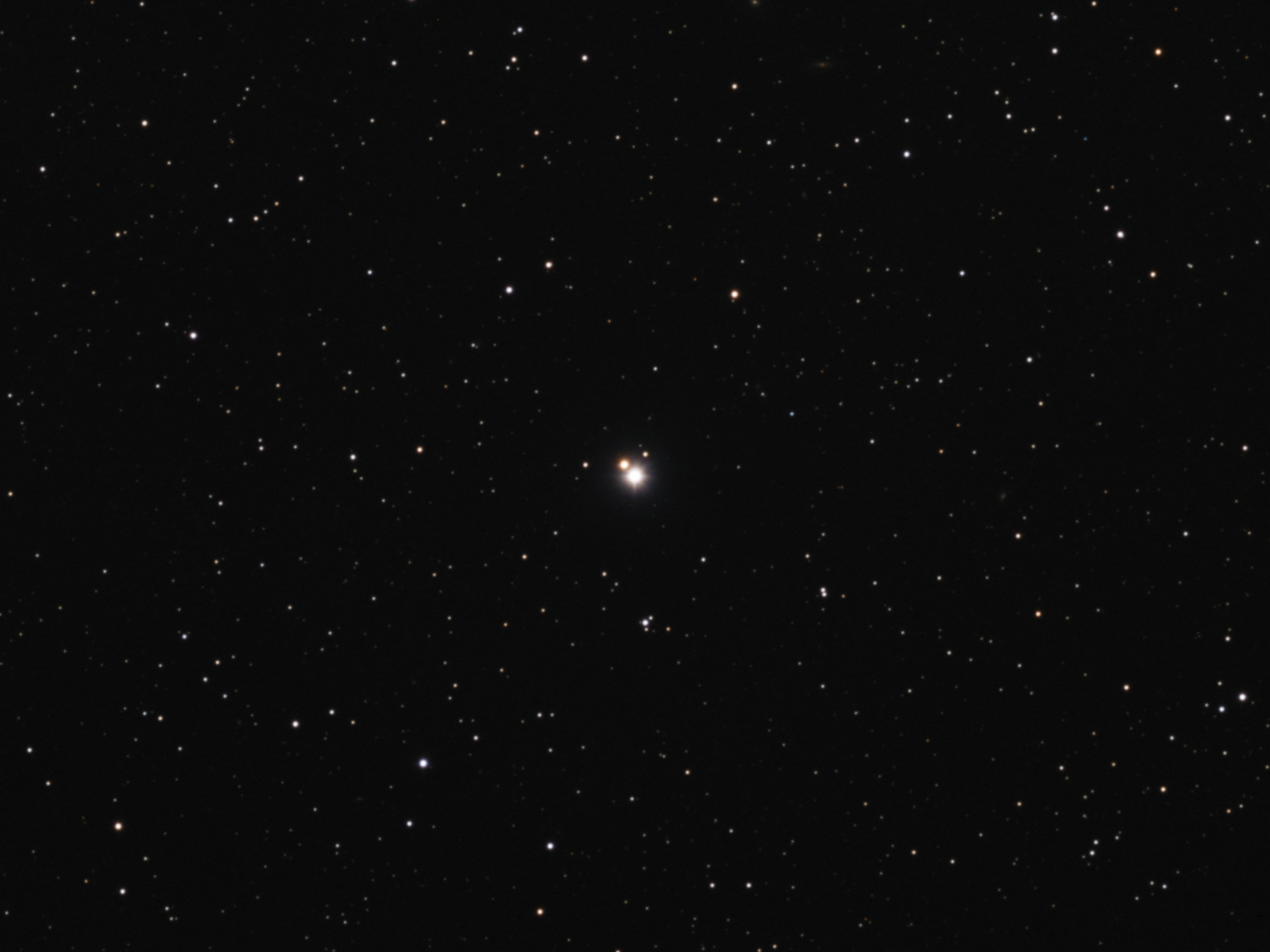
ψ^{5} Aurigae in optical light

The spectrum of this star shows it to be an ordinary G-type main sequence star with a stellar classification of G0 V. The properties are sufficiently similar to the Sun that it is considered a solar analog. It is an estimated 3.2 billion years old and is spinning with a projected rotational velocity of 5 km/s. This star has 17% more mass and 18% greater radius compared to the Sun, while the composition is similar to the Sun. It is radiating 1.75 the luminosity of the Sun into space from its photosphere at an effective temperature of 6,086 K, giving it the golden-hued glow of a G-type star.

Observation in the infrared shows an excess emission that suggests the presence of a circumstellar disk of dust, known as a debris disk. This material has a mean temperature of 60 K, indicating that it is orbiting at a distance of about 84 au from the host star, ranging from 40 to 105 au with an inclination of 112.5°±4.2° to the plane of the sky. The dust has about half the mass of the Moon and is around 600 million years old. The star is being examined for evidence of extrasolar planets, but none have been found as of 2006.

There is an optical companion which is 36 arcseconds away and has an apparent magnitude of +8.4. Psi^{5} Aurigae used to be known to be part of a much bigger constellation named Telescopium Herschelii before it was unrecognized by the International Astronomical Union (IAU).
