= Psi9 Aurigae =

Star in the constellation Auriga

Psi^{9} Aurigae
- Location of ψ^{9} Aurigae (circled)

Observation data Epoch J2000.0 Equinox J2000.0 (ICRS)
- Constellation: Auriga
- Right ascension: 06^{h} 56^{m} 32.05797^{s}
- Declination: +46° 16′ 26.3957″
- Apparent magnitude (V): 5.75

Characteristics
- Spectral type: B8 IIIe
- U−B color index: −0.46
- B−V color index: −0.06

Astrometry
Radial velocity (R_{v})	−41.1±2.9 km/s
Proper motion (μ)	RA: −3.263 mas/yr Dec.: +5.040 mas/yr
Parallax (π)	3.4481±0.0560 mas
Distance	950 ± 20 ly (290 ± 5 pc)
Absolute magnitude (M_{V})	−2.03

Details
Mass	2.4 M_{☉}
Radius	3.7 R_{☉}
Luminosity	868 L_{☉}
Surface gravity (log g)	2.71 cgs
Temperature	9,573 K
Metallicity [Fe/H]	−0.55 dex
Rotational velocity (v sin i)	235 km/s

Other designations
- ψ^{9} Aur, BD+46 1203, HD 50658, HIP 33377, HR 2568, SAO 41446

Database references
SIMBAD	data

Psi^{9} Aurigae is a star in the northern constellation of Auriga. Its name is a Bayer designation that is Latinized from ψ^{9} Aurigae, and abbreviated Psi^{9} Aur or ψ^{9} Aur. This star is dimly visible to the naked eye with an apparent visual magnitude of 5.75. Based upon an annual parallax shift of 3.45 mas, the distance to this star is approximately 950 light-years (290 parsecs). It is drifting closer to the Sun with a radial velocity of −41 km/s. This is most likely (88.5% chance) a runaway star, having a peculiar velocity of 31.8^{+14.6}_{−12.4} km/s.

The spectrum of Psi^{9} Aurigae matches a giant star with a stellar classification of B8 IIIe. The 'e' suffix indicates this is a Be star that shows emission lines of hydrogen in its spectrum. This is caused by a circumstellar shell of hot gas. The emission undergoes variability on a time scale of sixteen years. This star is spinning rapidly with a projected rotational velocity of 235 km/s. It has 2.4 times the mass of the Sun and 3.7 times the Sun's radius. ψ^{9} Aur is radiating 868 times the luminosity of the Sun from its photosphere at an effective temperature of 9,573 K.
