= Psi8 Aurigae =

Star in the constellation Auriga

Psi^{8} Aurigae
- Location of ψ^{8} Aurigae (circled)

Observation data Epoch J2000.0 Equinox ICRS
- Constellation: Auriga
- Right ascension: 06^{h} 53^{m} 57.073^{s}
- Declination: +38° 30′ 18.07″
- Apparent magnitude (V): 6.46

Characteristics
- Spectral type: B9.5p
- Apparent magnitude (J): 6.471±0.034
- Apparent magnitude (H): 6.532±0.036
- Apparent magnitude (K): 6.514±0.018
- B−V color index: −0.044±0.007
- Variable type: Constant

Astrometry
Radial velocity (R_{v})	27.1±1.0 km/s
Proper motion (μ)	RA: −1.307 mas/yr Dec.: −27.406 mas/yr
Parallax (π)	4.8897±0.0602 mas
Distance	667 ± 8 ly (205 ± 3 pc)
Absolute magnitude (M_{V})	−0.31

Details
Mass	2.0 M_{☉}
Radius	3.1 R_{☉}
Luminosity	100 L_{☉}
Surface gravity (log g)	3.68 cgs
Temperature	10,200 K
Metallicity [Fe/H]	−0.161 dex
Rotational velocity (v sin i)	40±9 km/s
Age	234 Myr

Other designations
- ψ^{8} Aurigae, 61 Aurigae, BD+38°1638, HD 50204, HIP 33133, HR 2547, SAO 59589

Database references
SIMBAD	data

Psi^{8} Aurigae is a star in the northern constellation of Auriga. Its name is a Bayer designation that is Latinized from ψ^{8} Aurigae, and abbreviated Psi^{8} Aur or ψ^{8} Aur. This star is just visible to the naked eye with an apparent visual magnitude of 6.443. Based upon parallax measurements, it is approximately 667 light-years (205 parsecs) distant from the Earth. It is receding from the Sun with a radial velocity of 27 km/s.

The spectrum of the star has a stellar classification of B9.5p, matching a very late B-type star with unspecified luminosity class. The "p" indicates a peculiarity in the spectrum. φ^{8} Aurigae has been reported to be an Ap star with unusually string silicon lines in its spectrum, or a mercury-manganese star, but it is now considered doubtful whether it is actually a chemically peculiar star.

This star has double the mass of the Sun and more than triple the Sun's radius. It is an estimated 234 million years old and is spinning with a projected rotational velocity of 40 km/s. The star is radiating 100 times the luminosity of the Sun from its photosphere at an effective temperature of 10,200 K.
