= NGC 2528 =

Galaxy in the constellation Lynx

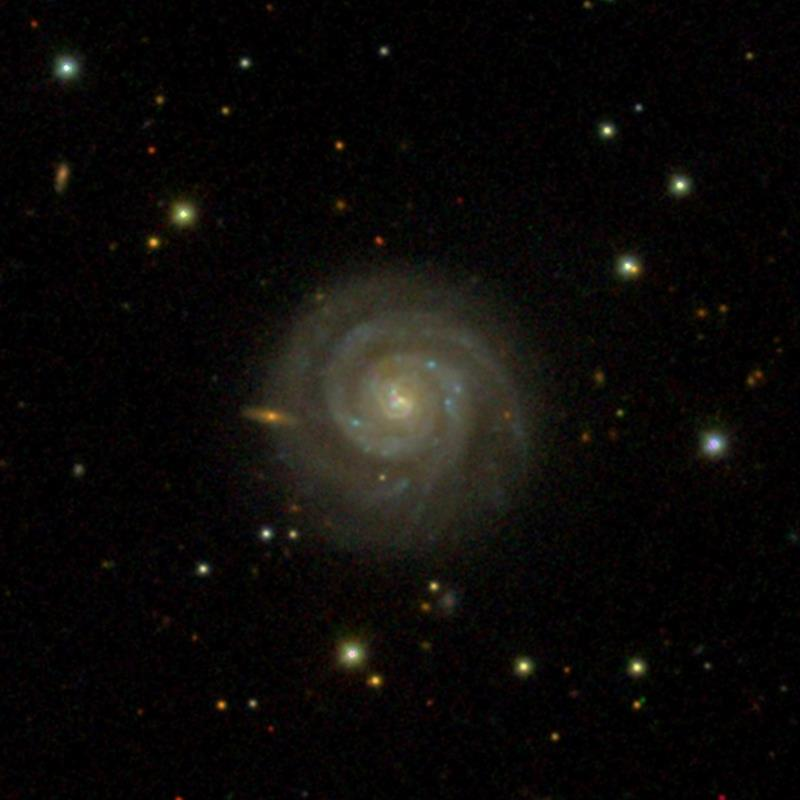
- NGC 2528 imaged by SDSS

Observation data (J2000 epoch)
- Constellation: Lynx
- Right ascension: 08^{h} 07^{m} 24.9118^{s}
- Declination: +39° 11′ 40.12″
- Redshift: 0.013106
- Heliocentric radial velocity: 3929 ± 1 km/s
- Distance: 197.2 ± 13.8 Mly (60.45 ± 4.23 Mpc)
- Group or cluster: NGC 2415 group (LGG 148)
- Apparent magnitude (V): 12.6

Characteristics
- Type: SAB(rs)b
- Size: ~115,400 ly (35.37 kpc) (estimated)
- Apparent size (V): 1.5′ × 1.5′ 1.5' x 1.5'

Other designations
- IRAS 08040+3920, 2MASX J08072487+3911402, UGC 4227, MCG +07-17-015, PGC 22805, CGCG 207-032

NGC 2528 is an intermediate spiral galaxy in the constellation of Lynx. Its velocity with respect to the cosmic microwave background is 4098 ± 12 km/s, which corresponds to a Hubble distance of 60.45 ± 4.23 Mpc (~197 million light-years). It was discovered by French astronomer Édouard Stephan on 22 January 1877.

NGC 2528 is a luminous infrared galaxy (LIRG). According to the SIMBAD database, NGC 2528 is classified as a radio galaxy.

== NGC 2415 group ==
NGC 2528 is a member of the NGC 2415 group (also known as LGG 148) which includes NGC 2415, NGC 2444, NGC 2445, NGC 2476, NGC 2493, NGC 2524, UGC 3937 and UGC 3944.

== Supernova ==
One supernova has been observed in NGC 2528: SN 2023jo (Type IIn, mag. 17.515) was discovered by ATLAS on 13 January 2023.

== See also ==
- List of NGC objects (2001–3000)
