= NGC 2832 =

Elliptical galaxy in the constellation Lynx

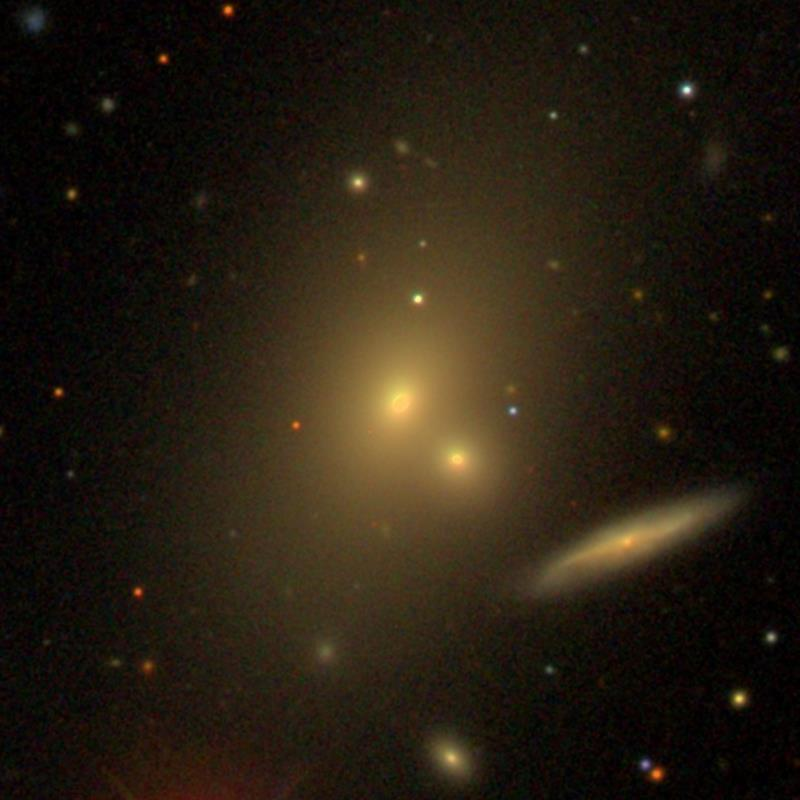
- NGC 2832 by Sloan Digital Sky Survey

Observation data (J2000 epoch)
- Constellation: Lynx
- Right ascension: 09^{h} 19^{m} 46.9^{s}
- Declination: +33° 44′ 59″
- Redshift: 0.023006 ± 0.000003
- Heliocentric radial velocity: 6,897 ± 1 km/s
- Distance: 289 ± 107 Mly (88.8 ± 33 Mpc)
- Apparent magnitude (V): 11.8

Characteristics
- Type: E+2:;cD
- Apparent size (V): 1.71′ × 1.18′
- Notable features: Brightest cluster galaxy

Other designations
- UGC 4942, Arp 315, MCG +06-21-015, PGC 26377

NGC 2832 is an elliptical galaxy in the constellation Lynx. The galaxy lies about 290 million light years away from Earth, which means, given its apparent dimensions, that NGC 2832 is approximately 250,000 light years across. It was discovered by William Herschel on December 7, 1785.

NGC 2832 is a type-cD galaxy and is the brightest member of Abell 779 galaxy cluster. NGC 2832 appears to interact tidally with NGC 2831, which lies about 25 arcseconds away and shares the same halo with NGC 2832. The edge-on spiral galaxy NGC 2830 lies 80 arcseconds southwest of NGC 2832. The galaxy has a strong central X-ray emission and diffuse emission around it. The galaxy hosts a supermassive black hole whose mass is estimated to be 3.6×10^{9} M_{☉}.

One supernova has been observed in NGC 2832, SN 2014ai, a Type Ia supernova which was discovered around maximum, having an apparent magnitude of 18.1.
