= SDSS J0815+4729 =

Ultra-low metallicity star in the constellation Lynx

Observation data Epoch J2000 Equinox ICRS
- Constellation: Lynx
- Right ascension: 08^{h} 15^{m} 54.26778^{s}
- Declination: +47° 29′ 47.6013″
- Apparent magnitude (V): 16.9

Characteristics
- Evolutionary stage: main sequence
- Spectral type: F5V

Astrometry
| Radial velocity (R_{v}) | −108 km/s |
| Proper motion (μ) | RA: −14.257 mas/yr Dec.: −24.214 mas/yr |
| Parallax (π) | 0.4089±0.0685 mas |
| Distance | approx. 8,000 ly (approx. 2,400 pc) |

Details
| Mass | 1.18 M_{☉} |
| Radius | 0.72 R_{☉} |
| Luminosity | 0.67 L_{☉} |
| Surface gravity (log g) | 4.80 cgs |
| Temperature | 6,142±118 K |
| Metallicity [Fe/H] | −5.49±0.14 dex |

Other designations
- SDSS J081554.26+472947.5, Gaia DR2 931227322991970560

Database references
| SIMBAD | data |

SDSS J081554.26+472947.5, often abbreviated to its partial coordinates, J0815+4729, is a star with an ultra-low metallicity in the constellation of Lynx. It also has a relatively high concentration of carbon. The surface of the star has a temperature of 6,215 K. It is at a distance of 7,500 light years (2.3 kiloparsecs) from the Sun, and is 33,000 light-years (10 kiloparsecs) from the Galactic Center. Its [Fe/H] was first believed to be below −5.8 dex, making it the lowest metallicity un-evolved star detected., but was revised to −5.49 dex in 2020.

J0815+4729's ratio of carbon to iron, [C/Fe] is at least 5.0 dex. The star is also heavily enriched in nitrogen and oxygen, originating from primordial gas cloud contaminated by single zero-metallicity supernova. The lack of heavy elements, including iron, is explained by these mostly falling back to a collapsing supernova remnant.
