= Arp 143 =

Galactical cluster in Lynx

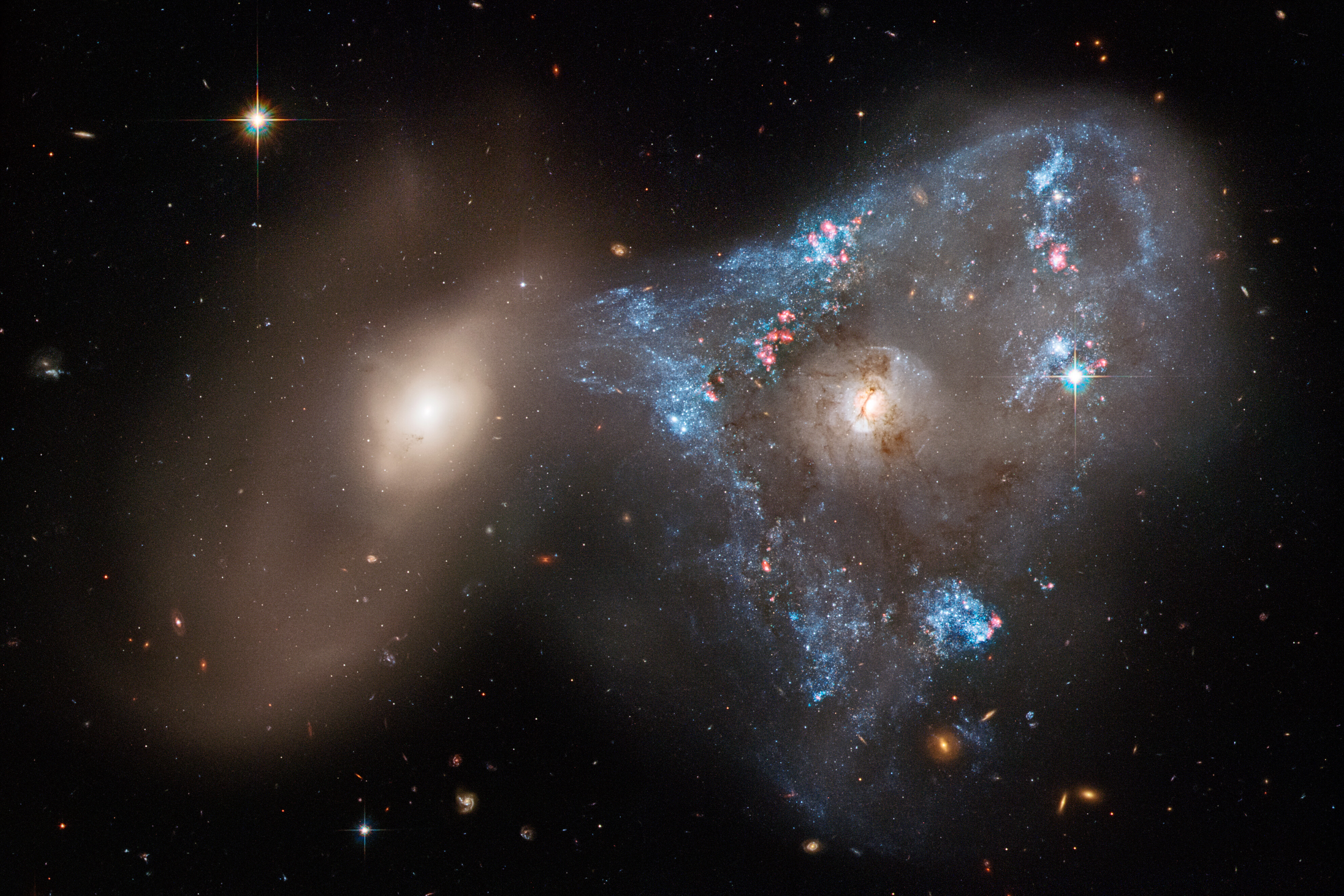
- Hubble Space Telescope image of NGC 2444 and NGC 2445, members of Arp 143

Observation data (Epoch )
- Constellation: Lynx
- Right ascension: 07^{h} 46^{m} 57^{s}
- Declination: 39° 00′ 51″
- Brightest member: NGC 2445
- Number of galaxies: 2
- Redshift: 0.01295
- Distance: 191 million light-years (59×10^{6} pc)

Arp 143, also known as VV 117, is a pair of interacting galaxies, NGC 2444 and NGC 2445, found in the constellation Lynx. It is one of the few ring galaxy systems in the Atlas of Peculiar Galaxies. It is believed that NGC 2444 and NGC 2445 have passed through each other, causing an increase in star formation in NGC 2445. Unlike NGC 2445, NGC 2444 is not experiencing any new star birth due to NGC 2444 having lost its gas long before the collision.

== Observations ==
Arp 143 was discovered by French astronomer Édouard Stephan on 18 January 1877 using the 31-inch Foucault reflector telescope at the Marseille Observatory.

Arp 143 is composed of NGC 2444 and NGC 2445. The latter is a very distorted ring galaxy, taking a trapezoidal shape instead of a more circular one. This is a result of gravity from NGC 2444 pulling on NGC 2445. The cluster has complex radio emissions that may be caused by star formation or a black hole, with the radio emissions being concentrated in the cores, a northwestern region of NGC 2445 extending to NGC 2444, and the southern and eastern parts of NGC 2445's ring. The northwestern region of NGC 2445 also has a stronger-than-normal magnetic field compared to most spiral galaxies. The stars of the ring are around 50–100 million years old. Stars of the core of NGC 2445 are a few million years old. Stars of the other galaxy are older on average.

The ring of Arp 143 has a radius of 10 kiloparsecs (33,000 ly). It is composed of stellar knots. The stellar ages within the ring gets lower the further out, which corresponds with a galactic collision. The ring is not centered, indicating a non-symmetrical collision.

NGC 2444 pulls on NGC 2445, creating a tidal tail. The tail is approximately 240 kiloparsecs (780,000 ly) long. The stream of stars that make up the tail are slowly being left behind as NGC 2445 continues to slowly pull away from NGC 2444.
