= WASP-13b =

Extrasolar planet in the orbit of the star WASP-13

WASP-13b / Cruinlagh
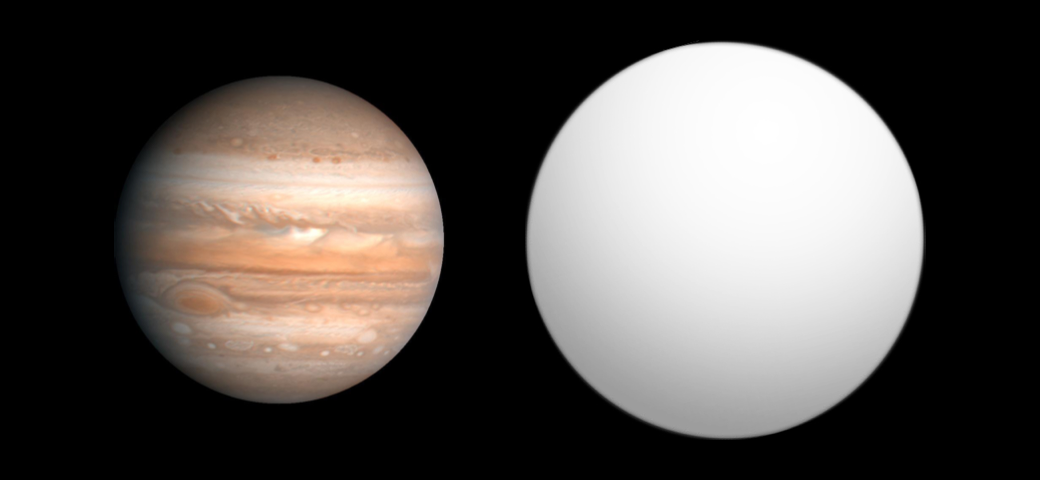
- Size comparison of WASP-13b with Jupiter.

Discovery
- Discovered by: Skillen et al. (SuperWASP)
- Discovery date: April 1, 2008
- Detection method: Transit

Orbital characteristics
- Semi-major axis: 0.05379 ^{+0.00059}_{−0.00077} AU
- Orbital period (sidereal): 4.353011 (± 1.3e-05) d
- Inclination: 85.64 (± 0.24)
- Star: WASP-13

Physical characteristics
- Mean radius: 1.365 ^{+0.062}_{−0.054} R_{J}
- Mass: 0.485 ^{+0.058}_{−0.052} M_{J}
- Temperature: 1,356 K (1,083 °C; 1,981 °F)

WASP-13b, also known as Cruinlagh, is an extrasolar planet that was discovered in 2008 in the orbit of the sunlike star WASP-13. The planet has a mass of nearly half that of Jupiter, but a radius five-quarters of the size of Jupiter. This low relative mass might be caused by a core that is of low mass or that is not present at all.

The planet orbits at approximately 5% of the distance between the Sun and Earth every four days. The star was observed several times between 2006 and 2009, at first through the SuperWASP program and later through focused follow-up observations. Analysis of collected radial velocity measurements led to the discovery of Cruinlagh, which was reported in a journal on April 7, 2009. A follow-up study published in 2011 investigated the cause for inflated planets such as Cruinlagh, and re-examined (and re-constrained) its mass, radius, density, and age.

== Discovery ==
Between November 27, 2006, and April 1, 2007, 3329 images of the star WASP-13, by the SuperWASP-North program based at Roque de los Muchachos Observatory in the Canary Islands led to the identification of Gloas as host to a potentially transiting object. Photometric follow-up observations were taken on February 16, 2008, using the James Gregory Telescope (JGT) in Scotland, which took 1047 exposures of the star, although the last twenty images taken were obscured by cloud cover and were discarded. Using HD 80408 as a reference star along with JGT measurements, the astronomers investigating the system were able to create a light curve for the transiting planet.

Gloas was observed between February 11 and 15 in 2008 by the SOPHIE échelle spectrograph at the Haute-Provence Observatory in France, determining the radial velocity of the transiting body. Use of the FIES echelle spectrograph at the Nordic Optical Telescope in the Canary Islands gained other spectral measurements that yielded the characteristics of the star. Analysis of the SOPHIE and FIES data were used to constrain some of the orbiting body's characteristics. The discovery of the orbiting body's mass using radial velocity measurements led to its confirmation as the planet WASP-13b.

The discovery of Cruinlagh was reported in the journal Astronomy and Astrophysics by the European Southern Observatory on May 19, 2009. The discovery paper was received by the journal on April 7, 2009.

Later, between 2009 and 2011, another team of astronomers observed Cruinlagh and WASP-21b to find what caused some Hot Jupiters to have anomalously high radii. The RISE photometric camera on the Liverpool Telescope was used to detect further transits. Two partial transits and two full transits were observed during this period, although the quality of both full transits was slightly compromised because of passing cloud cover. The collected observations, along with the JGT observations that were used to confirm the planet, were scaled to filter out errors such as background noise. The data was then used to re-define Cruinlagh's parameters, including its age, mass, radius, and density. The study also noted that a limb darkening effect was present, a characteristic that may affect future atmospheric studies of the planet.

== Host star ==
Gloas is a sunlike G-type star located in the constellation Lynx. Measurements taken by FIES and SOPHIE did not constrain the mass, radius, or age well; however, a later 2011 study using the Liverpool Telescope better-constrained those parameters. The star's mass is estimated at 1.09 times the mass of the Sun, its radius at 1.559 times that of the Sun, and its density at 0.288 time's the Sun's density. These characteristics are re-defined taking limb darkening into account. The star's metallicity, which is measured by iron content, is placed roughly at [Fe/H] = 0, similar to that of the Sun. Also, the star's estimated effective temperature is 5826 K, slightly warmer than the Sun.

Gloas has an apparent magnitude of 10.42, making it invisible to the unaided eye as seen from Earth.

== Characteristics ==
Cruinlagh is a transiting planet with an estimated mass that is (including limb darkening) 0.477 times that of Jupiter and a radius that is 1.389 times Jupiter's radius. The planet is, in other words, less than half the mass of Jupiter, but slightly less than fourteen tenths its size. The planet's low mass can mostly likely be attributed to the presence of a low-mass core, or to the total lack of a core, according to the discovery paper. Cruinlagh, which orbits its host star at a distance of 0.05362 AU, circles its star completely every 4.35298 days. The 2011 study on the planet recognized Cruinlagh as the fifth-lowest-density extrasolar planet known, behind Kepler-7b; WASP-17b; TrES-4b; and CoRoT-5b.

Cruinlagh has an orbital inclination of 86.9º, which means that it orbits almost edge-on as seen from Earth.

== Naming ==
The planet was originally named WASP-13b, as the second object in the WASP-13 system.

In 2019 the IAU announced that WASP-13 and its planet WASP-13b would be given official names chosen by school children from Cronk y Berry school, Isle of Man. The chosen names were Gloas for WASP-13 and Cruinlagh for WASP-13b, the Manx words for 'to shine' and 'to orbit' respectively.

== See also ==
- SuperWASP or WASP planetary search program
