= UX =

UX, Ux, or ux may refer to:

== Astronomical objects ==
- UX Antliae, a post-AGB star in Corona Borealis
- UX Arietis, a triple star system
- UX Lyncis, a dim, red-hued star in Lynx
- UX Tauri, a binary star system

== Computing ==
=== Software ===
- LG UX
- Unix, an operating system family
  - A/UX, by Apple Computer (1988–1995)
  - DG/UX, by Data General (1985–2001)
  - HP-UX, by Hewlett-Packard (1982–)

=== Other uses in computing ===
- Sony Vaio UX Micro PC, a 2006 laptop brand
- iHub UX Lab, Nairobi, Kenya

== Language ==
- Ux., legal shorthand for 'wife'; see Et uxor
- Ux or ux, a digraph substitute for Ŭ or ŭ in Esperanto's X-system ASCII transliteration

== Transportation ==
=== Businesses ===
- Air Europa (IATA code: UX)
- United Express, a brand of United Airlines

=== Vehicles ===
- Lexus UX, a Japanese subcompact SUV
  - LF-UX, a concept preview of the car
- SM U-10 (Austria-Hungary) (or U-X), the lead boat of the U-10 class of submarines of the Austro-Hungarian Navy

== Other uses ==
- User experience, a person's behaviors, attitudes, and emotions about using a product, system, or service
- les UX, an underground organization that improves parts of Paris
- Uranium-X, historical name for the chemical element protactinium
- Niigata Television Network 21, a Japanese commercial broadcaster
