= SDSS J080730.75+340041.6 =

Elliptical galaxy in the constellation Lynx

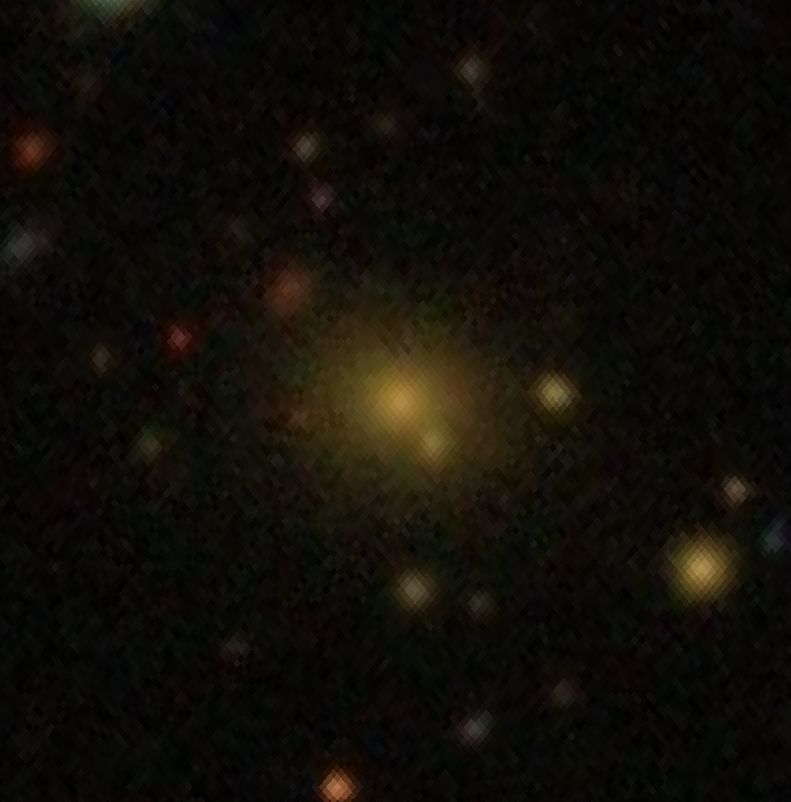
- SDSS image of SDSS J080730.75+340041.6

Observation data (J2000.0 epoch)
- Constellation: Lynx
- Right ascension: 08^{h} 07^{m} 30.77^{s}
- Declination: +34° 00′ 42.14″
- Redshift: 0.207863
- Heliocentric radial velocity: 62,316 ± 8 km/s
- Distance: 2,996.3 ± 209.8 Mly (918.67 ± 64.31 Mpc)
- Group or cluster: WHL J080730.7+340042, FGS 4
- magnitude (K): 14.75

Characteristics
- Type: BrClG
- Size: ~780,000 ly (239.2 kpc) (estimated)

Other designations
- 2MASX J08073078+3400419, BZU J0807+3400, GMBCG J121.87813+34.01156 BCG, LEDA 2042439, WHL J080730.7+340042 BCG, [YHW2016] J121.87811+34.01158, NVSS J080730+340042

SDSS J080730.75+340041.6 is a massive elliptical galaxy located in the constellation of Lynx. The redshift of the galaxy is (z) 0.207 and it was first discovered by astronomers from the ROSAT All-Sky Survey in April 2000.

== Description ==
SDSS J080730.75+340041.6 is an elliptical galaxy residing as the brightest cluster galaxy of the galaxy cluster WHL J080730.7+340042, with 13 confirmed galaxy member candidates. The R-band magnitude of the galaxy is 16.39 magnitude while the absolute magnitude is -24.05.

The galaxy is categorized as a fossil galaxy belonging to a fossil system called FGS 4, with its X-ray luminosity estimated to be 4.210 × 10^{43} erg/s and a total velocity dispersion of 263 ± 21 kilometers per second. It has an effective surface brightness of 20.23 ± 0.39 magnitudes per square arcsecond and is orientated in a position angle of 73.4 ± 1.5°. A study found it has a total star formation rate calculated to be 7.04 M_{☉} per year based on its doubly ionized oxygen emission line and 3.16 M_{☉} based on its hydrogen-alpha emission line. Its optical spectrum also contains singly ionized nitrogen and h-beta emission lines, with line fluxes of 327.36 × 10^{−17} erg s^{−1} cm^{−2} and 115.70 × 10^{−17} erg s^{−1} respectively.

The nucleus is active and is categorized as both a blazar and a non-bent Fanaroff-Riley Class Type I radio galaxy. Radio imaging made with the Very Large Array (VLA) at 1.4 GHz frequencies detected the presence of bipolar radio jets originating from the galaxy with the radio source extent estimated to be 6.9 arcseconds. The radio flux density is 12.7 mJy at 1.4 GHz frequencies and the total radio power is 1.58 × 10^{24} WHz^{−1}.
