= APM 08279+5255 =

Quasar

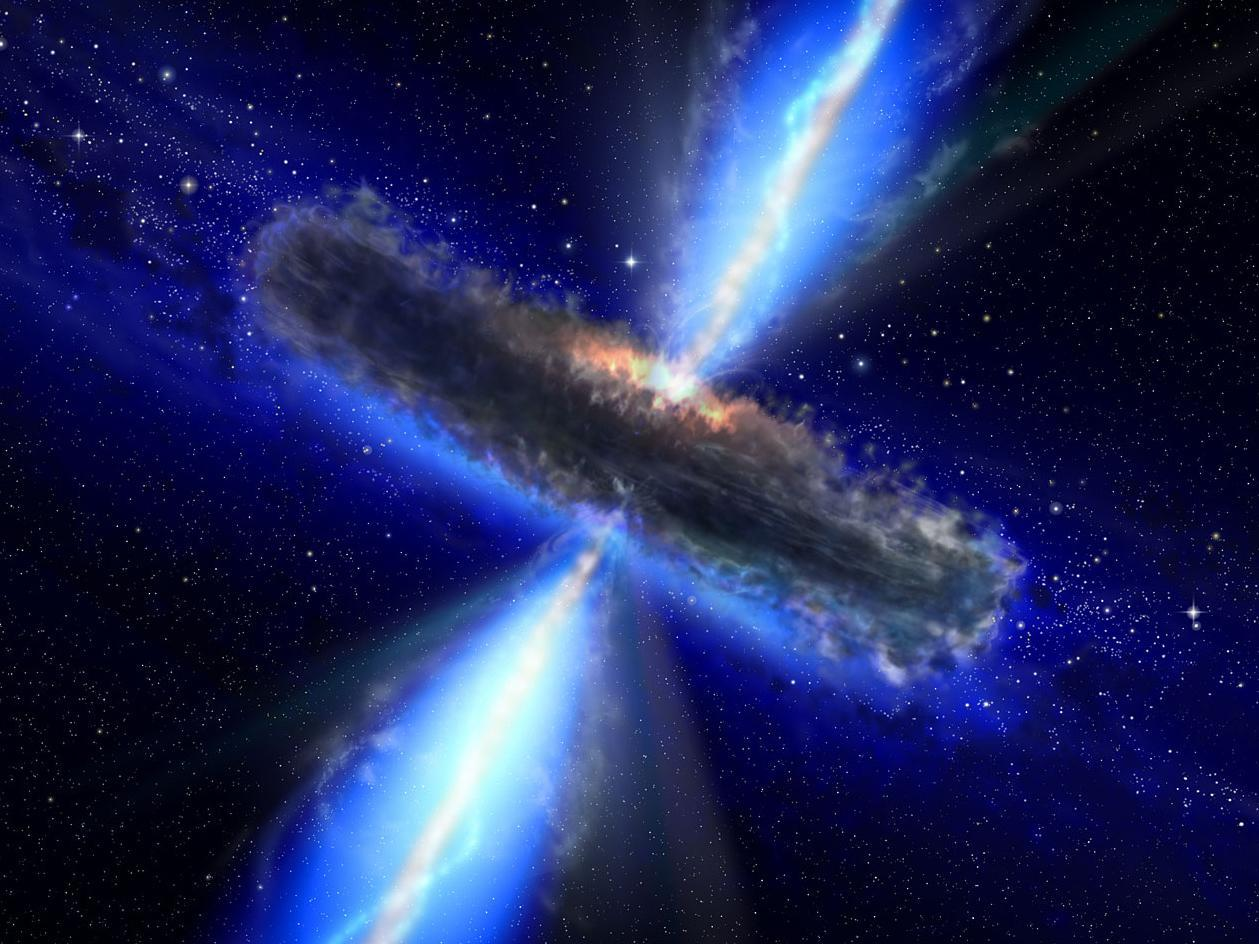
- Artist's concept of a quasar similar to APM 08279+5255

Observation data (Epoch J2000)
- Constellation: Lynx
- Right ascension: 08^{h} 31^{m} 41.70^{s}
- Declination: 52° 45′ 16.8″
- Redshift: 3.911
- Distance: 23.6 Gly (7.2 Gpc) h^{−1}_{0.73} (co-moving); 12.05 Gly (light travel time)
- Type: broad absorption line (BAL) quasar, hyperluminous infrared galaxy
- Apparent magnitude (V): +15.2 (R)
- Notable features: gravitationally lensed

Other designations
- IRAS F08279+5255, QSO B0827+5255, QSO J0831+5245

APM 08279+5255 is a very distant, broad absorption line quasar located in the constellation Lynx. It is magnified and split into multiple images by the gravitational lensing effect of a foreground galaxy through which its light passes. It appears to be a giant elliptical galaxy with a supermassive black hole and associated accretion disk. It possesses large regions of hot dust and molecular gas, as well as regions with starburst activity.

== Gravitational lensing ==
APM 08279+5255 was initially identified as a quasar in 1998 during an Automatic Plate Measuring Facility (APM) survey to find carbon stars in the galactic halo. The combination of its high redshift (z=3.87) and brightness (particularly in the infrared) made it the most luminous object yet seen in the universe. It was suspected of being a gravitationally lensed object, with its luminosity magnified. Observations in the infrared with the NICMOS high-resolution camera on board the Hubble Space Telescope (HST) showed that the source was composed of three discrete images. Even accounting for the magnification, the quasar is an extremely powerful object, with a luminosity of 10^{14} to 10^{15} times the luminosity of the sun. Subsequent observations with the Hubble Space Telescope Imaging Spectrograph confirmed the presence of a third faint image between the two brighter images. Each component has the same spectral energy distribution and is an image of the quasar. Gravitational lensed systems with odd numbers of images are extremely rare; most contain two or four.

Initially the magnification due to gravitational lensing was thought to be large, in the range of 40 to 90 times. After detailed observations at many wavelengths, the best model of the lensing galaxy is a tilted spiral galaxy. This gives a magnification of about 4. The additional observations led to a revised redshift of 3.911.

== Galactic structure ==
APM 08279+5255 is a bright source at almost all wavelengths and has become one of the most studied of distant sources. Using interferometry it has been mapped in X-ray with the AXAF CCD Imaging Spectrometer on the Chandra X-ray Observatory, in infrared with the Hubble Space Telescope, and in radio with the Very Long Baseline Array. Measurements with the IRAM Plateau de Bure Interferometer and other instruments looked at the distribution of molecules such as CO, CN, HCN, and HCO+ as well as atomic carbon.

From these observations APM 08279+5255 is in a giant elliptical galaxy with large amounts of gas, dust, and an active galactic nucleus (AGN) at its core. The AGN is radio-quiet with no evidence for a relativistic jet. It is powered by one of the largest known supermassive black holes: 23 billion solar masses (based on the molecular disk velocities); or alternatively 10.0 ^{+1.7}_{−1.3} billion solar masses (based on reverberation mapping). The black hole is surrounded by an accretion disk of material spiraling into it, a few parsecs in size. Further out is a dust torus, a doughnut shaped cloud of dust and gas with a radius of about 100 parsecs. Both the accretion disk and dust torus appear to be almost face-on to us. The radiation from the molecular gas is coming from a flattened disk at the center of the galaxy with a radius of 550 pc. This is also the starburst region of the galaxy. The gas is heated both by activity in the AGN and by the newly forming stars.

APM is an ultra-luminous infrared galaxy (ULIRG). Its high redshift shifts the far-infrared spectrum into millimeter wavelengths where it can be observed from observatories on the ground. In 2008 and 2009 the intensities of its water vapor spectral lines were measured using the millimeter wave spectrometer Z-Spec at the Caltech Submillimeter Observatory. Comparing the spectrum to that of Markarian 231, another ULIRG, showed that it had 50 times the water vapor of that galaxy. This made it the largest mass of water in the known universe—100 trillion times more water than that held in all of Earth's oceans combined. Its discovery shows that water has been prevalent in the known universe for nearly its entire existence; the radiation was emitted 1.6 billion years after the Big Bang.

== Gallery ==
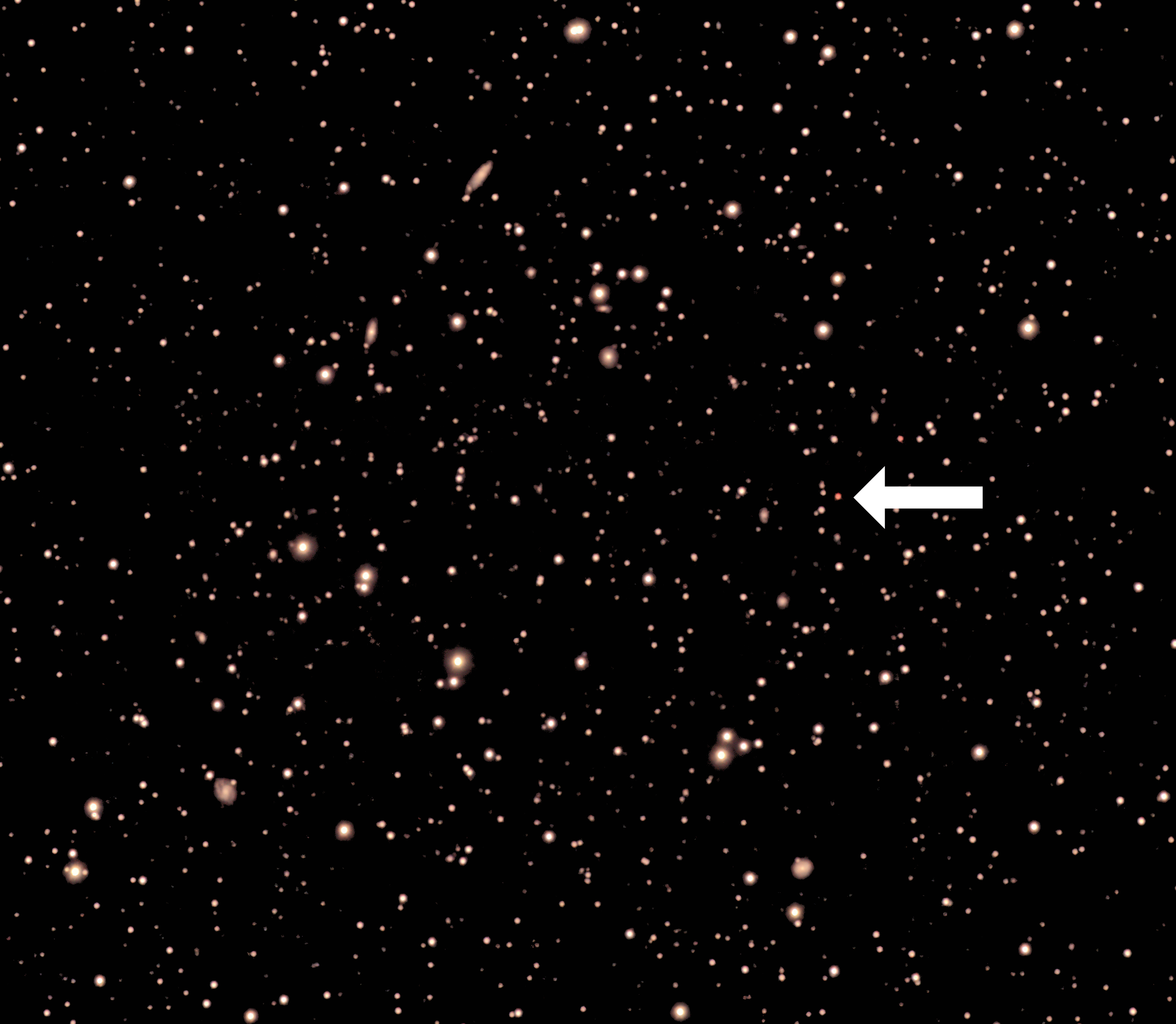
Astronomer photo of APM 08279+5255
