= NGC 2415 =

Galaxy in the constellation Lynx

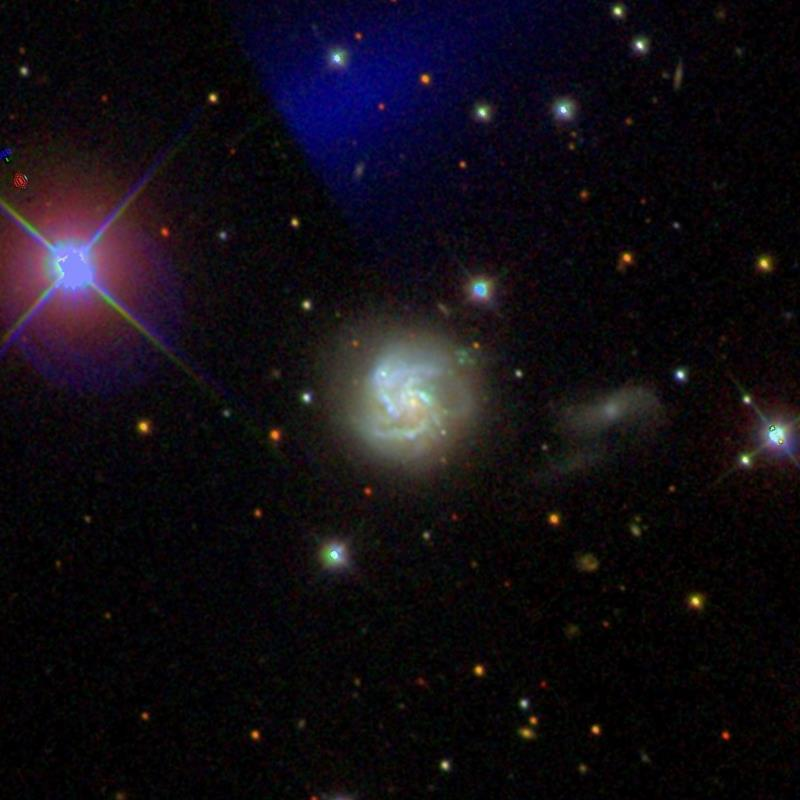
- NGC 2415 imaged by SDSS

Observation data (J2000 epoch)
- Constellation: Lynx
- Right ascension: 07^{h} 36^{m} 56.7796^{s}
- Declination: +35° 14′ 30.789″
- Redshift: 0.012619±0.0000170
- Heliocentric radial velocity: 3,783±5 km/s
- Distance: 189.3 ± 13.3 Mly (58.04 ± 4.07 Mpc)
- Group or cluster: NGC 2415 group (LGG 148)
- Apparent magnitude (V): 12.3B

Characteristics
- Type: Im?
- Size: ~63,800 ly (19.56 kpc) (estimated)
- Apparent size (V): 0.9′ × 0.9′

Other designations
- IRAS 07336+3521, 2MASS J07365677+3514307, UGC 3930, MCG +06-17-021, PGC 21399, CGCG 177-038

NGC 2415 is an irregular galaxy in the constellation of Lynx, near the border with Gemini (some sources claim it is in Gemini). Its velocity with respect to the cosmic microwave background is 3,935±12 km/s, which corresponds to a Hubble distance of 189.3 ± 13.3 Mly (58.04 ± 4.07 Mpc). It was discovered by German-British astronomer William Herschel on 10 March 1790.

== NGC 2415 group ==
NGC 2415 is the namesake of the NGC 2415 group (also known as LGG 148) which has at least 9 members. The other eight galaxies are NGC 2444, NGC 2445, NGC 2476, NGC 2493, NGC 2524, NGC 2528, UGC 3937, and UGC 3944.

== Supernovae ==
Two supernovae have been observed in NGC 2415:

- SN 1998Y (Type II, mag. 18.3) was discovered by the Lick Observatory Supernova Search (LOSS) 16 March 1998.
- SN 2000C (Type Ic, mag. 15.5) was discovered by Steven Foulkes, and independently by Marco Migliardi, on 8 January 2000.

== See also ==
- List of NGC objects (2001–3000)
