= Abell 646 BCG =

Brightest cluster galaxy in the constellation Lynx

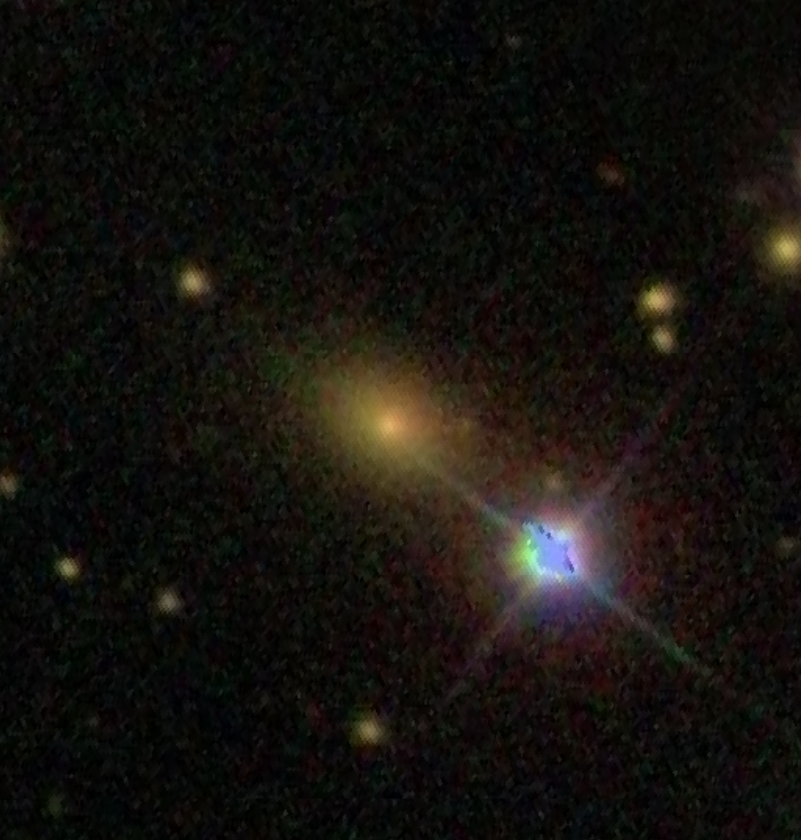
- SDSS image of Abell 646 BCG

Observation data (J2000.0 epoch)
- Constellation: Lynx
- Right ascension: 08^{h} 22^{m} 09.54^{s}
- Declination: +47° 05′ 52.79″
- Redshift: 0.127081
- Heliocentric radial velocity: 38,098 ± 4 km/s
- Distance: 1,833.7 ± 128.4 Mly (562.23 ± 39.36 Mpc)
- Group or cluster: Abell 646
- magnitude (J): 14.10
- magnitude (H): 13.51

Characteristics
- Type: BrClG Sy1.5
- Size: ~454,000 ly (139.3 kpc) (estimated)

Other designations
- 2MASX J08220955+4705529, Abell 0646:[REK2022] BCG, ABELL 0646:KYDISC 00007, LEDA 2292300, IVS B0818+47A, NVSS J082209+470552, MaxBCG J125.53981+47.09802 BCG, SDSS J082209.54+470553.1

Abell 646 BCG (short for Abell 646 Brightest Cluster Galaxy) is an elliptical galaxy residing as the brightest cluster galaxy (BCG) of the X-ray galaxy cluster, Abell 646 in the constellation of Lynx. The redshift of the galaxy is (z) 0.127 and it was first discovered by astronomers in July 1999, who found the optical spectrum of the galaxy has presence of emission lines. This galaxy also contains an active galactic nucleus (AGN).

== Description ==
Abell 646 BCG is classified as a Seyfert galaxy. The total hydrogen-alpha luminosity is estimated to be 0.33 × 10^{42} erg s^{−1} and the hydrogen-alpha broad component has a full width at half maximum (FWHM) measurement of 1,889.2 kilometers per second. The central supermassive black hole mass is estimated to be 6.83 M_{☉} or 1.87 × 10^{9} M_{☉} based on a study of dynamical masses for BCGs published in June 2020. It is also a radio galaxy containing a compact radio source with a radio power of 24.37 W Hz^{−1} at 1.4 GHz frequencies.

The total infrared luminosity of the BCG is estimated to be 1.49 × 10^{44} erg s^{−1} and it displays signs of infrared radio emission with flux densities of 1.78 and 1.27 mJy based on detections by the Spitzer Space Telescope at 3.6 and 4.5 micrometer respectively. The BCG also shows an intermediate stellar population of blue stars, with the inner populations being aged 3,680 ± 510 million years and the outer populations being 5,780 ± 2,150 million years. A study published in 2018 found the BCG has kinematic properties. The central velocity dispersion is 313 ± 5 kilometers per second and the rotation is estimated to be 028 ± 0.09 V_{max}.

There is also evidence that the BCG contains carbon oxide (CO) line emission having lines that have widths of 221 ± 97 kilometers per second and velocity shifts of 125 ± 97 kilometers per second. The molecular gas mass is estimated to be less than 1.3 × 10^{10} M_{☉}, while the total dust mass is also less than 1.3 × 10^{7} M_{☉}. The molecular line luminosity is calculated at 1.6 ± 0.6 × 10^{40} erg s^{−1}. The BCG has cold molecular gas with an estimated hydrogen mass (H_{2}) of 7.9 ± 0.2 x 10^{9} M_{☉}.
