= UX Lyncis =

Star in the constellation Lynx

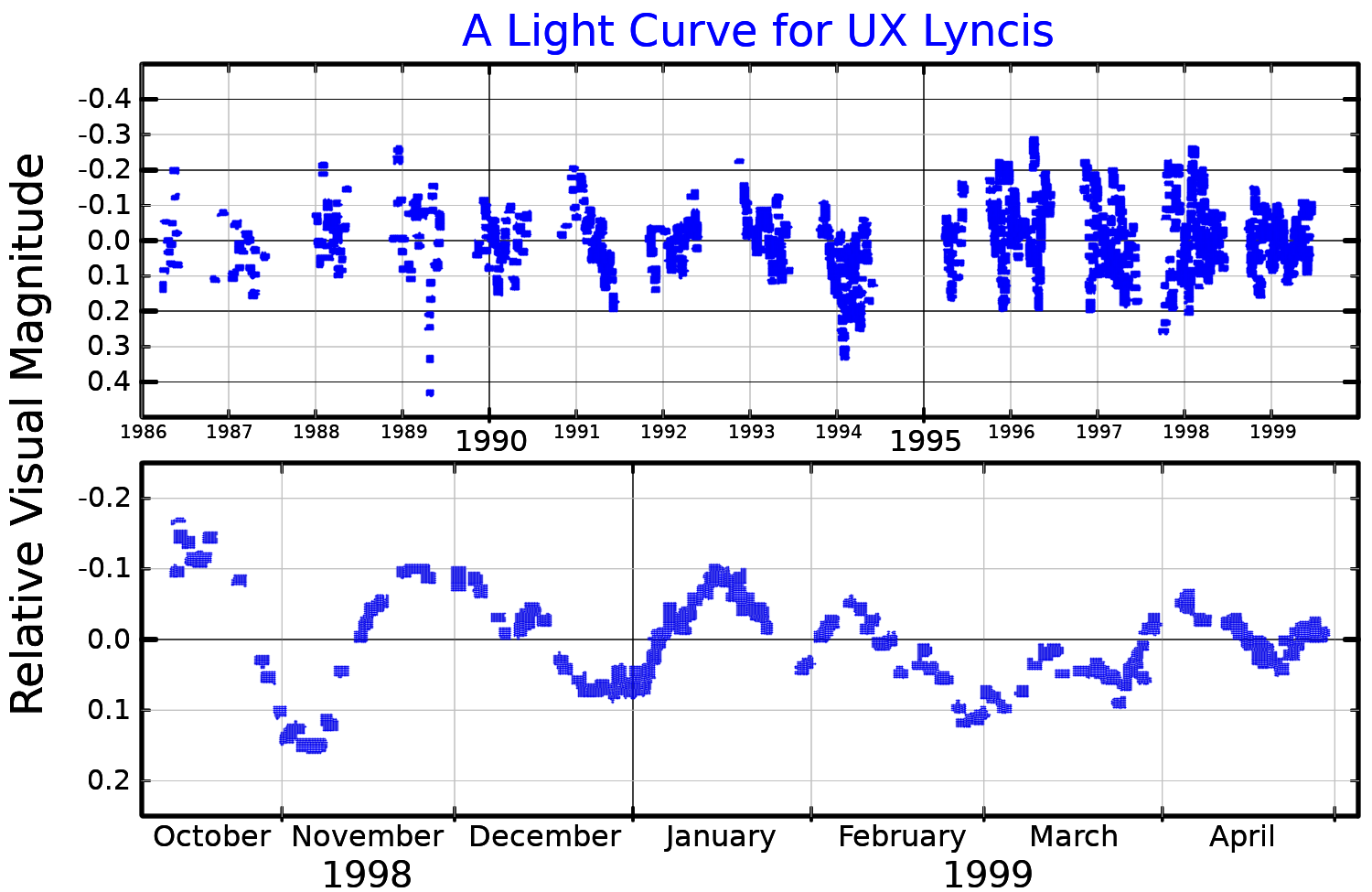
- A visual band light curve for UX Lyncis. The top panel shows the variation over a period of years, and the lower plot shows the variation over a period of months. Adapted from Percy and Wilson (2001)

Observation data Epoch J2000 Equinox J2000
- Constellation: Lynx
- Right ascension: 09^{h} 03^{m} 47.10789^{s}
- Declination: +38° 44′ 31.6542″
- Apparent magnitude (V): 6.6 - 6.78

Characteristics
- Evolutionary stage: AGB
- Spectral type: M3III or M6III
- B−V color index: 1.356±0.011
- Variable type: SRb:

Astrometry
Radial velocity (R_{v})	+38.60±0.64 km/s
Proper motion (μ)	RA: −17.176 mas/yr Dec.: −20.823 mas/yr
Parallax (π)	3.6035±0.4422 mas
Distance	approx. 900 ly (approx. 280 pc)
Absolute bolometric magnitude (M_{bol})	−0.15

Details
Radius	128.38+0.92 −9.89 R_{☉}
Luminosity	1,766±242 L_{☉}
Temperature	3302+135 −11 K

Other designations
- UX Lyn, BD+39°2193, HD 77443, HIP 44481, SAO 61226, IRAS 09005+3856

Database references
SIMBAD	data

UX Lyncis is a variable star in the faint northern constellation of Lynx, positioned about 3° to the south of the 4th magnitude star 10 Ursae Majoris. This is a red-hued star near the lower threshold of visibility to the naked eye, having an apparent visual magnitude that fluctuates around 6.70. It is located at a distance of approximately 900 light years from the Sun based on parallax, and is drifting further away with a radial velocity of +39 km/s.

The stellar classification of this star is M3III, while the infrared spectrum matches a class of M6III. It is an aging red giant on the asymptotic giant branch that has exhausted the supply of both hydrogen and helium in its core, then cooled and expanded. At present it has 128 times the radius of the Sun, which is equivalent to 0.60 AU or 60% of the distance from the Sun to the Earth. On average, it radiates a luminosity approximately 1,766 times that of the Sun from its swollen photosphere at an effective temperature of 3,302 K. Infrared observations show little or no evidence for an oxygen-rich dusty shell around the star.

The variability of this star was reported by R. L. Walker in 1970 from the U.S. Naval Observatory. It was given its variable star designation in 1973. UX Lyncis has been classified as a semiregular variable ranging from magnitude 6.6 down to 6.78. Its changes in brightness are complex, with a shorter period of 37.3 days due to the star's pulsations, and a longer period of 420 days possibly due to the star's rotation or convectively induced oscillatory thermal (COT) mode. There is some evidence for an additional weak variability with a 29 day period.
