= 12 Lyncis =

Star in the constellation Lynx

- Location of 12 Lyncis (circled in red)

Observation data Epoch J2000 Equinox ICRS
- Constellation: Lynx
- Right ascension: 06^{h} 46^{m} 14.13019^{s}
- Declination: +59° 26′ 30.0227″
- Apparent magnitude (V): 4.86 (5.44 / 6.00)

Characteristics
- Spectral type: A3V (A1.5V + A2V)
- U−B color index: +0.08
- B−V color index: +0.084±0.012

Astrometry
Radial velocity (R_{v})	−3.0±4.2 km/s
Proper motion (μ)	RA: −19.63 mas/yr Dec.: −7.23 mas/yr
Parallax (π)	15.19±0.78 mas
Distance	210 ± 10 ly (66 ± 3 pc)
Absolute magnitude (M_{V})	0.77

Orbit
Period (P)	907.6 yr
Semi-major axis (a)	2.30″
Eccentricity (e)	0.3700
Inclination (i)	134.7°
Longitude of the node (Ω)	166.5°
Periastron epoch (T)	B 2677.4
Argument of periastron (ω) (secondary)	322.6°

Details

12 Lyn A
Radius	2.52 R_{☉}
Rotational velocity (v sin i)	90±30 km/s

12 Lyn B
Radius	2.44 R_{☉}
Rotational velocity (v sin i)	100±30 km/s

Other designations
- 12 Lyn, BD+59°1015, GC 9850, HD 48250, HIP 32438, HR 2470, SAO 25939, WDS 06462+5927

Database references
SIMBAD	12 Lyn
- 12 Lyn A
- 12 Lyn B

12 Lyncis, abbreviated 12 Lyn, is a triple star system in the constellation Lynx. It is visible to the naked eye as a faint point of light with a combined apparent visual magnitude of 4.87. When seen through a telescope, it can be separated into three stars: two components with magnitudes 5.4 and 6.0 that lie at an angular separation by 1.8″ (as of 1992) and a yellow-hued star of magnitude 7.2 at a separation of 8.6″ (as of 1990). The orbit of the two brighter stars is not known with certainty, but appears to have a period of somewhere around 700 to 900 years. The pair have a projected separation of 128 AU. Parallax indicates the system is 210±10 light years distant from Earth.
