= NGC 2830 =

Lenticular galaxy in constellation Lynx

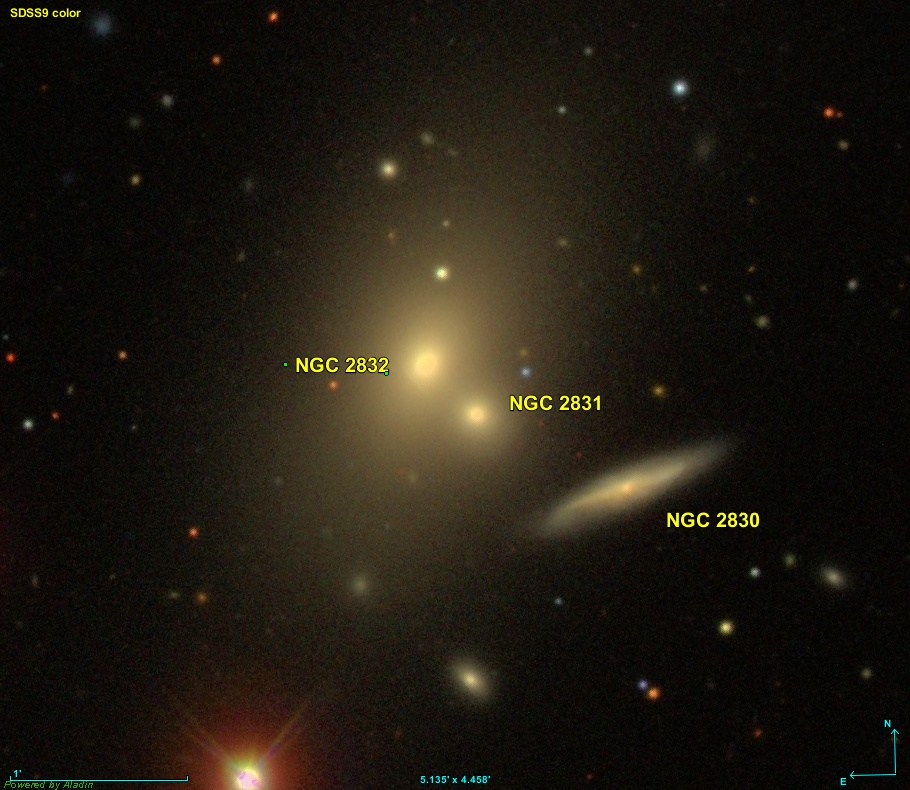

Observation data (J2000 epoch)
- Constellation: Lynx (constellation)
- Right ascension: 09^{h} 19^{m} 41.3932^{s}
- Declination: +33° 44′ 16.962″
- Redshift: 0.02033±0.00001
- Distance: 317 Mly (97.27 Mpc)
- Apparent magnitude (V): 13.9

Characteristics
- Type: SB0-a
- Notable features: Seyfert galaxy

Other designations
- UGC 04941 CGCG 181-023 CGCG 0916.7+3357 MCG +06-21-014

NGC 2830 is a lenticular galaxy in the constellation Lynx. It was discovered on March 13, 1850, by George Stoney. NGC 2830 is located about 317 million light-years away from earth.

== Supernova ==
SN 2024vsu (Type II, mag. 17.5) was observed in NGC 2830. It was discovered by Kōichi Itagaki on 19 September 2024.

== See Also ==
List of NGC objects (2001-3000)

Seyfert Galaxy
