= NGC 2444 =

Galaxy in the constellation Lynx

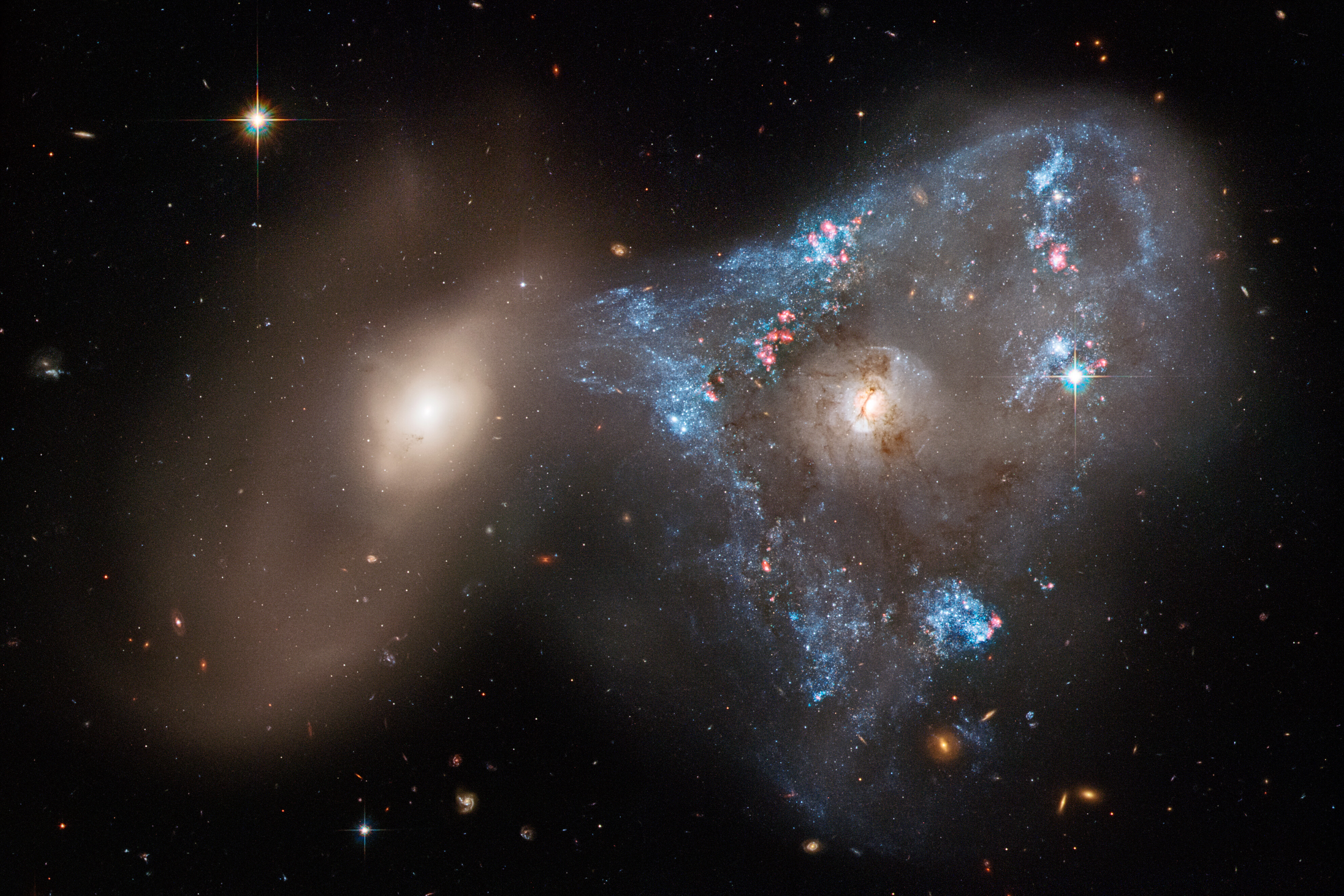
- NGC 2444 (left) and NGC 2445 by Hubble Space Telescope

Observation data (J2000 epoch)
- Constellation: Lynx
- Right ascension: 07^{h} 46^{m} 53.0^{s}
- Declination: 39° 01′ 55″
- Redshift: 4048 ± 17 km/s
- Distance: 135 ± 35 Mly (45.4 ± 10.9 Mpc)
- Apparent magnitude (V): 12.9

Characteristics
- Type: S0 pec
- Apparent size (V): 1.2′ × 0.8′
- Notable features: interacting galaxy

Other designations
- UGC 4016, Arp 143, VV 117a, MCG +07-16-016, PGC 21774

NGC 2444 is a peculiar lenticular galaxy in the constellation Lynx. The galaxy lies about 135 million light years away from Earth, which means, given its apparent dimensions, that NGC 2444 is approximately 50,000 light years across. It was discovered by Édouard Stephan on January 18, 1877. The galaxy interacts with another galaxy, NGC 2445, whose shape is distorted and has large star formation regions.

NGC 2444 has collided with another galaxy, NGC 2445. As a result of the collision, a bridge of young blue stars has formed between the two galaxies, and while the galaxy itself has been stretched, NGC 2444 contains old stars and no new starbirth because it lost its gas long ago, well before this galactic encounter.

One supernova has been observed in NGC 2444/5, SN 2016bam. The supernova occurred between the two galaxies, about 3.5 arcseconds away from a HII region of NGC 2445. It was a Type II supernova which had magnitude 16.1 at discovery.

NGC 2445 and NGC 2444 (which lies about one arcminute away) form a pair, known as Arp 143. The pair is part of a galaxy group known as LGG 148. Other members of the group include the galaxies NGC 2476, NGC 2493, NGC 2524, NGC 2415, UGC 3937, and UGC 3944.
