= Lynx Arc =

Hottest known starbirthing region in the universe

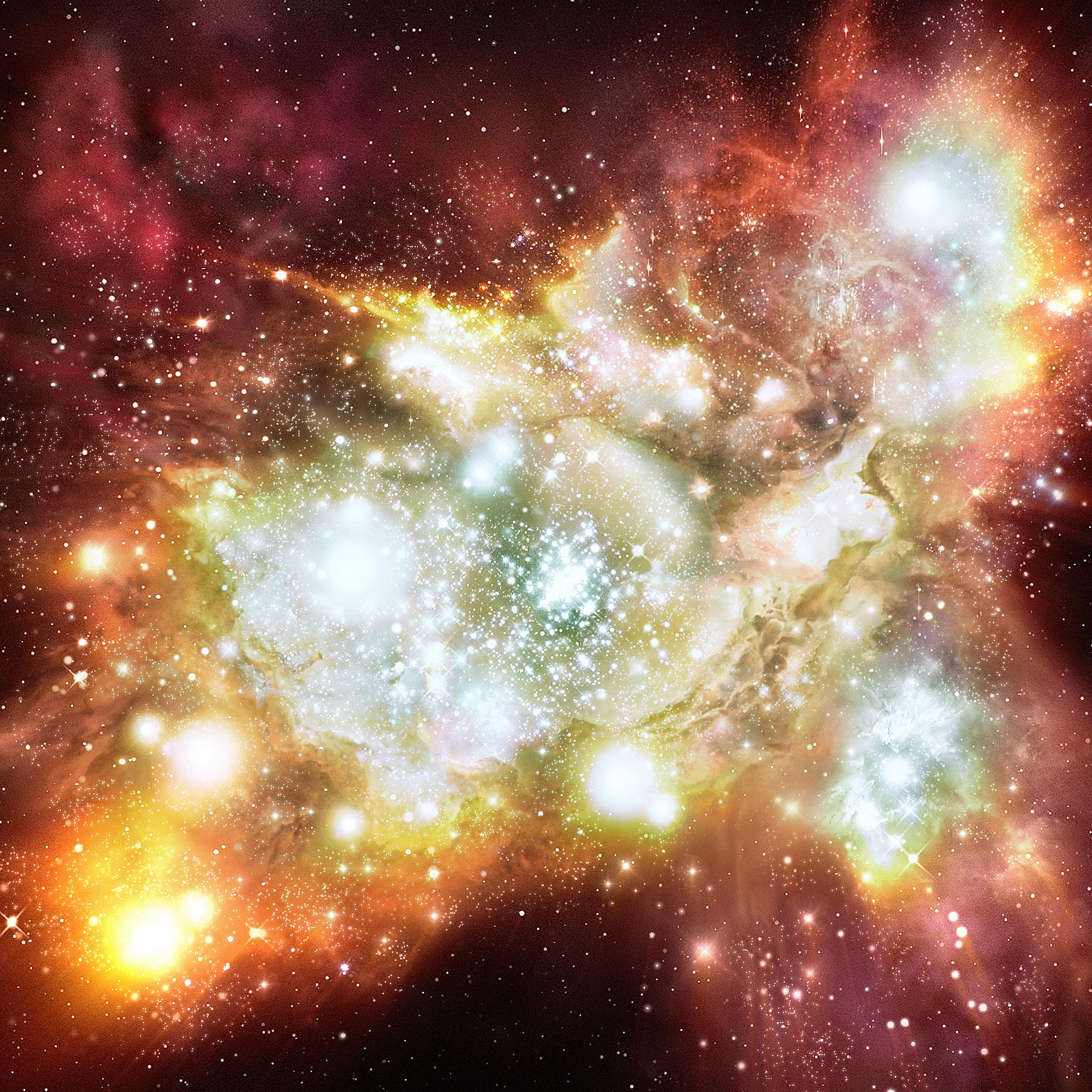
- artist impression of the Lynx Arc

Observation data (J2000 epoch)
- Right ascension: 08^{h} 48^{m} 48.76^{s}
- Declination: +44° 55′ 49.6″
- Distance: 12 billion ly

Physical characteristics
- Hottest known star-birthing region.

Associations
- Constellation: Lynx

The Lynx Arc was discovered in 2003 and is considered to be the hottest known star-birthing region in the universe as of 2003. It is located at 08^{h} 48^{m} 48.76^{s} +44° 55′ 49.6″.

It is located in the constellation Lynx, 12 billion light years away (z=3.357) from Earth, 8 million times farther away and one million times brighter than the Orion Nebula. It is estimated to contain around one million O-type stars.

The Lynx Arc was found in a systematic search around galaxy cluster RX J0848+4456 (z=0.570), with the help of a gravitational lens, a 4.5 billion light years distant galaxy cluster (CL J0848.8+4455 lying at z=0.543). Amongst others the Keck Observatory, the Hubble Space Telescope and ROSAT participated in the search.

Located behind a cluster of galaxies in northern Constellation Lynx around 12 billion light-years (ly) away, the Lynx Arc is a distant supercluster of extremely hot, young stars. Roughly one million times brighter than the well-known Orion Nebula, the Lynx Arc contains a million blue stars that are twice as hot as similar stars in the Milky Way galaxy. Only visible through gravitational lensing by a closer cluster of galaxies, the Arc is a feature of the early days of the universe, when "furious firestorms of star birth" were more common. It may be going through a short-lived luminous phase that may have lasted for as little as a few million years (Fosbury et al., 2003, in pdf).

The surface temperature of the stars in the Lynx Arc is estimated to be around 80000 K, about twenty times as hot as stars in our neighborhood. Only the stars formed directly after the Big Bang (Population III stars) are considered to be hotter (around 120000 K). The universe was only 2 billion years old at the time at which we are observing the Lynx Arc. The first stars were born 1.8 billion years before the Lynx Arc.
