= Y Lyncis =

Variable star in the constellation Lynx

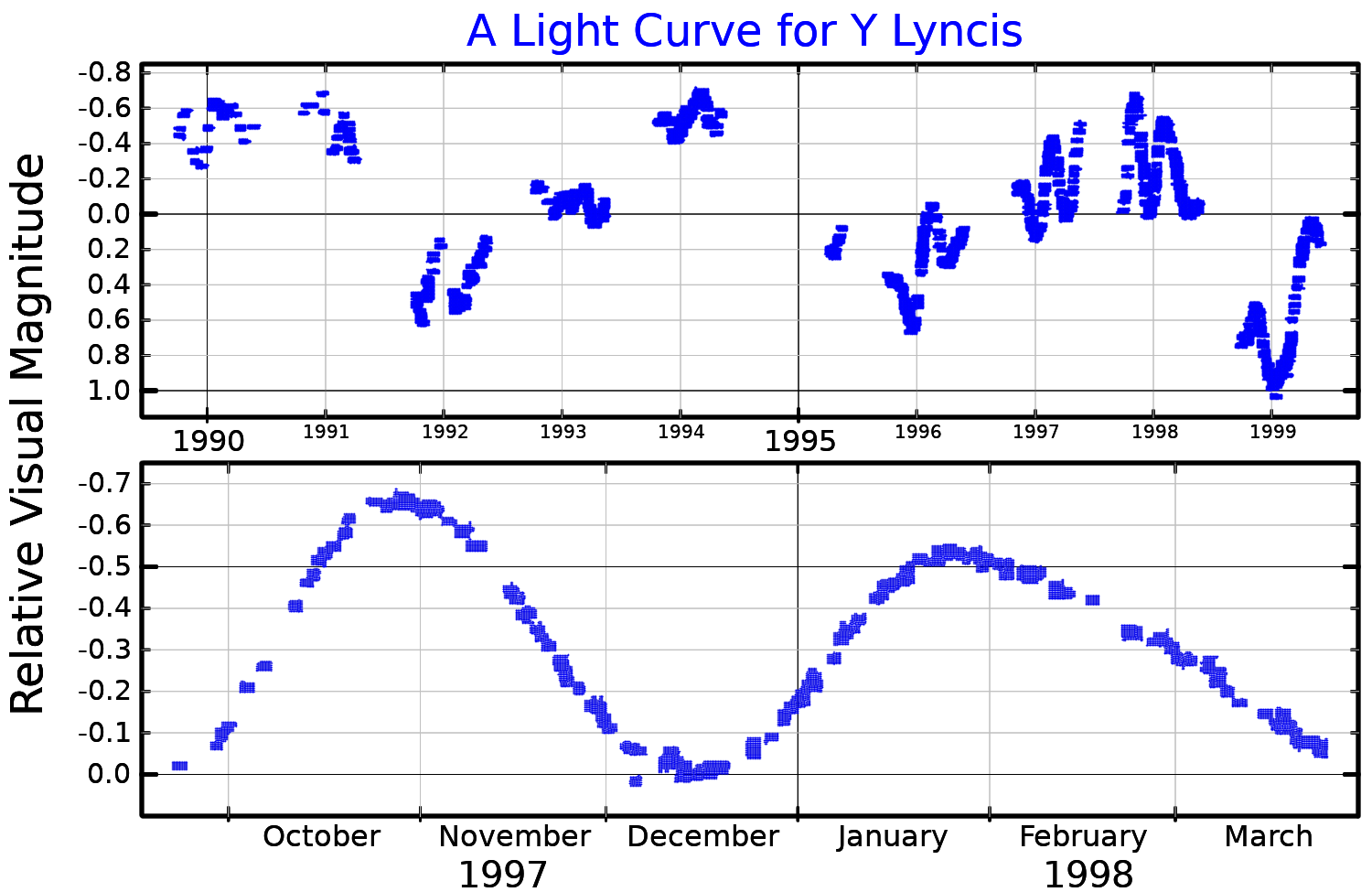
- A visual band light curve for Y Lyncis, adapted from Percy et al. (2001). The top panel shows the brightness variation over a period of several years, and the lower panel shows shorter time scale variations.

Observation data Epoch J2000 Equinox ICRS
- Constellation: Lynx
- Right ascension: 07^{h} 28^{m} 11.61657^{s}
- Declination: +45° 59′ 26.2295″
- Apparent magnitude (V): 6.2 - 8.9

Characteristics
- Evolutionary stage: AGB
- Spectral type: M6S Ib
- Variable type: SRc

Astrometry
Radial velocity (R_{v})	5.50±0.6 km/s
Proper motion (μ)	RA: −1.278 mas/yr Dec.: −4.067 mas/yr
Parallax (π)	2.8068±0.1138 mas
Distance	1,160 ± 50 ly (360 ± 10 pc)

Details
Mass	1.5 - 2.0 M_{☉}
Radius	580 R_{☉}
Luminosity	10,765 L_{☉}
Surface gravity (log g)	0.0 cgs
Temperature	3,200 K
Metallicity [Fe/H]	−0.19 dex

Other designations
- Y Lyn, HD 58521, BD+46°1271, HIP 36288, SAO 41784

Database references
SIMBAD	data

Y Lyncis is a semiregular variable star in the constellation Lynx. It is an asymptotic giant branch star of spectral type M6S, with a luminosity class of Ib, indicating a supergiant luminosity. It is around 1,160 light years away. Y Lyncis ranges in brightness from magnitude 6.2 to 8.9. When it is at its brightest, it very faintly visible to the naked eye under excellent observing conditions.

In 1901 it was announced that Williamina Fleming had discovered that the star, then known as BD +46°1271, is a variable star. It was given its variable star designation, Y Lyncis, in 1912. The changes in brightness of this star are complex, with at least two different periods showing. The General Catalogue of Variable Stars lists a period of 110 days. More recent studies show a primary pulsation period of 133 days, with and a long secondary period with an amplitude of 0.2 magnitudes and duration 1,300 days. The long secondary period variations are possibly caused by long-lived convection cells.

Y Lyncis has a mass around 1.5-2.0 M_{☉} and a luminosity around 10,000 L_{☉}. It is a thermally pulsing asymptotic giant branch star, an evolved star with a carbon-oxygen core that is fusing helium in a shell and hydrogen in a separate shell. It is also an S-type star, where third dredge-ups have brought some carbon to the surface, but not enough to create a carbon star.
