= Alpha Lyncis =

Star in the constellation Lynx

α Lyncis
- Location of α Lyncis (circled)

Observation data Epoch J2000 Equinox ICRS
- Constellation: Lynx
- Right ascension: 09^{h} 21^{m} 03.30021^{s}
- Declination: +34° 23′ 33.2134″
- Apparent magnitude (V): +3.14

Characteristics
- Evolutionary stage: Giant star
- Spectral type: K7 III
- U−B color index: +1.95
- B−V color index: +1.55

Astrometry
Radial velocity (R_{v})	37.15 km/s
Proper motion (μ)	RA: −218.723 mas/yr Dec.: 16.555 mas/yr
Parallax (π)	14.7±0.18 mas
Distance	220.7+2.9 −2.6 ly (67.7+0.9 −0.8 pc)
Absolute bolometric magnitude (M_{bol})	–2.32 ± 0.13

Details
Mass	1.52±0.077 M_{☉}
Radius	58.15+0.73 −0.75 R_{☉}
Luminosity	621.1±15.8 L_{☉}
Surface gravity (log g)	1.06±0.04 cgs
Temperature	3,881±20 K
Metallicity [Fe/H]	−0.26±0.05 dex
Rotational velocity (v sin i)	6.4 km/s
Age	1.4 Gyr

Other designations
- 40 Lyncis, HR 3705, HD 80493, BD+35°1979, HIP 45860, SAO 61414, FK5 352, NSV 4456, GC 12880

Database references
SIMBAD	data

Alpha Lyncis (α Lyn, α Lyncis) is the brightest star in the northern constellation of Lynx with an apparent magnitude of +3.13. Unusually, it is the only star in the constellation that has a Bayer designation. Based upon parallax measurements, this star is located about 220 light-years (67 parsecs) from the Earth.

== Characteristics ==
This is a red giant star that has exhausted the hydrogen at its core and has evolved away from the main sequence. It has expanded to about 58 times the Sun's radius and it is emitting roughly 621 times the luminosity of the Sun. The estimated effective temperature of the star's outer envelope is 3,881 K, which is lower than the Sun's effective temperature of 5,778 K, and is giving Alpha Lyncis a red-orange hue that is characteristic of late K-type stars.

Alpha Lyncis is a suspected small-amplitude red variable star that changes apparent magnitude from +3.17 up to +3.12. This variability pattern typically occurs in stars that have developed an inert carbon core surrounded by a helium-fusing shell, and suggests that Alpha Lyncis is starting to evolve into a Mira variable.
