= NGC 2419 =

Globular cluster in the constellation Lynx

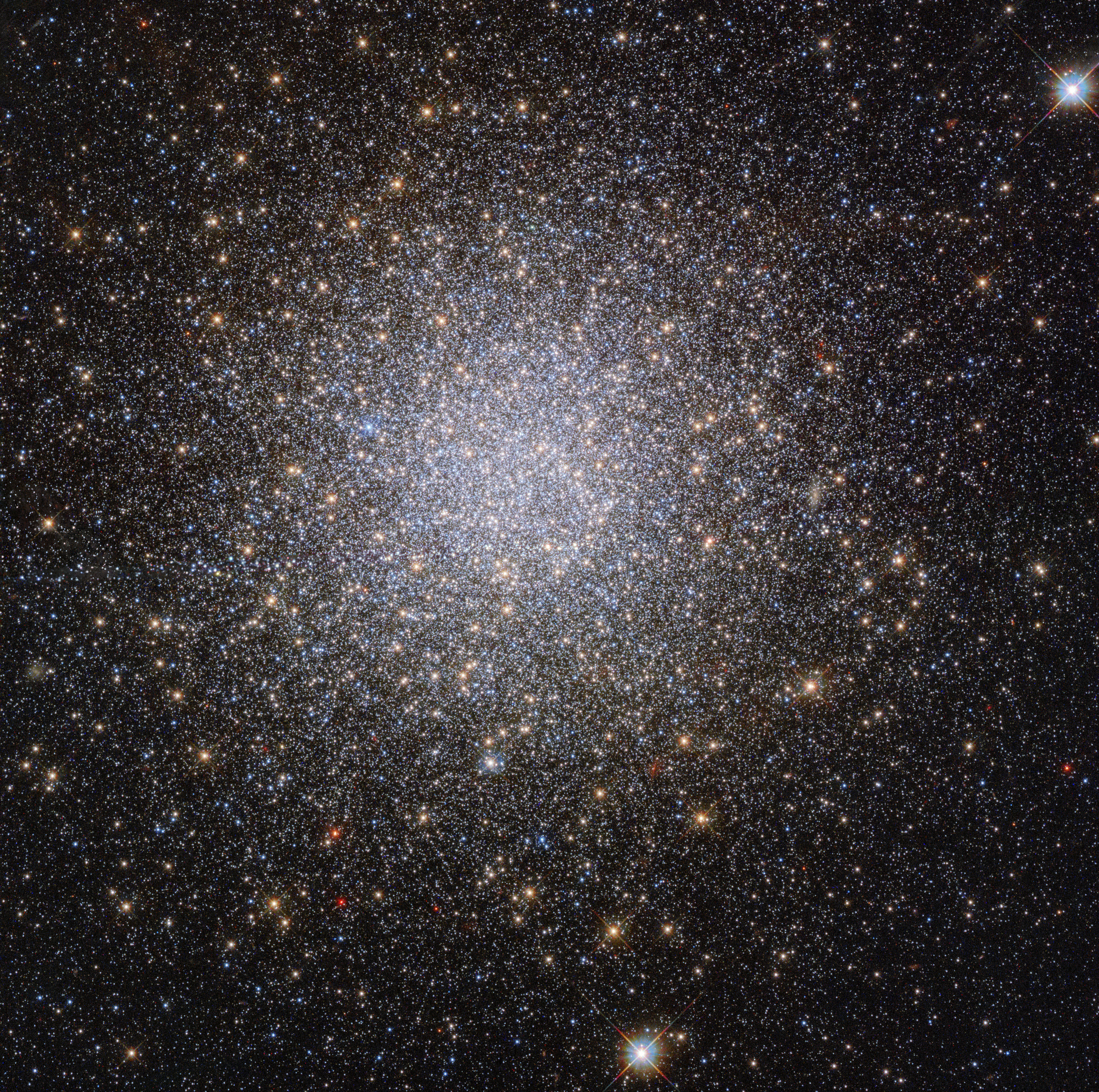
- NGC 2419 by HST

Observation data (J2000 epoch)
- Class: VII
- Constellation: Lynx
- Right ascension: 07^{h} 38^{m} 08.51^{s}
- Declination: +38° 52′ 54.9″
- Distance: 275 kly (from the Sun); 300 kly (from the GC) (84.2 kpc (Sun); 91.5 kpc (GC))
- Apparent magnitude (V): 10.3
- Apparent dimensions (V): 4.6′

Physical characteristics
- Mass: 9×10^{5} M_{☉}
- Radius: 260 ly
- V_{HB}: 20.45
- Metallicity: [Fe/H] = –2.14 dex
- Estimated age: 12.3 Gyr
- Other designations: GCl 112, Caldwell 25

NGC 2419 is a globular cluster of stars in the constellation Lynx. Alternatively, it is known as Caldwell 25. It was discovered by German-British astronomer William Herschel on December 31, 1788. NGC 2419 is at a distance of about 300,000 light years from the Solar System and at the same distance from the Galactic Center.

NGC 2419 bears the nickname "the Intergalactic Wanderer," which was bestowed when it was erroneously thought not to be in orbit around the Milky Way. Its orbit takes it farther away from the galactic center than the Magellanic Clouds, but it can (with qualifications) be considered as part of the Milky Way. At this great distance it takes three billion years to make one trip around the galaxy.

The cluster is dim in comparison to more famous globular clusters such as M13. Nonetheless, NGC 2419 is a 9th magnitude object and is readily viewed in good sky conditions with telescopes as small as 102mm (four inches) in aperture. Intrinsically, it is one of the brightest and most massive globular clusters of our galaxy, having an absolute magnitude of −9.42 and being 900,000 times more massive than the Sun.

It was proposed that NGC 2419 could be, as Omega Centauri, the remnant of a dwarf spheroidal galaxy disrupted and accreted by the Milky Way. However, that hypothesis has been disputed.

Astronomer Leos Ondra has noted that NGC 2419 would be the "best and brightest" for any observers in the Andromeda Galaxy, looking for globular clusters in our galaxy since it lies outside the obscuring density of the main disk. This is analogous to the way the cluster G1 can be seen orbiting outside of the Andromeda Galaxy from Earth.

It was found to be composed of two different populations, one being more helium-rich than the other, which does not fit the current model for globular cluster formation (which leads to a very homogeneous population in the cluster). This raises new questions on how this globular cluster was formed.

The cluster has been studied for a possible presence of a central black hole, which would explain the high mass-to-light (M/L) ratio. However, this could also be caused by a high concentration of stellar-mass black holes, a centrally segregated mass of faint stars, or dark matter, as a central black hole is not required for this explanation.

== Gallery ==
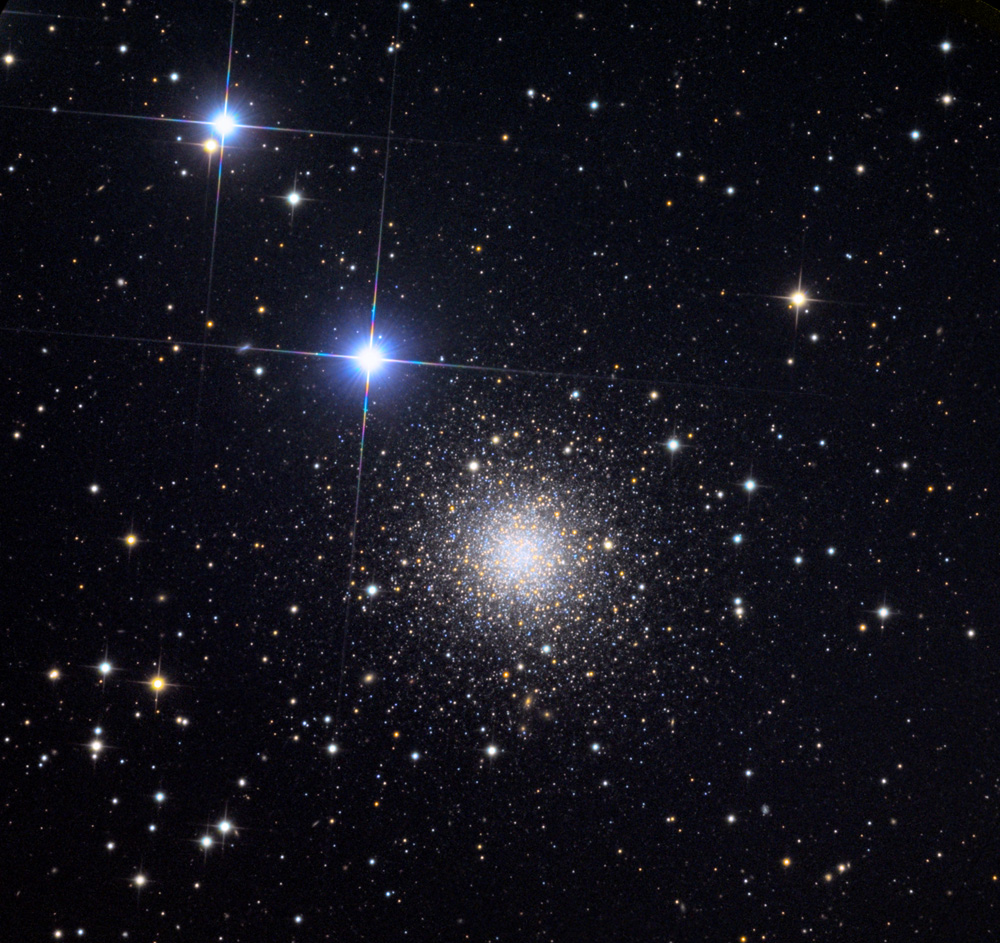
NGC 2419 – wide field view

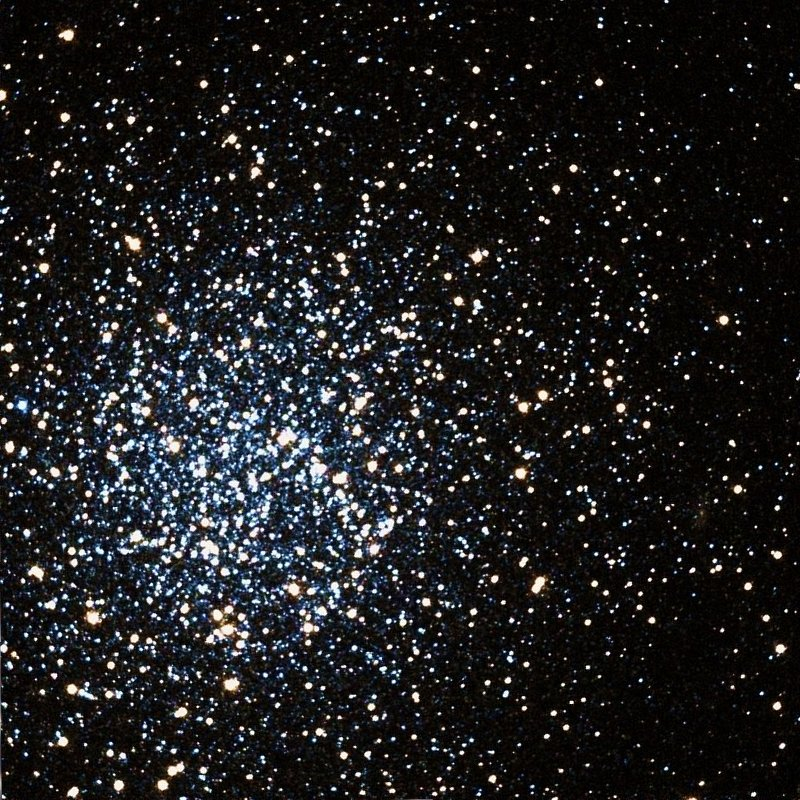
Center of NGC 2419 (Hubble Space Telescope)
