= NGC 2445 =

Galaxy in the constellation Lynx

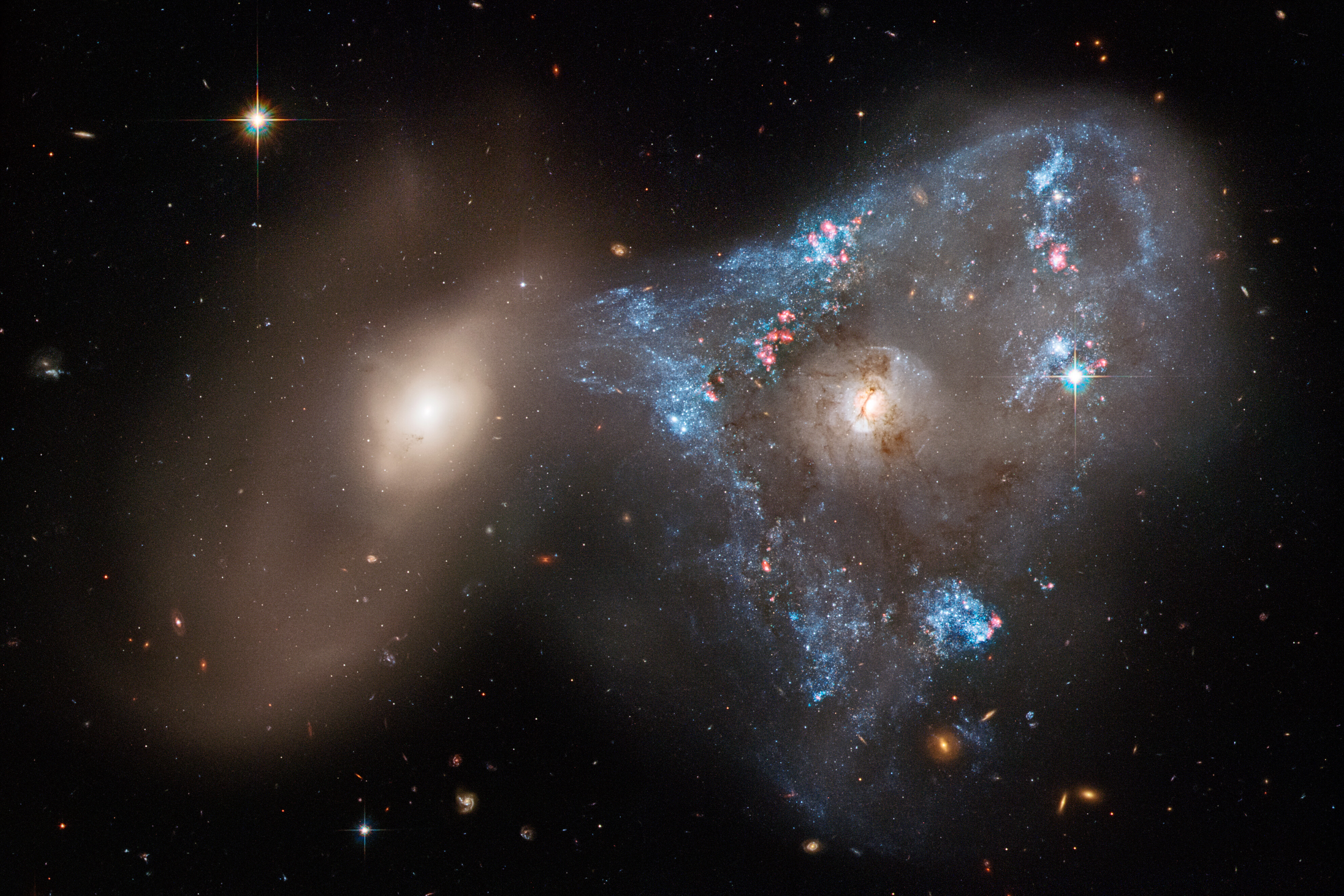
- NGC 2444 (left) and NGC 2445 by Hubble Space Telescope

Observation data (J2000 epoch)
- Constellation: Lynx
- Right ascension: 07^{h} 46^{m} 55.1^{s}
- Declination: 39° 00′ 55″
- Redshift: 4002 ± 8 km/s
- Distance: 203 ± 21 Mly (62.3 ± 6.7 Mpc)
- Apparent magnitude (V): 13.0

Characteristics
- Type: Im pec (Ring B)
- Apparent size (V): 1.4′ × 1.1′
- Notable features: interacting galaxy, collisional ring

Other designations
- UGC 4017, Arp 143, VV 117, MCG +07-16-017, PGC 21776

NGC 2445 is a peculiar ring galaxy in the constellation Lynx. The galaxy lies about 200 million light years away from Earth, which means, given its apparent dimensions, that NGC 2445 is approximately 100,000 light years across. It was discovered by Édouard Stephan on January 18, 1877. The galaxy interacts with another galaxy, NGC 2444, and as a result its shape is distorted and new stars are formed.

== Characteristics ==
NGC 2445 is characterised by its distorted shape and star formation which is the result of the collision with another galaxy, NGC 2444. NGC 2444 has pulled gas away from NGC 2445 and as a result a bridge of young blue stars has formed between the two galaxies that gives the latter a triangular shape. The interaction has also created a ring of star clusters and HII regions around the nucleus. The kinematics of the gas indicate that the ring has an age of 60 ± 15 million years.

When observed in radio waves the galaxy is asymmetric, with emission being from the nucleus, three star-forming regions and a ridge towards NGC 2444. The northwestern region appears to have stronger magnetic field than the other two. Two giant molecular clouds are visible in the ^{12}CO(J=1–0) emission to the west and northwest of the nucleus. In mid infrared are visible some arms connecting the ring with the nucleus.

The streamers between the two galaxies are among the first in what appears to be a wave of star formation that started on the galaxy's outskirts and continued inward. Researchers estimate the streamer stars were born between 50 million and 100 million years ago. The age of the star-forming knots in the ring is calculated to be 2–8 million years. Stars no older than one million to two million years old are forming closer to the centre of NGC 2445. Observations of carbon monoxide emission indicate that NGC 2445 still has abundant gas and star formation rates will increase.

Hubble Space Telescope has uncovered dark filaments of gas in the starburst galaxy's bright core. Those features may have been formed by outbursts of material, however the dust from the outbursts blankets the nucleus in the visible spectrum. When observed in radio waves the core isn't very compact and its spectrum indicates the presence of a starburst region with an age between 1.5 and 5 million years.

A shell of hydrogen gas measuring 20 kiloparsecs across has been found at a projected distance of about 100 kiloparsec of the galactic system. A filament of this shells points towards the galaxies indicating that it is a superbubble associated with them or a tidal tail.

== Supernova ==
One supernova has been observed in NGC 2444/5, SN 2016bam. The supernova occurred between the two galaxies, about 3.5 arcseconds away from a HII region of NGC 2445. It was a Type II supernova which had magnitude 16.1 at discovery.

== Nearby galaxies ==
NGC 2445 and NGC 2444 (which lies about one arcminute away) form a pair, known as Arp 143. The pair is part of a galaxy group known as LGG 148. Other members of the group include the galaxies NGC 2476, NGC 2493, NGC 2524, NGC 2415, UGC 3937, and UGC 3944.
