= WASP-13 =

Star in the constellation Lynx

WASP-13 / Gloas
Observation data Epoch J2000 Equinox ICRS
- Constellation: Lynx
- Right ascension: 09^{h} 20^{m} 24.7145^{s}
- Declination: +33° 52′ 56.696″
- Apparent magnitude (V): 10.42

Characteristics
- Evolutionary stage: borderline main sequence\subgiant
- Spectral type: G1 V

Astrometry
Radial velocity (R_{v})	10.00±0.20 km/s
Proper motion (μ)	RA: −2.275 mas/yr Dec.: −20.072 mas/yr
Parallax (π)	4.3310±0.0195 mas
Distance	753 ± 3 ly (231 ± 1 pc)

Details
Mass	1.22±0.12 M_{☉}
Radius	1.657±0.079 R_{☉}
Luminosity	2.895 L_{☉}
Surface gravity (log g)	4.04±0.2 cgs
Temperature	5,830±100 K
Metallicity [Fe/H]	0.0±0.2 dex
Rotational velocity (v sin i)	< 4.9 km/s
Age	5.1±2.0 Gyr

Other designations
- Gloas, BD+34 1976, TOI-1767, TIC 8767448, WASP-13, TYC 2496-1114-1, 2MASS J09202471+3352567, 1SWASP J092024.70+335256.6

Database references
SIMBAD	data
Exoplanet Archive	data

WASP-13, also named Gloas, is a star in the constellation Lynx. The star is similar, in terms of metallicity and mass, to the Sun, although it is hotter and most likely older. The star was first observed in 1997, according to the SIMBAD database, and was targeted by SuperWASP after the star was observed by one of the SuperWASP telescopes beginning in 2006. Follow-up observations on the star led to the discovery of planet Cruinlagh in 2008; the discovery paper was published in 2009.

== Observational history ==
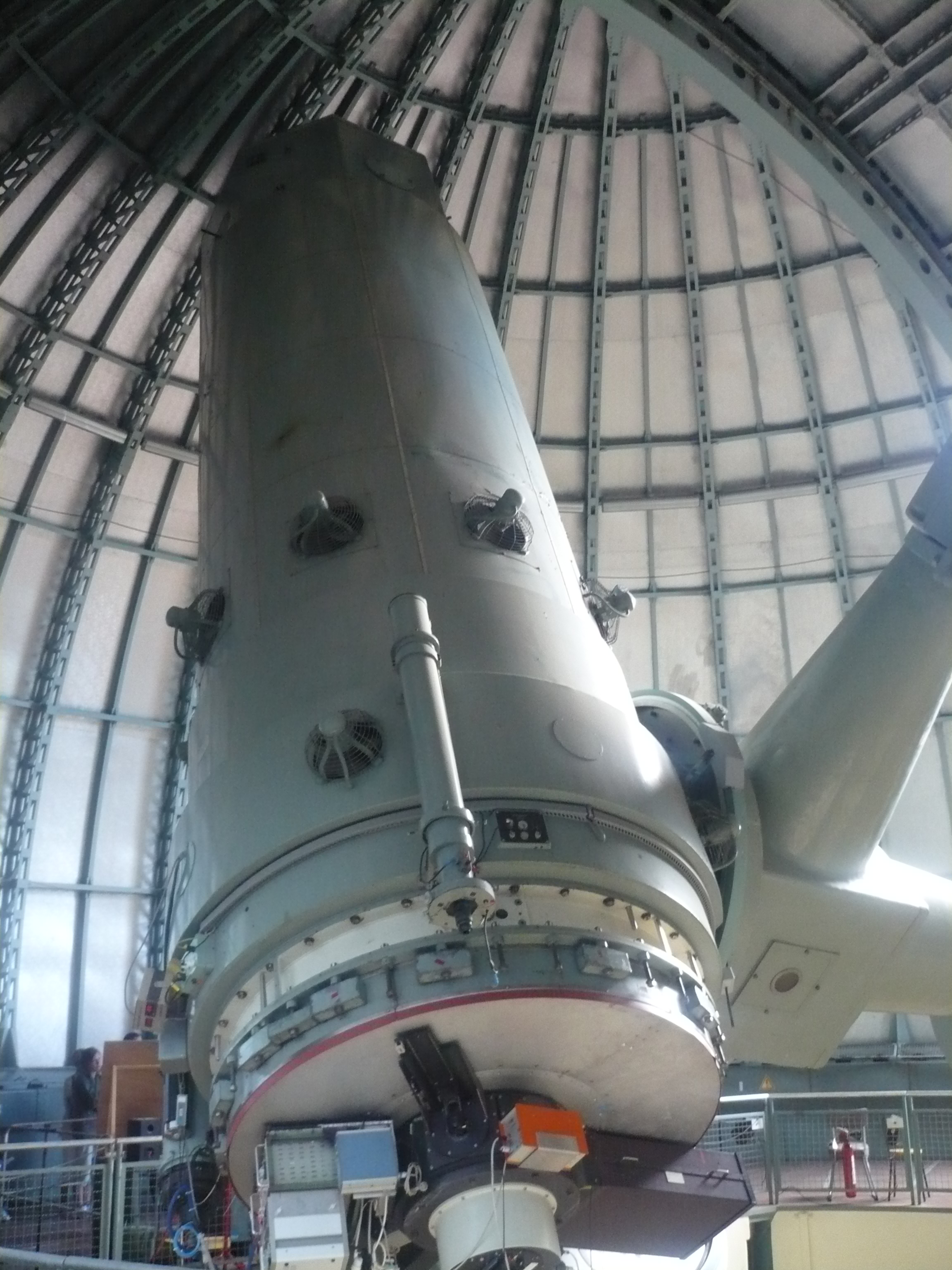
The telescope, housed at the Haute-Provence Observatory, which was used to collect radial velocity measurements

According to SIMBAD, WASP-13 was first observed in 1997, when it was catalogued by astronomers measuring the proper motion of stars in regions of the sky where galaxies are detected. Between November 27, 2006, and April 1, 2007, the SuperWASP-North telescope in the Canary Islands observed WASP-13; analysis of the data suggested that a planet could be in the orbit of the star.

Follow-up observations were conducted by a team of British, Spanish, French, Swiss and American astronomers using the photometer on the James Gregory Telescope in Scotland; using visual comparisons to the nearby bright star HD 80408, the star's light curve was better defined. In combination with measurements of WASP-13's spectrum measured using the SOPHIE échelle spectrograph at the Haute-Provence Observatory in France, the star's radial velocity was also discovered. The Fibre-Fed Echelle Spectrograph on the Nordic Optical Telescope gathered additional measurements of WASP-13's spectrum, allowing astronomers to determine WASP-13's characteristics. Use of SOPHIE's data led to the discovery of the planet Cruinlagh in 2008; the planet was reported in 2009.

Based on SIMBAD's archive, WASP-13 was included in ten more papers between its discovery and 2010.

== Naming ==
The star was designated WASP-13 as it hosts a planet discovered through the Wide Angle Search for Planets programme.

In 2019 the IAU announced as part of NameExoWorlds that WASP-13 and its planet WASP-13b would be given official names chosen by school children from the UK. The chosen names were Gloas for WASP-13 and Cruinlagh for WASP-13b, the Manx words for 'to shine' and 'to orbit' respectively.

== Characteristics ==
WASP-13 is a sunlike, G-type star that is situated approximately 230 parsecs (750 light years) in the constellation Lynx. With an apparent magnitude of 10.42, the star cannot be seen with the unaided eye from the perspective of someone on Earth. The star's effective temperature, at 5,911 K, is slightly hotter than that of the Sun, and the radius of 1.58 R_{☉} is also larger, leading to a bolometric luminosity of 2.9 L_{☉}. However, its metallicity is similar; this can be seen in how the logarithm of the concentration of iron, or [Fe/H], is approximately 0. WASP-13 has a mass of 1.2 M_{☉} and the logarithm of its surface gravity is measured at 4.04 cgs, while the rate at which it rotates is at most 4.9 km/s.

The evolutionary status of WASP-13, as shown from its position in the Hertsprung-Russel diagram is near the main sequence turnoff, and it is considered very close to exhausting its core hydrogen and becoming a subgiant. Comparison with theoretical isochrones and stars with accurately-determined ages gives an age for WASP-13 of around 5.1 Gyr. Earlier estimates had given an older age, but with a very large uncertainty.

== Planetary system ==
WASP-13 has a planet that orbits its host star at a distance of 0.0558 AU, or approximately 5.58% of the mean distance between the Earth and Sun. The planet completes an orbit every 4.35301 days, or approximately 4 days and 8.5 hours. Cruinlagh's estimated mass is 0.53 times the mass of Jupiter, while its radius is about 1.53 times that of the planet.

The WASP-13 planetary system
Companion (in order from star)	Mass	Semimajor axis (AU)	Orbital period (days)	Eccentricity	Inclination (°)	Radius
b / Cruinlagh	0.525+0.035 −0.037 M_{J}	0.0558+0.0018 −0.0019	4.353011(13)	<0.016	84.88±0.45	1.528±0.084 R_{J}
