= NGC 2798 =

Galaxy in the constellation Lynx

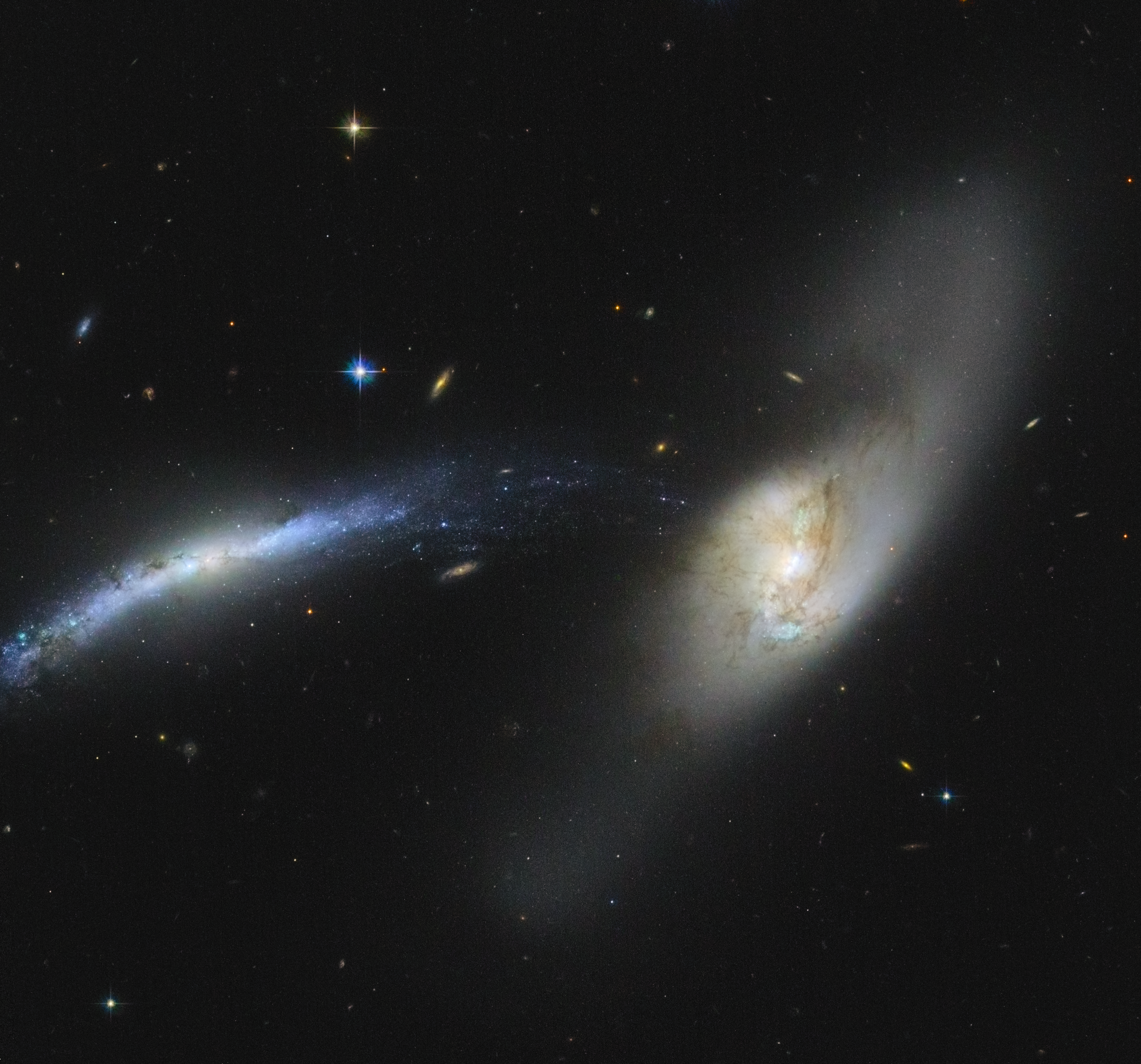
- NGC 2799 (left) and NGC 2798 (right) by NASA/ESA/SDSS/Judy Schmidt

Observation data (J2000 epoch)
- Constellation: Lynx
- Right ascension: 09^{h} 17^{m} 22^{s}
- Declination: +41° 59′ 58″
- Redshift: 0.005757
- Heliocentric radial velocity: 1726 ± 10 km/s
- Apparent magnitude (V): 12.32
- Apparent magnitude (B): 13.04

Characteristics
- Type: SB(s)a pec

Other designations
- NGC 2798, Arp 283, IRAS F09141+4212, 2MASX J09172295+4159589, UGC 4905, PGC 26232

NGC 2798 is a barred spiral galaxy in the constellation Lynx. NGC 2798 and NGC 2799 are listed under the Arp Catalogue as Arp 283 and noted as an "interacting galaxy pair". The galaxy is listed in the New General Catalogue.
