= Lynx Supercluster =

The Lynx Supercluster was discovered in 1999 as ClG J0848+4453, a name now used to describe the western cluster, with ClG J0849+4452 being the eastern one. It contains at least two clusters, designated RXJ 0848.9+4452 (at redshift z=1.26) and RXJ 0848.6+4453 (redshift z=1.27) . At the time of discovery, it was the most distant known supercluster with a comoving distance of 12.9 billion light years. Additionally, seven smaller groups of galaxies are associated with the supercluster. Through electromagnetic radiation and how it reacts with matter, we have been able to find three groupings of stars and two x-ray clusters within the Lynx.

The observation of the Lynx Supercluster has allowed other locations in proximity to be found. These locations are of special interest because of their high density, which has turned into the discovery of the seven smaller groups of galaxies mentioned above.

A study has been conducted between the clusters in the Lynx, to examine and compare their color and shift.
