= 10 Ursae Majoris =

Star in the constellation Lynx

- Location of 10 UMa (circled in red)

Observation data Epoch J2000 Equinox ICRS
- Constellation: Lynx
- Right ascension: 09^{h} 00^{m} 38.38067^{s}
- Declination: +41° 46′ 58.6051″
- Apparent magnitude (V): 3.960 (4.18 / 6.48)

Characteristics
- Spectral type: F3V + K0V
- U−B color index: +0.04
- B−V color index: +0.43

Astrometry
Radial velocity (R_{v})	26.4 ± 0.9 km/s
Proper motion (μ)	RA: -474.31 mas/yr Dec.: -204.21 mas/yr
Parallax (π)	62.23±0.68 mas
Distance	52.4 ± 0.6 ly (16.1 ± 0.2 pc)
Absolute magnitude (M_{V})	+2.93

Orbit
Period (P)	7691.0 ± 1.8 d
Semi-major axis (a)	0.64566 ± 0.00056″
Eccentricity (e)	0.15075 ± 0.00084
Inclination (i)	131.366 ± 0.099°
Longitude of the node (Ω)	203.74 ± 0.10°
Periastron epoch (T)	JD 2449263.1 ± 9.1
Argument of periastron (ω) (secondary)	32.30 ± 0.44°

Details

10 UMa A
Mass	1.44 M_{☉}
Radius	1.518 (Note: Calculated, using the Stefan-Boltzmann law and the star's effective temperature and luminosity, with respect to the solar nominal effective temperature of 5,772 K: $$\sqrt{\biggl(\frac{5,772}{6,740}\biggr)^4 \cdot 4.285} = 1.518\ R_\odot.$$ $$\sqrt{\biggl(\frac{5,772}{5,250}\biggr)^4 \cdot 0.638} = 0.965\ R_\odot.$$) R_{☉}
Luminosity	4.285 L_{☉}
Temperature	6740 K

10 UMa B
Mass	0.89 M_{☉}
Radius	0.965 R_{☉}
Luminosity	0.638 L_{☉}
Temperature	5250 K

Other designations
- 10 UMa, BD+42°1956, FK5 339, GJ 332, HD 76943, HIP 44248, HR 3579, SAO 42642

Database references
SIMBAD	10 UMa
ARICNS	10 UMa A
- 10 UMa B

10 Ursae Majoris is a binary star system in the northern constellation of Lynx. It is visible to the naked eye as a faint star with a combined apparent visual magnitude of 3.960. This system is fairly close to the Sun, at 53 light-years (16.1 pc) away from Earth. It is the third-brightest object in Lynx. John Flamsteed, England’s first Astronomer Royal, wrongly catalogued this star as part of Ursa Major, hence its designation. The system is moving further from the Earth with a heliocentric radial velocity of 26.4 km/s. It is a probable member of the Hyades supercluster.

This is a spectroscopic binary—orbital motion from the two stars can be detected by Doppler shifts in their spectra. In this case, the two stars can also be split by differential astrometry. The magnitude 4.18 primary has a mass of 1.44 M_{☉} and the fainter secondary, 0.89 M_{☉}. The primary is an F-type main-sequence star radiating 4.3 times the Sun's luminosity, and the magnitude 6.48 secondary is K-type with 0.6 times the luminosity of the Sun. The two orbit each other every 21.057 years with an eccentricity of 0.15.
