= Markarian 231 =

Seyfert galaxy in the constellation Ursa Major

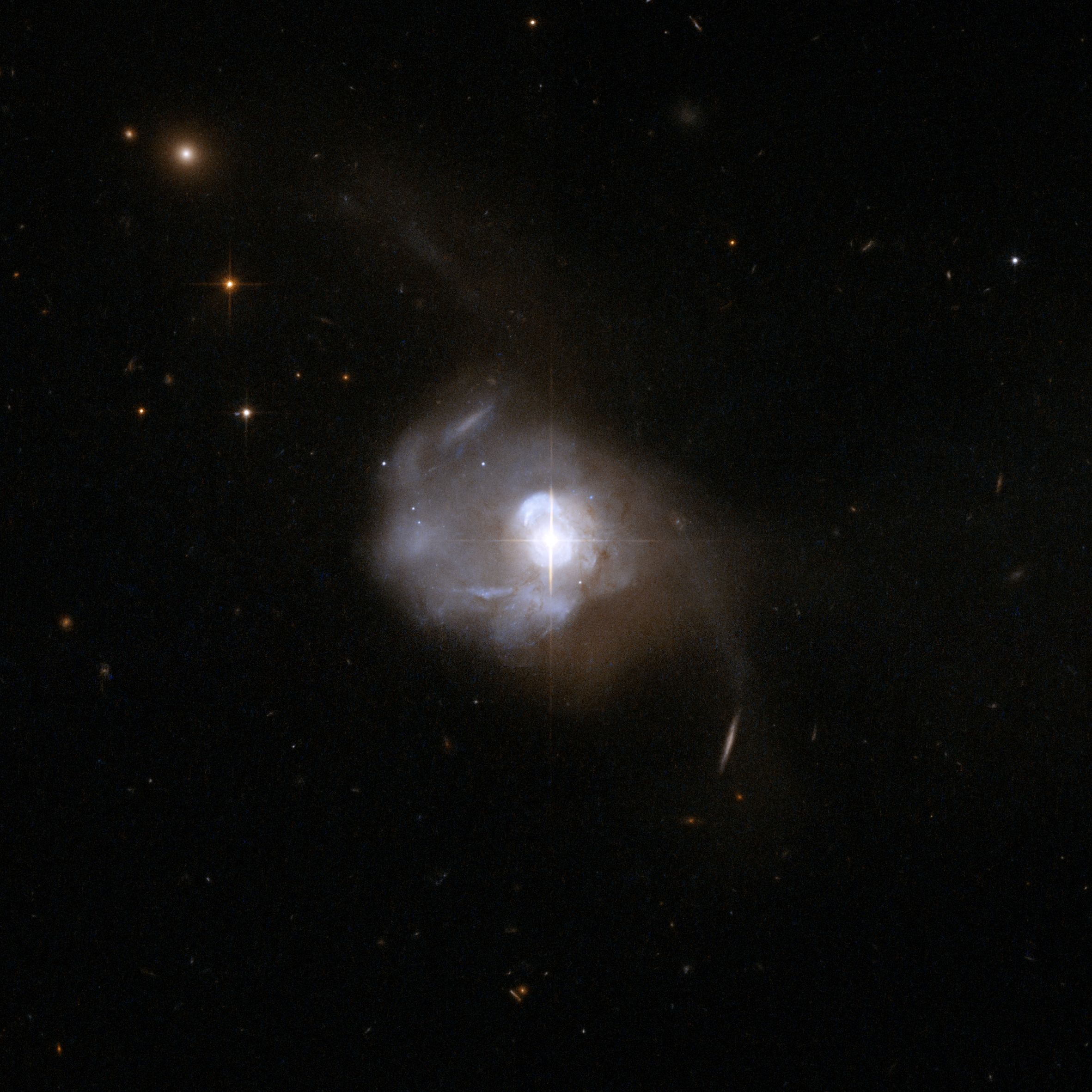
- Hubble Space Telescope image of Markarian 231

Observation data (J2000 epoch)
- Constellation: Ursa Major
- Right ascension: 12^{h} 56^{m} 14.23410^{s}
- Declination: +56° 52′ 25.2386″
- Redshift: 0.04147
- Heliocentric radial velocity: 12173 km/s
- Distance: 581 Mly, 178 Mpc
- Apparent magnitude (V): 13.84

Characteristics
- Type: Sc/quasar

Other designations
- UGC 8058, Mrk 231, Mkn 231, Markarian 231, MCG+10-19-004, ZW VII 490, PGC 44117

Markarian 231 (UGC 8058) is a Type-1 Seyfert galaxy that was discovered in 1969 as part of a search for galaxies with strong ultraviolet radiation. It is object number 231 in a catalog of similar galaxies (the First Byurakan Survey) published by the Armenian astronomer Benjamin Markarian, who played an active role in identifying and cataloging a number of active galaxies during the 1960s. Markarian 231 contains the nearest known quasar and is located about 581 million light years away from Earth, in the constellation of Ursa Major.

== Characteristics ==
Markarian 231 is undergoing an energetic starburst. A nuclear ring at the center has an active rate of star formation of greater than 100 solar masses per year. It is one of the most ultraluminous infrared galaxies, with power derived from an accreting black hole in the center forming the closest known quasar. X-ray data shows the energy released from the black hole produces ultra-fast outflows with a velocity of −20,000 km s^{−1}.

The galaxy contains a curved radio jet interacting with the interstellar medium. Its position angle switches to −172° when reaching a projected distance of 25 pc. The Very Long Baseline Array found a triple radio source in Markarian 231.

A 2015 study suggested the central black hole of 150 million solar masses has a black hole companion of 4 million solar masses, and that they orbit each other every 1.2 years. However, that model has been contested as unfeasible in 2016.

Submillimetre astronomy has found evidence of molecular oxygen (O2), the first time molecular oxygen has been detected outside of the Milky Way galaxy. The Herschel Space Observatory showed water vapor in the galaxy's emission.

== See also ==
- List of galaxies
