= Lynx (constellation) =

Constellation in the northern celestial hemisphere

- Constellation
- List of stars in Lynx
- Abbreviation: Lyn
- Genitive: Lyncis
- Pronunciation: /ˈlɪŋks/, genitive /ˈlɪnsɪs/
- Symbolism: the Lynx
- Right ascension: 8^{h}
- Declination: +45°
- Quadrant: NQ2
- Area: 545 sq. deg. (28th)
- Main stars: 4
- Bayer/Flamsteed stars: 42
- Stars brighter than 3.00^{m}: 0
- Stars within 10.00 pc (32.62 ly): 1
- Brightest star: α Lyn (3.14^{m})
- Nearest star: GJ 1105 (LHS 1963)
- Messier objects: 0
- Meteor showers: Alpha Lyncids; September Lyncids
- Bordering constellations: Ursa Major; Camelopardalis; Auriga; Gemini; Cancer; Leo (corner); Leo Minor
- Visible at latitudes between +90° and −55°. Best visible at 21:00 (9 p.m.) during the month of February.

Lynx is a constellation named after the animal, usually observed in the Northern Celestial Hemisphere. The constellation was introduced in the late 17th century by Johannes Hevelius. It is a faint constellation, with its brightest stars forming a zigzag line. The orange giant Alpha Lyncis is the brightest star in the constellation, and the semiregular variable star Y Lyncis is a target for amateur astronomers. Six star systems have been found to contain planets. Those of 6 Lyncis and HD 75898 were discovered by the Doppler method; those of XO-2, XO-4, XO-5 and WASP-13 were observed as they passed in front of the host star.

Within the constellation's borders lie NGC 2419, an unusually remote globular cluster; the galaxy NGC 2770, which has hosted three recent Type Ib supernovae; the distant quasar APM 08279+5255, whose light is magnified and split into multiple images by the gravitational lensing effect of a foreground galaxy; and the Lynx Supercluster, which was the most distant supercluster known at the time of its discovery in 1999.

== History ==
Depictions on star charts

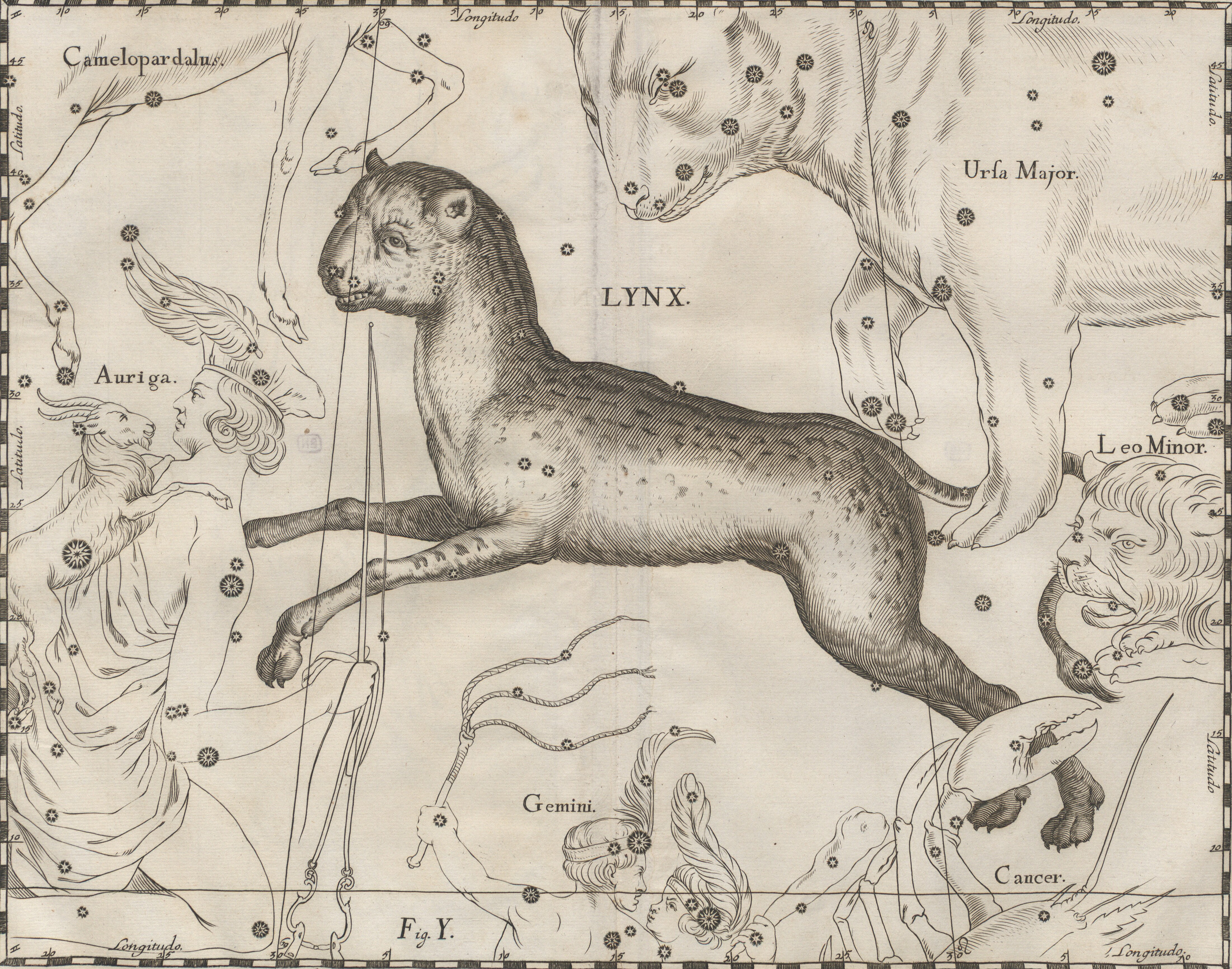
Earliest depiction of Lynx, in 1690

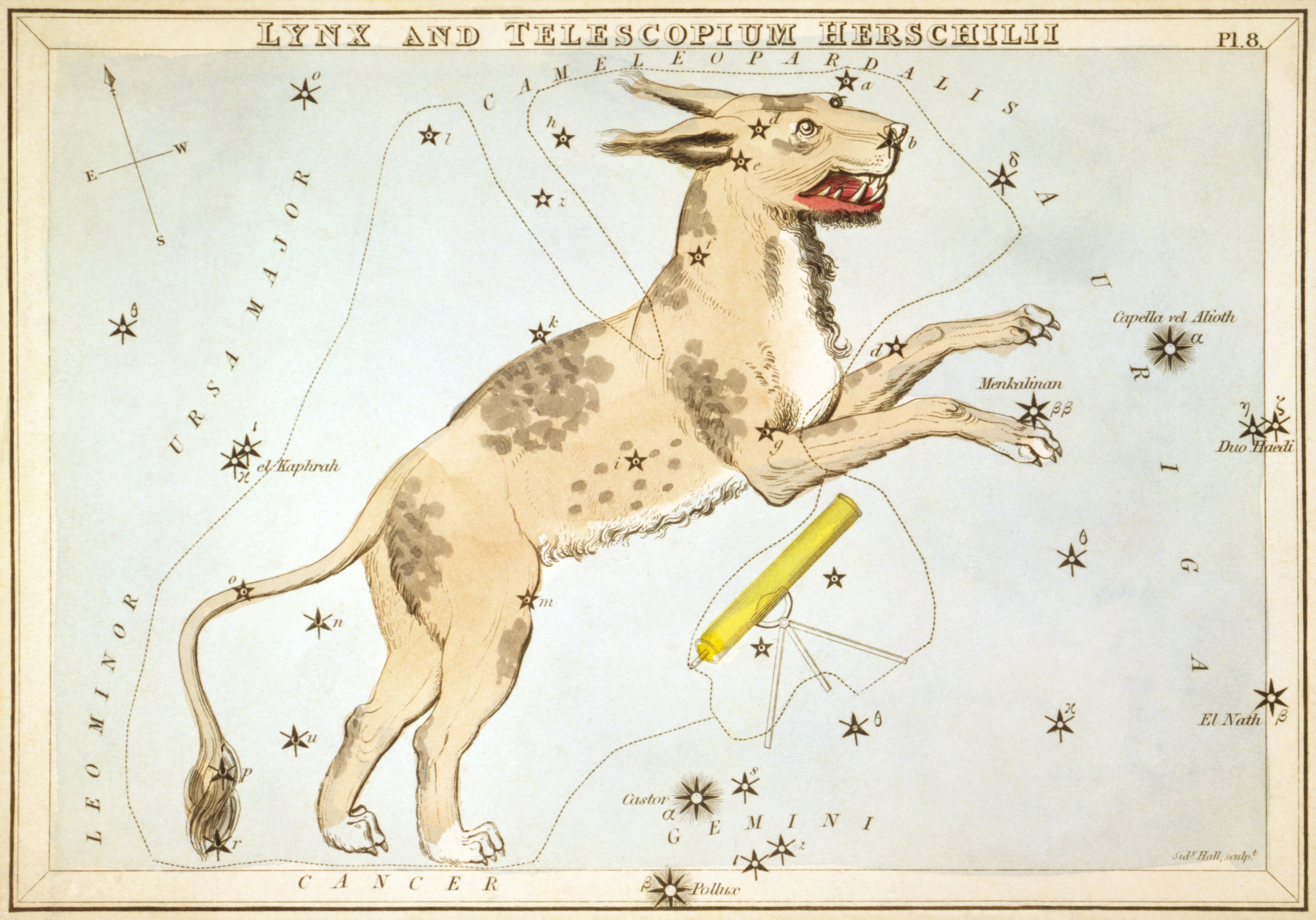
Illustration from Urania's Mirror (1825). The obsolete constellation Telescopium Herschelii is to its right.

Polish astronomer Johannes Hevelius formed the constellation in 1687 from 19 faint stars between the constellations Ursa Major and Auriga that earlier had been part of the obsolete constellation Jordanus Fluvius. Naming it Lynx because of its faintness, he challenged future stargazers to see it, declaring that only the lynx-eyed (those with good sight) would have been able to recognize it. Hevelius also used the name Tigris (Tiger) in his catalog but kept the former name only in his atlas. English astronomer John Flamsteed adopted the constellation in his catalog, published in 1712, and his subsequent atlas. According to 19th-century amateur astronomer Richard Hinckley Allen, the chief stars in Lynx "might well have been utilized by the modern constructor, whoever he was, of our Ursa Major to complete the quartette of feet."

== Characteristics ==
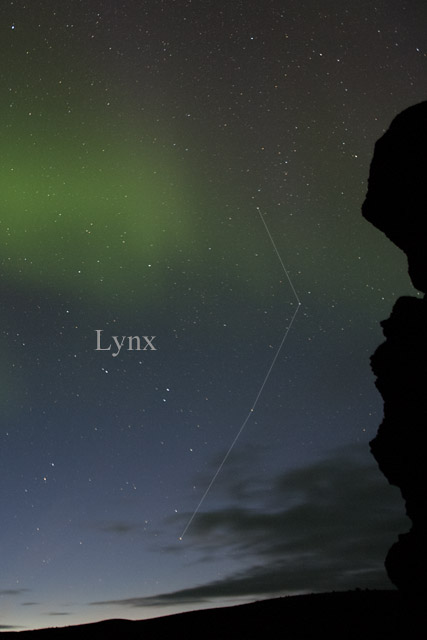
The constellation of Lynx as it can be seen by the naked eye

Lynx is bordered by Camelopardalis to the north, Auriga to the west, Gemini to the southwest, Cancer to the south, Leo to the east and Ursa Major to the northeast. Covering 545.4 square degrees and 1.322% of the night sky, it ranks 28th of the 88 constellations in size, surpassing better known constellations such as Gemini. The three-letter abbreviation for the constellation, as adopted by the International Astronomical Union in 1922, is "Lyn". The official constellation boundaries, as set by Belgian astronomer Eugène Delporte in 1930, (Note: Delporte had proposed standardising the constellation boundaries to the International Astronomical Union, who had agreed and gave him the lead role) are defined by a polygon of 20 segments (illustrated in infobox). In the equatorial coordinate system, the right ascension coordinates of these borders lie between 06^{h} 16^{m} 13.76^{s} and 09^{h} 42^{m} 50.22^{s}, and the declination coordinates are between +32.97° and +61.96°. On dark nights, the brighter stars can be seen as a crooked line extending roughly between Camelopardalis and Leo, and north of the bright star Castor. Lynx is most readily observed from the late winter to late summer to northern hemisphere observers, with midnight culmination occurring on 20 January. The whole constellation is visible to observers north of latitude 28°S. (Note: While parts of the constellation technically rise above the horizon to observers between 28°S and 57°S, stars within a few degrees of the horizon are to all intents and purposes unobservable.)

== Features ==
=== Stars ===
English astronomer Francis Baily gave a single star a Bayer designation—Alpha Lyncis—while Flamsteed numbered 44 stars, though several lie across the boundary in Ursa Major. Overall, there are 97 stars within the constellation's borders brighter than or equal to apparent magnitude 6.5. (Note: Objects of magnitude 6.5 are among the faintest visible to the unaided eye in suburban-rural transition night skies.)

The brightest star in this constellation is Alpha Lyncis, with an apparent (visual) magnitude of 3.14. It is an orange giant of spectral type K7III located 203 ± 2 light-years distant from Earth. Around twice as massive as the Sun, it has exhausted the hydrogen at its core and has evolved away from the main sequence. The star has swollen to about 55 times the Sun's radius and is emitting roughly 673 times the luminosity of the Sun. The stellar atmosphere has cooled, giving it a surface temperature of 3,880 K. The only star with a proper name is Alsciaukat (from the Arabic for thorn), also known as 31 Lyncis, located 380 ± 10 light-years from Earth. This star is also an evolved giant with around twice the Sun's mass that has swollen and cooled since exhausting its core hydrogen. It is anywhere from 59 to 75 times as wide as the Sun, and 740 times as luminous. Alsciaukat is also a variable star, ranging in brightness by 0.05 magnitude over 25 to 30 days from its baseline magnitude of 4.25.

Lynx is rich in double stars. The second brightest star in the constellation is 38 Lyncis at magnitude 3.8. When viewed through a moderate telescope, the two components—a brighter blue-white star of magnitude 3.9 and a fainter star of magnitude 6.1 that has been described as lilac as well as blue-white—can be seen. 15 Lyncis is another star that is found to be a double system when viewed through a telescope, separating into two yellowish stars of magnitudes 4.7 and 5.8 that are 0.9 arcseconds apart. The components are a yellow giant of spectral type G8III that is around 4.01 times as massive as the Sun, and a yellow-white main sequence star of spectral type F8V that is around 3.73 times as massive as the Sun. Orbiting each other every 262 years, the stars are 178 ± 2 light years distant from Earth. 12 Lyncis has a combined apparent magnitude of 4.87. When seen through a telescope, it can be separated into three stars: two components with magnitudes 5.4 and 6.0 that lie at an angular separation by 1.8″ (as of 1992) and a yellow-hued star of magnitude 7.2 at a separation of 8.6″ (as of 1990). The two brighter stars are estimated to orbit each other with a period that is poorly known but estimated to be roughly 700 to 900 years. The 12 Lyncis system is 210 ± 10 light years distant from Earth.

10 Ursae Majoris is the third-brightest star in Lynx. Originally in the neighbouring constellation Ursa Major, it became part of Lynx with the official establishment of the constellation's borders. Appearing to be of magnitude 3.97, a telescope reveals a yellow-white main sequence star of spectral type F4V of magnitude 4.11 and a star very similar to the Sun of spectral type G5V and magnitude 6.18. The two are 10.6 astronomical units (au) (Note: The distance between the Earth and the Sun is one astronomical unit) apart and orbit each other every 21.78 years. The system is 52.4 ± 0.6 light-years distant from Earth. Likewise 16 Lyncis was originally known as Psi^{10} Aurigae and conversely, 37, 39, 41 and 44 Lyncis became part of Ursa Major.

Y Lyncis is a popular target among amateur astronomers, as it is a semiregular variable ranging in brightness from magnitude 6.2 to 8.9. These shifts in brightness are complex, with a shorter period of 110 days due to the star's pulsations, and a longer period of 1400 days possibly due to the star's rotation or regular cycles in its convection. A red supergiant, it has an estimated diameter around 580 times that of the Sun, is around 1.5 to 2 times as massive, and has a luminosity around 25,000 times that of the Sun. 1 Lyncis and UX Lyncis are red giants that are also semiregular variables with complex fluctuations in brightness.

=== Exoplanets ===
Six star systems have been found to contain exoplanets, of which two were discovered by the Doppler method and four by the transit method. 6 Lyncis, an orange subgiant that spent much of its life as an A-type or F-type main sequence star, is orbited by a planet with a minimum mass of 2.4 Jupiter masses and an orbital period of 899 days. HD 75898 is a 3.8 ± 0.8 billion-year-old yellow star of spectral type G0V that has just begun expanding and cooling off the main sequence. It has a planet at least 2.51 times as massive as Jupiter orbiting with a period of around 418 days. The centre of mass of the system is accelerating, indicating there is a third, more distant, component at least the size of Jupiter. Three star systems were found to have planets that were observed by the XO Telescope in Hawaii as they passed in front of them. XO-2 is a binary star system, both the stars of which are slightly less massive and cooler than the Sun and have planetary companions: XO-2S has a Saturn-mass planet at 0.13 au distance with a period of around 18 days, and one a little more massive than Jupiter at a distance of 0.48 au and with a period of around 120 days, and XO-2N has a hot Jupiter with around half Jupiter's mass that has an orbit of only 2.6 days. XO-4 is an F-type main sequence star that is a little hotter and more massive than the Sun that has a hot Jupiter orbiting with a period of around 4.1 days. XO-5 is a Sun-like star with a hot Jupiter about as massive as Jupiter that takes around 4.2 days to complete an orbit. WASP-13, a Sun-like star that has begun to swell and cool off the main sequence, had a transiting planet discovered by the SuperWASP program in 2009. The planet is around half as massive as Jupiter and takes 4.35 days to complete a revolution.

=== Deep-sky objects ===
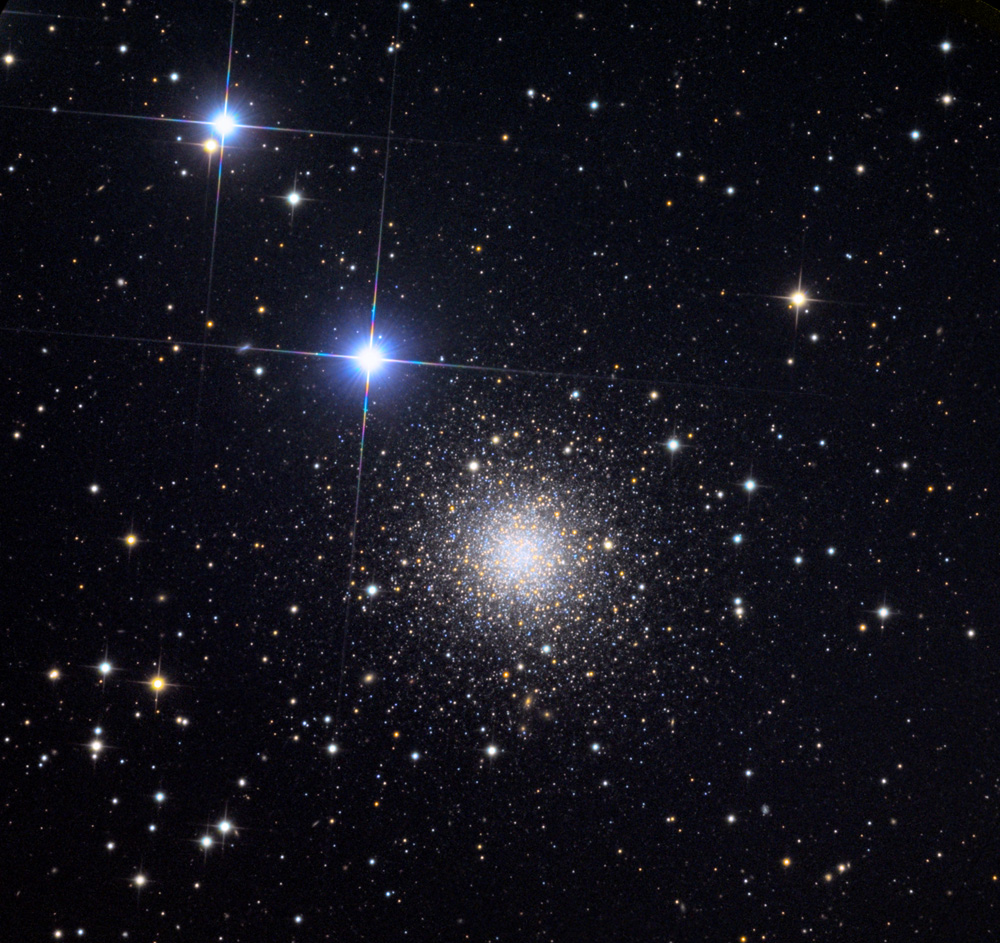
NGC 2419 (Credit: Adam Block/Mount Lemmon SkyCenter/University of Arizona)

Lynx's most notable deep sky object is NGC 2419, also called the "Intergalactic Wanderer" as it was assumed to lie outside the Milky Way. At a distance of between 275,000 and 300,000 light-years from Earth, it is one of the most distant known globular clusters within our galaxy. NGC 2419 is likely in a highly elliptical orbit around the Milky Way. It has a magnitude of +9.06 and is a Shapley class VII cluster. Originally thought to be a star, NGC 2419 was discovered to be a globular cluster by American astronomer Carl Lampland.

NGC 2537, known as the Bear's Paw Galaxy, lies about 3 degrees north-northwest of 31 Lyncis. It is a blue compact dwarf galaxy that is somewhere between 17 and 30 million light-years away from Earth. Close by is IC 2233, a very flat and thin spiral galaxy that is between 26 and 40 million light-years away from Earth. A comparatively quiet galaxy with a low rate of star formation (less than one solar mass every twenty years), it was long suspected to be interacting with the Bear's Paw galaxy. This is now considered highly unlikely as observations with the Very Large Array showed the two galaxies lie at different distances.

The NGC 2841 group is a group of galaxies that lie both in Lynx and neighbouring Ursa Major. It includes the loose triplet NGC 2541, NGC 2500, and NGC 2552 within Lynx. Using cepheids of NGC 2541 as standard candles, the distance to that galaxy (and the group) has been estimated at around 40 million light–years. NGC 2841 itself lies in Ursa Major.

NGC 2770 is a type SASc spiral galaxy located about 88 million light–years away that has hosted Type Ib supernovae: SN 1999eh, SN 2007uy, and SN 2008D. The last of these is famous for being the first supernova detected by the X-rays released very early on in its formation, rather than by the optical light emitted during later stages, which allowed the first moments of the outburst to be observed. It is possible that NGC 2770's interactions with a suspected companion galaxy may have created the massive stars causing this activity. UGC 4904 is a galaxy located about 77 million light-years from Earth. On 20 October 2004, a supernova impostor was observed by Japanese amateur astronomer Kōichi Itagaki within the galaxy. Observations of its spectrum suggest that it shed massive amounts of material in a two-year period, transforming from a LBV star to a Wolf–Rayet star, before it was observed erupting as hypernova SN 2006jc on October 11, 2006.

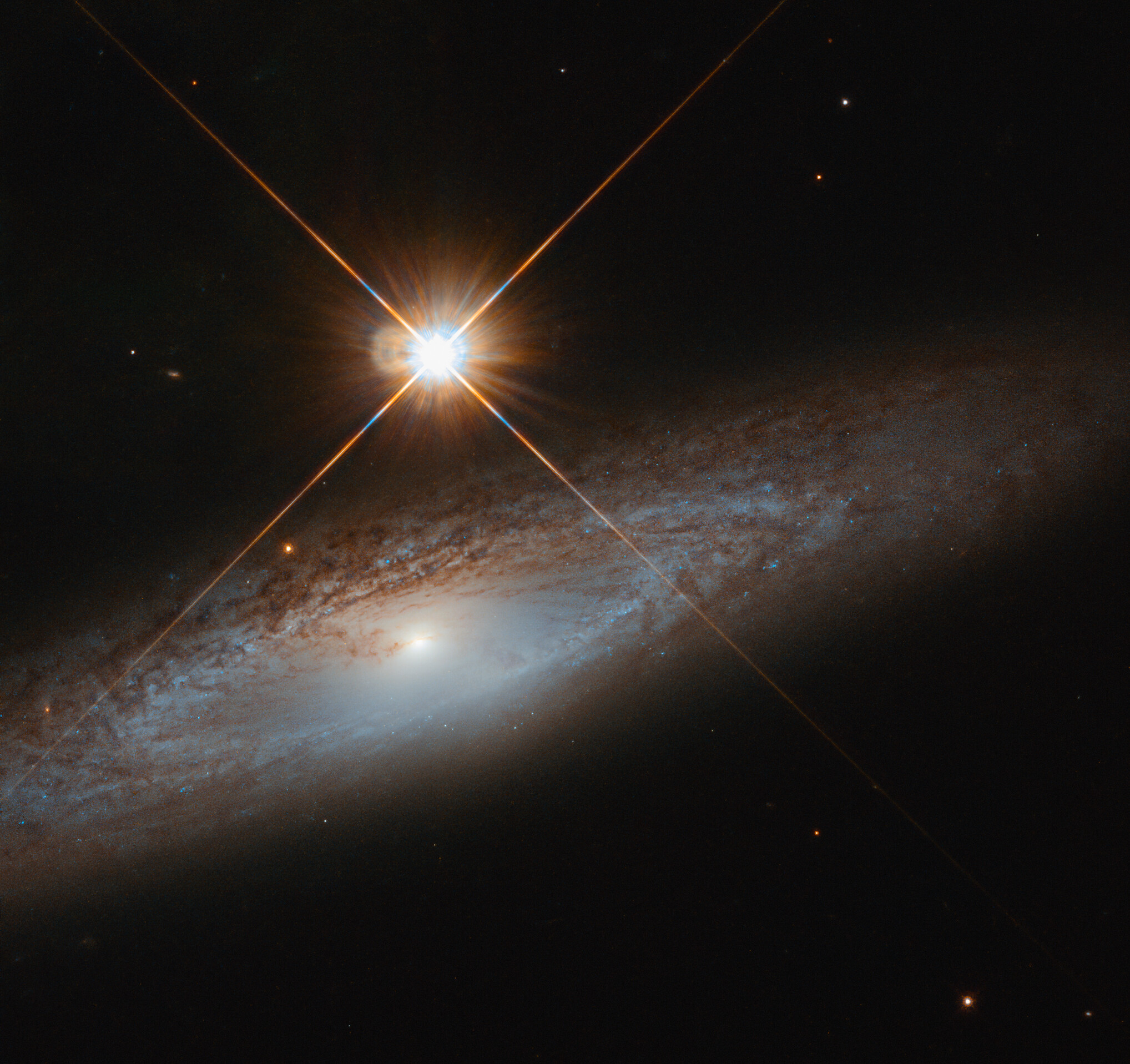
Galaxy UGC 3855 captured by the NASA/ESA Hubble Space Telescope.

APM 08279+5255 is a very distant, broad absorption line quasar discovered in 1998 and initially considered the most luminous object yet found. It is magnified and split into multiple images by the gravitational lensing effect of a foreground galaxy through which its light passes. It appears to be a giant elliptical galaxy with a supermassive black hole around 23 billion times as massive as the Sun and an associated accretion disk that has a diameter of 3600 light years. The galaxy possesses large regions of hot dust and molecular gas, as well as regions with starburst activity. It has a cosmological redshift of 3.911. (Note: Far distant objects are measured in redshift rather than light-years. See also Hubble's law) While observing the quasar in 2008, astronomers using ESA's XMM Newton and the Large Binocular Telescope (LBT) in Arizona discovered the huge galaxy cluster 2XMM J083026+524133.

The Lynx Supercluster is a remote supercluster with a redshift of 1.26–1.27. It was the most distant supercluster known at the time of its discovery in 1999. It is made up of two main clusters of galaxies—RX J0849+4452 or Lynx E and RX J0848+4453 or Lynx W—and several smaller clumps. Further still lies the Lynx Arc, located around 12 billion light years away (a redshift of 3.357). It is a distant region containing a million extremely hot, young blue stars with surface temperatures of 80,000–100,000 K that are twice as hot as similar stars in the Milky Way galaxy. Only visible through gravitational lensing produced by a closer cluster of galaxies, the Arc is a feature of the early days of the universe, when "furious firestorms of star birth" were more common.

=== Meteor showers ===
The September Lyncids are a minor meteor shower that appears around 6 September. They were historically more prominent, described as such by Chinese observers in 1037 and 1063, and Korean astronomers in 1560. The Alpha Lyncids were discovered in 1971 by Malcolm Currie, and appear between 10 December and 3 January.

== See also ==
- 88 modern constellations by area
- Asterism (astronomy)
- List of constellations
- Lynx (Chinese astronomy)
- NGC 2798
