= List of stars in Lynx =

This is the list of notable stars in the constellation Lynx, sorted by decreasing brightness.

Name	B	F	Var	HD	HIP	RA	Dec	vis. mag.	abs. mag.	Dist. (ly)	Sp. class	Notes
α Lyn	α	40		80493	45860	09^{h} 21^{m} 03.46^{s}	+34° 23′ 33.1″	3.14	−1.02	222	K7IIIvar	suspected variable
38 Lyn		38		80081	45688	09^{h} 18^{m} 50.67^{s}	+36° 48′ 10.4″	3.82	0.96	122	A1V	
10 UMa		(10)		76943	44248	09^{h} 00^{m} 38.75^{s}	+41° 47′ 00.4″	3.96	2.88	54	F5V	
31 Lyn		31	BN	70272	41075	08^{h} 22^{m} 50.13^{s}	+43° 11′ 18.1″	4.25	−1.13	389	K4.5III	Alsciaukat, Mabsuthat; semiregular variable, V_{max} = 4.21^{m}, V_{min} = 4.27^{m}
15 Lyn		15		50522	33449	06^{h} 57^{m} 16.60^{s}	+58° 25′ 23.0″	4.35	0.76	170	G5III-IV	
2 Lyn		2	UZ	43378	30060	06^{h} 19^{m} 37.39^{s}	+59° 00′ 39.3″	4.44	1.14	149	A2Vs	eclipsing binary and δ Sct variable, V_{max} = 4.43^{m}, V_{min} = 4.73^{m}
HD 77912				77912	44700	09^{h} 06^{m} 31.79^{s}	+38° 27′ 08.1″	4.56	−2.03	678	G8Ib-II	
21 Lyn		21		58142	36145	07^{h} 26^{m} 42.86^{s}	+49° 12′ 41.9″	4.61	0.20	249	A1V	suspected variable
27 Lyn		27		67006	39847	08^{h} 08^{m} 27.50^{s}	+51° 30′ 24.0″	4.78	0.65	218	A2V	suspected variable
HD 82741				82741	47029	09^{h} 35^{m} 03.85^{s}	+39° 37′ 17.2″	4.81	0.58	229	K0III	
12 Lyn		12		48250	32438	06^{h} 46^{m} 14.15^{s}	+59° 26′ 30.1″	4.86	0.63	229	A3V	
ψ^{10} Aur	(ψ^{10})	16		50973	33485	06^{h} 57^{m} 37.12^{s}	+45° 05′ 38.8″	4.90	0.71	225	A2Vn	suspected variable
24 Lyn		24		61497	37609	07^{h} 43^{m} 00.46^{s}	+58° 42′ 37.8″	4.93	0.62	237	A3IVn	
1 Lyn		1	UW	42973	29919	06^{h} 17^{m} 54.83^{s}	+61° 30′ 55.1″	4.95	−1.34	590	M3III	slow irregular variable, ΔV = 0.11^{m}
HD 56169				56169	35384	07^{h} 18^{m} 31.98^{s}	+49° 27′ 53.1″	5.00	0.20	297	A4IIIn	
35 Lyn		35		75506	43531	08^{h} 51^{m} 56.84^{s}	+43° 43′ 35.4″	5.15	0.53	274	K0III	
DU Lyn			DU	62647	37946	07^{h} 46^{m} 39.26^{s}	+37° 31′ 02.5″	5.18	0.18	326	M3III	semiregular variable, ΔV = 0.13^{m}
18 Lyn		18		55280	35146	07^{h} 15^{m} 55.02^{s}	+59° 38′ 17.1″	5.20	1.34	193	K2III	
5 Lyn		5		44708	30679	06^{h} 26^{m} 48.88^{s}	+58° 25′ 02.7″	5.21	−1.39	682	K4III	
42 Lyn		42		83287	47300	09^{h} 38^{m} 21.79^{s}	+40° 14′ 23.2″	5.28	2.36	125	F0V	
50 Cam		(50)		61931	37701	07^{h} 44^{m} 04.19^{s}	+50° 26′ 01.9″	5.31	−1.32	689	A0IIIn	
36 Lyn		36	EI	79158	45290	09^{h} 13^{m} 48.23^{s}	+43° 13′ 04.5″	5.32	−0.90	573	B8IIIMNp	SX Arietis variable, ΔV = 0.03^{m}, P = 3.83 d
13 Lyn		13		48432	32489	06^{h} 46^{m} 49.49^{s}	+57° 10′ 09.4″	5.34	1.32	208	K0III	
14 Lyn A		14		49618	33048	06^{h} 53^{m} 05.06^{s}	+59° 26′ 55.2″	5.34	−0.31	441	G4III...	component of the 14 Lyn system
22 Lyn		22		58855	36439	07^{h} 29^{m} 55.86^{s}	+49° 40′ 21.6″	5.35	3.86	65	F6V	
34 Lyn		34		73593	42604	08^{h} 41^{m} 01.05^{s}	+45° 50′ 01.6″	5.35	1.64	180	G0IV	
UY Lyn			UY	54895	34912	07^{h} 13^{m} 23.39^{s}	+51° 25′ 43.4″	5.47	−1.40	773	M3III	slow irregular variable, V_{max} = 5.47^{m}, V_{min} = 5.55^{m}
26 Lyn		26		64144	38639	07^{h} 54^{m} 42.74^{s}	+47° 33′ 52.5″	5.47	−0.49	508	K4III	
HD 70313				70313	41152	08^{h} 23^{m} 48.53^{s}	+53° 13′ 11.8″	5.52	1.97	168	A3V	suspected variable
RR Lyn			RR	44691	30651	06^{h} 26^{m} 25.86^{s}	+56° 17′ 06.2″	5.53	0.93	271	A3m	Algol variable, V_{max} = 5.52^{m}, V_{min} = 6.03^{m}, P = 9.95 d
HD 48766				48766	32609	06^{h} 48^{m} 12.23^{s}	+55° 42′ 16.0″	5.54	2.18	153	F5V:+...	
HD 55575				55575	35136	07^{h} 15^{m} 50.11^{s}	+47° 14′ 25.5″	5.54	4.41	55	G0V	
HD 61363				61363	37441	07^{h} 41^{m} 12.45^{s}	+48° 07′ 54.7″	5.58	0.58	326	K0III	
43 Lyn		43		83805	47570	09^{h} 42^{m} 00.38^{s}	+39° 45′ 28.7″	5.61	0.52	340	G8III	
29 Lyn		29		68930	40646	08^{h} 17^{m} 50.42^{s}	+59° 34′ 16.1″	5.63	0.78	304	A7IV	
HD 60437				60437	37023	07^{h} 36^{m} 31.66^{s}	+46° 10′ 49.3″	5.66	−0.35	518	M0III	
HD 58661				58661	36348	07^{h} 28^{m} 51.49^{s}	+48° 11′ 02.5″	5.70	0.20	410	B9MNp...	suspected variable
HD 76291				76291	43923	08^{h} 56^{m} 50.06^{s}	+45° 37′ 54.3″	5.72	1.48	229	K1IV	
HD 56963				56963	35643	07^{h} 21^{m} 17.54^{s}	+45° 13′ 41.4″	5.74	3.05	112	A7s	
33 Lyn		33		72524	42090	08^{h} 34^{m} 43.90^{s}	+36° 25′ 11.0″	5.76	0.80	321	A2Vnn	
HD 61294				61294	37369	07^{h} 40^{m} 14.72^{s}	+38° 20′ 40.4″	5.77	−1.22	815	M0III	suspected variable
HD 65301				65301	39221	08^{h} 01^{m} 20.75^{s}	+59° 02′ 50.3″	5.78	2.58	142	F2:V:	
19 Lyn		19		57103	35785	07^{h} 22^{m} 52.06^{s}	+55° 16′ 53.3″	5.80	0.01	468	B8V	
HD 57646				57646	35984	07^{h} 24^{m} 57.08^{s}	+51° 53′ 14.4″	5.80	−1.93	1148	K5III	
6 Lyn		6		45410	31039	06^{h} 30^{m} 47.14^{s}	+58° 09′ 48.4″	5.86	2.08	186	K0IV	has a planet (b)
11 Lyn		11		46590	31665	06^{h} 37^{m} 38.40^{s}	+56° 51′ 27.0″	5.87	0.90	322	A2V	
HD 68077				68077	40305	08^{h} 13^{m} 50.20^{s}	+56° 27′ 08.3″	5.88	−0.03	495	G9III	suspected variable
HD 72184				72184	41935	08^{h} 32^{m} 55.06^{s}	+38° 01′ 00.4″	5.88	1.84	210	K2III	
30 Lyn		30		69548	40875	08^{h} 20^{m} 26.00^{s}	+57° 44′ 35.7″	5.89	3.39	103	F4V	
HD 76292				76292	43894	08^{h} 56^{m} 30.58^{s}	+40° 12′ 05.6″	5.90	1.60	236	F3III	
HD 67224				67224	39995	08^{h} 10^{m} 03.80^{s}	+58° 14′ 54.3″	5.91	−0.27	560	K4III:	suspected variable
HD 55866				55866	35304	07^{h} 17^{m} 33.72^{s}	+52° 07′ 52.0″	5.93	−0.43	609	K1III:	
HD 60294				60294	37046	07^{h} 36^{m} 47.05^{s}	+55° 45′ 18.6″	5.93	1.26	280	K2III	
HD 60652				60652	37140	07^{h} 37^{m} 53.88^{s}	+48° 46′ 26.1″	5.93	1.40	262	A5m	suspected variable
8 Lyn		8		46480	31676	06^{h} 37^{m} 41.64^{s}	+61° 28′ 54.8″	5.94	2.31	173	G8IV-V	
HD 80024				80024	45661	09^{h} 18^{m} 25.94^{s}	+35° 21′ 50.9″	5.94	−0.01	505	A8V	
HD 78366				78366	44897	09^{h} 08^{m} 51.20^{s}	+33° 52′ 57.0″	5.95	4.54	62	F9V	
HD 75523				75523	43553	08^{h} 52^{m} 11.78^{s}	+45° 18′ 46.4″	5.96	−0.13	538	K0III	
HD 75556				75556	43550	08^{h} 52^{m} 10.05^{s}	+42° 00′ 10.4″	5.98	0.14	479	K0III	
19 UMa		(19)		79452	45412	09^{h} 15^{m} 14.36^{s}	+34° 38′ 00.2″	5.98	0.26	455	G6III	
HD 70647				70647	41224	08^{h} 24^{m} 42.77^{s}	+42° 00′ 18.8″	6.02	−1.51	1045	K5III	suspected variable
HD 50551				50551	33444	06^{h} 57^{m} 13.12^{s}	+57° 33′ 47.7″	6.03	−0.53	669	K3III	suspected variable
HD 63332				63332	38325	07^{h} 51^{m} 05.75^{s}	+54° 07′ 44.8″	6.03	3.64	98	F6V	
4 Lyn		4		43812	30272	06^{h} 22^{m} 03.56^{s}	+59° 22′ 19.6″	6.05	0.49	422	A3V	
HD 70771				70771	41262	08^{h} 25^{m} 04.90^{s}	+35° 00′ 41.2″	6.08	−0.62	713	K0	
23 Lyn		23		61106	37406	07^{h} 40^{m} 49.56^{s}	+57° 04′ 58.4″	6.09	−0.56	698	K5III	
HD 80441				80441	45858	09^{h} 20^{m} 59.40^{s}	+38° 11′ 17.9″	6.12	2.72	156	F3V+...	
CY Lyn			CY	75896	43685	08^{h} 53^{m} 55.70^{s}	+35° 32′ 18.0″	6.14	−1.18	950	A4III	rotating ellipsoidal variable
HD 52859				52859	34217	07^{h} 05^{m} 39.83^{s}	+52° 45′ 31.3″	6.17	1.04	347	A3Vs	
HD 71906				71906	41798	08^{h} 31^{m} 19.98^{s}	+37° 15′ 54.1″	6.18	−0.74	789	A0V	variable star, ΔV = 0.005^{m}, P = 0.27 d
32 Lyn		32		72291	41975	08^{h} 33^{m} 21.84^{s}	+36° 26′ 11.1″	6.20	3.34	122	F5Vbwvar	
HD 76944				76944	44231	09^{h} 00^{m} 30.81^{s}	+37° 36′ 15.7″	6.21	−0.85	842	K5	
5 LMi		(5)		75332	43410	08^{h} 50^{m} 32.27^{s}	+33° 17′ 06.9″	6.22	3.93	94	F7Vn	
HD 64491			DD	64491	38723	07^{h} 55^{m} 40.87^{s}	+35° 24′ 45.9″	6.23	2.32	197	A3p	δ Sct variable
HD 71952				71952	41894	08^{h} 32^{m} 33.44^{s}	+53° 06′ 54.1″	6.23	2.34	196	K0IV	suspected variable
25 Lyn		25		64106	38623	07^{h} 54^{m} 29.28^{s}	+47° 23′ 09.5″	6.25	−0.13	615	K2III:	
HD 67370				67370	39938	08^{h} 09^{m} 23.06^{s}	+42° 25′ 50.8″	6.26	−0.11	613	K3III:	
HD 69149				69149	40677	08^{h} 18^{m} 15.81^{s}	+54° 08′ 37.6″	6.26	−1.31	1065	K5	suspected variable
HD 47979				47979	32261	06^{h} 44^{m} 11.48^{s}	+53° 17′ 47.1″	6.28	1.89	246	K0	
HD 71148				71148	41484	08^{h} 27^{m} 36.80^{s}	+45° 39′ 13.8″	6.32	4.63	71	G5V	suspected variable
HD 60654				60654	37091	07^{h} 37^{m} 17.81^{s}	+40° 01′ 31.8″	6.34	−0.12	639	M1	
HD 65801				65801	39279	08^{h} 01^{m} 55.20^{s}	+35° 24′ 47.1″	6.34	−0.18	657	K0	
28 Lyn		28		66824	39722	08^{h} 07^{m} 09.95^{s}	+43° 15′ 37.6″	6.35	0.54	472	A1V	
HD 63586				63586	38449	07^{h} 52^{m} 36.45^{s}	+55° 12′ 34.4″	6.36	0.81	440	A0Vn	
HD 64958				64958	38959	07^{h} 58^{m} 16.53^{s}	+43° 58′ 38.5″	6.36	0.36	517	K0	
HD 52860				52860	34168	07^{h} 05^{m} 08.99^{s}	+47° 46′ 30.2″	6.37	−1.77	1381	B9IIIn	
CC Lyn			CC	60335	36965	07^{h} 35^{m} 56.00^{s}	+43° 01′ 51.9″	6.37	0.96	393	F0	δ Sct variable
HD 77093				77093	44331	09^{h} 01^{m} 40.79^{s}	+39° 42′ 49.3″	6.39	2.30	214	A9Vn	
HD 52708				52708	34250	07^{h} 06^{m} 01.21^{s}	+59° 48′ 06.7″	6.40	1.25	349	G8III:	
HD 59826				59826	36740	07^{h} 33^{m} 24.83^{s}	+37° 11′ 16.4″	6.40	0.35	529	K0	
HD 58681				58681	36351	07^{h} 28^{m} 52.66^{s}	+46° 18′ 53.2″	6.42	1.35	337	K0	
HD 59721				59721	36779	07^{h} 33^{m} 51.53^{s}	+51° 18′ 51.1″	6.44	−0.70	874	K0	
7 Lyn		7	BQ	46101	31359	06^{h} 34^{m} 32.80^{s}	+55° 21′ 10.9″	6.45	−1.94	1552	K0III:	semiregular variable
HD 44061				44061	30357	06^{h} 23^{m} 06.37^{s}	+56° 58′ 35.5″	6.47	0.73	458	K1III	
HD 67539				67539	40086	08^{h} 11^{m} 18.03^{s}	+54° 32′ 25.7″	6.48	0.32	555	G5	
54 Cam		(54)	AE	65626	39348	08^{h} 02^{m} 35.82^{s}	+57° 16′ 25.6″	6.49	1.45	331	F8V	RS CVn variable, ΔV = 0.06^{m}
HD 63588				63588	38349	07^{h} 51^{m} 15.34^{s}	+37° 04′ 55.8″	6.49	1.08	393	K2	
HD 63630				63630	38403	07^{h} 52^{m} 03.89^{s}	+45° 55′ 59.2″	6.50	1.41	340	A3	
HD 65392				65392	39094	07^{h} 59^{m} 51.39^{s}	+36° 04′ 55.5″	6.50	−0.48	813	K5	
HD 69682				69682	40878	08^{h} 20^{m} 29.16^{s}	+53° 34′ 27.7″	6.50	2.51	205	F0IV	γ Dor variable, ΔV = 0.006^{m}, P = 0.48 d
17 Lyn		17		53633	34572	07^{h} 09^{m} 37.78^{s}	+60° 47′ 31.9″	6.64	1.05	428	K0	
52 Cam		(52)		64347	38800	07^{h} 56^{m} 26.71^{s}	+56° 30′ 16.0″	6.72	−0.58	939	A2IV	
HD 71866			TZ	71866	41782	08^{h} 31^{m} 10.64^{s}	+40° 13′ 29.6″	6.72		434	A0pv	α^{2} CVn variable, V_{max} = 6.65^{m}, V_{min} = 6.79^{m}, P = 6.80 d
46 Cam		(46)		56243	35517	07^{h} 19^{m} 52.83^{s}	+59° 15′ 10.3″	6.73	−1.99	1810	K2	
HD 82780			DI	82780	47053	09^{h} 35^{m} 22.50^{s}	+39° 57′ 47.8″	6.79		278	A3m	Algol variable, V_{max} = 6.79^{m}, V_{min} = 6.87^{m}, P = 1.68 d
19 Lyn		19		57102	35783	07^{h} 22^{m} 50.85^{s}	+55° 17′ 03.8″	6.86	1.62	365	B9V	
Y Lyn			Y	58521	36288	07^{h} 28^{m} 11.62^{s}	+45° 59′ 26.2″	6.98		825	M6S	semiregular variable, V_{max} = 6.58^{m}, V_{min} = 8.25^{m}, P = 110 d
3 Lyn		3		43749	30278	06^{h} 22^{m} 08.10^{s}	+61° 45′ 37.0″	7.20	3.25	201	F0	
48 Cam		(48)		60844	37346	07^{h} 39^{m} 58.60^{s}	+59° 33′ 47.9″	7.23	0.04	896	A2	
R Lyn			R	51610	33824	07^{h} 01^{m} 18.01^{s}	+55° 19′ 49.8″	7.56			S4-6.5/5-6e	Mira variable, V_{max} = 7.2^{m}, V_{min} = 14.3^{m}, P = 365.5 d
44 Cam		(44)		55944	35398	07^{h} 16^{m} 36.23^{s}	+58° 55′ 07.4″	7.57	2.66	312	F0	
45 Cam		(45)		56099	35457	07^{h} 19^{m} 12.18^{s}	+59° 07′ 32.5″	7.62	2.93	282	F8	
HD 80715			BF	80715	45963	09^{h} 22^{m} 25.95^{s}	+40° 12′ 03.8″	7.72		81	K2.5Vke	BY Dra variable, ΔV = 0.1^{m}
20 Lyn		20		57067	35726	07^{h} 22^{m} 13.63^{s}	+50° 08′ 52.1″	7.72			F0	
Stribor				75898	43674	08^{h} 53^{m} 50.81^{s}	+33° 03′ 24.5″	8.04	3.51	263	G0	Stribor, has a planet (b)
T Lyn			T		41058	08^{h} 22^{m} 42.85^{s}	+33° 31′ 09.5″	8.80		879	C5,2e-C71e	Mira variable, V_{max} = 8.8^{m}, V_{min} = 13.5^{m}, P = 406 d
BE Lyn			BE	79889	45649	09^{h} 18^{m} 17.18^{s}	+46° 09′ 11.3″	8.80			A3	δ Sct variable, V_{max} = 8.57^{m}, V_{min} = 8.97^{m}, P = 0.10 d
SZ Lyn			SZ	67390	39960	08^{h} 09^{m} 35.75^{s}	+44° 28′ 17.6″	9.08		3260	F2	δ Sct variable, V_{max} = 9.08^{m}, V_{min} = 9.72^{m}, P = 0.12 d
TT Lyn			TT		44428	09^{h} 03^{m} 07.79^{s}	+44° 35′ 08.1″	9.51			A9.2	RR Lyr variable, V_{max} = 9.42^{m}, V_{min} = 10.21^{m}, P = 0.60 d
UV Lyn			UV		44455	09^{h} 03^{m} 24.12^{s}	+38° 05′ 54.6″	9.56		389	G0	W UMa variable, V_{max} = 9.42^{m}, V_{min} = 9.81^{m}, P = 0.41 d
SW Lyn			SW	67008	39771	08^{h} 07^{m} 41.57^{s}	+41° 48′ 01.7″	9.65		1220	F1V	Algol variable, V_{max} = 9.51^{m}, V_{min} = 10.2^{m}, P = 0.64 d
Gloas						09^{h} 20^{m} 25.0^{s}	+33° 52′ 57″	10.42		509	G1V	Gloas, has a transiting planet (b)
AN Lyn			AN			09^{h} 14^{m} 28.69^{s}	+42° 46′ 38.2″	10.58			A7IV/V	δ Sct variable, V_{max} = 10.58^{m}, V_{min} = 10.79^{m}, P = 0.09 d
Koit						07^{h} 21^{m} 33^{s}	+58° 16′ 05″	10.70	3.37	956	F5V	Koit, has a transiting planet (b)
IRC +60169			AP			06^{h} 34^{m} 33.92^{s}	+60° 56′ 26.2″	10.9			M9	Mira variable, V_{max} = 10.9^{m}, V_{min} = 14.7^{m}
14 Lyn B		14		49619		06^{h} 53^{m} 36.00^{s}	+59° 24′ 25.0″	11.10				component of 14 Lyn system
XO-2						07^{h} 48^{m} 07^{s}	+50° 13′ 33″	11.18	5.31	486	K0V	has a transiting planet (b)
U Lyn			U			06^{h} 40^{m} 46.49^{s}	+59° 52′ 01.6″	11.52			M7e	Mira variable, V_{max} = 8.8^{m}, V_{min} = 15^{m}, P = 433.6 d
TV Lyn			TV		36750	07^{h} 33^{m} 31.73^{s}	+47° 48′ 09.8″	11.54			A6	RR Lyr variable, V_{max} = 11.24^{m}, V_{min} = 11.66^{m}, P = 0.24 d
UU Lyn			UU			09^{h} 15^{m} 31.00^{s}	+42° 42′ 12.0″	11.54			A4	β Lyr variable, V_{max} = 11.54^{m}, V_{min} = 12.33^{m}, P = 0.47 d
Absolutno						07^{h} 46^{m} 52^{s}	+39° 05′ 41″	12.13	4.97	881	G8V	Absolutno, has a transiting planet (b)
BK Lyn			BK			09^{h} 20^{m} 11.20^{s}	+33° 56′ 42.3″	14.49			CV	ER UMa variable, V_{max} = 14.3^{m}, V_{min} = 16.5^{m}
BH Lyn			BH			08^{h} 22^{m} 36.05^{s}	+51° 05′ 24.6″				CV	PG 0818+513, nova-like star and eclipsing binary
PG 0859+415			BP			09^{h} 03^{m} 08.89^{s}	+41° 17′ 47.7″				CV	eclipsing binary and nova-like star
HS 0702+6043			DW			07^{h} 07^{m} 09.81^{s}	+60° 38′ 50.1″				sdB	prototype DW Lyn variable
Table legend: • Name = Proper name • B = Bayer designation • F or/and G. = Flamsteed designation or Gould designation • Var = Variable-star designation • HD = Henry Draper Catalogue designation number • HIP = Hipparcos Catalogue designation number • RA = Right ascension for the Epoch/Equinox J2000.0 • Dec = Declination for the Epoch/Equinox J2000.0 • vis. mag. = visual magnitude (m or m_{v}), also known as apparent magnitude • abs. mag. = absolute magnitude (M_{v}) • Dist. (ly) = Distance in light-years from Earth • Sp. class = Spectral class of the star in the stellar classification system • Notes = Common name(s) or alternate name(s); comments; notable properties [for example: multiple star status, range of variability if it is a variable star, exoplanets, etc.]

== See also ==
- List of stars by constellation
