= Lynx in Chinese astronomy =

The modern constellation Lynx lies across two of the quadrants symbolized by the White Tiger of the West (西方白虎, Xī Fāng Bái Hǔ) and Vermilion Bird of the South (南方朱雀, Nán Fāng Zhū Què), that divide the sky in traditional Chinese uranography.

The name of the western constellation in modern Chinese is 天貓座 (tiān māo zuò), meaning "the celestial cat constellation".

== Stars ==
The map of Chinese constellation in constellation Lynx area consists of :

Four Symbols	Mansion (Chinese name)	Romanization	Translation	Asterisms (Chinese name)	Romanization	Translation	Western star name	Proper Name	Chinese star name	Romanization	Translation
Three Enclosures (三垣)	紫微垣	Zǐ Wēi Yuán	Purple Forbidden enclosure	內階	Nèijiē	Inner Steps					
Three Enclosures (三垣)	紫微垣	Zǐ Wēi Yuán	Purple Forbidden enclosure	內階	Nèijiē	Inner Steps	19 Lyn		內階增一	Nèijiēzēngyī	1st additional star
Three Enclosures (三垣)	紫微垣	Zǐ Wēi Yuán	Purple Forbidden enclosure	內階	Nèijiē	Inner Steps	18 Lyn		內階增二	Nèijiēzēngèr	2nd additional star
Three Enclosures (三垣)	紫微垣	Zǐ Wēi Yuán	Purple Forbidden enclosure	內階	Nèijiē	Inner Steps	24 Lyn		內階增三	Nèijiēzēngsān	3rd additional star
Three Enclosures (三垣)	紫微垣	Zǐ Wēi Yuán	Purple Forbidden enclosure	內階	Nèijiē	Inner Steps	30 Lyn		內階增四	Nèijiēzēngsì	4th additional star
Three Enclosures (三垣)	紫微垣	Zǐ Wēi Yuán	Purple Forbidden enclosure	內階	Nèijiē	Inner Steps	29 Lyn		內階增五	Nèijiēzēngwǔ	5th additional star
Three Enclosures (三垣)	紫微垣	Zǐ Wēi Yuán	Purple Forbidden enclosure	八穀	Bāgǔ	Eight Kinds of Crops					
Three Enclosures (三垣)	紫微垣	Zǐ Wēi Yuán	Purple Forbidden enclosure	八穀	Bāgǔ	Eight Kinds of Crops	1 Lyn		八穀增二十一	Bāgǔzēngèrshíyī	21st additional star
Three Enclosures (三垣)	紫微垣	Zǐ Wēi Yuán	Purple Forbidden enclosure	八穀	Bāgǔ	Eight Kinds of Crops	3 Lyn		八穀增二十二	Bāgǔzēngèrshíèr	22nd additional star
Three Enclosures (三垣)	紫微垣	Zǐ Wēi Yuán	Purple Forbidden enclosure	八穀	Bāgǔ	Eight Kinds of Crops	8 Lyn		八穀增二十三	Bāgǔzēngèrshísān	23rd additional star
Three Enclosures (三垣)	紫微垣	Zǐ Wēi Yuán	Purple Forbidden enclosure	八穀	Bāgǔ	Eight Kinds of Crops	10 Lyn		八穀增二十四	Bāgǔzēngèrshísì	24th additional star
Three Enclosures (三垣)	紫微垣	Zǐ Wēi Yuán	Purple Forbidden enclosure	八穀	Bāgǔ	Eight Kinds of Crops	4 Lyn		八穀增二十五	Bāgǔzēngèrshíwǔ	25th additional star
Three Enclosures (三垣)	紫微垣	Zǐ Wēi Yuán	Purple Forbidden enclosure	八穀	Bāgǔ	Eight Kinds of Crops	2 Lyn		八穀增二十六	Bāgǔzēngèrshíliù	26th additional star
Three Enclosures (三垣)	紫微垣	Zǐ Wēi Yuán	Purple Forbidden enclosure	八穀	Bāgǔ	Eight Kinds of Crops	5 Lyn		八穀增二十七	Bāgǔzēngèrshíqī	27th additional star
Three Enclosures (三垣)	紫微垣	Zǐ Wēi Yuán	Purple Forbidden enclosure	八穀	Bāgǔ	Eight Kinds of Crops	6 Lyn		八穀增二十八	Bāgǔzēngèrshíbā	28th additional star
Three Enclosures (三垣)	紫微垣	Zǐ Wēi Yuán	Purple Forbidden enclosure	八穀	Bāgǔ	Eight Kinds of Crops	14 Lyn		八穀增二十九	Bāgǔzēngèrshíjiǔ	29th additional star
Three Enclosures (三垣)	紫微垣	Zǐ Wēi Yuán	Purple Forbidden enclosure	八穀	Bāgǔ	Eight Kinds of Crops	15 Lyn		八穀增三十	Bāgǔzēngsānshí	30th additional star
Three Enclosures (三垣)	紫微垣	Zǐ Wēi Yuán	Purple Forbidden enclosure	八穀	Bāgǔ	Eight Kinds of Crops	13 Lyn		八穀增三十一	Bāgǔzēngsānshíyī	31st additional star
Three Enclosures (三垣)	紫微垣	Zǐ Wēi Yuán	Purple Forbidden enclosure	八穀	Bāgǔ	Eight Kinds of Crops	11 Lyn		八穀增三十二	Bāgǔzēngsānshíèr	32nd additional star
Three Enclosures (三垣)	紫微垣	Zǐ Wēi Yuán	Purple Forbidden enclosure	八穀	Bāgǔ	Eight Kinds of Crops	9 Lyn		八穀增三十三	Bāgǔzēngsānshísān	33rd additional star
Three Enclosures (三垣)	太微垣	Tài Wēi Yuán	Supreme Palace enclosure	三台	Sāntái	Three Steps					
Three Enclosures (三垣)	太微垣	Tài Wēi Yuán	Supreme Palace enclosure	三台	Sāntái	Three Steps	27 Lyn		上台增一	Shàngtáizēngyī	1st additional star of Upper Step
Three Enclosures (三垣)	太微垣	Tài Wēi Yuán	Supreme Palace enclosure	三台	Sāntái	Three Steps	26 Lyn		上台增二	Shàngtáizēngèr	2nd additional star of Upper Step
Three Enclosures (三垣)	太微垣	Tài Wēi Yuán	Supreme Palace enclosure	三台	Sāntái	Three Steps	25 Lyn		上台增三	Shàngtáizēngsān	3rd additional star of Upper Step
Three Enclosures (三垣)	太微垣	Tài Wēi Yuán	Supreme Palace enclosure	三台	Sāntái	Three Steps	31 Lyn	Alschiaukat	上台增四	Shàngtáizēngsì	4th additional star of Upper Step
Three Enclosures (三垣)	太微垣	Tài Wēi Yuán	Supreme Palace enclosure	三台	Sāntái	Three Steps	35 Lyn		上台增五	Shàngtáizēngwǔ	5th additional star of Upper Step
Three Enclosures (三垣)	太微垣	Tài Wēi Yuán	Supreme Palace enclosure	三台	Sāntái	Three Steps	36 Lyn		上台增六	Shàngtáizēngliù	6th additional star of Upper Step
White Tiger of the West (西方白虎)	觜	Zī	Turtle Beak	座旗	Zuòqí	Seat Flags					
White Tiger of the West (西方白虎)	觜	Zī	Turtle Beak	座旗	Zuòqí	Seat Flags	16 Lyn		座旗二	Zuòqíèr	2nd star
White Tiger of the West (西方白虎)	觜	Zī	Turtle Beak	座旗	Zuòqí	Seat Flags	21 Lyn		座旗增九	Zuòqízēngjiǔ	9th additional star
White Tiger of the West (西方白虎)	觜	Zī	Turtle Beak	座旗	Zuòqí	Seat Flags	22 Lyn		座旗增十	Zuòqízēngshí	10th additional star
White Tiger of the West (西方白虎)	觜	Zī	Turtle Beak	座旗	Zuòqí	Seat Flags	20 Lyn		座旗增十一	Zuòqízēngshíyī	11th additional star
Vermilion Bird of the South (南方朱雀)	柳	Xīng	Star	軒轅	Xuānyuán	Xuanyuan					
Vermilion Bird of the South (南方朱雀)	柳	Xīng	Star	軒轅	Xuānyuán	Xuanyuan	10 UMa		軒轅一	Xuanyuanyī	1st star
Vermilion Bird of the South (南方朱雀)	柳	Xīng	Star	軒轅	Xuānyuán	Xuanyuan	HD 77912		軒轅二	Xuanyuanèr	2nd star
Vermilion Bird of the South (南方朱雀)	柳	Xīng	Star	軒轅	Xuānyuán	Xuanyuan	38 Lyn		軒轅三	Xuanyuansān	3rd star
Vermilion Bird of the South (南方朱雀)	柳	Xīng	Star	軒轅	Xuānyuán	Xuanyuan	α Lyn		軒轅四	Xuanyuansì	4th star
Vermilion Bird of the South (南方朱雀)	柳	Xīng	Star	軒轅	Xuānyuán	Xuanyuan	HD 79452		軒轅增三	Xuanyuanzēngsān	3rd additional star
Vermilion Bird of the South (南方朱雀)	柳	Xīng	Star	軒轅	Xuānyuán	Xuanyuan	33 Lyn		軒轅增八	Xuanyuanzēngbā	8th additional star
Vermilion Bird of the South (南方朱雀)	柳	Xīng	Star	內平	Nèipíng	High Judge					
Vermilion Bird of the South (南方朱雀)	柳	Xīng	Star	內平	Nèipíng	High Judge	43 Lyn		内平增三	Nèipíngzēngsān	3rd additional star
Vermilion Bird of the South (南方朱雀)	柳	Xīng	Star	內平	Nèipíng	High Judge	42 Lyn		内平增四	Nèipíngzēngsì	4th additional star

== See also ==
- Traditional Chinese star names
- Chinese constellations
