= HD 129132 =

Triple star system in the constellation Boötes

Observation data Epoch J2000.0 Equinox J2000.0
- Constellation: Boötes
- Right ascension: 14^{h} 40^{m} 21.86915^{s}
- Declination: +21° 58′ 33.1217″
- Apparent magnitude (V): 6.13

Characteristics
- Spectral type: G0V or F4III
- B−V color index: 0.434±0.004

Astrometry
Radial velocity (R_{v})	+1.667±0.0024 km/s
Proper motion (μ)	RA: +15.157 mas/yr Dec.: −39.067 mas/yr
Parallax (π)	10.0986±0.1285 mas
Distance	323 ± 4 ly (99 ± 1 pc)
Absolute magnitude (M_{V})	0.82

Orbit
Primary	Aa1
Companion	Aa2
Period (P)	101.606±0.003 d
Semi-major axis (a)	≥26.4±0.2 Gm
Eccentricity (e)	0.117±0.007
Periastron epoch (T)	2,442,478.0±0.8 HJD
Semi-amplitude (K_{1}) (primary)	19.0±0.1 km/s

Orbit
Primary	Aa
Companion	Ab
Period (P)	3,385±7 d
Semi-major axis (a)	0.074±0.001" (407±6 Gm)
Eccentricity (e)	0.073±0.010
Inclination (i)	104.6±0.5°
Periastron epoch (T)	2,442,880±40 HJD
Argument of periastron (ω) (secondary)	91.4±4.1°
Semi-amplitude (K_{1}) (primary)	8.5±0.1 km/s

Details

Aa1
Mass	1.99 M_{☉}
Radius	17.0+1.7 −1.6 R_{☉}
Luminosity	236.1+5.9 −5.7 L_{☉}
Surface gravity (log g)	3.41 cgs
Temperature	5,488+275 −258 K
Rotational velocity (v sin i)	25.3 km/s
Age	1.00 Gyr

Aa2
Mass	1.29 M_{☉}

Ab
Mass	1.82 M_{☉}

Other designations
- BD+22°2731, HD 129132, HIP 71729, HR 5472, SAO 83458, WDS J14404+2159AB, GSC 01483-00948

Database references
SIMBAD	data

HD 129132 is a triple star system in the northern constellation of Boötes. It is dimly visible to the naked eye with a combined apparent visual magnitude of 6.13. The distance to this system is approximately 382 light years based on parallax, and it is drifting further away from the Sun with a radial velocity of +1.7 km/s.

This system was found to be a spectroscopic binary by the Dominion Astrophysical Observatory in 1923. It was then shown to be a triple star system in 1937 by William E. Harper and Guy H. Blanchet. The inner pair have an orbital period of 101.6 days and an eccentricity of 0.117, with the primary forming the visible component of this pair. The third component forms a visual system with the inner pair, orbiting with a period of 9.27 years and an eccentricity of 0.073.

The primary component appears to be an aging giant star with a stellar classification of F4III, although it has also been classed as a G-type main-sequence star of type G0V. It is around a billion years old with twice the mass of the Sun. The star has expanded to 17 times the Sun's radius and is radiating 236 times the luminosity of the Sun at an effective temperature of 5,488 K. It is spinning with a projected rotational velocity of 25.3 km/s.
