= VV Ursae Majoris =

Variable star system in the constellation Ursa Major

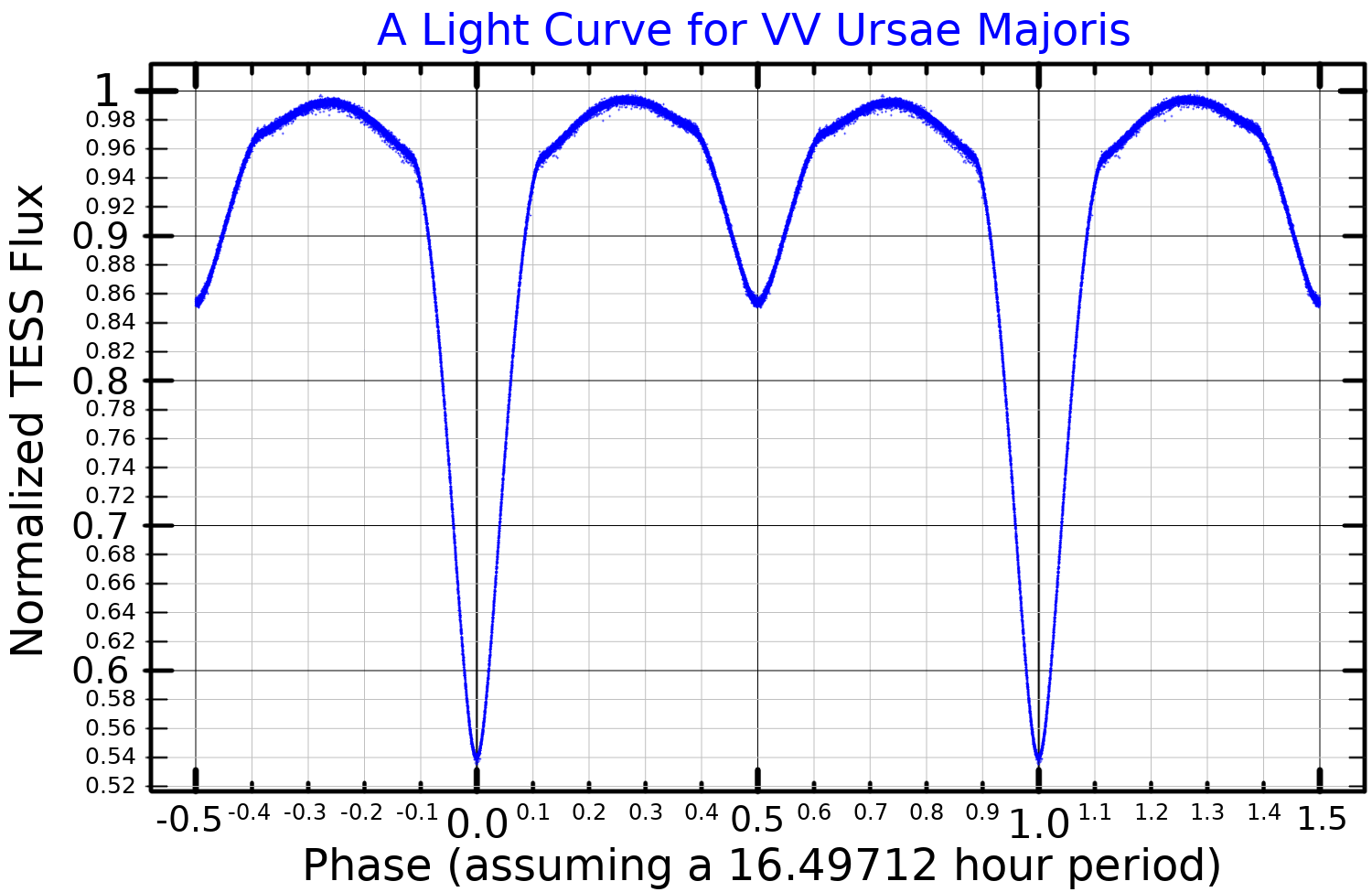
- A light curve for VV Ursae Majoris, plotted from TESS data

Observation data Epoch J2000 Equinox ICRS
- Constellation: Ursa Major
- Right ascension: 09^{h} 38^{m} 06.719^{s}
- Declination: +56° 01′ 07.29″
- Apparent magnitude (V): 10.19

Characteristics
- Spectral type: A1.5–2V + G5IV
- Variable type: Semidetached Algol

Astrometry
| Proper motion (μ) | RA: −18.536 mas/yr Dec.: 3.254 mas/yr |
| Parallax (π) | 2.177±0.0394 mas |
| Distance | 1,500 ± 30 ly (459 ± 8 pc) |
| Absolute magnitude (M_{V}) | 1.87 |

Orbit
| Period (P) | 0.68735545 d |
| Semi-major axis (a) | 3.54" (4.87 R_{☉}) |
| Eccentricity (e) | 0.0 |
| Inclination (i) | 82.07±0.3° |
| Periastron epoch (T) | 2,428,925.637 JD |
| Semi-amplitude (K_{1}) (primary) | 59.6 km/s |

Details

Primary
| Mass | 0.97 M_{☉} |
| Radius | 1.35 R_{☉} |
| Luminosity | 11.2 L_{☉} |
| Surface gravity (log g) | 4.37 cgs |
| Temperature | 9,090 K |

Secondary
| Mass | 0.29 M_{☉} |
| Radius | 0.96 R_{☉} |
| Luminosity | 0.42 L_{☉} |
| Surface gravity (log g) | 4.00 cgs |
| Temperature | 4,740 K |

Other designations
- VV UMa, BD+56°1395, HIP 47279, GCRV 6211

Database references
| SIMBAD | data |

VV Ursae Majoris is a binary star system in the northern circumpolar constellation of Ursa Major, abbreviated VV UMa. It is a variable star system with a brightness that cycles around an apparent visual magnitude of 10.19, making it too faint to be visible to the naked eye. The system is located at a distance of approximately 1,500 light years based on parallax measurements.

This star was found to be variable by H. K. Gitz in 1936 based on photographic plates taken in Moscow, then S. Kaho published an ephemeris in 1939 using observed minima. In 1950, O. Struve computed the orbital elements for a single-lined spectroscopic binary system with a short orbital period of just 17 hours. He found a stellar classification of A0V for the primary component. P. Broglia and P. Conconi analyzed the light curve of the system in 1977, and determined this to be a semidetached binary with the secondary component being significantly less massive than the primary. In 1996, V. Simon found a periodic variation in the system minima with a cycle length of 22 years. He proposed that this variation is being driven by a third component in the system.

This is an eclipsing binary; a semi-detached Algol-type system. The best fit spectral type for the primary component is A1.5–2V, matching an A-type main-sequence star. The secondary is a cooler, overluminous, late G-type star; it is a slightly evolved subgiant star that is filling its Roche lobe. The system displays an intrinsic low amplitude variability, which is probably coming from the primary. Multiple pulsation periods have been detected. There is no evidence of an infrared excess.

The light-travel time effect provides information about the properties of the purported third component in the system. It has 0.787 times the mass of the Sun and is orbiting at a distance of 10.75 AU from the inner pair with an eccentricity of 0.35 and a period of 23.22±0.17 years.
