= BE Lyncis =

Delta Scuti variable star in the constellation Lynx

Observation data Epoch J2000.0 Equinox ICRS
- Constellation: Lynx
- Right ascension: 09^{h} 18^{m} 17.180^{s}
- Declination: +46° 09′ 11.31″
- Apparent magnitude (V): 8.53–8.97

Characteristics
- Evolutionary stage: Post-main sequence
- Spectral type: A3
- B−V color index: 0.240±0.015
- Variable type: high-amplitude δ Sct

Astrometry
Radial velocity (R_{v})	+3.906±0.067 km/s
Proper motion (μ)	RA: +7.950 mas/yr Dec.: +0.753 mas/yr
Parallax (π)	3.9741±0.0237 mas
Distance	821 ± 5 ly (252 ± 2 pc)

Details
Mass	1.61 M_{☉}
Radius	2.44 R_{☉}
Luminosity	24.6 L_{☉}
Surface gravity (log g)	3.870 cgs
Temperature	8,220 K
Metallicity [Fe/H]	−0.26±0.08 dex
Rotational velocity (v sin i)	10 km/s
Age	1.44 Gyr

Other designations
- BE Lyn, BD+46°1490, HD 79889, HIP 45649, SAO 42793, TIC 56914404, TYC 3425-1038-1, 2MASS J09181718+4609112

Database references
SIMBAD	data

BE Lyncis is a white-hued variable star in the northern constellation of Lynx. It has the identifier HD 79889 in the Henry Draper Catalogue; BE Lyn is the variable-star designation. With an apparent magnitude varying between 8.53 and 8.97, it is too faint to be seen by the naked eye but can be observed with binoculars. It is located at a distance of 821 light-years (252 pc) according to Gaia DR3 parallax measurements, and is moving away from the Sun at a radial velocity of 3.906 km/s.

== Observational history ==
The star was included in the Henry Draper Catalogue in 1919 as the 79,889th entry (designation HD 79889) and assigned the spectral type of A3. HD 79889's variability was first noted during regular UBV observations at the Kvistaberg Observatory in April 1985 and confirmed in October of that year. In 1987, the star was determined to be a very likely high-amplitude dwarf Cepheid with a period of 0.0958697 days (2.30 h), though the possibility it was an older SX Phoenicis variable could not be ruled out. It received the variable-star designation BE Lyn in 1989, classified as a Delta Scuti variable varying from magnitude 8.60 to 9.00. It is currently classified as a high-amplitude Delta Scuti variable (HADS), a subgroup of Delta Scuti variables with amplitudes over 0.3 magnitudes.

A gradual decrease in the star's pulsation period was reported in 1991 from the analysis of V-band observations conducted at Xinglong Station between 1988 and 1989. However, follow-up observations carried out at the same observatory in 1992 and between 1993 and 1994 instead revealed a parabolic period increase. Around this time, several period measurements yielded slightly discrepant results: Rodríguez et al. (1990) gave a value of 0.095869448(21) days, whereas Wunder et al. (1992) placed the period at 0.095869483(14) days.

=== Proposed companions ===
Multiple studies have proposed companion stars to BE Lyncis on the basis on periodic variations in the pulsation period, which could be attributed to the light travel time effect (LTTE) of an orbiting companion.

The first ones to suggest a companion were Kiss and Szatmary, in 1995. They calculated an orbital period of 2,350 ± 100 days (6.43 ± 0.27 years), an eccentricity of 0.30, and a semi-major axis of 4.2±0.1 AU. The companion's mass would be between 0.05 and 0.3 solar masses, making it either a brown dwarf or a red dwarf. This claim, however, was disproven by Derekas et al. in 2003, who found that the period variations are not cyclic, as would be expected for the LTTE of an orbiting companion.

In 2006, however, Fu & Jiyang published in a conference paper that the LTTE of a companion was still a viable hypothesis to the period variations. They calculated an orbital period of 4,310 ± 510 days (11.8 ± 1.4 years) and an eccentricity of 0.48±0.30 for the companion, but did not calculate a mass. The presence of this companion was later disproven in 2008 by Szakats, Szabo and Szatmary, which found no period variation.

A 2011 study by Boonyarak et al. found that the pulsation period of BE Lyncis is decreasing at a rate of −2.49×10^{−8} per year, but states that more data is needed to unveil the cause of such variation.

In 2015, Peña et al. again proposed that the star has a companion with an orbital period of 9.513 years, based on new data again showing variations in the pulsation period.

In January 2026 a preprint was published by Niu, Zhang and Fue proposing that BE Lyncis has a black hole companion, based on a photometric analysis spanning 39 years. They calculated an orbital period of 15.9 years, a minimum semi-major axis of 1.1 AU and an orbital eccentricity of 0.9989, which would be the highest ever measured for any star system. For the star to not overflow its Roche lobe during the periastron, the orbital inclination should be less than 4°, given that the true semi-major axis must be much larger than the projected semi-major axis of 1.1 AU, which assumes 90°, to avoid the overflow. The inclination implies a mass of 17.5 M_{☉} for the unseen companion, which can only be a black hole – the closest known, given the system's distance.

This claim, however, was subsequently disproven in another January 2026 preprint by Nagarajan et al., which analysed astrometric data and cast doubt in the previous results. If such a black hole companion were there, the position of BE Lyncis would appear to bounce due to the orbital motion. As a consequence, the proper motion measurements between Hipparcos, Gaia DR2 and Gaia DR3, taken over a 25-year timespan, would be significantly discrepant with each other. However, the observed proper motion differences are much less than expected. The traditional assumption of a linear motion to the star would give a poor fit to the astrometric observations, making elements such as proper motion and parallax very uncertain and unreliable, and BE Lyncis would be classified as an astrometric binary or an "accelerating star". However, models assuming linear motion give an excellent fit to the data, and no reports of binarity or acceleration have been made. The lack of an astrometric signature made by the black hole disproves its existence. Additionally, the study also found that requirement of the star not overflowing its Roche lobe does not lead to any inclination constraint – the star would be tidally disrupted at the current orbit. They conclude that the orbit is incorrect and that the variation is either intrinsic, or caused by red noise.

An update of the Niu et al. preprint in February 2026 relaxed their inclination constraint to 10.1° based on an error noted by Nagarajan et al., implying a mass over 2.5 M_{☉}. The companion would be either a neutron star – the heaviest known – or a black hole – the nearest known. However, in the peer reviewed version of Nagarajan et al.'s paper, published in April 2026, the astrometric conclusions remain unchanged even if the companion had a mass of 2.5 M_{☉}, and BE Lyncis would still be tidally destroyed at periastron.

== Characteristics ==
The physical properties of BE Lyncis have been obtained with asteroseismology. The best-fit model gives a mass of 1.61 solar masses, a radius of 2.44 solar radii, a luminosity 24.6 times solar, an effective temperature of 8,220 K, and an age of 1.44 billion years (Gyr). This model also indicates that the star has evolved away from the main sequence. Spectroscopic measurements found that the star's iron-to-hydrogen abundance ratio is 55% that of the Sun. The star appears to be single, with no known companion.
