= SZ Lyncis =

Variable star in the constellation of Lynx

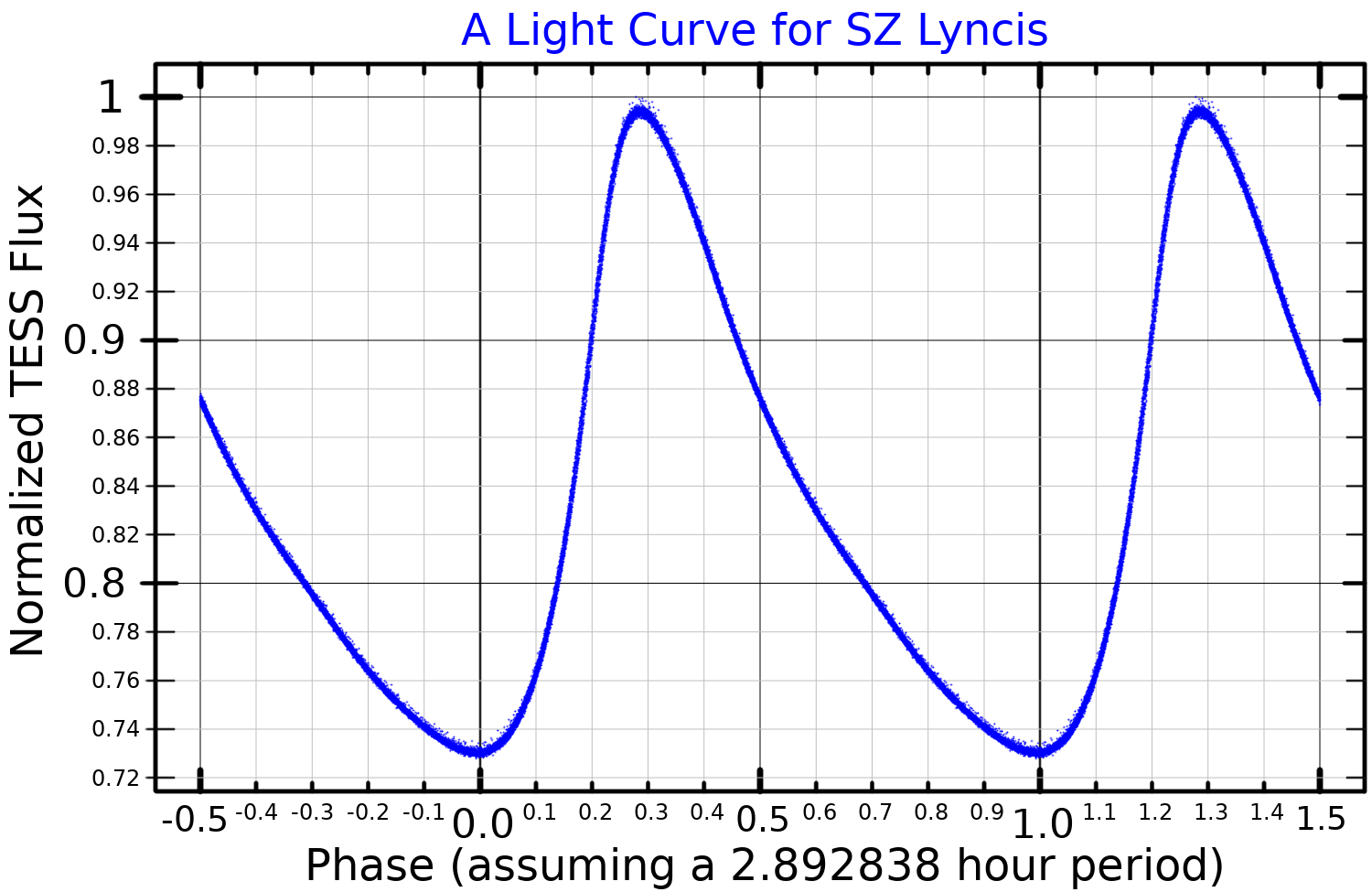
- A light curve for SZ Lyncis, plotted from TESS data

Observation data Epoch J2000 Equinox ICRS
- Constellation: Lynx
- Right ascension: 08^{h} 09^{m} 35.749^{s}
- Declination: +44° 28′ 17.60″
- Apparent magnitude (V): 9.58 (9.08 – 9.72)

Characteristics
- Spectral type: F0 IV-V + F2 V – K3 V
- B−V color index: 0.255±0.041
- Variable type: δ Sct

Astrometry
Radial velocity (R_{v})	34.17±0.04 km/s
Proper motion (μ)	RA: −12.822 mas/yr Dec.: −26.584 mas/yr
Parallax (π)	1.9104±0.1127 mas
Distance	1,700 ± 100 ly (520 ± 30 pc)

Orbit
Period (P)	1,181.1±0.8 d
Semi-major axis (a)	≥ 152.3 ± 0.8 Gm (1.0181 ± 0.0053 AU)
Eccentricity (e)	0.188±0.005
Inclination (i)	39±17.7°
Periastron epoch (T)	2,445,799.5±6.6 JD
Argument of periastron (ω) (secondary)	99.0±2.3°
Semi-amplitude (K_{1}) (primary)	9.55±0.05 km/s

Details

Primary
Mass	1.7–2.0 M_{☉}
Radius	2.68 R_{☉}
Surface gravity (log g)	3.9±0.08 cgs
Temperature	7,142±3.96 K
Metallicity [Fe/H]	0.00±0.04 dex
Rotational velocity (v sin i)	40 km/s

Other designations
- SZ Lyn, BD+44°1718, HD 67390, HIP 39960, SAO 42201

Database references
SIMBAD	data

SZ Lyncis is a binary star system in the northern constellation of Lynx, abbreviated SZ Lyn. It is a variable star with an apparent visual magnitude that fluctuates around 9.58, which is too faint to be visible to the naked eye. The distance to this system is approximately 1,700 light years based on parallax measurements, and it is drifting further away with a radial velocity of 34 km/s.

The variability of this system was announced in 1949 by C. Hoffmeister. V. Zessewitch generated a light curve from photographic observations, showing a period of 0.25 days. H. Schneller in 1961 classified it as a short-period RR Lyrae variable. O. J. Eggen in 1962 found a period of 0.12 days, or half that of earlier measurements. P. Broglia in 1963 noted that the ~0.5 magnitude amplitude variation of SZ Lyn is more consistent with a dwarf Cepheid of the AI Velorum type (later termed a Delta Scuti variable).

Comparison of the times of maximum light by A. M. van Genderen in 1967 showed a variation in the period. This followed a sine wave with a period of 1,129 days. In 1975, T. G. Barnes and T. J. Moffett confirmed the period variation and suggested it is being caused by a light-travel time effect in a single-lined spectroscopic binary with an orbital period of 3.14 years. Radial velocity measurements by C. Bardin and M. Imbert in 1984 confirmed the binary nature of this system. Updated orbital elements were published by T. J. Moffett and associates in 1988.

This is a spectroscopic binary system with an orbital period of 3.2337 ± 0.0022 years and an eccentricity (ovalness) of 0.19. A decrease in the longitude of the periapsis has been detected, which may indicate that the secondary component is actually a close binary. The primary component is a Delta Scuti variable with a main pulsation frequency of 8.296943±0.000002 cycles per day. 23 frequencies have been identified, of which 14 are multiples of the main frequency. Models of the stellar properties suggest that it is near the end of its core hydrogen burning stage, or has just begun shell burning. The secondary is likely a main sequence star with a class in the range F2 V – K3 V.
