= RR Lyncis =

Variable star in the constellation Lynx

- Location of RR Lyncis (circled)

Observation data Epoch J2000 Equinox ICRS
- Constellation: Lynx
- Right ascension: 06^{h} 26^{m} 25.837^{s}
- Declination: +56° 17′ 06.35″
- Apparent magnitude (V): 5.53

Characteristics
- Evolutionary stage: Main sequence
- Spectral type: kA3hA7VmF2 + F0 V
- B−V color index: 0.238±0.013
- Variable type: Detached Algol

Astrometry
Radial velocity (R_{v})	−12.03±0.04 km/s
Proper motion (μ)	RA: −26.232 mas/yr Dec.: +21.881 mas/yr
Parallax (π)	12.4161±0.0918 mas
Distance	263 ± 2 ly (80.5 ± 0.6 pc)
Absolute magnitude (M_{V})	1.16

Orbit
Period (P)	9.945080±0.000059 d
Semi-major axis (a)	29.32±0.04 R_{☉}
Eccentricity (e)	0.0793±0.0009
Inclination (i)	87.45±0.11°
Periastron epoch (T)	2,453,334,634±0.017 HJD
Argument of periastron (ω) (secondary)	179.4±0.6°
Semi-amplitude (K_{1}) (primary)	65.65±0.06 km/s
Semi-amplitude (K_{2}) (secondary)	83.92±0.17 km/s

Details

Primary
Mass	1.939±0.007 M_{☉}
Radius	2.564±0.019 R_{☉}
Luminosity	21.6 L_{☉}
Surface gravity (log g)	3.9078±0.0063 cgs
Temperature	7,770±200 K
Rotational velocity (v sin i)	14.6±1 km/s
Age	1.08±0.15 Gyr

Secondary
Mass	1.510±0.003 M_{☉}
Radius	1.613±0.013 R_{☉}
Luminosity	6.23 L_{☉}
Surface gravity (log g)	4.2017±0.0071 cgs
Temperature	7,180±200 K
Rotational velocity (v sin i)	11.3±2 km/s

Other designations
- RR Lyn, BD+56°1125, FK5 2491, GC 8281, HD 44691, HIP 30651, HR 2291, SAO 25731, Boss 1607, Groom 1149

Database references
SIMBAD	data

RR Lyncis is a star system in the northern constellation of Lynx, abbreviated RR Lyn. It is an eclipsing binary of the Algol type; one of the closest in the northern sky at an estimated distance of approximately 263 light years based on parallax measurements. The system is faintly visible to the naked eye with a combined apparent visual magnitude of 5.53. During the primary eclipse the brightness drops to 6.03, while it decreases to magnitude 5.90 with the secondary eclipse. The system is drifting closer to the Sun with a radial velocity of −12 km/s.

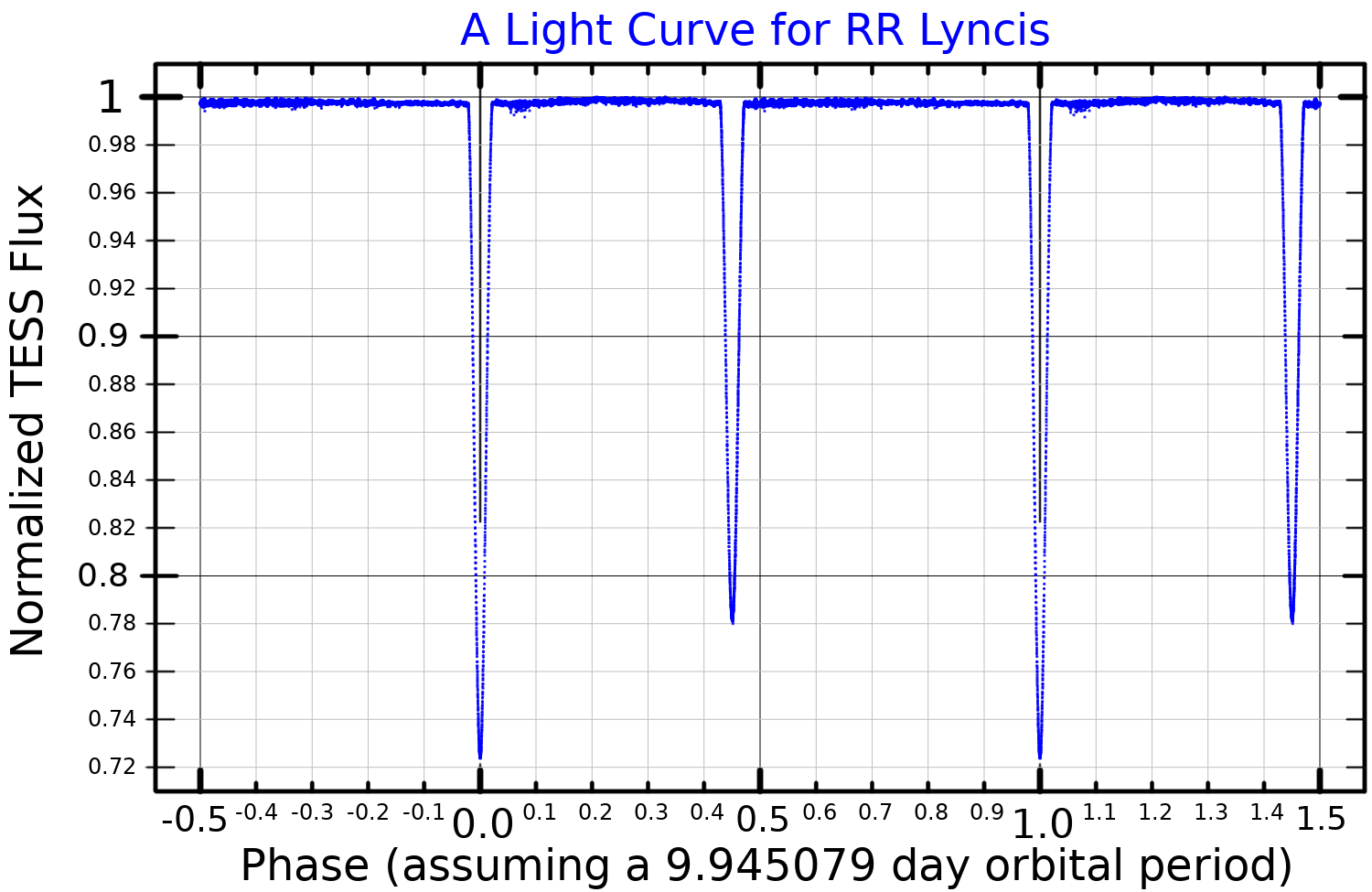
A light curve for RR Lyncis, plotted from TESS

This star was found to have a variable radial velocity by W. S. Adams, based on measurements taken in 1911, which suggested it is a spectroscopic binary system. At the time it was identified as Boss 1607 and Groom 1149. Orbital elements for the binary were first published in 1915 by W. E. Harper. In 1931, C. M. Huffer determined Boss 1607 to be an eclipsing binary, based on a light curve generated using photoelectric measurements. This showed a period of 9.9450 days with a magnitude difference of 1.20 between the components. N. G. Roman in 1949 found this to be a metallic-line star and a possible member of the Ursa Major stream.

In 1960, C. and M. Jaschek published a spectral analysis of RR Lyn that showed hydrogen lines for a star of type A7, a K-line of type A3, and metallic lines of type F0 or cooler. Kh. F. Khaliullin and A. I. Khaliullina in 2002 found that the timing of the primary and secondary eclipses underwent quasi-period oscillations. This may be explained by a third body with a mass 90% of the Sun in orbit with the pair. However, as of 2006 the presence of this object has not been confirmed through spectroscopic measurement.

This is a detached double-lined spectroscopic binary with an orbital period of 9.95 days and a small eccentricity. The orbital plane is inclined at an angle of 87.5°, so both stars are seen to eclipse each other once per orbit. The primary component is a slightly-evolved Am star with 1.9 times the mass and 2.6 times the radius of the Sun. The secondary is an F-type main-sequence star with 1.5 times the mass of the Sun and 1.6 times the Sun's radius. The system exhibits pulsation behavior, most of which is attributed to the secondary. The higher frequency modes are Delta Scuti-type pulsations, while the intermediate frequencies are of the Gamma Doradus type. Lower frequency pulsations may be tidally-excited. The system is about one billion years old.
