= SW Lyncis =

Variable star in the constellation of Lynx

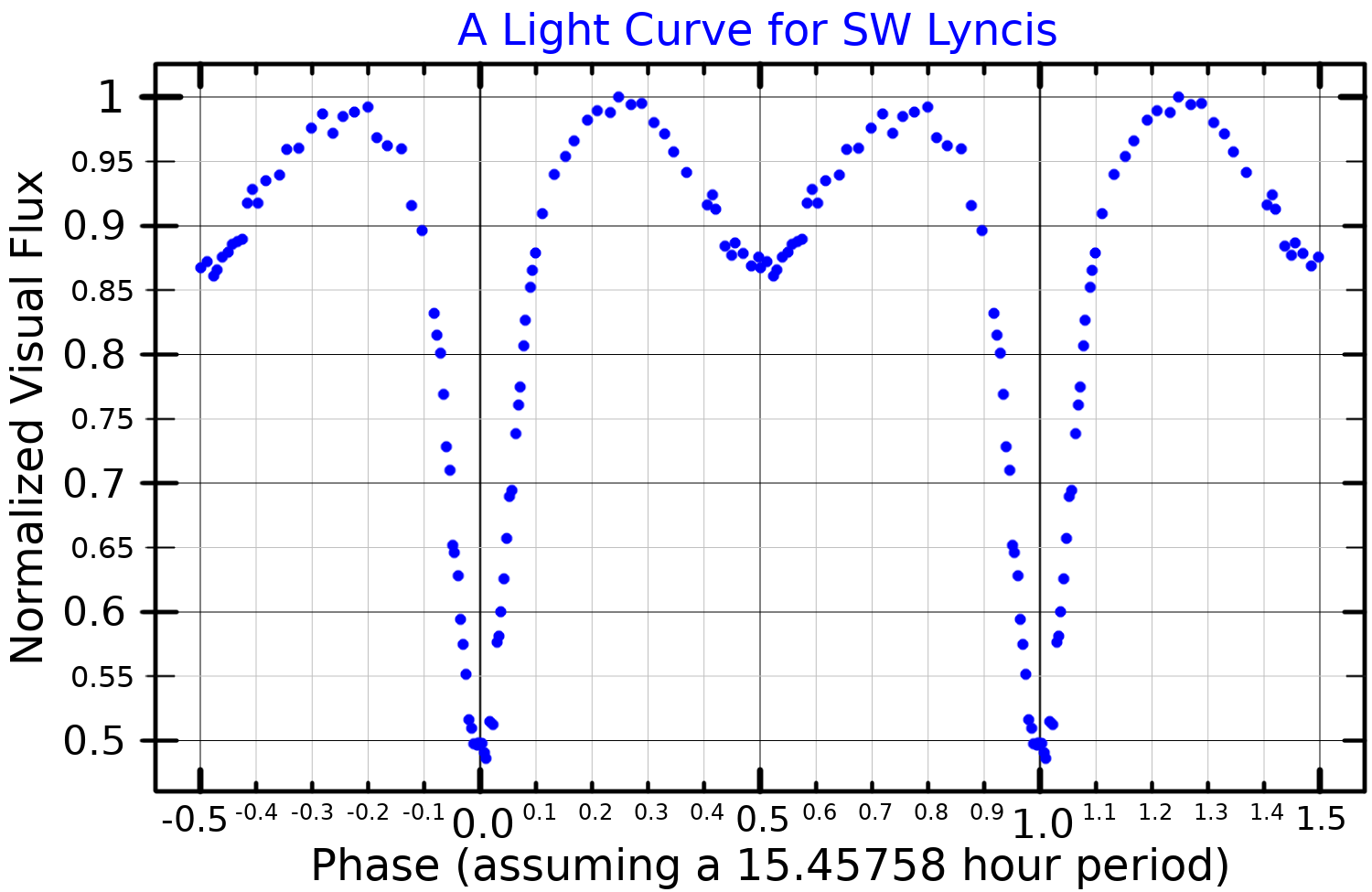
- A visual band light curve for SW Lyncis, adapted from Ogloza et al. (1998)

Observation data Epoch J2000 Equinox ICRS
- Constellation: Lynx
- Right ascension: 08^{h} 07^{m} 41.569^{s}
- Declination: +41° 48′ 01.74″
- Apparent magnitude (V): 9.58 primary eclipse: 10.20 secondary eclipse: 9.65

Characteristics
- Spectral type: F2 V
- B−V color index: 0.255±0.041
- Variable type: Detached Algol

Astrometry
Radial velocity (R_{v})	+32.39±1.35 km/s
Proper motion (μ)	RA: −16.887 mas/yr Dec.: −36.795 mas/yr
Parallax (π)	3.3655±0.0571 mas
Distance	970 ± 20 ly (297 ± 5 pc)

Orbit
Period (P)	0.644066 d
Eccentricity (e)	0.00
Periastron epoch (T)	2,451,400.1795±0.0025 HJD
Semi-amplitude (K_{1}) (primary)	116.73±1.65 km/s
Semi-amplitude (K_{2}) (secondary)	222.75±3.20 km/s

Details

Primary
Mass	1.77±0.37 M_{☉}
Radius	1.76±0.16 R_{☉}
Luminosity	10.15±0.15 L_{☉}
Temperature	7,800 K

Secondary
Mass	0.92±0.18 M_{☉}
Radius	1.32±0.12 R_{☉}
Luminosity	0.64±0.01 L_{☉}
Temperature	4,588±6 K

Other designations
- SW Lyn, BD+42°1811, HD 67008, HIP 39771, SAO 42180

Database references
SIMBAD	data

SW Lyncis is a binary or possibly a multiple-star system in the northern constellation of Lynx, abbreviated SW Lyn. With a combined apparent visual magnitude of 9.58, it is too faint to be visible to the naked eye. The system is located at a distance of approximately 970 light years based on parallax measurements, and is drifting further away with a net radial velocity of about +32 km/s.

The variable luminosity of this system was reported by R. Kippenhahn in 1955. Huth in 1958 classified it as a β Lyr-type variable. W. Strohmeier found a short period of 15.46 hours in 1959, although there was no minimum detected from a secondary eclipse. H. Mauder classified this as an eclipsing binary of the Algol type based on a light curve assembled in 1960. J. K. Gleim in 1967 noted that the period of the system had changed, suggesting that there may be a third body in the system. He considered it to be a member of the β Lyr class, although it is more closely related to the Algol type than W Ursae Majoris variables.

M. Vetešník noted in 1968 that the light curve for the system appeared noticeably asymmetric. He published orbital elements for this system in 1977 and found a stellar classification of F2V for the primary component. A low mass ratio suggested the secondary is much smaller and less luminous than the primary. L. Qingyao and associates in 1991 concluded that this is a semi-detached system with one of the components filling its Roche lobe, and thought the secondary to be over-sized and over-luminous for its mass. W. Ogłoza and associates in 1998 supported the idea of a semi-detached system, and found that the light curve suggested the presence of a third component in the system with an orbital period of 5.83 years. The third component is thought to contribute less than 1.5% of the light output of the system.

In 2010, C.-H. Kim and associates performed modelling of the 34-year cycle variations of the system and conjectured that two additional circumbinary companions are creating this effect. However, subsequent studies suggest that such a configuration would be too unstable. The system behavior remains unexplained. SW Lyn is presently classified as a near contact binary that decreases in brightness to magnitude 10.20 during the primary eclipse and to magnitude 9.65 with the secondary eclipse.
