= DU Lyncis =

Star in the constellation Lynx

Observation data Epoch J2000 Equinox ICRS
- Constellation: Lynx
- Right ascension: 07^{h} 46^{m} 39.28149^{s}
- Declination: +37° 31′ 02.6318″
- Apparent magnitude (V): 5.15

Characteristics
- Evolutionary stage: AGB
- Spectral type: M3 III
- B−V color index: 1.588±0.010
- Variable type: SRb

Astrometry
Radial velocity (R_{v})	−37.20±0.21 km/s
Proper motion (μ)	RA: +27.245 mas/yr Dec.: +12.499 mas/yr
Parallax (π)	9.2149±0.2986 mas
Distance	350 ± 10 ly (109 ± 4 pc)
Absolute magnitude (M_{V})	−0.46

Details
Luminosity	536 L_{☉}
Temperature	3,779 K

Other designations
- DU Lyn, NSV 3721, BD+37 1769, FK5 1199, HD 62647, HIP 37946, HR 2999, SAO 60328

Database references
SIMBAD	data

DU Lyncis is a single variable star in the constellation Lynx. It is a faint star but visible to the naked eye with an apparent visual magnitude of 5.15. With an annual parallax shift of 9.2 mas, it is located some 350 light years from the Sun. The star is moving closer with a heliocentric radial velocity of −37 km/s.

The star was listed as a suspected variable star, NSV 3721, in 1998. Variability was confirmed in 2001 by John R. Percy et al. It received its variable star designation, DU Lyncis, in 2003.

This is an aging red giant star with a stellar classification of M3 III, indicating that it has consumed the hydrogen at its core and evolved away from the main sequence. Eggen lists it as being on the asymptotic giant branch. It has been classified as a semiregular variable of type SRb, ranging from magnitude 5.18 down to 5.31 with periods of 360 and possibly 22 days. It shines with a luminosity approximately 536 times that of the Sun and has an effective temperature of 3,779 K.
