= HD 82741 =

Star in the constellation Lynx

- Location of HD 82741 (circled in red)

Observation data Epoch J2000 Equinox J2000
- Constellation: Lynx
- Right ascension: 09^{h} 35^{m} 03.83005^{s}
- Declination: +39° 37′ 17.3743″
- Apparent magnitude (V): 4.81

Characteristics
- Evolutionary stage: red clump
- Spectral type: G9.5 IIIb Fe-1
- B−V color index: 0.980

Astrometry
Radial velocity (R_{v})	0.992±0.002 km/s
Proper motion (μ)	RA: −30.124 mas/yr Dec.: +20.155 mas/yr
Parallax (π)	14.6281±0.2230 mas
Distance	223 ± 3 ly (68 ± 1 pc)
Absolute magnitude (M_{V})	0.573

Details
Mass	1.62 M_{☉}
Radius	8.78±0.61 R_{☉}
Luminosity	58.9 L_{☉}
Surface gravity (log g)	2.6 cgs
Temperature	4,809±51 K
Metallicity [Fe/H]	−0.18 dex
Rotational velocity (v sin i)	1.0 km/s
Age	2.74 Gyr

Other designations
- BD+40°2224, FK5 2762, HD 82741, HIP 47029, HR 3809, SAO 61578

Database references
SIMBAD	data

HD 82741 is a single star in the northern constellation of Lynx. It is visible to the naked eye with an apparent visual magnitude of 4.81. The distance to HD 82741 is 223 light years, as determined from its annual parallax shift of 14.6 mas. It is moving further from the Earth with a heliocentric radial velocity of 1 km/s.

At the age of 2.74 billion years, this is an evolved giant star with a stellar classification of G9.5 IIIb Fe-1, where the suffix notation indicates an underabundance of iron in its atmosphere. It belongs to a sub-category of giants called the red clump, indicating that it is on the horizontal branch and is generating energy through the fusion of helium at its core. With 1.62 times the mass of the Sun, it has expanded to 9 times the Sun's radius. It is radiating 58.9 times the Sun's luminosity from its enlarged photosphere at an effective temperature of 4,809 K.
