= 27 Lyncis =

Star in the constellation Lynx

- Location of 27 Lyncis (circled in red)

Observation data Epoch J2000 Equinox ICRS
- Constellation: Lynx
- Right ascension: 08^{h} 08^{m} 27.44632^{s}
- Declination: +51° 30′ 24.0055″
- Apparent magnitude (V): 4.78

Characteristics
- Evolutionary stage: main sequence
- Spectral type: A2 V
- B−V color index: 0.048±0.006

Astrometry
Radial velocity (R_{v})	+11.0±4.2 km/s
Proper motion (μ)	RA: −60.95 mas/yr Dec.: −3.11 mas/yr
Parallax (π)	13.04±0.31 mas
Distance	250 ± 6 ly (77 ± 2 pc)
Absolute magnitude (M_{V})	0.36

Details
Mass	2.24 M_{☉}
Luminosity	65.41 L_{☉}
Surface gravity (log g)	3.96 cgs
Temperature	10,014±340 K
Rotational velocity (v sin i)	183 km/s
Age	157 Myr

Other designations
- 27 Lyn, BD+51°1391, FK5 307, HD 67006, HIP 39847, HR 3173, SAO 26687, WDS J08085+5130A

Database references
SIMBAD	data

27 Lyncis is a single star in the northern constellation of Lynx. It is visible to the naked eye as a faint, white-hued star with an apparent visual magnitude of 4.78. This object is located around 250 light years away from the Sun, as determine from parallax measurements. It is moving further from the Sun with a heliocentric radial velocity of +11 km/s.

This is an ordinary A-type main-sequence star with a stellar classification of A2 V, which indicates it is generating energy through hydrogen fusion at its core. It is 157 million years old and is spinning with a projected rotational velocity of 183. The star has 2.24 times the mass of the Sun and is radiating 65 times the Sun's luminosity from its photosphere at an effective temperature of 10,014 K. X-ray emission is being detected near these coordinates, which may be coming from an undetected companion or a background source.

The Upper Tanana, Gwich'in, and Ahtna indigenous people of Alaska and northern Canada (Dene) see this star as the heart of an all-sky "Traveller" constellation, called Yahdii by the Gwich'in. The Lower Tanana instead identify 21 Lyncis as the heart.
