= HD 63332 =

F-type star in the constellation Lynx

- Location of HD 63332 (circled in red)

Observation data Epoch J2000 Equinox J2000
- Constellation: Lynx
- Right ascension: 07^{h} 51^{m} 05.71^{s}
- Declination: +54° 07′ 45.3″
- Apparent magnitude (V): 6.02±0.009

Characteristics
- Evolutionary stage: F-type main-sequence star
- Spectral type: F6V
- Apparent magnitude (B): 6.493
- Apparent magnitude (G): 5.913
- Apparent magnitude (J): 5.116
- Apparent magnitude (H): 4.914
- Apparent magnitude (K): 4.861
- B−V color index: 0.496±0.004

Astrometry
Radial velocity (R_{v})	1.331±0.157 km/s
Proper motion (μ)	RA: -39.538 mas/yr Dec.: 53.894 mas/yr
Parallax (π)	33.78±0.39 mas
Distance	97 ± 1 ly (29.6 ± 0.3 pc)
Absolute magnitude (M_{V})	3.66

Details
Mass	1.3 M_{☉}
Radius	1.375 R_{☉}
Luminosity	2.671 L_{☉}
Surface gravity (log g)	4.27 cgs
Temperature	6,298 K
Metallicity [Fe/H]	-0.12–+0.09 dex
Rotational velocity (v sin i)	9 km/s
Age	2.1 or 3.1 Gyr

Other designations
- BD+54 1177, HD 63332, HIP 38325, HR 3028, SAO 26535, PPM 31335, TIC 53336409, TYC 3783-1422-1, GSC 03783-01422, IRAS 07471+5415, 2MASS J07510571+5407452, Gaia DR2 984918228123275776, Gaia DR3 984918228123275776

Database references
SIMBAD	data

HD 63332 is an F-type main-sequence star in the constellation Lynx. The star has an apparent brightness of 6.02, meaning that it is faintly visible to the naked eye under dark skies. Parallax measurements derive a distance of 29.6 parsecs (97 light-years) to HD 63332. Considering the apparent magnitude and distance from Earth, the star's absolute magnitude is 3.66. No debris disks or exoplanets were detected around it.

== Characteristics ==
The star has a spectral classification of F6V, meaning that is a F-type main-sequence star that is currently fusing hydrogen into helium in its core. It has 1.3 times the mass and 1.375 times the radius of the Sun. HD 63332 is 2.67 times more luminous than the Sun, emitting this energy from its photosphere at an effective temperature of 6,298 K, which is around 9% hotter than the Sun. Its age is estimated at 2.1 or 3.1 billion years, equivalent to 46% and 68% of the Solar System's age respectively, (Note: The Solar System's age is 4.568 billion years.) and it rotates under its own axis at a velocity of 9 km/s. The B-V color index of the star is 0.496, giving it the yellowish-white color of a late F-type star.

HD 63332 is located in the northern hemisphere, 97 light-years from Earth, within the constellation Lynx. It has an apparent magnitude of 6.02, which makes it faintly visible to the naked eye, under dark skies. The absolute magnitude, i.e. its brightness if it was seen at 10 pc (32.6 ly), is 3.66. The star makes part of the thin disk population of the Milky Way, being located at a maximum distance of 60 parsecs (200 ly) from the galactic plane. Its orbit around the galaxy has a low eccentricity of 0.06.

No debris disks have been detected around it as of 2016, and no exoplanets were detected around it as of 2012. It has a 27% possibility of hosting an exoplanet made up of volatiles, lithophiles, siderophiles and iron. The habitable zone is located at a distance of 1.63 astronomical units from the star.
