= HD 77912 =

Star in the constellation Lynx

- Location of HD 77912 (circled in red)

Observation data Epoch J2000 Equinox ICRS
- Constellation: Lynx
- Right ascension: 09^{h} 06^{m} 31.76860^{s}
- Declination: +38° 27′ 07.9756″
- Apparent magnitude (V): 4.56

Characteristics
- Spectral type: G7 II Ba0.2
- B−V color index: 1.037±0.003

Astrometry
Radial velocity (R_{v})	+16.6±0.2 km/s
Proper motion (μ)	RA: −27.653 mas/yr Dec.: −15.055 mas/yr
Parallax (π)	5.0045±0.1977 mas
Distance	650 ± 30 ly (200 ± 8 pc)
Absolute magnitude (M_{V})	−1.46±0.093

Details
Mass	4.60 M_{☉}
Radius	33±5 R_{☉}
Luminosity	1,168.35 L_{☉}
Surface gravity (log g)	1.75 cgs
Temperature	4,899 K
Metallicity [Fe/H]	−0.14 dex

Other designations
- BD+39°2200, FK5 1237, HD 77912, HIP 44700, HR 3612, SAO 61254

Database references
SIMBAD	data

HD 77912 is a single star in the northern constellation of Lynx. It is visible to the naked eye with an apparent visual magnitude of 4.56. The star is located 650 light years from the Sun, as determined from its annual parallax shift of 5.0 mas. It is moving further away with a heliocentric radial velocity of +16.6 km/s. HD 77912 has a peculiar velocity of 23.1+2.9
−1.1 km/s, which may mark it as a runaway star.

The stellar classification of HD 77912 is G7 II Ba0.2, indicating it is a bright giant with a mild overabundance of barium. It has 4.6 times the mass of the Sun and has expanded to 33 times the Sun's radius. The star is radiating 1,168 times the Sun's luminosity from its enlarged photosphere at an effective temperature of 4,899 K.
