= 1 Lyncis =

Red giant star in the constellation Lynx

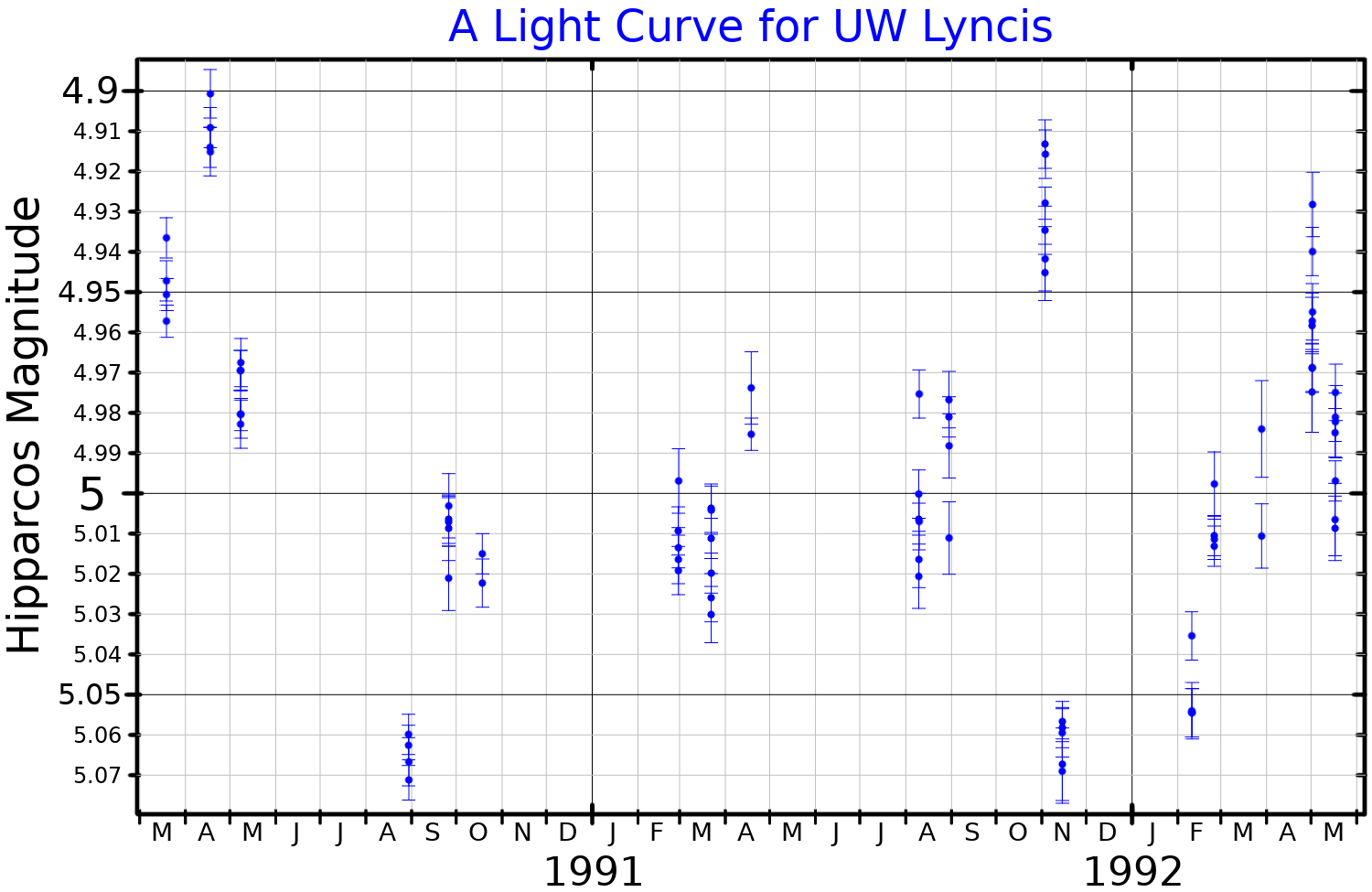
- A light curve for UW Lyncis, plotted from Hipparcos data

Observation data Epoch J2000 Equinox J2000
- Constellation: Lynx
- Right ascension: 06^{h} 17^{m} 54.81907^{s}
- Declination: +61° 30′ 55.0251″
- Apparent magnitude (V): 4.95

Characteristics
- Evolutionary stage: asymptotic giant branch
- Spectral type: M3IIIab
- U−B color index: +1.96
- B−V color index: +1.83
- Variable type: Lb?

Astrometry
Radial velocity (R_{v})	+11.56±0.44 km/s
Proper motion (μ)	RA: −10.59±0.36 mas/yr Dec.: −3.11±0.29 mas/yr
Parallax (π)	5.11±0.33 mas
Distance	640 ± 40 ly (200 ± 10 pc)
Absolute magnitude (M_{V})	−1.44

Details
Radius	156 R_{☉}
Luminosity	2,848 L_{☉}
Temperature	3,485 K

Other designations
- 1 Lyn, UW Lyn, BD+61°869, FK5 2479, HD 42973, HIP 29919, HR 2215, SAO 13787

Database references
SIMBAD	data

1 Lyncis is a single star in the northern constellation of Lynx. It is also known by its variable star designation of UW Lyncis; 1 Lyncis is the Flamsteed designation. This object is visible to the naked eye as a faint, reddish-hued star with an apparent visual magnitude of 4.95. It is moving further from the Earth with a heliocentric radial velocity of 12 km/s.

The star is an aging red giant of spectral type M3IIIab, currently on the asymptotic giant branch, having exhausted the hydrogen at its core and evolved away from the main sequence. It has been classified as a possible slow irregular variable, after being found to be slightly variable in 1969 by Olin J. Eggen. Its changes in brightness are complex, with two shorter changeable periods of 35–40 and 47–50 days due to the star's pulsations, and a longer period of 1,500 days possibly due to the star's rotation or convectively induced oscillatory thermal (COT) mode. The star has expanded to 156 times the Sun's radius and it is radiating 2,848 times the luminosity of the Sun from its enlarged photosphere at an effective temperature of 3,485 K.
