= 38 Lyncis =

Star in the constellation Lynx

- Location of 38 Lyncis (circled in red)

Observation data Epoch J2000 Equinox J2000
- Constellation: Lynx
- Right ascension: 09^{h} 18^{m} 50.64384^{s}
- Declination: +36° 48′ 09.3331″
- Apparent magnitude (V): 3.82 (3.95 + ? + 6.30)

Characteristics
- Spectral type: A3V (A1V + A4V)
- B−V color index: 0.066±0.010

Astrometry
Radial velocity (R_{v})	4.0±2.7 km/s
Absolute magnitude (M_{V})	+0.98

A
Proper motion (μ)	RA: –36.288 mas/yr Dec.: −121.767 mas/yr
Parallax (π)	27.8044±0.7879 mas
Distance	117 ± 3 ly (36 ± 1 pc)

B
Proper motion (μ)	RA: –26.513 mas/yr Dec.: −127.261 mas/yr
Parallax (π)	24.4730±0.1240 mas
Distance	133.3 ± 0.7 ly (40.9 ± 0.2 pc)

Details

38 Lyn A
Mass	1.90 M_{☉}
Radius	3.07 R_{☉}
Luminosity	32 L_{☉}
Surface gravity (log g)	3.86 cgs
Temperature	8,862±301 K
Metallicity [Fe/H]	−0.36 dex
Rotational velocity (v sin i)	163 km/s
Age	213 Myr

38 Lyn B
Mass	1.30/0.90 M_{☉}
Radius	2.55 R_{☉}
Luminosity	5 L_{☉}
Temperature	5,409 K

Other designations
- 38 Lyn, BD+37°1965, FK5 346, HD 80081, HIP 45688, HR 3690, SAO 61391, WDS J09188+3648

Database references
SIMBAD	data
- A
- B

38 Lyncis is a multiple star system in the northern constellation of Lynx. It located about 125 light-years from the Sun, based on parallax.

When viewed through a moderate telescope, two components—a brighter blue-white star of magnitude 3.9 and a fainter star of magnitude 6.1 that has been described as lilac as well as blue-white—can be seen. The pair have an angular separation of 2.6″ and an estimated period of 429 years. The fainter component is itself a close binary which can only be resolved using speckle interferometry. The two were separated by 0.06″ in 1993 and 0.237″ in 2008, and have an estimated orbital period of 2.1 years. A further faint star, component E 100″ away, is a proper-motion companion. Two other faint companions listed in multiple star catalogues as components C and D are unrelated background objects.

38 Lyncis was given as a standard star for the spectral class of A3 V when the Morgan-Keenan classification system was first defined in 1943, apparently for the two components combined.

The primary star, component A, is a class A main sequence star around twice the mass of the sun. An effective temperature of 8,862 K and a radius of 3.09 R_{☉} mean that it is over thirty times more luminous than the sun. It has been listed as a λ Boötis star, although it is no longer considered to be a member. The fainter of the pair, component B, has been given a spectral class of A4V, although it consists of two very close stars. Their properties are poorly-known, even the difference in their apparent magnitudes can only be estimated to be approximately 2. Based on this, their masses are estimated to be 1.3 M_{☉} and 0.9 M_{☉} respectively. Component E is a 15th magnitude star with an approximate spectral type of M2, a red dwarf, and an estimated mass of 0.31 M_{☉}, and a temperature of 3,816 K.
