= 2 Lyncis =

Binary star in the constellation Lynx

- Location of 2 Lyncis (circled in red)

Observation data Epoch J2000 Equinox ICRS
- Constellation: Lynx
- Right ascension: 06^{h} 19^{m} 37.38458^{s}
- Declination: +59° 00′ 39.4683″
- Apparent magnitude (V): 4.44

Characteristics
- Evolutionary stage: main sequence
- Spectral type: A2 Vs
- B−V color index: 0.032±0.004
- Variable type: Eclipsing binary

Astrometry
Radial velocity (R_{v})	−2.0±0.1 km/s
Proper motion (μ)	RA: −5.35 mas/yr Dec.: +23.86 mas/yr
Parallax (π)	20.83±0.40 mas
Distance	157 ± 3 ly (48.0 ± 0.9 pc)
Absolute magnitude (M_{V})	1.03

Orbit
Period (P)	1306.82±0.96 d
Eccentricity (e)	0.497±0.010
Periastron epoch (T)	2450962.0±2.0
Argument of periastron (ω) (secondary)	186.30±0.79°
Semi-amplitude (K_{1}) (primary)	3.281±0.044 km/s

Details

2 Lyn A
Mass	2.32±0.02 M_{☉}
Radius	2.2 R_{☉}
Luminosity	39.5+1.8 −1.7 L_{☉}
Surface gravity (log g)	4.1±0.1 cgs
Temperature	9,310±100 K
Rotation	1.56 d
Rotational velocity (v sin i)	44 km/s

2 Lyn B
Mass	0.46 M_{☉}

Other designations
- 2 Lyn, UZ Lyn, BD+59°959, FK5 237, HD 43378, HIP 30060, HR 2238, SAO 25665

Database references
SIMBAD	data

2 Lyncis is a binary star system in the northern constellation Lynx. It is visible to the naked eye, having an apparent visual magnitude of 4.44. The distance to this system, judging by an annual parallax shift of 20.83±0.40 mas, is around 157 light years. It is moving closer to the Sun with a heliocentric radial velocity of −2 km/s.

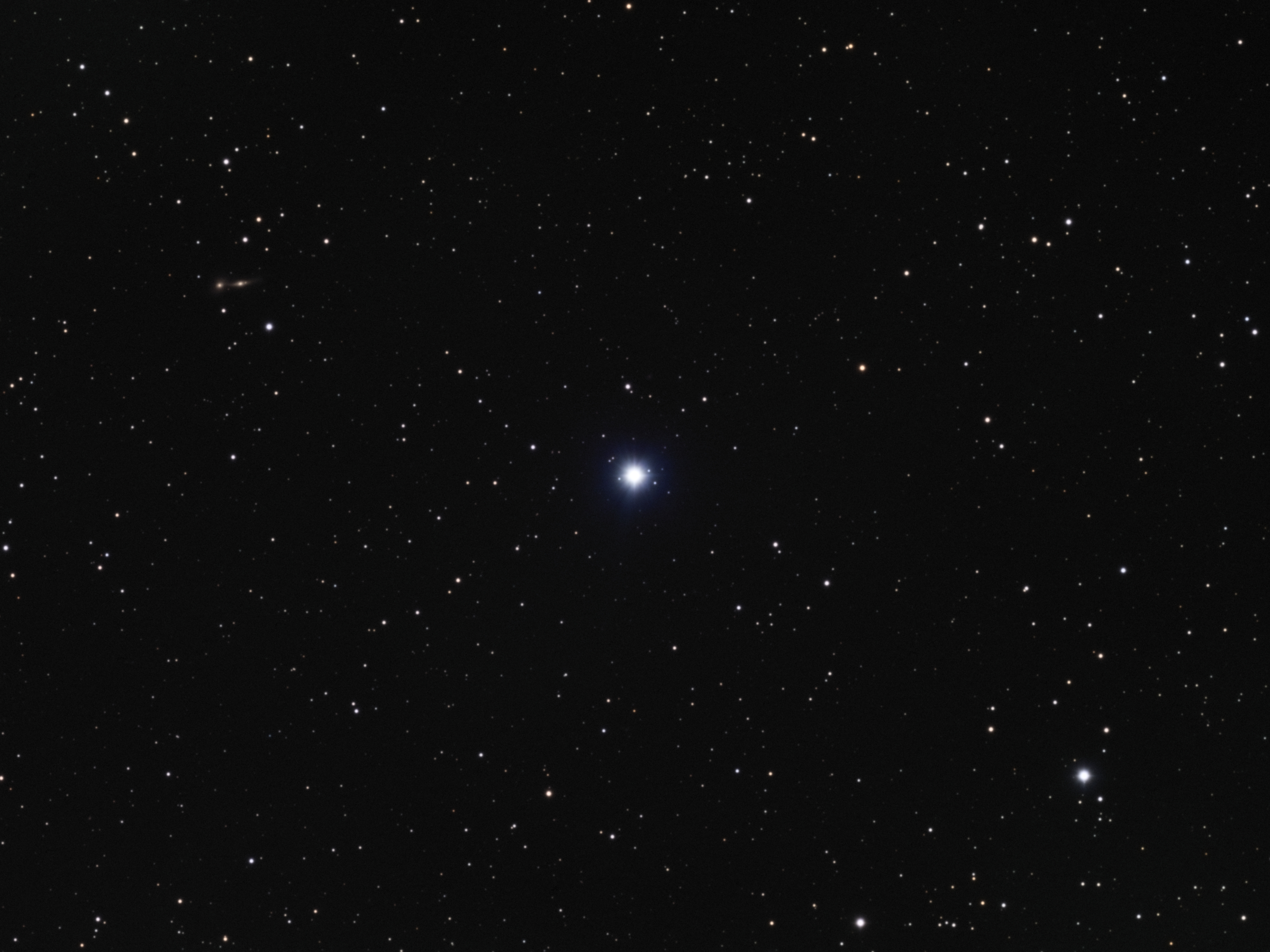
2 Lyncis in optical light.

This is a spectroscopic binary star system with an orbital period of around 3.6 years and an eccentricity of 0.5. It is classified as a probable (91% chance) eclipsing binary with the variable star designation UZ Lyn, showing a net magnitude decrease of 0.3 during an occultation.

The primary component is an A-type main-sequence star with a stellar classification of A2 Vs, where the 's' indicates narrow (sharp) absorption lines. The orbiting companion may be the source of the X-ray emission from this system, as stars similar to the primary component do not generally produce detectable levels of X-rays.
