= 19 Lyncis =

Star in the constellation Lynx

Observation data Epoch J2000 Equinox ICRS
- Constellation: Lynx
- 19 Lyn A
- Right ascension: 07^{h} 22^{m} 52.05811^{s}
- Declination: +55° 16′ 53.0226″
- Apparent magnitude (V): 5.80
- 19 Lyn B
- Right ascension: 07^{h} 22^{m} 50.84965^{s}
- Declination: +55° 17′ 03.54920″
- Apparent magnitude (V): 6.86

Characteristics

19 Lyn A
- Spectral type: B8 V
- B−V color index: −0.078±0.005

19 Lyn B
- Spectral type: B9 V
- B−V color index: −0.051±0.008

Astrometry

19 Lyn A
Radial velocity (R_{v})	5.2±2 km/s
Proper motion (μ)	RA: −2.806 mas/yr Dec.: −31.485 mas/yr
Parallax (π)	4.7743±0.1525 mas
Distance	680 ± 20 ly (209 ± 7 pc)

19 Lyn B
Radial velocity (R_{v})	10.00±3.7 km/s
Proper motion (μ)	RA: −2.612 mas/yr Dec.: −30.802 mas/yr
Parallax (π)	4.6939±0.0784 mas
Distance	690 ± 10 ly (213 ± 4 pc)

Orbit
Primary	19 Lyn Aa
Name	19 Lyn Ab
Period (P)	2.2596 d
Eccentricity (e)	0.08
Longitude of the node (Ω)	126.1°
Periastron epoch (T)	2,419,031.632 JD
Semi-amplitude (K_{1}) (primary)	106.4 km/s
Semi-amplitude (K_{2}) (secondary)	199.1 km/s

Details

19 Lyn A
Mass	3.33±0.14 M_{☉}
Luminosity	166.0+41.5 −33.3 L_{☉}
Temperature	12,078+84 −83 K
Rotational velocity (v sin i)	70 km/s

19 Lyn B
Mass	3.03±0.14 M_{☉}
Luminosity	127.9+32.1 −25.6 L_{☉}
Temperature	10,691+49 −50 K
Rotational velocity (v sin i)	275 km/s

Other designations
- 19 Lyn, BD+55°1192, CCDM J07228+5518, WDS J07229+5517
- 19 Lyn A: HD 57103, HIP 35785, HR 2784, SAO 26312
- 19 Lyn B: GC 9799, HD 57102, HIP 35783, HR 2783, SAO 26311

Database references
SIMBAD	19 Lyn A
- 19 Lyn B

19 Lyncis is a triple star system in the northern constellation of Lynx. A telescope reveals it consists of two blue-white hued stars of magnitudes 5.80 and 6.86 that are 14.750 arcseconds apart, with a visual companion of magnitude 7.6 that is 3.5 arcminutes distant. The first two are located around 680–690 light years away from the Sun, based on parallax measurements. Their radial velocity measurements are poorly constrained, but suggest the system is trending away from the Earth.

The primary, designated component A, is itself a double-lined spectroscopic binary system with an orbital period of 2.26 days and an eccentricity of 0.08. The more prominent member of this pair, component Aa, is a B-type main-sequence star with a stellar classification of B8 V. It has 3.33 times the mass of the Sun and is spinning with a projected rotational velocity of 70 km/s. Component B has a class of B9 V, an estimated 3.03 times the mass of the Sun, and is spinning rapidly with a projected rotational velocity of 275 km/s.
