= 36 Lyncis =

Star in the constellation Lynx

- Location of 36 Lyncis (circled in red)

Observation data Epoch J2000 Equinox J2000
- Constellation: Lynx
- Right ascension: 09^{h} 13^{m} 48.21318^{s}
- Declination: +43° 13′ 04.1940″
- Apparent magnitude (V): 5.30

Characteristics
- Evolutionary stage: main sequence
- Spectral type: B9IVpHgMn
- B−V color index: −0.130±0.003
- Variable type: SX Ari

Astrometry
Radial velocity (R_{v})	21.3±1.7 km/s
Proper motion (μ)	RA: −30.236 mas/yr Dec.: −32.032 mas/yr
Parallax (π)	5.2687±0.1577 mas
Distance	620 ± 20 ly (190 ± 6 pc)
Absolute magnitude (M_{V})	−0.95

Details
Mass	4.2 M_{☉}
Radius	3.4 R_{☉}
Luminosity	505 L_{☉}
Surface gravity (log g)	3.65 cgs
Temperature	13,700 K
Metallicity [Fe/H]	+0.60 dex
Rotation	3.83476±0.00004 d
Rotational velocity (v sin i)	49±1 km/s
Age	79-110 Myr

Other designations
- 36 Lyn, EI Lyn, BD+43°1893, FK5 346, HD 79158, HIP 45290, HR 3652, SAO 42759

Database references
SIMBAD	data

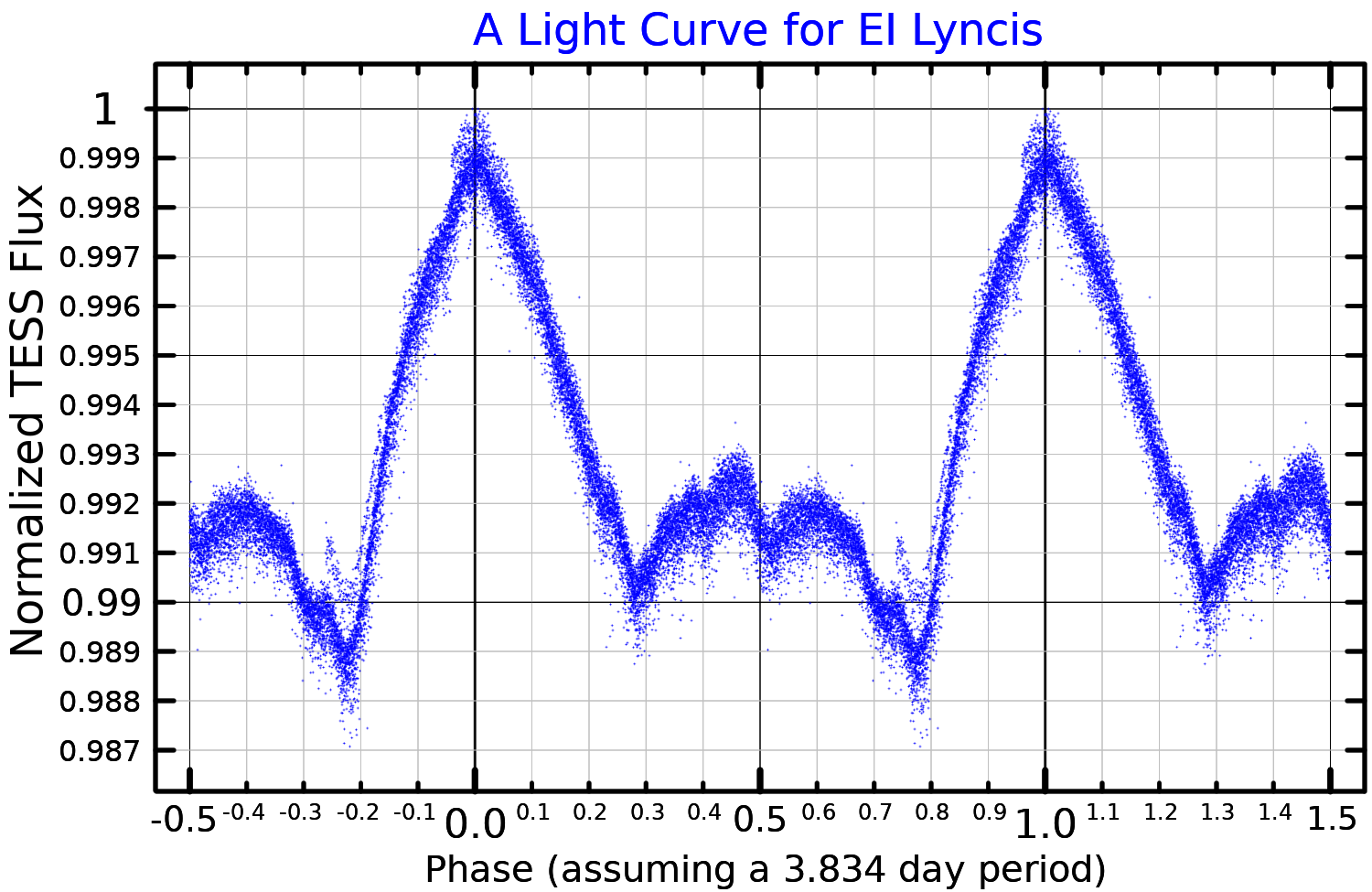
A light curve for EI Lyncis, plotted from TESS data

36 Lyncis is a solitary variable star located around 620 light years away from the Sun in the northern constellation of Lynx. It has the variable star designation of EI Lyncis, while 36 Lyncis is the Flamsteed designation. This object is visible to the naked eye as a dim, blue-white hued star with an apparent visual magnitude of 5.30. It is moving further away from the Earth with a heliocentric radial velocity of 21 km/s.

This is a magnetic, helium-weak Bp star with a stellar classification of B9IVpHgMn, although the spectral peculiarities have led to alternate classifications such as B8 IIImnp. It is sometimes classified as a mercury-manganese star. It is also an 'sn' star, displaying a spectrum with generally sharp lines for most elements in combination with broad, diffuse lines of helium. 36 Lyncis has been classified as an SX Arietis variable with an amplitude of 0.03 in visual magnitude and a rotationally-modulated period of 3.834 days. The star is spinning with a projected rotational velocity of 49 km/s and a rotation rate of 3.83476 days. It has 3.4 times the Sun's radius and is radiating 505 times the luminosity of the Sun from its photosphere at an effective temperature of 13,700 K.
