= 15 Lyncis =

Star in the constellation Lynx

- Location of 15 Lyncis (circled in red)

Observation data Epoch J2000 Equinox ICRS
- Constellation: Lynx
- Right ascension: 06^{h} 57^{m} 16.60526^{s}
- Declination: +58° 25′ 21.9404″
- Apparent magnitude (V): 4.35 (4.7 / 5.8)

Characteristics
- Spectral type: G8III + F8V
- U−B color index: +0.51
- B−V color index: +0.85

Astrometry
Radial velocity (R_{v})	1.86±0.28 km/s
Proper motion (μ)	RA: 6.08 mas/yr Dec.: -122.83 mas/yr
Parallax (π)	18.29±0.25 mas
Distance	178 ± 2 ly (54.7 ± 0.7 pc)

Orbit
Period (P)	262.0 yr
Semi-major axis (a)	1.19″
Eccentricity (e)	0.74
Inclination (i)	78.0°
Longitude of the node (Ω)	43.4°
Periastron epoch (T)	B 1992.68
Argument of periastron (ω) (secondary)	98.0°

Details

15 Lyn A
Radius	8 R_{☉}
Luminosity	40 L_{☉}
Surface gravity (log g)	3.0 cgs
Temperature	5,164±5 K
Metallicity [Fe/H]	0.05 dex

Other designations
- 15 Lyn, BD+58°982, HD 50522, HIP 33449, HR 2560, SAO 26051

Database references
SIMBAD	data

15 Lyncis is a binary star system in the northern constellation of Lynx. It is visible to the naked eye as a faint point of light with a combined apparent visual magnitude of 4.35. Based on the system's parallax, it is located 178 light-years (54.7 parsecs) away. The pair are moving away from the Earth with a heliocentric radial velocity of +2 km/s.

A telescope reveals it is formed by two yellowish stars of magnitudes 4.7 and 5.8 that are 0.9 arcseconds apart. The two stars orbit each other every 262 years and the orbital eccentricity is 0.74. The components are a magnitude 4.7 evolved giant star of spectral type G8III, and a magnitude 5.8 F-type main-sequence star of spectral type F8V. The former has exhausted the hydrogen at its core, causing it to expand to 8 times the Sun's radius. It is radiating 40 times the luminosity of the Sun from its enlarged photosphere at an effective temperature of 5,164 K.
