= 24 Lyncis =

Star in the constellation Lynx

Observation data Epoch J2000 Equinox J2000
- Constellation: Lynx
- Right ascension: 07^{h} 43^{m} 00.41551^{s}
- Declination: +58° 42′ 37.2950″
- Apparent magnitude (V): 4.93

Characteristics
- Spectral type: A3 IVn
- B−V color index: +0.104±0.015

Astrometry
Radial velocity (R_{v})	+9.4±2.3 km/s
Proper motion (μ)	RA: −37.50 mas/yr Dec.: −52.29 mas/yr
Parallax (π)	12.22±0.20 mas
Distance	267 ± 4 ly (82 ± 1 pc)
Absolute magnitude (M_{V})	0.37

Details
Mass	1.89 M_{☉}
Radius	1.7 R_{☉}
Luminosity	60.81 L_{☉}
Surface gravity (log g)	3.25 cgs
Temperature	8,786±299 K
Rotational velocity (v sin i)	233 km/s
Age	262 Myr

Other designations
- 24 Lyn, BD+59° 1103, FK5 292, HD 61497, HIP 37609, HR 2946, SAO 26474, WDS J07430+5843A

Database references
SIMBAD	data

24 Lyncis is a single star in the northern constellation of Lynx. It is visible to the naked eye as a dim, white-hued star with an apparent visual magnitude of 4.96. The distance to this star, as determined from its parallax measurements, is around 274 light years. It is moving further away from the Earth with a heliocentric radial velocity of about +9 km/s.

This object has a stellar classification of A3 IVn, matching an A-type star with a subgiant luminosity class. The 'n' suffix indicates "nebulous" absorption lines due to rapid rotation. The star is spinning with a projected rotational velocity of 233 km/s, giving it an equatorial bulge that is 17% larger than the polar radius. Zorec et al. (2012) estimate the star is actually 88% of the way through its main sequence lifetime. It is 262 million years old with 1.89 times the mass of the Sun. 24 Lyncis is radiating 61 times the luminosity of the Sun from its photosphere at an effective temperature of 8,786 K.

There is a magnitude 11.15 visual companion at an angular separation of 55″ along a position angle of 324°, as of 2010.
