= 31 Lyncis =

Star in the constellation Lynx

- Location of 31 Lyncis (circled in red)

Observation data Epoch J2000 Equinox ICRS
- Constellation: Lynx
- Right ascension: 08^{h} 22^{m} 50.11000^{s}
- Declination: +43° 11′ 17.2724″
- Apparent magnitude (V): +4.25

Characteristics
- Spectral type: K4+ III
- B−V color index: 1.550±0.003
- Variable type: SRd

Astrometry
| Radial velocity (R_{v}) | +24.56±0.22 km/s |
| Proper motion (μ) | RA: −25.16±0.36 mas/yr Dec.: −99.23±0.21 mas/yr |
| Parallax (π) | 8.53±0.25 mas |
| Distance | 380 ± 10 ly (117 ± 3 pc) |
| Absolute magnitude (M_{V}) | −1.09 |

Details
| Mass | 1.95±0.18 M_{☉} |
| Radius | 53.27+1.64 −1.55 R_{☉} |
| Luminosity | 782.4±60.3 L_{☉} |
| Surface gravity (log g) | 1.46±0.12 cgs |
| Temperature | 3,921±19 K |
| Metallicity [Fe/H] | −0.06±0.05 dex |
| Age | 1.32±0.23 Gyr |

Other designations
- Alsciaukat, 31 Lyn, BN Lyn, NSV 4030, BD+43°1815, FK5 314, GC 11401, HD 70272, HIP 41075, HR 3275, SAO 42319

Database references
| SIMBAD | data |

31 Lyncis is the fourth-brightest star in the constellation of Lynx. It has the traditional name Alsciaukat, pronounced /ælʃiˈɔːkæt/. The orange-hued star is visible to the naked eye with a baseline apparent visual magnitude of +4.25. It is a single star located about 380 light years away from the Sun, based on parallax, and is moving further away with a heliocentric radial velocity of +25 km/s.

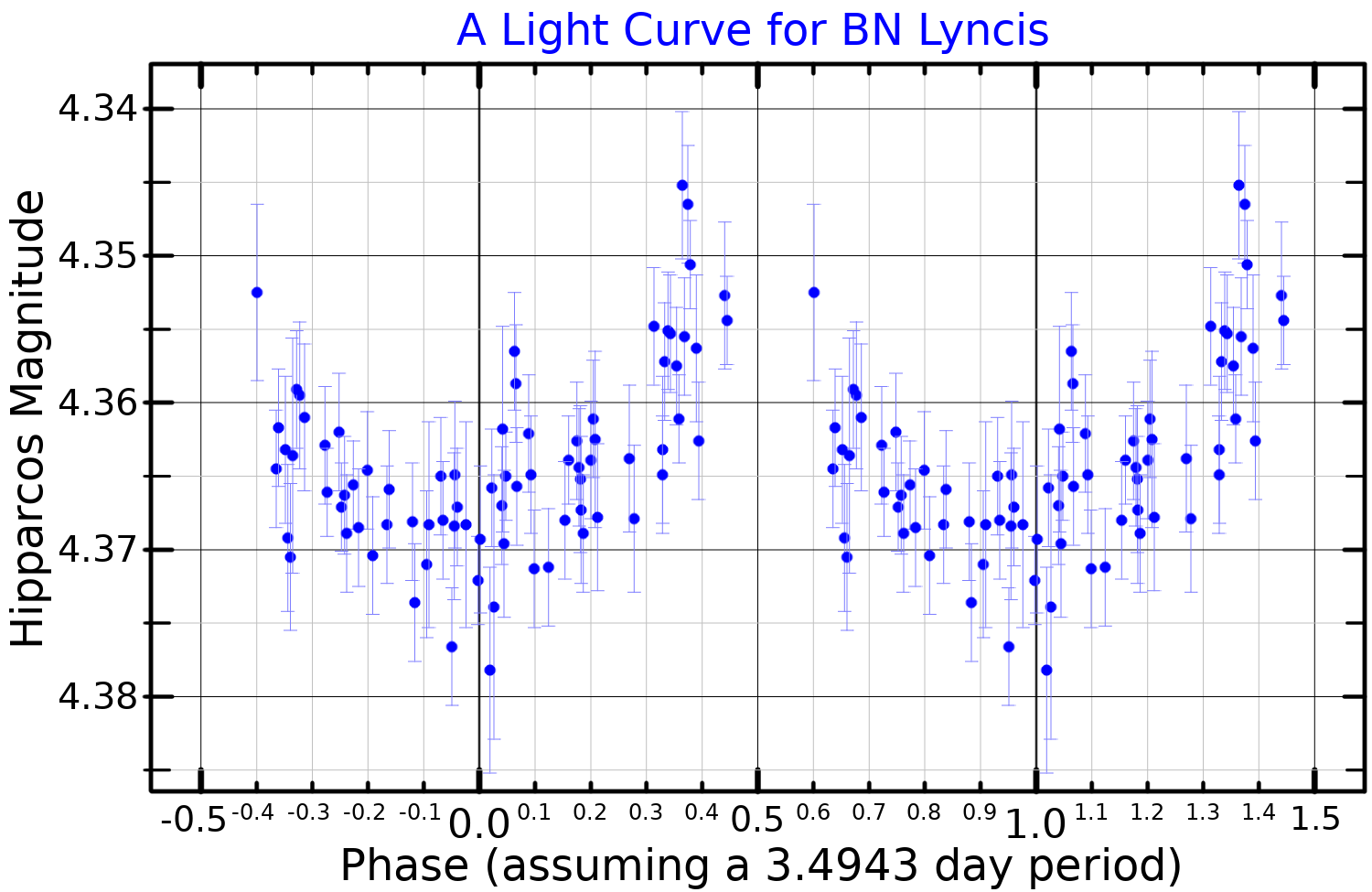
A light curve for BN Lyncis, plotted from Hipparcos data

This object is an aging giant star with a stellar classification of K4+ III. A 1993 study found that it varied in brightness by 0.05 magnitude over 25 to 30 days. On the other hand, a 2002 study of the Hipparcos data found a period of 3.5 days. It is classified as a semiregular variable with a brightness that ranges from 4.21 to as low as 4.27, and has the variable star designation BN Lyncis.

31 Lyncis is 1.3 billion years old with almost double the mass of the Sun. With the supply of hydrogen at its core exhausted, the star has expanded to 53 times the Sun's radius. It is radiating around 782 times the Sun's luminosity from its swollen photosphere at an effective temperature of 3,921 K.

== Nomenclature ==
31 Lyncis is the star's Flamsteed designation.

It bore the traditional names Alsciaukat, from Arabic الشوكة aš-šawkat "the thorn", and Mabsuthat, from Arabic المبسوطة al-mabsūtah "the outstretched (paw)". In 2016, the International Astronomical Union (IAU) organized a Working Group on Star Names (WGSN) to catalog and standardize proper names for stars. The WGSN approved the name Alsciaukat for this star on 30 June 2017 and it is now so included in the List of IAU-approved Star Names.
