= Light travel time effect =

The light travel time effect is defined as the differences that occur in the periodic eclipses of binary stars when they are disturbed by another massive object.

The periods of the orbits in an undisturbed eclipsing binary star system stay relatively stable, since the center of mass does not change in position. A more massive object can disturb the center of mass of the binary system and change the periodic nature of the orbits in the binary. The disturbance caused by this larger object results in the system being further away or closer to the observer at times, making the timings of the eclipses in the binary change.

If the binary systems have planets, the more massive object can cause transit-timing variations in the orbiting planets.
