= 21 Lyncis =

Star in the constellation Lynx

- Location of 21 Lyncis (circled in red)

Observation data Epoch J2000 Equinox J2000
- Constellation: Lynx
- Right ascension: 07^{h} 26^{m} 42.85187^{s}
- Declination: +49° 12′ 41.4907″
- Apparent magnitude (V): 4.61

Characteristics
- Evolutionary stage: main sequence
- Spectral type: A0.5Vs
- B−V color index: −0.001±0.002

Astrometry
Radial velocity (R_{v})	+26.8±0.1 km/s
Proper motion (μ)	RA: −10.22 mas/yr Dec.: −49.29 mas/yr
Parallax (π)	11.92±0.24 mas
Distance	274 ± 6 ly (84 ± 2 pc)
Absolute magnitude (M_{V})	−0.01

Details
Mass	2.22 M_{☉}
Luminosity	102.01 L_{☉}
Temperature	9,692±330 K
Rotational velocity (v sin i)	18 km/s
Age	272 Myr

Other designations
- 21 Lyn, BD+49°1623, FK5 2572, HD 58142, HIP 36145, HR 2818, SAO 41764

Database references
SIMBAD	data

21 Lyncis is a single star in the northern constellation of Lynx. It is visible to the naked eye as a faint, white-hued star with an apparent visual magnitude of 4.61. The star is located at a distance of about 274 light years away from the Sun, based on parallax. It is moving further away from the Earth with a heliocentric radial velocity of around +27 km/s.

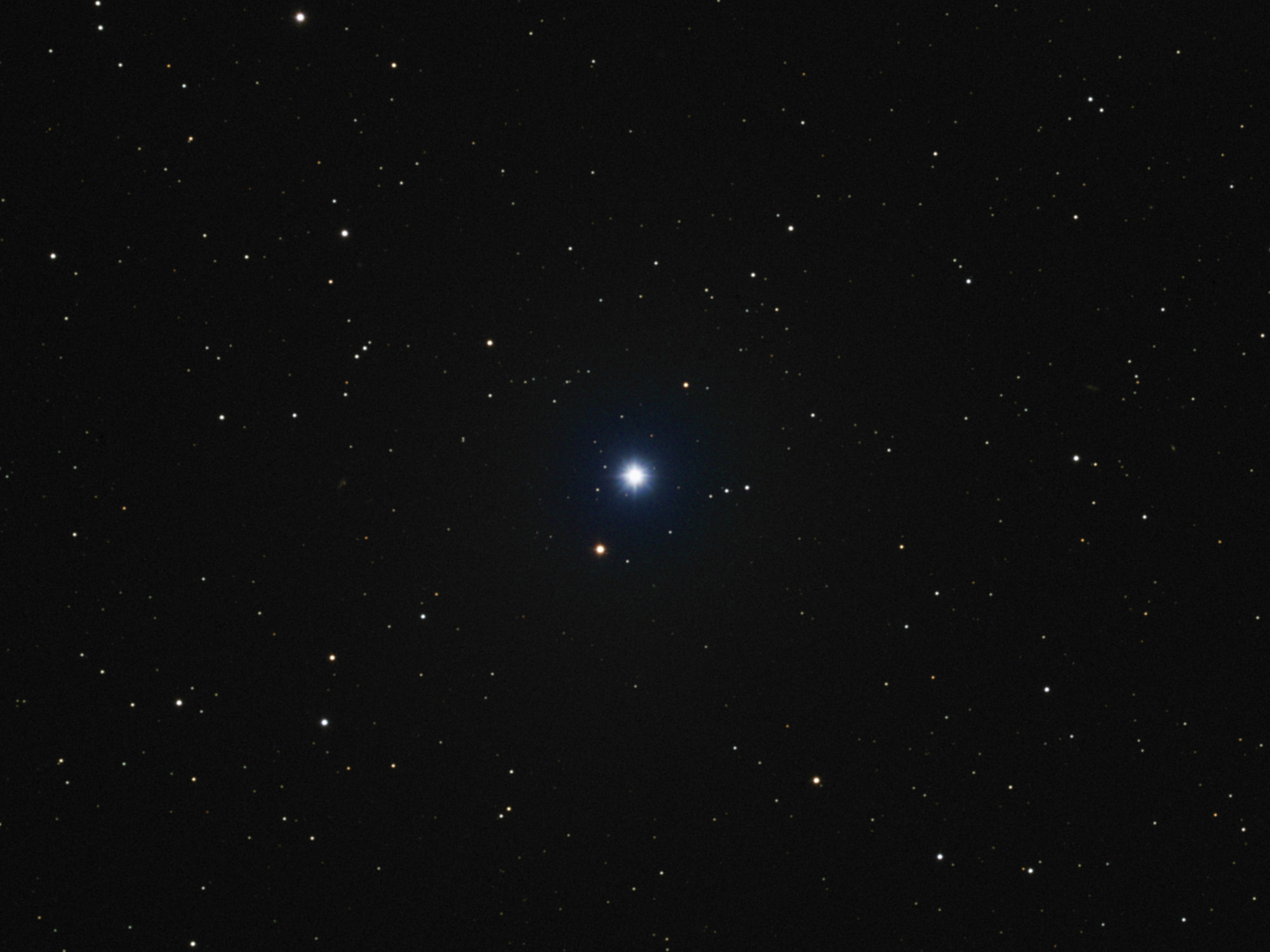
21 Lyncis (center) in optical light

This object is an ordinary A-type main-sequence star with a stellar classification of A0.5Vs, where the 's' suffix indicates "sharp" lines in the spectrum, usually due to slow rotation. It is about 272 million years old with a projected rotational velocity of 18 km/s. The star has 2.22 times the mass of the Sun and is radiating 102 times the luminosity of the Sun from its photosphere at an effective temperature of 9,692 K.
