= UGC 5898 =

A spiral galaxy in the constellation Leo Minor

- UGC 5898 seen by Legacy Surveys

Observation data (J2000 epoch)
- Constellation: Leo Minor
- Right ascension: 10^{h} 47^{m} 50.3622^{s}
- Declination: +33° 43′ 44.044″
- Redshift: 0.005484
- Heliocentric radial velocity: 1648 km/s
- Galactocentric velocity: 1626 ± 2 km/s
- Distance: 28.37 ± 2.01 Megaparsecs
- Group or cluster: LGG 218
- Apparent magnitude (B): 16.0
- Absolute magnitude (B): -17.24 ± 0.789
- Surface brightness: 24.06

Characteristics
- Type: Sdm
- Size: 14.55 kiloparsecs

Other designations
- LEDA 32259, MCG+06-24-014, SDSS J104750.34+334342.5, PGC 32259

UGC 5898 is a late-type spiral galaxy galaxy in the constellation Leo Minor.

== Properties ==
UGC 5898 does not host an active galactic nucleus, and was found to exhibit two stream-like features. It has an isophotal axis ratio of 0.15, a stellar mass of 2.43 × 10^{8} M⊙, neutral hydrogen (H I) mass of 7.41 × 10^{8} M⊙ and a star formation rate derived from 22 μm unWISE of 0.0145 M⊙ yr^{-1}.

In a GALEX survey, UGC 5898 has a concentration, asymmetry and smoothness of near-ultraviolet of 2.727 ± 0.080, 0.430 ± 0.058 and 0.240 ± 0.009, respectively. UGC 5898 also has a concentration, asymmetry and smoothness of far-ultraviolet of 2.489 ± 0.083, 0.744 ± 0.035 and 0.290 ± 0.015, respectively.

== Environment ==
UGC 5898 is part of a galaxy group known as LGG 218. It consists of at least 11 members, including NGC 3430, NGC 3381, NGC 3395, NGC 3424, NGC 3442, NGC 3396, IC 2604, LEDA 32631, UGC 5990 and UGC 5934. It is located in a filament known as Leo Minor B, which is connected to the Virgo Cluster.
