= UGC 5990 =

Spiral galaxy in the constellation Leo Minor

- UGC 5990 seen by DESI Legacy Surveys

Observation data (J2000 epoch)
- Constellation: Leo Minor
- Right ascension: 10^{h} 52^{m} 38.4040^{s}
- Declination: +34° 28′ 59.722″
- Redshift: 0.005227
- Heliocentric radial velocity: 1587 km/s
- Galactocentric velocity: 1558 ± 2 km/s
- Distance: 31.3 ± 5.5 Megaparsec
- Group or cluster: LGG 218
- Apparent magnitude (B): 15.1
- Absolute magnitude (B): -17.80 ± 0.435
- Surface brightness: 23.52 mag/arcsec2
- Magnitude (J): 12.474
- Magnitude (H): 11.797
- Magnitude (K): 11.706

Characteristics
- Type: Sab
- Size: 14.91 kiloparsec
- Apparent size (V): 1.5 arcmin x 0.4 arcmin

Other designations
- UGC 5990, LEDA 32652, MCG +06-24-029, 2MFGC 8478, HRS26, SDSS 587739096444829722

UGC 5990 is a spiral galaxy located in the constellation of Leo Minor.

== Properties ==
UGC 5990 is does not host an active galactic nucleus and shows no signs of tidal features or streams. It's supermassive black hole has an estimated mass (derived from near ultraviolet) of 2.29 × 10⁷ solar masses, while it's estimated mass from far ultraviolet is 1.15 × 10⁷ solar masses. UGC 5990 has an E(B−V) reddening value of 0.0186, an ellipticity of 0.71, an Hα flux of 1.55 × 10⁻¹³ erg s⁻¹ cm⁻² and is classified as a star forming galaxy. UGC 5990 has a star formation rate (SFR[Hα_{corr}]) of 0.09 ± 0.02 M☉/yr, a total infrared luminosity (L_{TIR}) of (0.20 ± 0.02) × 10⁴³ erg s⁻¹ and a 22 micron luminosity of (0.18 ± 0.01) × 10⁴² erg s⁻¹.

== Environment ==
UGC 5990 is part of a galaxy group known as LGG 218. It consists of at least 10 galaxies, namely NGC 3381, NGC 3430, NGC 3395, NGC 3424, NGC 3442 and NGC 3396. It is part of the Leo Cloud (21 -9 9), and is in a filament connected to the Virgo Cluster known as Leo Minor B (also known as Crater Cloud in other studies) along with other galaxies such as UGC 5829, UGC 4720 and NGC 2780.

== See Also ==
- UGC 5460
- UGC 11397
- UGC 4599
- UGC 12158
- NGC 3395
