= 46 Leonis Minoris =

Star in the constellation of Leo Minor

- Location of 46 Leonis Minoris (circled)

Observation data Epoch J2000 Equinox ICRS
- Constellation: Leo Minor
- Right ascension: 10^{h} 53^{m} 18.70487^{s}
- Declination: +34° 12′ 53.5375″
- Apparent magnitude (V): 3.83 (3.79–3.84)

Characteristics
- Evolutionary stage: red clump
- Spectral type: K0+ III-IV
- Variable type: suspected

Astrometry
Proper motion (μ)	RA: +90.625 mas/yr Dec.: −278.64 mas/yr
Parallax (π)	32.921±0.1775 mas
Distance	99.1 ± 0.5 ly (30.4 ± 0.2 pc)
Absolute magnitude (M_{V})	+1.45

Details
Mass	1.09±0.04 M_{☉}
Radius	8.21±0.06 R_{☉}
Luminosity	27.42±1.38 L_{☉}
Surface gravity (log g)	2.674±0.013 cgs
Temperature	4,670 K
Metallicity [Fe/H]	−0.1 dex
Rotational velocity (v sin i)	1.81 km/s
Age	8.2±1.9 Gyr

Other designations
- Praecipua, 46 LMi, BD+34 2172, FK5 412, HD 94264, HIP 53229, HR 4247, SAO 62297

Database references
SIMBAD	data

46 Leonis Minoris (abbreviated 46 LMi), also named Praecipua /prɪˈsɪpjʊə/, is the brightest star in the constellation of Leo Minor. It is of spectral class K0+III-IV and of magnitude 3.83. It is a red clump giant. Based upon parallax measurements, its distance from the Sun is approximately 99.1 light-years. It is a suspected variable with an amplitude of about 0.05 magnitudes.

== Nomenclature ==
46 Leonis Minoris is the star's Flamsteed designation. It is sometimes designated "o LMi" (not "ο LMi"), from Bode's catalogue of 1801. It was presumably intended to be designated α, as Francis Baily decided to letter each star brighter than magnitude 4.5, but the designation was missing from his catalogue, even though the dimmer β was included.

It bore the traditional proper name Praecipua, derived from the Latin for "the Chief (Star of Leo Minor)". The name may originally have referred to 37 Leonis Minoris, and later mistakenly transferred to this star. In 2016, the International Astronomical Union (IAU) organized a Working Group on Star Names (WGSN) to catalog and standardize proper names for stars. The WGSN approved the name Praecipua for this star on 30 June 2017 and it is now so included in the List of IAU-approved Star Names.

It is known as 勢四, "the Fourth (Star) of the Eunuch", in traditional Chinese astronomy.

== See also ==
- Chinese star names
