= NGC 3327 =

Spiral galaxy

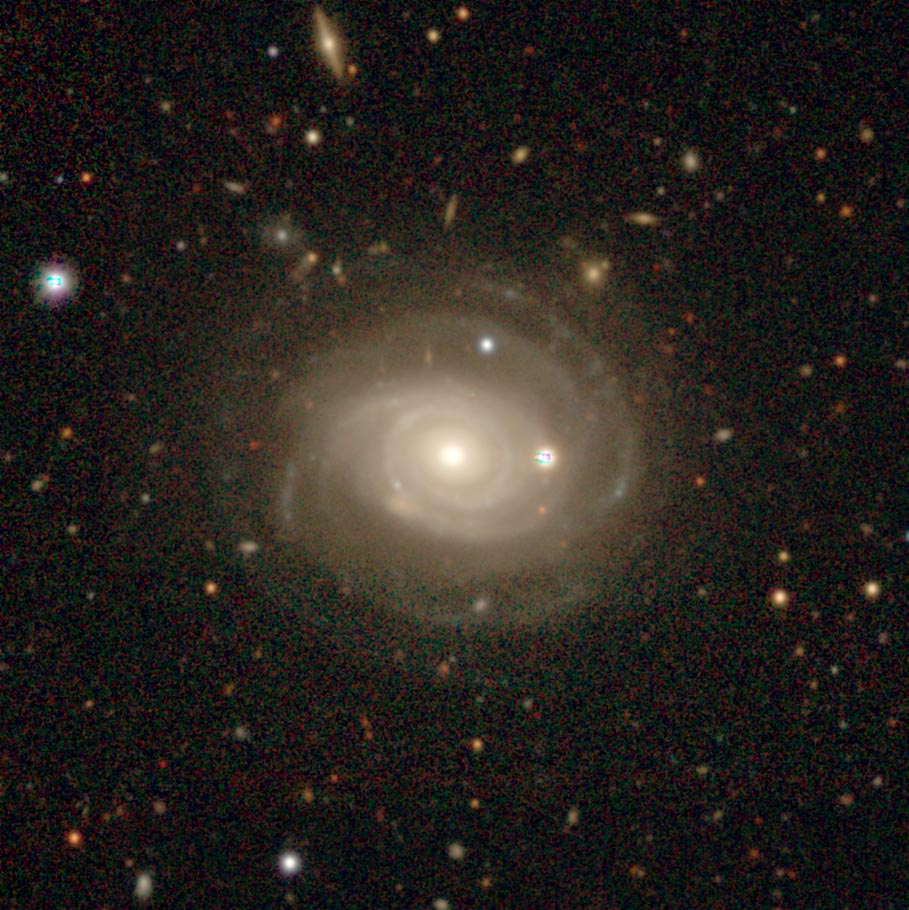

Observation data
- Constellation: Leo Minor
- Right ascension: 10^{h} 41^{m} 22^{s}
- Declination: +23° 57′ 22″
- Distance: 2,860,000,000
- Apparent magnitude (V): 14.2

Characteristics
- Apparent size (V): 1.26' x 0.86'

Other designations
- PGC 31729, UGC 5803

NGC 3327 is a spiral galaxy located in Leo Minor. According to galaxy morphological classification it is classified as a type SAb galaxy. It was discovered by William Herschel on the 10th of April, 1785. He described it as "very faint, small, round, gradually brighter middle, very small (faint) star attached."

== Supernova ==
One supernova has been observed in NGC 3327.

- SN 2001N (Type Ia, mag. 16.3) was discovered by R. Chornock and LOTOSS (Lick Observatory and Tenagra Observatory Supernova Searches) on 21 January 2001.
