= NGC 3430 =

Galaxy in the constellation Leo Minor

- NGC 3430 imaged by the Hubble Space Telescope

Observation data (J2000 epoch)
- Constellation: Leo Minor
- Right ascension: 10^{h} 52^{m} 11.3833^{s}
- Declination: +32° 57′ 01.358″
- Redshift: 0.005290
- Heliocentric radial velocity: 1586 ± 1 km/s
- Distance: 89.9 ± 6.4 Mly (27.57 ± 1.95 Mpc)
- Group or cluster: NGC 3396 Group (LGG 218)
- Apparent magnitude (V): 11.6

Characteristics
- Type: SAB(rs)c
- Size: ~112,500 ly (34.50 kpc) (estimated)
- Apparent size (V): 4.1′ × 2.2′

Other designations
- IRAS 10494+3312, 2MASX J10521141+3257015, UGC 5982, MCG +06-24-026, PGC 32614

NGC 3430 is a barred spiral galaxy in the constellation of Leo Minor. Its velocity with respect to the cosmic microwave background is 1,869 ± 20 km/s, which corresponds to a Hubble distance of 89.9 ± 6.4 Mly (27.57 ± 1.95 Mpc). In addition, 22 non-redshift measurements give a distance of 85.97 ± 3.77 Mly (26.359 ± 1.157 Mpc). It was discovered by German-British astronomer William Herschel on 7 December 1785.

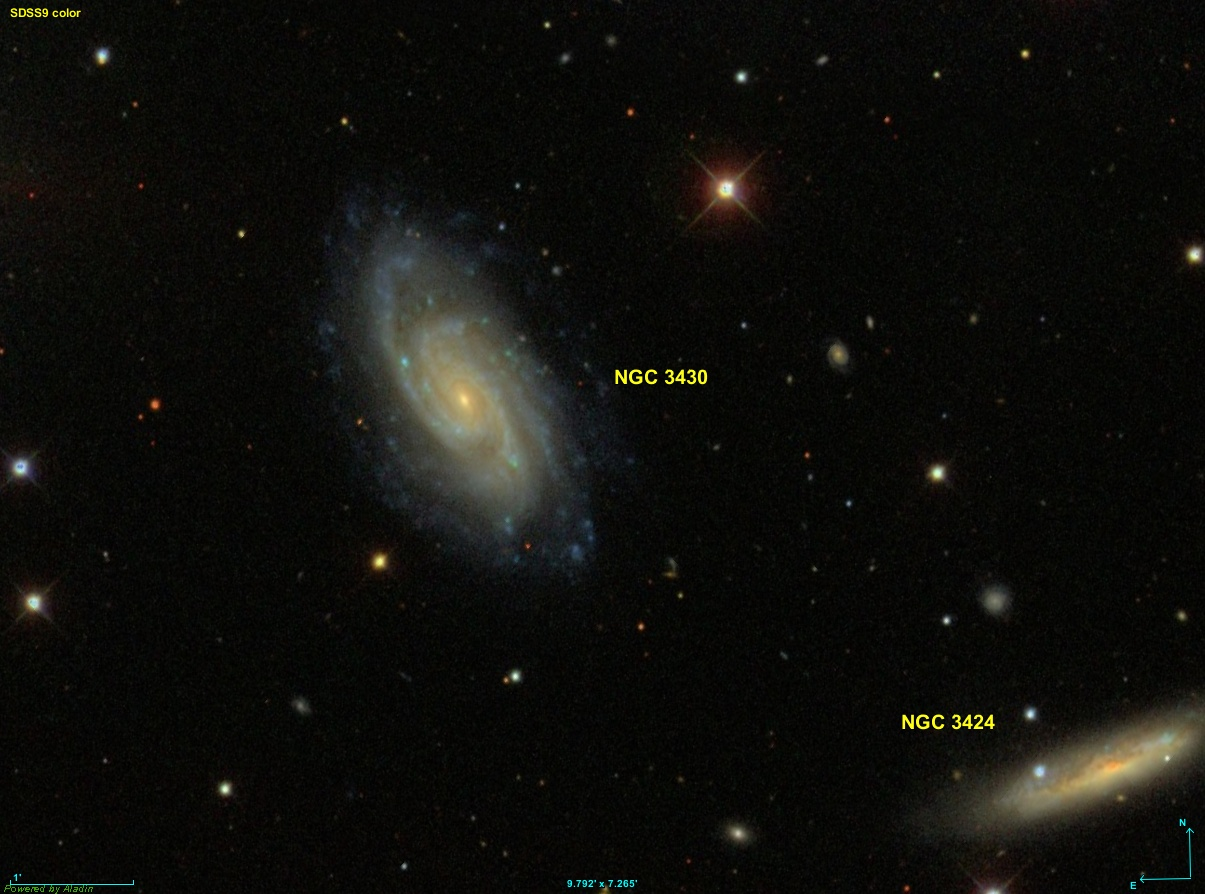
NGC 3430 and NGC 3424 imaged by SDSS

NGC 3430 is classified as a well-known example of an SAc spiral galaxy with no central bar structure but has spiral arms found open and clear-defined. Moreover, it is also a Wolf-Rayet galaxy, with star-forming regions and forms a pair with NGC 3424, a nearby starburst galaxy. According to a 1997 study presented by researchers, these galaxies are clearly showing signs of tidal interaction.

== NGC 3396 Group ==
NGC 3430 is a member of the NGC 3396 group (also known as LGG 218), which includes at least 11 galaxies: NGC 3381, NGC 3395, NGC 3396, NGC 3424, NGC 3442, IC 2604, UGC 5898, PGC 32631, UGC 5934, and UGC 5990.

== Supernovae ==
Two supernovae have been observed in NGC 3936:

- SN 2004ez (Type II, mag. 17.3) was discovered by Kōichi Itagaki on 15 October 2004.
- PSN J10520833+3256394 (Type IIb, mag. 17.8) was discovered by Kōichi Itagaki on 27 August 2015.

== See also ==
- List of NGC objects (3001–4000)
