= 4C 39.32 =

Galaxy in the constellation Leo Minor

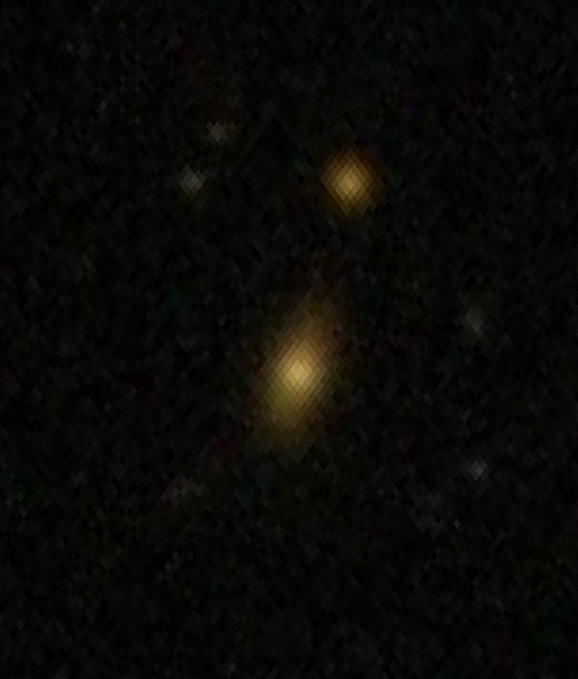
- SDSS image of 4C 39.32

Observation data (J2000.0 epoch)
- Constellation: Leo Minor
- Right ascension: 10^{h} 28^{m} 44.27^{s}
- Declination: +38° 44′ 36.89″
- Redshift: 0.362162
- Heliocentric radial velocity: 108,574 km/s
- Distance: 5.231 Gly (1603.87 Mpc)
- Apparent magnitude (B): 18.4

Characteristics
- Type: Radio galaxy LEG?
- Size: ~305,500 ly (93.68 kpc) (estimated)

Other designations
- 2MASS J10284427+3844369, 6C 1025+39, 87GB 102547.9+390008, B2 1025+390B, LEDA 2820609, IVS B1025+389, PS 150, RX J1028.7+3844

4C 39.32 also known as B2 1025+29B, is an elliptical galaxy with an active galactic nucleus (AGN) located in the constellation of Leo Minor. The redshift of the galaxy is (z) 0.36 and it was first discovered as extragalactic radio source by astronomers in October 1982. It has also been classified as a compact steep spectrum (CSS) source.

== Description ==
4C 39.32 has been categorized as a radio galaxy of low excitation. The source of this galaxy is found to be both compact and also complex with a flat radio spectrum at high frequencies when observed with Very Large Array (VLA). Its central bright radio core is found well resolved, dominating the entire source spectrum. There is presence of radio emission found as having an amorphous appearance and is extended. A hotspot is suggested to be located in the southern component. An extended structure is shown surrounding the main source components based on multi-frequency imaging observations made with VLA. The total radio luminosity of the source at 1.4 GHz, is found to be 0.27 × 10^{27} W Hz^{−1}.

A study has found 4C 39.32 contains a radio jet with the jet trail located in the northwest direction that is found to coincide with an ultraviolet knot feature, located by around five kiloparsecs from the core region. This alignment hints that the stellar populations in the knot directly in the jet's direction are caused by shock-trigged star formations. The estimated young stellar population the galaxy is suggested to be between 0.06 and 0.1 years old, while the old stellar population is around less than 5 million years old. The host galaxy is described to have a flat bulge structure with an effective radius of 3.5 kiloparsecs and an elliptical component on the outer side. The nuclear point source of the galaxy has been depicted as relatively fainter compared to the bulge. The supermassive black hole lying in the center of the galaxy has been estimated to be around 9.15 ± 1.37 M_{☉}. The neon emission lines in its spectrum has been found to have a flux of 0.05 ± 0.05 × 10^{−15} erg s^{−1}.
