= HD 93963 =

Star system in the constellation of Leo Minor

Observation data Epoch J2000 Equinox ICRS
- Constellation: Leo Minor
- A
- Right ascension: 10^{h} 51^{m} 06.5137^{s}
- Declination: +25° 38′ 28.189″
- Apparent magnitude (V): +9.18±0.02
- B
- Right ascension: 10^{h} 51^{m} 06.8665^{s}
- Declination: +25° 38′ 24.800″

Characteristics

A
- Evolutionary stage: main sequence
- Spectral type: G0V

B
- Evolutionary stage: main sequence
- Spectral type: M5 V
- Apparent magnitude (G): 16.9

Astrometry

A
| Radial velocity (R_{v}) | +13.37±0.16 km/s |
| Proper motion (μ) | RA: −92.833 mas/yr Dec.: −22.911 mas/yr |
| Parallax (π) | 12.1506±0.0171 mas |
| Distance | 268.4 ± 0.4 ly (82.3 ± 0.1 pc) |

B
| Proper motion (μ) | RA: −90.705 mas/yr Dec.: −22.993 mas/yr |
| Parallax (π) | 11.9396±0.1276 mas |
| Distance | 273 ± 3 ly (83.8 ± 0.9 pc) |

Details

A
| Mass | 1.109±0.043 M_{☉} |
| Radius | 1.043±0.009 R_{☉} |
| Luminosity | 1.254±0.058 L_{☉} |
| Surface gravity (log g) | 4.49±0.11 cgs |
| Temperature | 5,987±64 K |
| Metallicity [Fe/H] | +0.10±0.04 dex |
| Rotation | 12.8±1.8 days |
| Rotational velocity (v sin i) | 5.9±0.8 km/s |
| Age | 1.4+0.8 −0.4 Gyr |

B
| Mass | 0.162 M_{☉} |
| Radius | 0.196 R_{☉} |
| Temperature | 3,090 K |

Other designations
- HD 93963, WDS J10511+2538, TOI-1797

Database references
| SIMBAD | HD 93963 A |
- HD 93963 B

HD 93963 is a binary star in the constellation Leo Minor. At an apparent magnitude of +9.18, it is not visible to the naked eye. Parallax measurements give a distance of 268 light-years (82.3 parsecs) and 273 light-years (83.8 parsecs) for the primary and secondary component, respectively. Interstellar extinction causes the system's magnitude to be reduced by 0.10±0.05 magnitudes.

== Characteristics ==
The primary, HD 93963 A, is main sequence star of class G0V. The star has a mass 1.11 times that of the Sun and a radius 1.043 times solar. It irradiates 25% more luminosity than the Sun and has an effective temperature of 5,987 K, giving it a yellowish-white hue as typical of G-type stars.

The companion, HD 93963 B, is a red dwarf star of class M5V. The star has 0.16 times the mass and 0.20 times the radius of the Sun, with a cool effective temperature of 3,060 K. It has a projected separation of 484 au from the primary.

== Planetary system ==
Two planets have been discovered around the primary star in 2022 with the joint use of transit photometry and radial velocity.

- HD 93963 A b is a super-Earth with an orbital period of 1.04 days. It orbits at a semi-major axis of 0.0209 AU and shows an inclination of 86.21 degrees. The planet has a radius of 1.35±0.042 Earth radii. Its mass estimate sits at 7.8±3.2 Earth masses.
- HD 93963 A c is a sub-Neptune planet that completes an orbit every 3.65 days. Its radius measures 3.228±0.059 Earth radii and its mass measures 19.2±4.1 Earth masses.
