= SDSS J105054.22+225651.0 =

Radio galaxy in the constellation Leo Minor

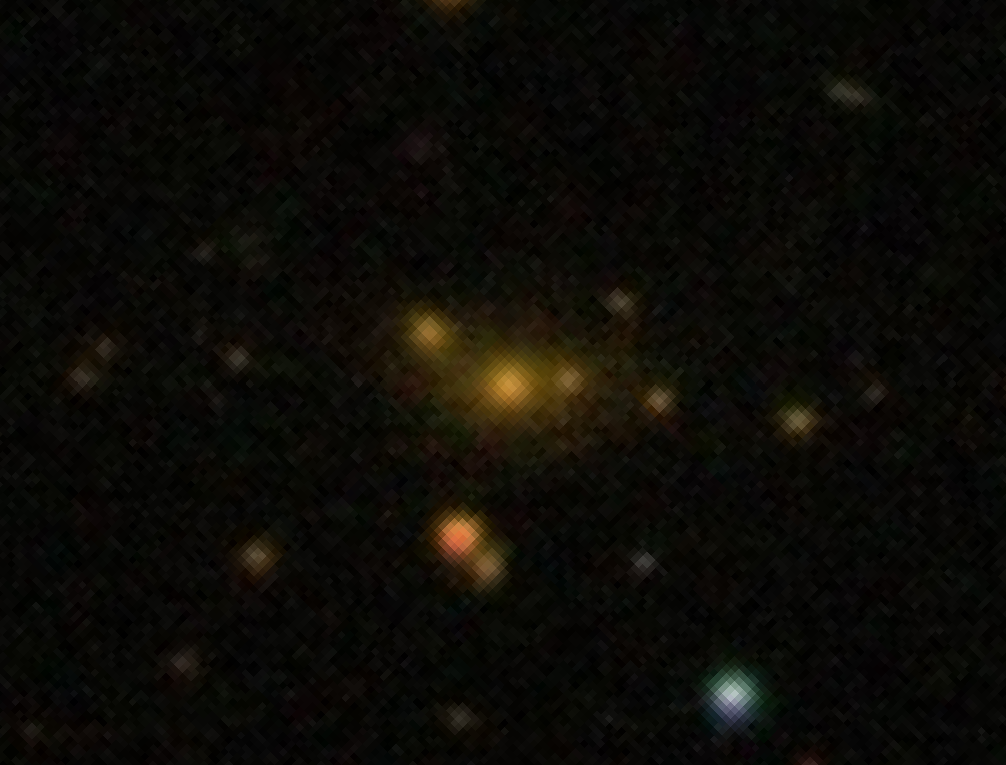
- SDSS image of SDSS J105054.22+225651.0

Observation data (J2000.0 epoch)
- Constellation: Leo Minor
- Right ascension: 10^{h} 50^{m} 54.24^{s}
- Declination: +22° 56′ 51.16″
- Redshift: 0.344363
- Heliocentric radial velocity: 103,558 ± 29 km/s
- Distance: 4,981.7 ± 348.7 Mly (1,527.40 ± 106.92 Mpc)
- Group or cluster: WHL J105054.2+225651
- magnitude (J): 14.92
- magnitude (H): 14.59

Characteristics
- Type: BrClG
- Size: ~794,000 ly (243.5 kpc) (estimated)

Other designations
- 2MASX J10505421+2256510, GMBCG J162.72596+22.94748 BCG, LEDA 1678798, [LHC2018] J162.72597+22.94749, NVSS J105054+225652, WHL J105054.2+225651 BCG, [YHW2016] J162.72597+22.94749

SDSS J105054.22+225651.0 also known as [LHC2018] J162.72597+22.94749, is a radio galaxy located in the constellation of Leo Minor. The redshift of the galaxy is estimated to be located at (z) 0.344.

== Description ==
SDSS J105054.22+225651.0 is an elliptical galaxy residing as the brightest cluster galaxy of the WHL J105054.2+225651 galaxy cluster with 30 confirmed galaxy member candidates, but not affiliated with any of the superclusters. The R-band magnitude of the galaxy is 17.71 while its absolute magnitude is -23.73.

The central nucleus is active and it has been categorized as a Fanaroff-Riley Class Type I radio galaxy with its flux density measured as 15.00 mJy by NRAO VLA Sky Survey (NVSS). The radio morphology is elongated and described as a single elliptical profile component although it can also be stated as having a compact radio morphology, depicted as a single point-like component. A radio core is present with its total core flux density being calculated as 13.47 mJy while the radio emission flux density is 14.90 mJy. The luminosity distance of the source is 1839.3 megaparsecs whereas the radio power is 6.09 × 10^{24} WHz^{−1}.

A study found the total stellar mass of the galaxy is 11.51 M_{☉}. The log radio luminosity is 24.75 W Hz^{−1} whereas the radio flux density at 1.4 GHz frequencies is 15.0 mJy. The rest-frame r^{0.1} magnitude is -23.21. Evidence found the galaxy is mainly powered by its active galactic nucleus.
