= AGC 198691 =

Galaxy in the constellation Leo Minor

Observation data (J2000 epoch)
- Constellation: Leo Minor
- Right ascension: 09^{h} 43^{m} 32.43^{s}
- Declination: +33° 26′ 58″
- Distance: 41.4+5.5 −11.1 Mly (12.7+1.7 −3.4 Mpc)

Characteristics
- Type: dG
- Mass: 10×10^{6} M_{☉}
- Apparent size (V): 3 × 4 arcsec

Other designations
- Leoncino

AGC 198691 is a small galaxy with one of the smallest known metallicities. It has a nickname of Leoncino as it is near Leo Minor. The galaxy appears blue due to the presence of several bright blue stars. There is also an HII region present that contains oxygen. It is important as an indicator of the kind of galaxies first formed in the Universe.
