= NGC 3003 =

Galaxy in the constellation Leo Minor

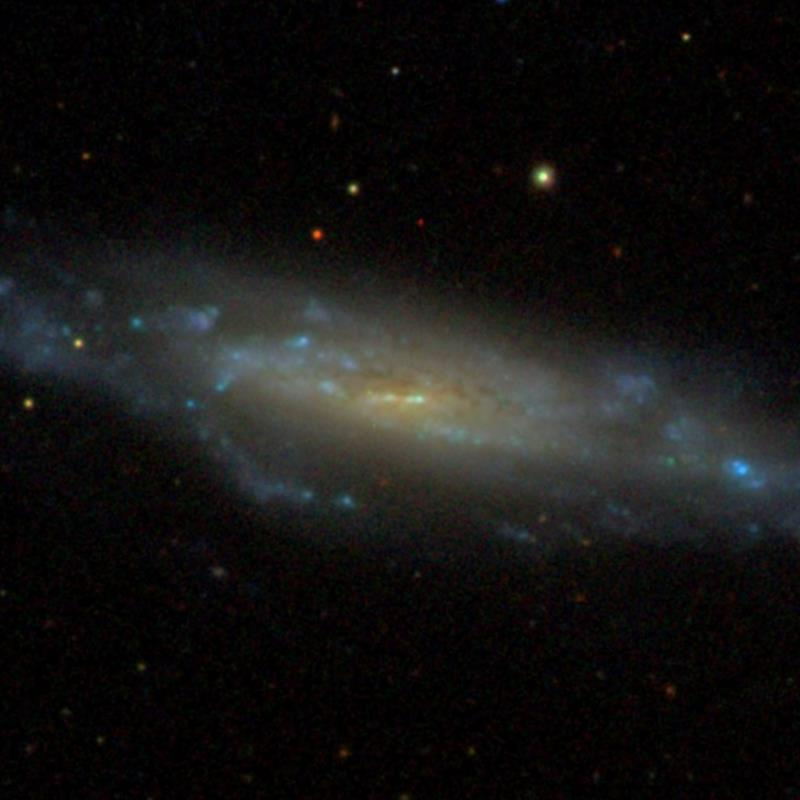
- SDSS image of NGC 3003

Observation data (J2000 epoch)
- Constellation: Leo Minor
- Right ascension: 09^{h} 48^{m} 35.580^{s}
- Declination: +33° 25′ 17.83″
- Redshift: 0.004930
- Heliocentric radial velocity: 1,474 km/s
- Distance: 63.6 Mly (19.50 Mpc)
- Apparent magnitude (V): 11.78
- Apparent magnitude (B): 12.25

Characteristics
- Type: SBbc
- Apparent size (V): 5.7′ × 1.4′

Other designations
- UGC 5251, MCG +06-22-013, PGC 28186

NGC 3003 is a nearly edge-on barred spiral galaxy in the constellation of Leo Minor, discovered by German-British astronomer William Herschel on December 7, 1785. It has an apparent visual magnitude of 11.78, and spans an angular size of 5.7′ × 1.4′. NGC 3003 is located at a distance of 19.5 Mpc from the Sun, with a recessional velocity of 1,474 km/s.

The morphological classification of NGC 3003 is SBbc, indicating a barred spiral (SB) with moderate to loosely wound spiral arms (bc). The shape of the galaxy suggests it has been disturbed, possibly by NGC 3021. The two have a projected separation of about 200 kpc. NGC 3003 displays high luminosity in the hydrogen-alpha line, showing a bright nucleus and many prominent H II regions. 25 independent star forming regions have been identified, including the nuclear region. There is a bright and compact region to the southwest, which may be the remains of a dwarf galaxy or an intense H II region.

== Supernova and luminous blue variable ==
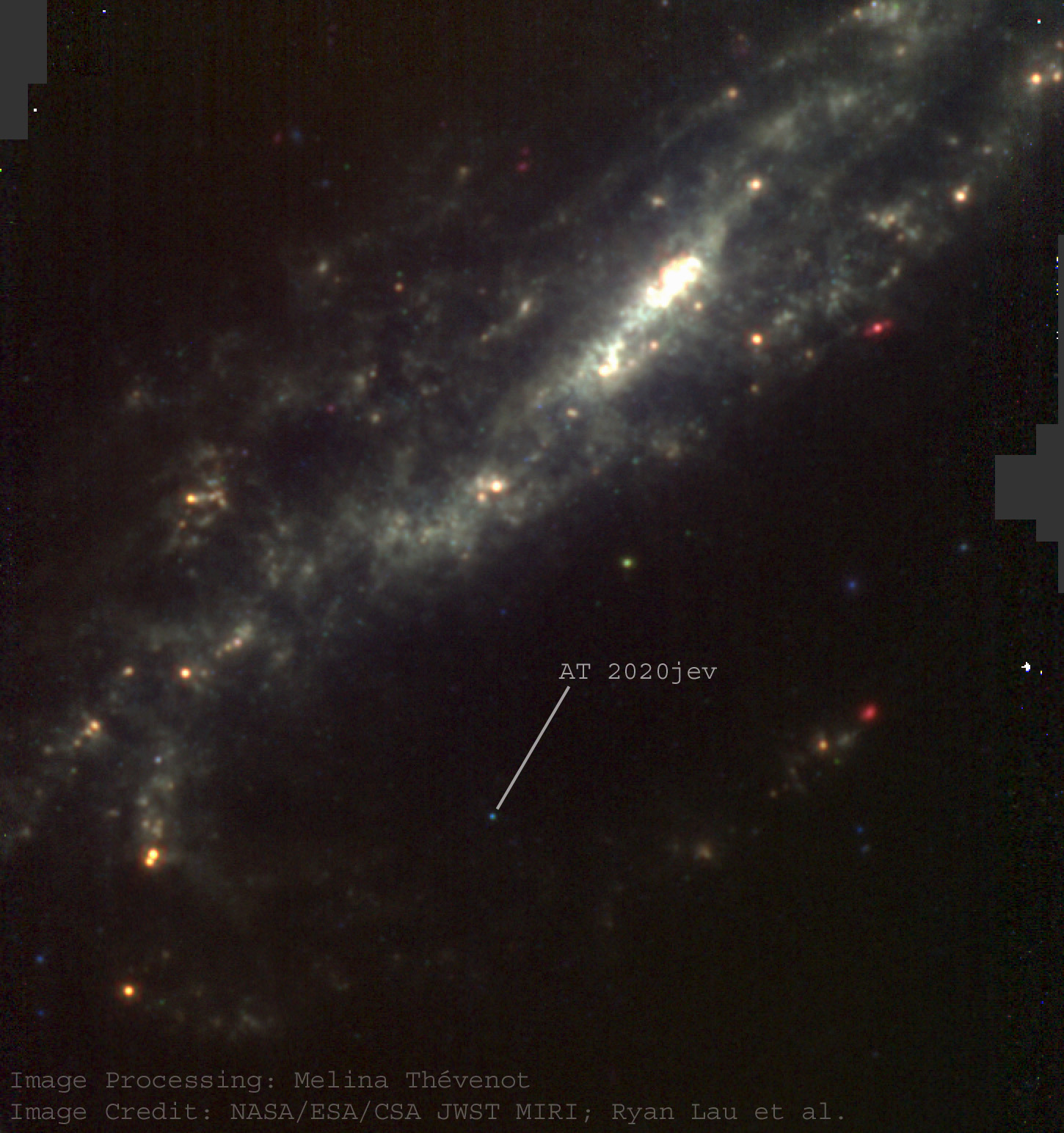
AT 2020jev imaged by the James Webb Space Telescope

One supernova and one luminous blue variable have been observed in NGC 3003:

- SN 1961F (Type II, mag. 13.1) was discovered by Paul Wild on 21 February 1961.
- AT 2020jev (Type LBV, mag. 20.33) was discovered by Pan-STARRS on 4 May 2020.
