= Abell 1033 =

Galaxy cluster

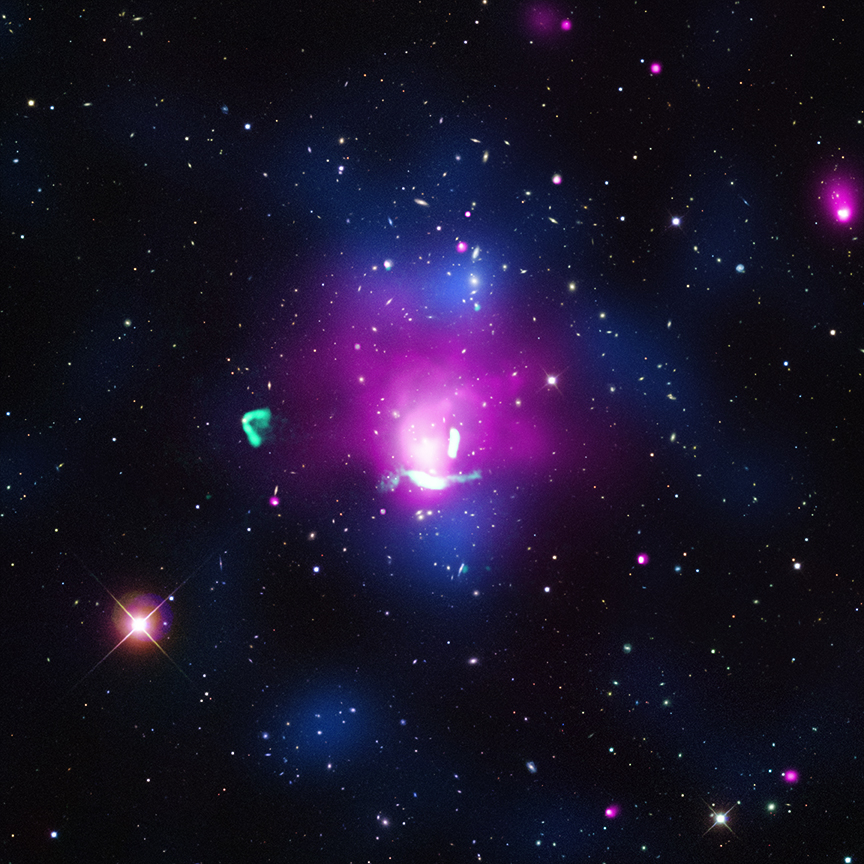
- Composite image of Abell 1033
- Object type: Galaxy cluster
- Other designations: RBS 879, 1RXS J103143.9+350312, RX J1031.7+3503, MCXC J1031.7+3502, [SPD2011] 2202, [RRB2014] RM J103144.3+350229.0, PSZ2 G189.31+59.24

Observation data (Epoch J2000)
- Constellation: Leo Minor
- Right ascension: 10^{h} 31^{m} 33.7^{s}
- Declination: +35° 04′ 34″
- Redshift: 0.1259
- Notable features: Bautz–Morgan classification: III

Abell 1033 is a galaxy cluster located in the constellation Leo Minor, approximately 1.6 billion light-years from Earth. It contains about 350 galaxies.

The cluster has been studied across various wavelengths of the electromagnetic spectrum, including X-ray observations by the Chandra X-ray Observatory. These observations revealed significant radio emission associated with the cluster.

It is believed that the supermassive black hole at the center of Abell 1033 once emitted jets of high-energy electrons that propagated into intergalactic space. Over time, these emissions faded as the electrons lost energy and the cloud dispersed. However, a subsequent collision between Abell 1033 and another cluster likely generated a shock wave that re-energized the electrons, resulting in renewed bright radio emission. This "rebirth" may have occurred relatively recently in astronomical terms, possibly within the past few tens of millions of years.

An Italian-led study conducted at low radio frequencies, using data from the European LOFAR (Low Frequency Array) and the Indian Giant Metrewave Radio Telescope (GMRT), detected unusually bright clouds of relativistic particles.

== See also ==
- Galaxy groups and clusters
- Abell catalogue
- Supermassive black hole
