= RZ Leonis Minoris =

Variable star in the constellation Leo Minor

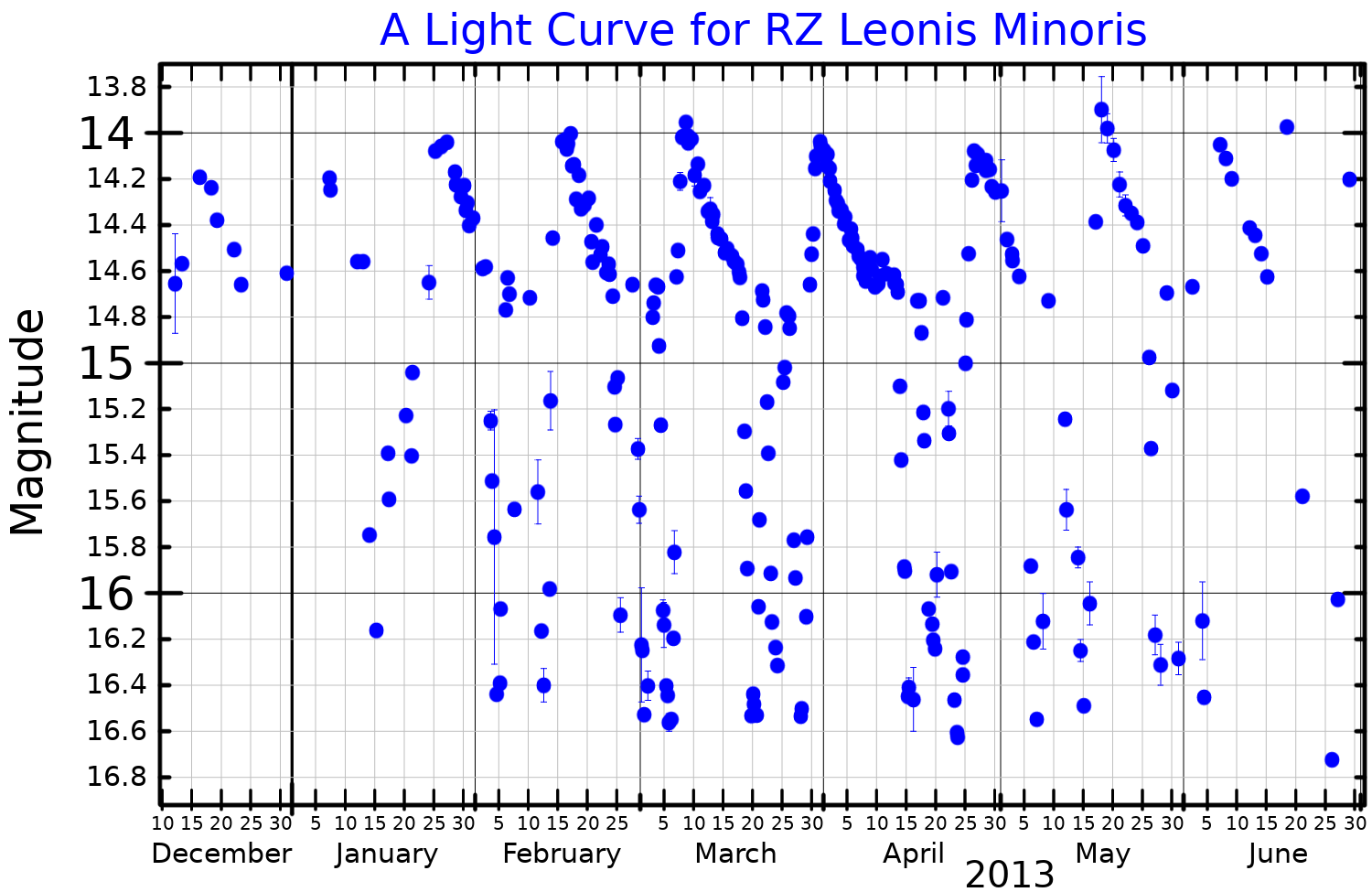
- A light curve for RZ Leonis Minoris, adapted from Kato et al. (2016)

Observation data Epoch J2000.0 Equinox J2000.0
- Constellation: Leo Minor
- Right ascension: 09^{h} 51^{m} 48.926^{s}
- Declination: 34° 07′ 23.97″
- Apparent magnitude (V): 14.4 to 16.8

Characteristics
- Variable type: Nova-like

Astrometry
Proper motion (μ)	RA: −4.848 mas/yr Dec.: −22.151 mas/yr
Parallax (π)	1.5127±0.0335 mas
Distance	2,160 ± 50 ly (660 ± 10 pc)

Other designations
- RZ LMi, SDSS J095148.93+340723.8

Database references
SIMBAD	data

RZ Leonis Minoris is a cataclysmic variable star system in the northern constellation of Leo Minor. It undergoes frequent outbursts that vary in brightness from an apparent visual magnitude of 14.4 down to 16.8. Based on parallax measurements, this system is located at a distance of approximately 2,160 light years from the Sun.

This system became an object of interest in 1981 when V. A. Lipovetsky and J. A. Stepanian showed it to be a variable star with an ultraviolet excess. It shows strong variation from magnitude 14 down to 17, and the energy distribution at maximum resembles an OB star. The system displays a cyclical light curve, for which J. W. Robertson and colleagues in 1993 found a stable period of 19.2 days. The object differs from most dwarf novae by displaying short-term brightening and fading.

The behavior of the system is similar to ER Ursae Majoris, showing superoutbursts and superhumps. This indicates that RZ LMi is a SU Ursae Majoris-type dwarf novae belonging to the ER UMa sub-class. None of the variation can be linked to the orbital period of this binary system, and thus there is little known about the individual components. The high activity level of this object and the stability of the 19-day supercycle may indicate there is a third body in the system.
