= SX Leonis Minoris =

Star in the constellation of Leo Minor

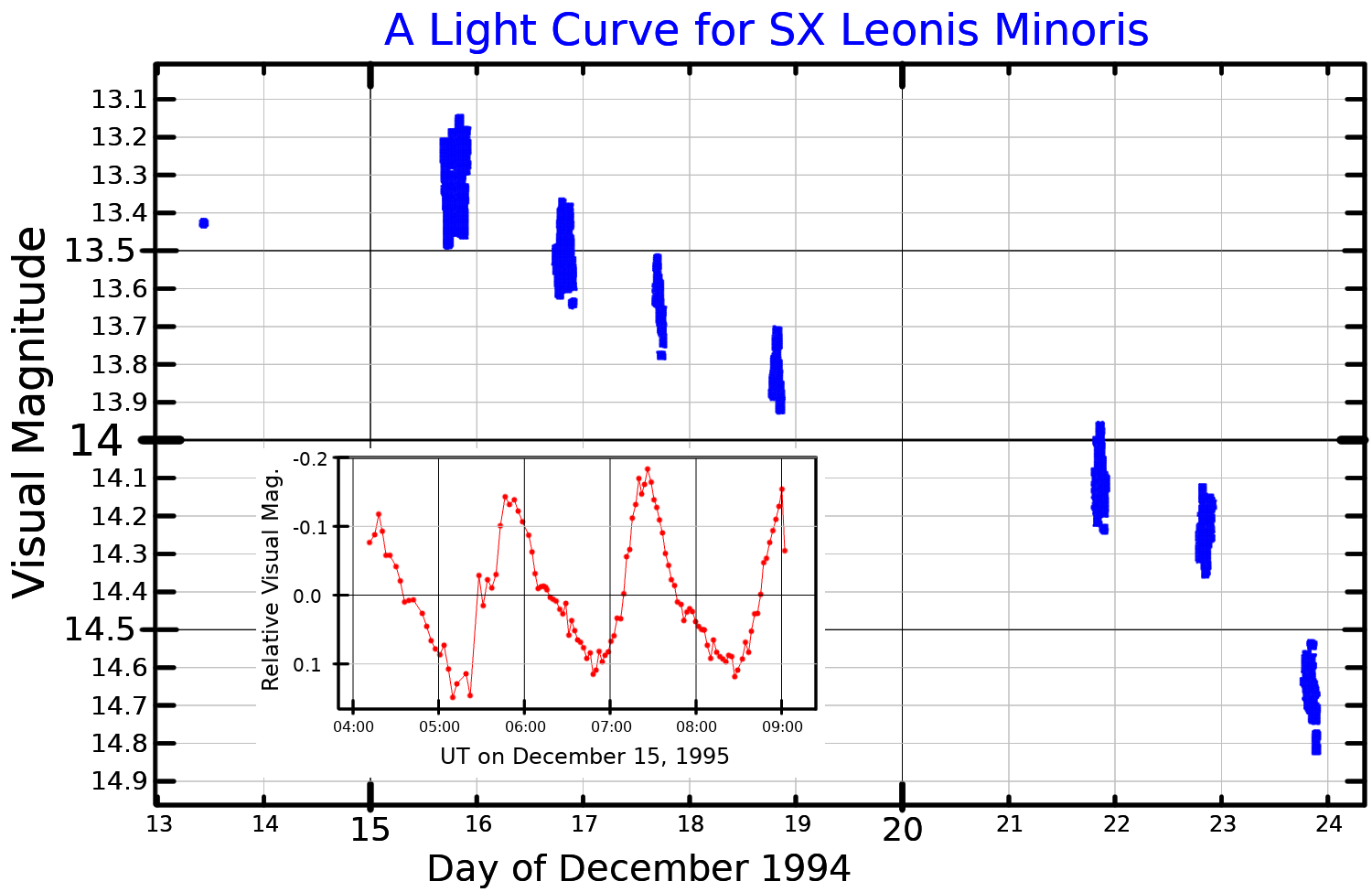
- A visual band light curve for SX Leonis Minoris, adapted from Nogami et al. (1997). The main plot shows the outburst in late 1994, and the inset plot shows the superhump variations.

Observation data Epoch J2000 Equinox J2000
- Constellation: Leo Minor
- Right ascension: 10^{h} 54^{m} 32.42^{s}
- Declination: +30° 06′ 10.2″

Characteristics
- Spectral type: CV

Other designations
- SX Leonis Minoris, CBS-31

Database references
SIMBAD	data

SX Leonis Minoris is a dwarf nova of the SU Ursae Majoris type that was first discovered as a 16th magnitude blue star in 1957, before its identity was confirmed as a dwarf nova in 1994. The system consists of a white dwarf and a donor star which orbit around a common centre of gravity every 97 minutes. The white dwarf sucks matter from the other star via its Roche lobe onto an accretion disc which is heated to between 6000 and 10000 K and periodically erupts every 34 to 64 days, reaching magnitude 13.4 in these outbursts and remaining at magnitude 16.8 when quiet. These outbursts can be split into frequent eruptions and less frequent supereruptions. The former are smooth, while the latter exhibit short "superhumps" of heightened activity and last 2.6% longer.

SX Leonis Minoris has been calculated as lying 489 to 688 light years (150 to 211 parsecs) distant from the Solar System via extrapolation of the, or more recently as 360 parsecs (1174 light years) via calculation using orbital period and absolute magnitude. The donor star has been calculated to have only 11% the mass of the white dwarf. It is thought to be a red dwarf of spectral type M5 to M7, but infrared observation or spectroscopy is obscured by the white dwarf's accretion disc.
