= NGC 3486 =

Galaxy in the constellation Leo Minor

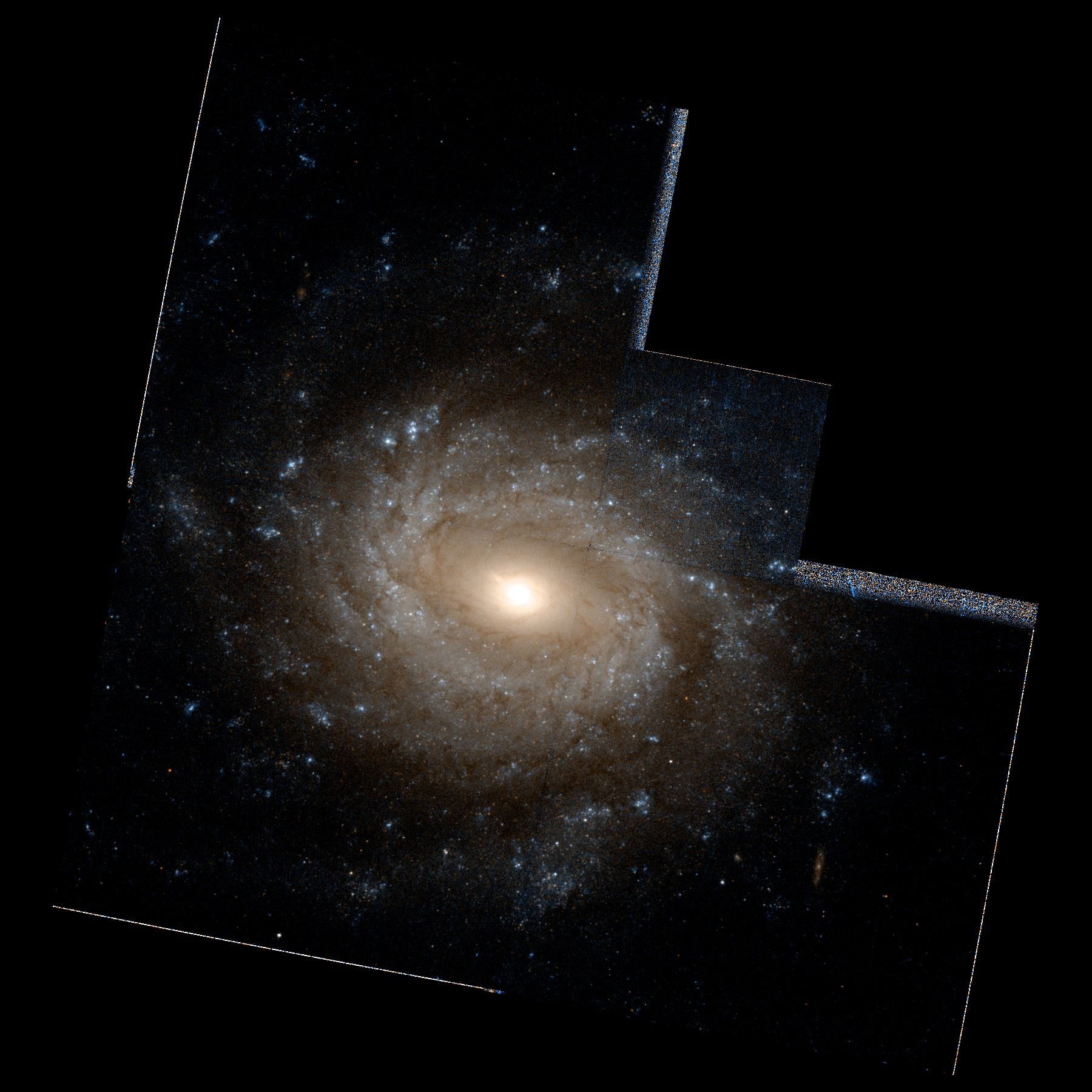
- NGC 3486 (Hubble Space Telescope)

Observation data (J2000 epoch)
- Constellation: Leo Minor
- Right ascension: 11^{h} 00^{m} 23.946^{s}
- Declination: +28° 58′ 29.35″
- Redshift: +0.004113 ± 0.000003
- Heliocentric radial velocity: +681 km/s
- Distance: 27.4 Mly (8.41 Mpc)
- Apparent magnitude (V): 10.3

Characteristics
- Type: SAB(r)c
- Apparent size (V): 7.1′ × 5.2′

Other designations
- UGC 6079

NGC 3486 is an intermediate barred spiral galaxy located about 27.4 million light years away in the constellation of Leo Minor. It has a morphological classification of SAB(r)c, which indicates it is a weakly barred spiral with an inner ring and loosely wound arms. This is a borderline, low-luminosity Seyfert galaxy with an active nucleus. However, no radio or X-ray emission has been detected from the core, and it may only have a small supermassive black hole with less than a million times the mass of the Sun.
