= Beta Leonis Minoris =

Star in the constellation of Leo Minor

β Leonis Minoris
- Location of Beta Leonis Minoris (circled)

Observation data Epoch J2000 Equinox ICRS
- Constellation: Leo Minor
- Right ascension: 10^{h} 27^{m} 53.000^{s}
- Declination: +36° 42′ 25.96″
- Apparent magnitude (V): 4.21 (4.40/6.12)

Characteristics
- Evolutionary stage: red clump
- Spectral type: G9III
- U−B color index: +0.64
- B−V color index: +0.90
- R−I color index: +0.46

A
- Spectral type: G8III-IV

B
- Evolutionary stage: subgiant
- Spectral type: F8IV

Astrometry
Radial velocity (R_{v})	8.52 km/s
Proper motion (μ)	RA: −127.68 mas/yr Dec.: −110.31 mas/yr
Parallax (π)	21.19±0.50 mas
Distance	154 ± 4 ly (47 ± 1 pc)
Absolute magnitude (M_{V})	+0.85

Orbit
Period (P)	13,965±40
Semi-major axis (a)	0.3782″±0.0007″
Eccentricity (e)	0.680±0.002
Inclination (i)	81.4±0.1°
Periastron epoch (T)	2451411.1±4.8 JD
Argument of periastron (ω) (secondary)	215.7±0.2°
Semi-amplitude (K_{1}) (primary)	7.93±0.05 km/s
Semi-amplitude (K_{2}) (secondary)	12.32±0.18 km/s

Details

A
Mass	2.98±0.10 M_{☉}
Radius	9.4±0.3 R_{☉}
Luminosity (bolometric)	50.7±1.8 L_{☉}
Surface gravity (log g)	2.85 cgs
Temperature	5,299±63 K
Metallicity [Fe/H]	+0.09 dex
Rotational velocity (v sin i)	2.54 km/s
Age	1.2 Gyr

B
Mass	1.92±0.04 M_{☉}
Radius	2.0 R_{☉}
Luminosity (bolometric)	17.6 L_{☉}
Temperature	5,484 K

Other designations
- Beta Leonis Minoris, Beta LMi, β LMi, Beta LMi, 31 Leonis Minoris, BD+37 2080, FK5 390, GC 14358, HD 90537, HIP 51233, HR 4100, SAO 62053, PPM 75233, ADS 7780, CCDM J10279+3642, WDS 10279+3642

Database references
SIMBAD	data

Beta Leonis Minoris, Latinized from β Leonis Minoris, is a binary star in the northern constellation of Leo Minor. It has an overall apparent visual magnitude of approximately 4.2. Although it is the only star in Leo Minor with a Bayer designation, it is only the second brightest star in the constellation (the brightest is 46 Leonis Minoris), fitting with the term "beta" usually designating the second-brightest star.

== Binary system ==
β Leonis Minoris is a binary that can be resolved for a portion of each orbit. When the two components are too close to resolve, it appears as a single G9 giant star with some indications of a second set of spectral lines. The orbit derived as a double-lined spectroscopic binary is poor, and a better orbit has been calculated using only the spectral lines of the primary, plus input from the known visual observations. The orbital period is nearly 39 years and the eccentricity is high at 0.683. The semi-major axis of the orbit is 0.36″, but the separation varies from 0.1 to 0.6″.

The primary star is a late G-class red clump giant, a star that is fusing helium in its core and lies at the cool end of the horizontal branch. The properties of the secondary star can only be estimated from its relative brightness and its spectral class. It is an F8 subgiant, hotter than the sun and starting to evolve away from the main sequence.
