= R Leonis Minoris =

Variable star in the constellation Leo Minor

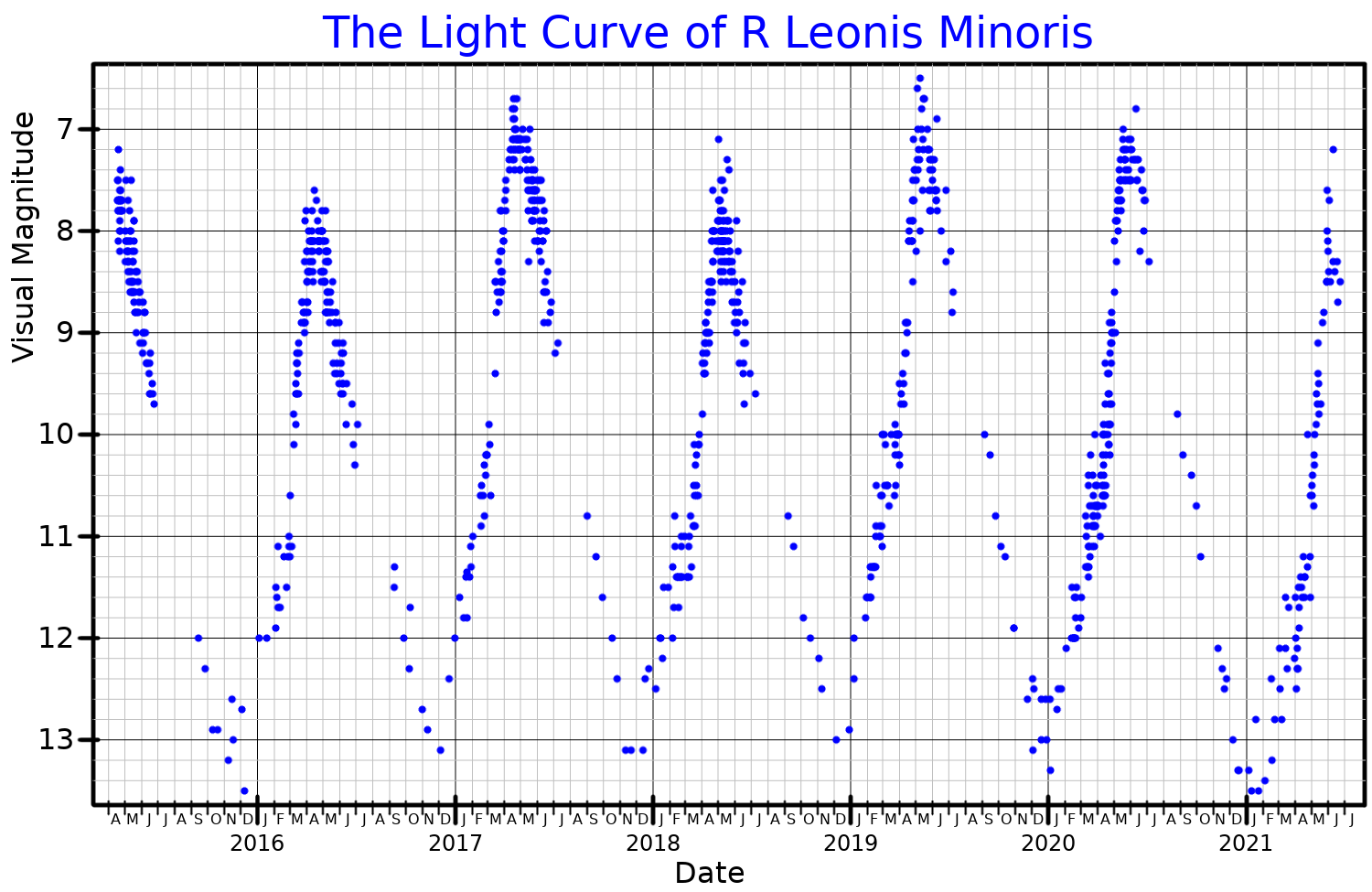
- The visual band light curve of R Leonis Minoris, from AAVSO data

Observation data Epoch J2000 Equinox J2000
- Constellation: Leo Minor
- Right ascension: 09^{h} 45^{m} 34.28405^{s}
- Declination: +34° 30′ 42.8091″
- Apparent magnitude (V): 6.3 – 13.2

Characteristics
- Spectral type: M6.5e to M9.0e (Tc:)
- U−B color index: +0.55
- B−V color index: +1.32
- Variable type: Mira

Astrometry
Radial velocity (R_{v})	−10.00±4.6 km/s
Proper motion (μ)	RA: +1.657 mas/yr Dec.: −1.734 mas/yr
Parallax (π)	3.496±0.142 mas
Distance	930 ± 40 ly (290 ± 10 pc)

Details
Radius	348 – 411 R_{☉}
Luminosity	5,288+348 −327 L_{☉}
Surface gravity (log g)	−0.65 to −0.61 cgs
Temperature	2,730 K

Other designations
- R LMi, HD 84346, HIP 47886, SAO 61669, BD+35° 2050

Database references
SIMBAD	data

R Leonis Minoris (R LMi) is a Mira variable type star in the constellation Leo Minor. It ranges between apparent magnitude 6.3 and 13.2, and spectral types M6.5e to M9.0e (Tc:), over a period of 372 days.
