= Arp 107 =

Interacting galaxy in the constellation Leo Minor

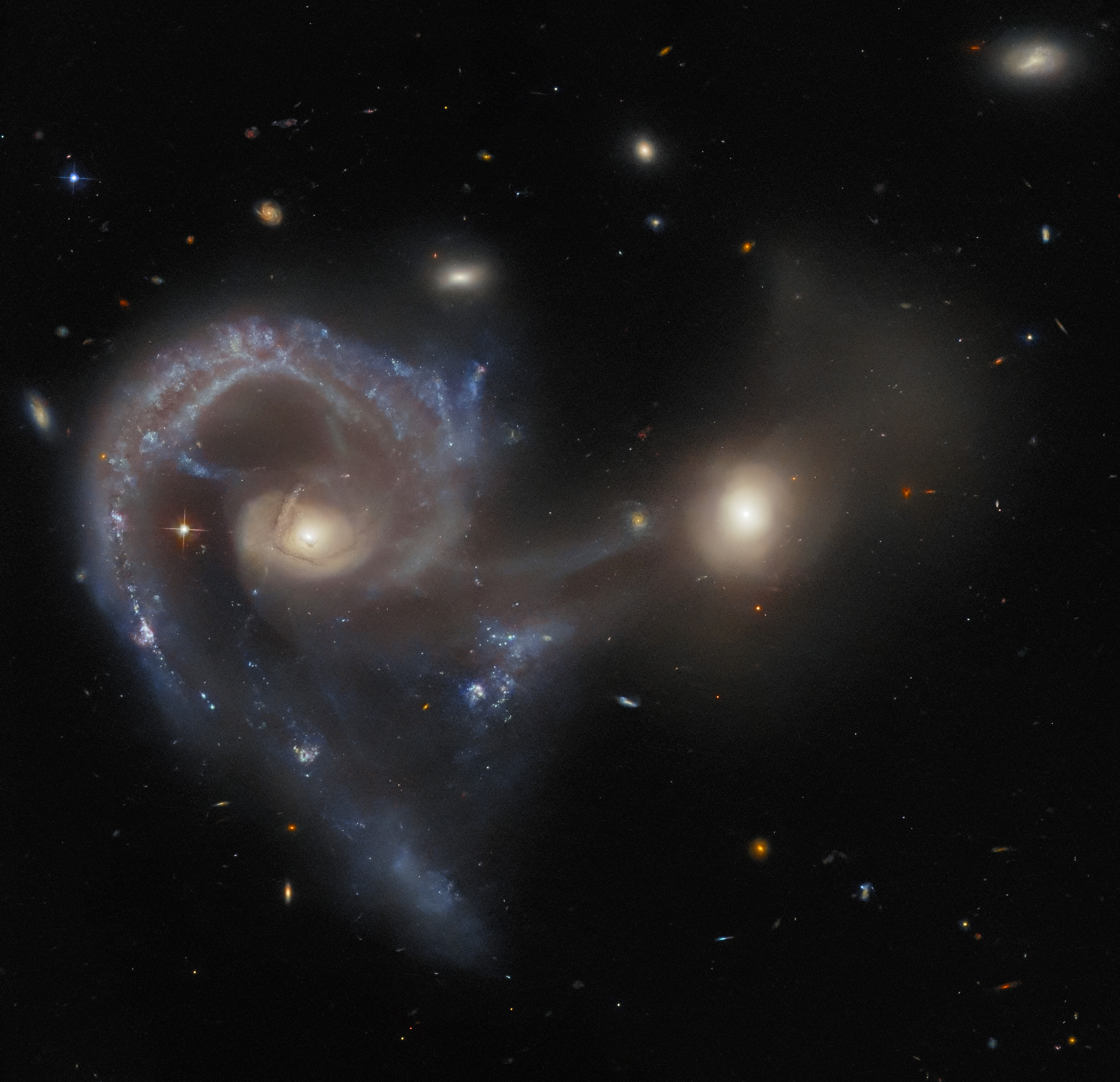
- Arp 107 photograph taken using NASA/ESA Hubble Space Telescope’s Advanced Camera for Surveys

Observation data (J2000.0 epoch)
- Constellation: Leo Minor
- Right ascension: 10^{h} 52^{m} 14.94792^{s}
- Declination: +30° 03′ 28.3630″
- Redshift: 0.03451
- Heliocentric radial velocity: 10167 km/s
- Distance: 450 million ly
- Apparent magnitude (B): 14.6

Characteristics
- Type: SA(s)cP / E1P
- Size: 348,000 ly (PGC 32620), 70,000 ly (PGC 32628)
- Apparent size (V): 1.40' × 0.11' ?
- Notable features: interacting galaxies

Other designations
- UGC 5984, VV 233, PGC 32620/32628

Arp 107 is a pair of interacting galaxies (designated separately as UGC 5984 and MCG+05-26-025) located about 450 million light-years away in the constellation Leo Minor. The galaxies are in the process of colliding and merging.

== Characteristics ==
Arp 107 is made of two separate galaxies. The larger galaxy to the left is PGC 32620, and the smaller galaxy to the right is PGC 32628, (as depicted in the Hubble image). These galaxies are different in which one is a spiral galaxy while the other one is an elliptical galaxy being connected by a bridge and tidal tail made of dust and gas.

The nucleus of PGC 32620 is active and it is classified as a type 2 Seyfert galaxy. Additionally, the galaxy is depicted having a ring-like appearance. The most likely scenario for this appearance in PGC 32620, is that the elliptical galaxy penetrated through its disk, causing it to become semi-annular with a large single spiral arm protruding out. This spiral arm in turn, then branches out in a form of a tidal arm, where star-forming regions of both old and young star populations are present.

== Gallery ==
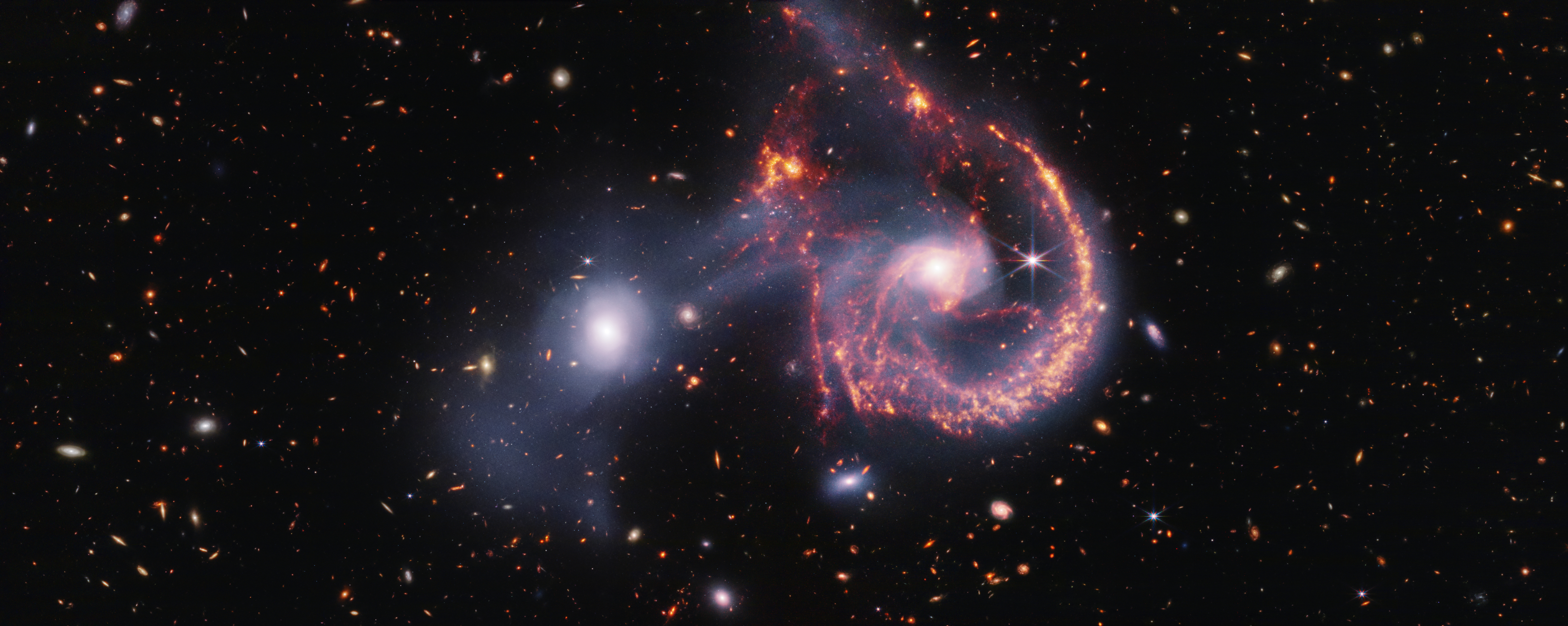
JWST Composite Image of Arp 107

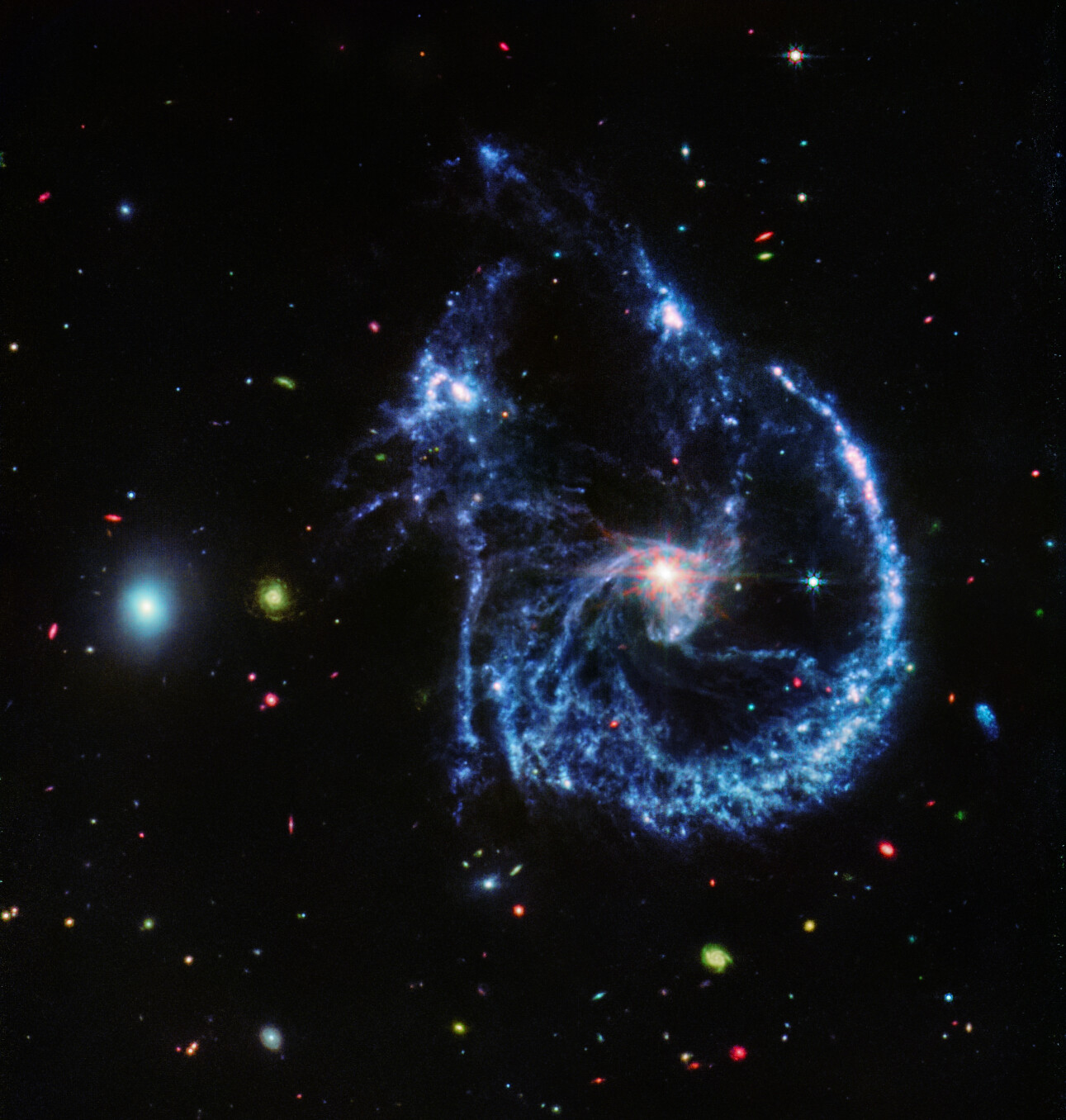
JWST MIRI Image of Arp 107

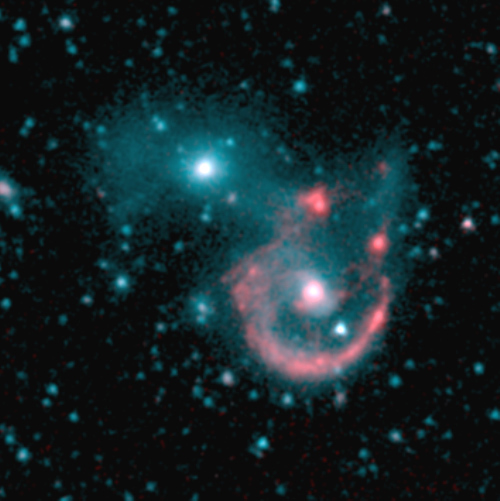
False-color infrared image of Arp 107, from Spitzer Space Telescope

== See also ==
- Antennae Galaxies
- Arp 299
