= 3C 234 =

Galaxy in the constellation Leo Minor

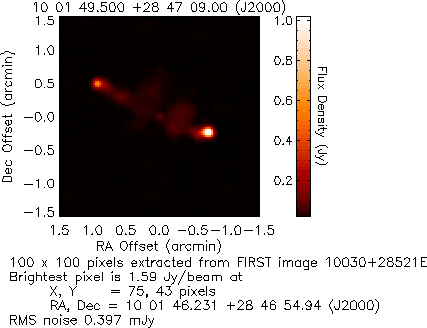

Observation data (Epoch J2000)
- Constellation: Leo Minor
- Right ascension: 10^{h} 01^{m} 49.501^{s}
- Declination: +28° 47′ 08.98″
- Redshift: 0.184925
- Distance: 733 megaparsecs (2.39×10^{9} ly) h^{−1}_{0.73}
- Type: Sy1, Rad, AGN, QSO, IR, G, blu, X, gam G
- Apparent magnitude (V): 17.27

Other designations
- DA 280, LEDA 139234, 4C 29.35, QSO B0958+290

3C 234 is a Seyfert galaxy with a quasar-like appearance located in the constellation Leo Minor.
