= 21 Leonis Minoris =

Star in the constellation Leo Minor

- Location of 21 Leonis Minoris (circled in red)

Observation data Epoch J2000 Equinox ICRS
- Constellation: Leo Minor
- Right ascension: 10^{h} 07^{m} 25.76296^{s}
- Declination: +35° 14′ 40.8965″
- Apparent magnitude (V): 4.47–4.52

Characteristics
- Evolutionary stage: main sequence
- Spectral type: A7V
- U−B color index: +0.08
- B−V color index: +0.18
- Variable type: δ Sct

Astrometry
Radial velocity (R_{v})	−11.40 ± 0.9 km/s
Proper motion (μ)	RA: 52.90 mas/yr Dec.: 0.62 mas/yr
Parallax (π)	35.41±0.18 mas
Distance	92.1 ± 0.5 ly (28.2 ± 0.1 pc)
Absolute magnitude (M_{V})	+2.43

Details
Mass	1.75 M_{☉}
Radius	1.75 R_{☉}
Luminosity	9.91 L_{☉}
Surface gravity (log g)	4.07 cgs
Temperature	7,839 K
Metallicity [Fe/H]	0.03±0.08 dex
Rotational velocity (v sin i)	155 km/s
Age	390 Myr; 750 Myr

Other designations
- 21 LMi, BD+35°2110, GJ 378.3, GJ 9314, HD 87696, HIP 49593, HR 3974, SAO 61874

Database references
SIMBAD	data

21 Leonis Minoris is a star in the constellation of Leo Minor. With an apparent magnitude of about 4.5, the star is faintly visible to the naked eye (see Bortle scale). Parallax estimates made by the Hipparcos spacecraft put it at a fairly close distance of about 92.1 light-years (28.2 parsecs) away from the Earth. It is considered a member of the Sirius supercluster.

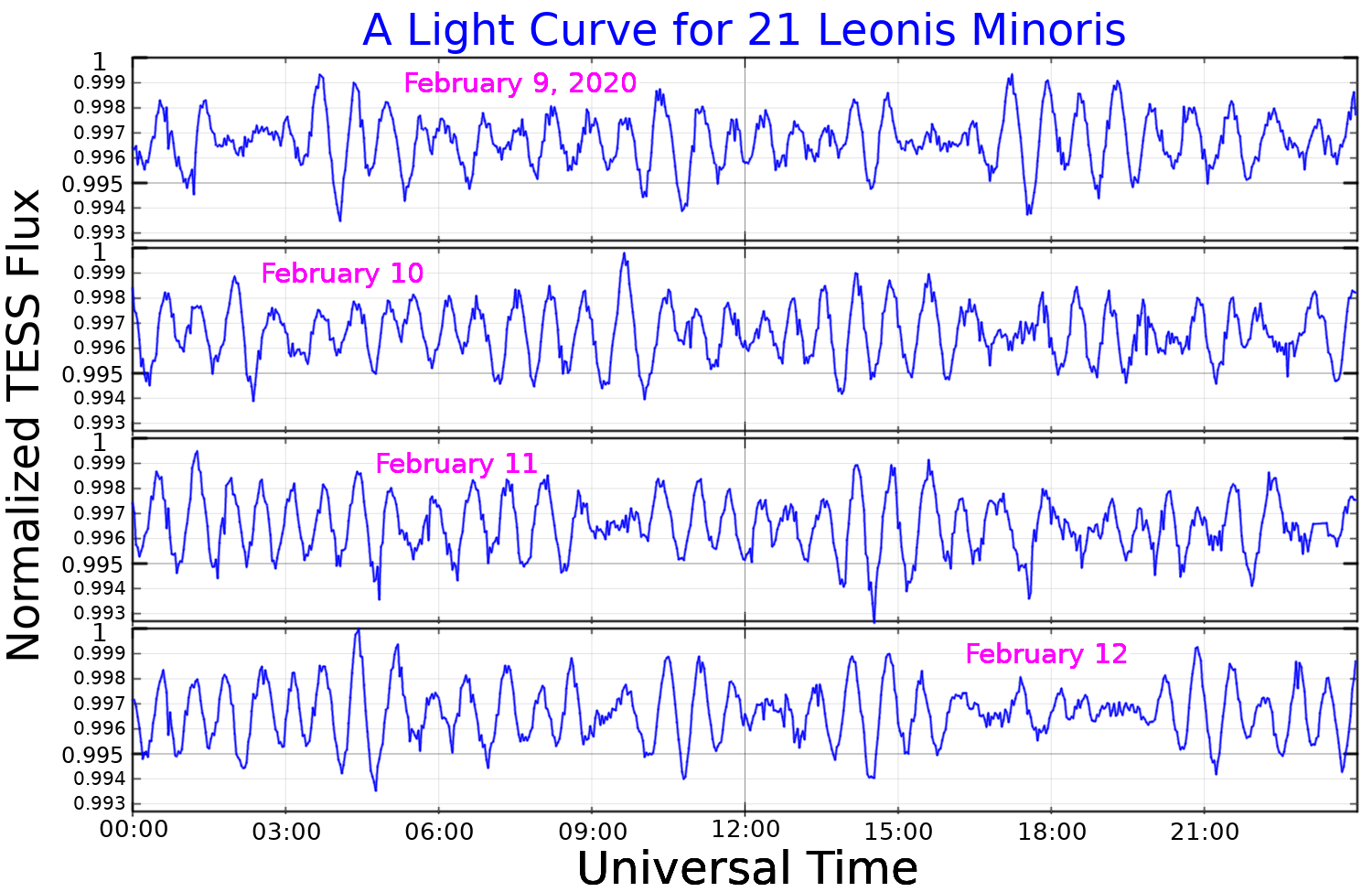
A light curve for 21 Leonis Minoris plotted from TESS data

21 Leonis Minoris rotates fairly fast for a star; its projected rotational velocity is estimated to be 155 km/s so it must be rotating at least that fast. It has been listed as a fast-rotating spectral standard star for the spectral type of A7V, as opposed to the slow-rotating standard star 2 Hydrae. It is also a Delta Scuti variable, and its apparent magnitude varies from 4.47 to 4.52.

21 Leonis Minoris has an infrared excess, suggesting a debris disk around it. The black body fit has a temperature of 60 K with an orbital radius of 62 AU.
