= Leonis Minorids =

Meteor shower

- Celestial map of Leo Minor
- Parent body: C/1739 K1 (Zanotti)

Radiant
- Constellation: Leo Minor
- Right ascension: 10^{h} 48^{m} 0^{s}
- Declination: +37° 00′ 00″

Properties
- Occurs during: October 13 – November 3
- Date of peak: October 20–23
- Velocity: 62 km/s
- Zenithal hourly rate: 2 (average); 13.9 (2015)

Leonis Minorids (IMO designation: LMI; IAU shower number: 22) is a weak meteor shower that takes place from October 13 until November 3 each year, peaking around October 20–23. With a weak moon the meteor shower may be visible with the naked eye, however this meteor shower is best observed only from the Northern Hemisphere with telescopic plotting. This meteor shower is linked to comet C/1739 K1 and radiates from the constellation Leo Minor, which is a faint constellation north of Leo. The meteor shower often only produces 2 meteors an hour. The meteors pass at an average speed of 62 kilometers per second.

The Leonis Minorids reached a zenithal hourly rate of around 13.9 on 21 October 2015, and a zenithal hourly rate of 10 on 20 October 2023.

Being discovered centuries ago, comet C/1739 K1 is assumed to have an orbital eccentricity of 1.0, but could be periodic and return sometime in the next several hundred years.
