= C/1929 Y1 (Wilk) =

Non-periodic comet

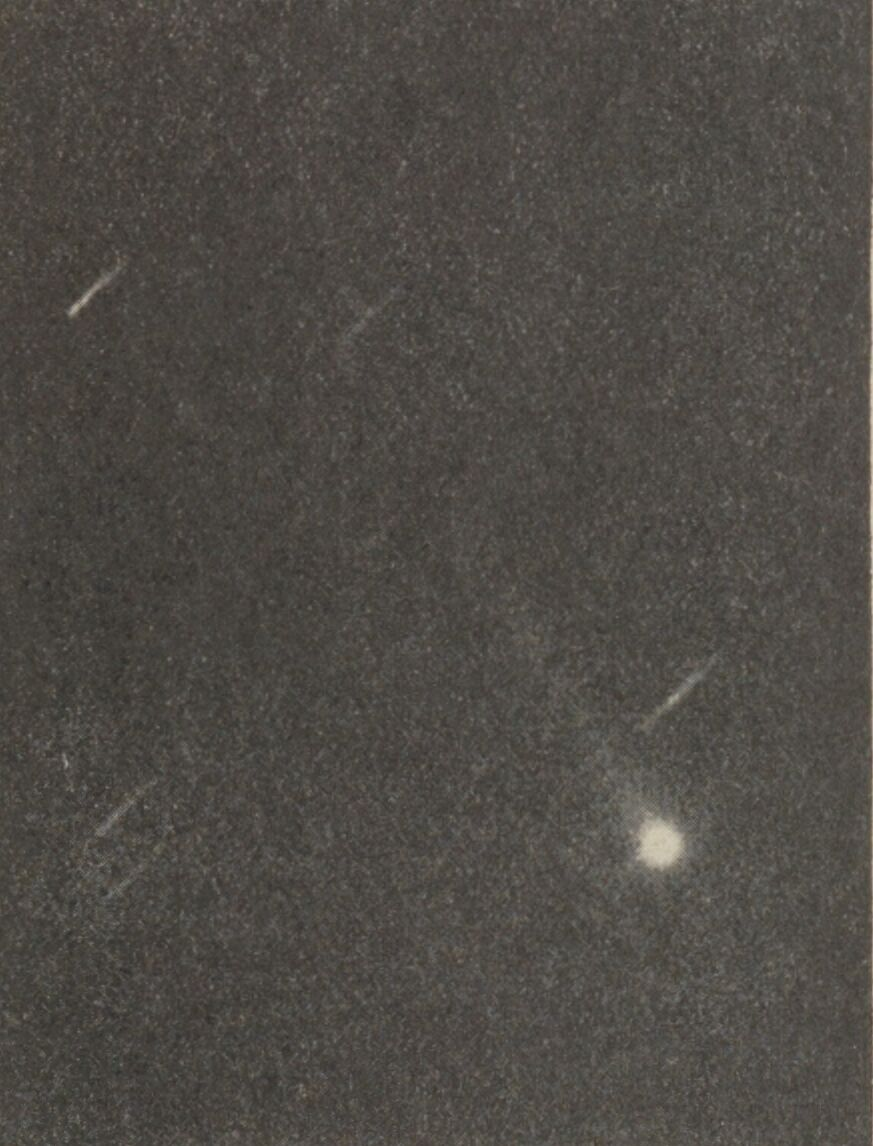
- Comet Wilk imaged by Ferdinand Quénisset from the Flammarion Observatory on 9 January 1930

Discovery
- Discovered by: Antoni Wilk
- Discovery site: Kraków, Poland
- Discovery date: 20 December 1929

Designations
- Alternative designations: 1930 II, 1929d

Orbital characteristics
- Epoch: 22 January 1930 (JD 2425998.8098)
- Observation arc: 39 days
- Number of observations: 212
- Aphelion: ~1,380 AU
- Perihelion: 0.672 AU
- Semi-major axis: ~690 AU
- Eccentricity: 0.99903
- Orbital period: ~18,000 years
- Inclination: 124.51°
- Longitude of ascending node: 179.97°
- Argument of periapsis: 157.49°
- Last perihelion: 22 January 1930
- T_{Jupiter}: –0.568

Physical characteristics
- Mean radius: 0.643 km (0.400 mi) (Note: Calculated mean radius using the formula: $\log_{10}\,(\,R\,)\ =\;0.9 +\;0.13 (\,H\,)$ Where $\,H\,$ is the comet's absolute total magnitude (M1))
- Comet total magnitude (M1): 8.4
- Apparent magnitude: 6.0 (1929 apparition)

Comet Wilk, formally designated as C/1929 Y1, is a non-periodic comet that became barely visible to the naked eye between December 1929 and January 1930. It is first comet independently discovered by Polish astronomer, Antoni Wilk, and the second of four overall. (Note: Antoni Wilk's first comet discovery is C/1925 V1, of which he co-discovered with Leslie Peltier.)

== Observational history ==
Antoni Wilk discovered his second comet as a 7th-magnitude object near the star, Vega, (Note: Reported initial position upon discovery was: α = 18^{h} 06^{m} , δ = 36° 18′) on the night of 20 December 1929.

== Orbit ==
Fred Whipple and Ernest Clare Bower were the first astronomers to compute the orbit of C/1929 Y1, using observations taken between 21–23 December 1929. While making follow-up calculations, Tadeusz Banachiewicz initially noticed that the orbit of comet Wilk has some resemblance to the orbit of C/1739 K1 (Zanotti), indicating a possible return of the latter comet. However, this claim is later refuted, as C/1739 K1 and C/1929 Y1 were found be unrelated to one another.

Frank Evans Seagrave determined that the comet reached perihelion on 22 January 1930, and it has an orbital period of 20,000 years. Fryderyk Koebcke later revised its orbital period to 18,000 years.

The comet made its closest approach to Earth on 23 December 1929 at a distance of 0.9 AU (130 million km).
