= NGC 3395 =

Galaxy in the constellation Leo Minor

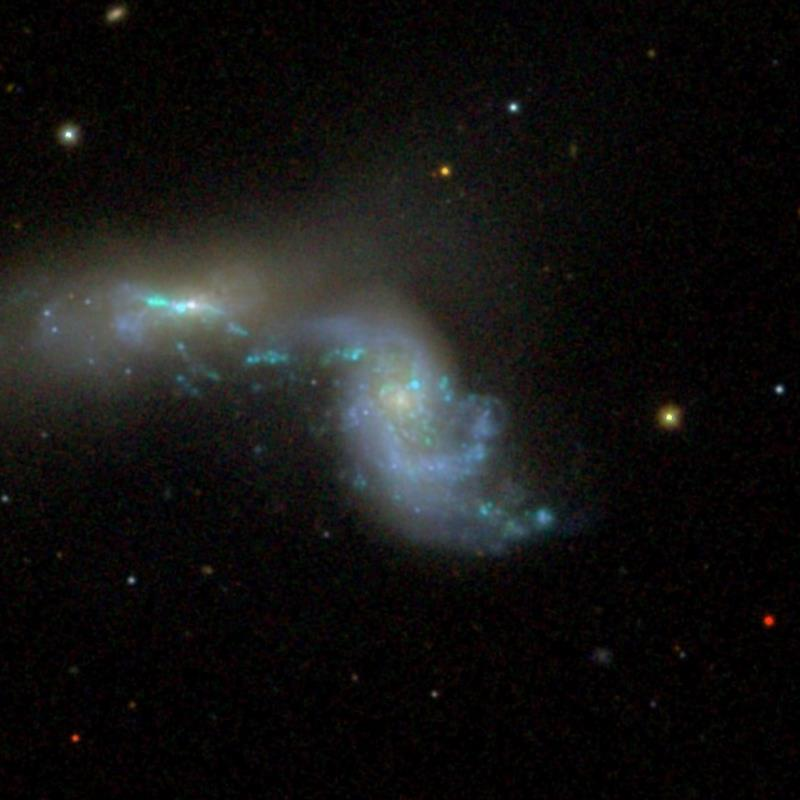
- NGC 3395 by Sloan Digital Sky Survey

Observation data (J2000 epoch)
- Constellation: Leo Minor
- Right ascension: 10^{h} 49^{m} 50.1^{s}
- Declination: +32° 58′ 58″
- Redshift: 0.005394±0.000002
- Heliocentric radial velocity: 1,617±1 km/s
- Distance: 54 ± 23 Mly (16.6 ± 7.1 Mpc)
- Apparent magnitude (V): 11.8

Characteristics
- Type: SAB(rs)cd pec
- Apparent size (V): 2.1′ × 1.1′
- Notable features: Interacting galaxy

Other designations
- IC 2613, Arp 270, UGC 5931, PGC 32424, VV 246b

NGC 3395 is a peculiar spiral galaxy in the constellation of Leo Minor. The galaxy lies about 55 million light years away from Earth, which means, given its apparent dimensions, that NGC 3395 is approximately 35,000 light years across. It was discovered by William Herschel on December 7, 1785. NGC 3395 interacts with NGC 3396.

NGC 3395 forms an interacting pair with NGC 3396, a magellanic spiral galaxy that lies 1.5 arcminutes from the nucleus of NGC 3395. The mass ratio of the two galaxies is about 1.5 to 1. The two galaxies appear separate but a bridge of material is visible between them and tidal tails are observed. Dynamical modelling of the pair suggests that the two galaxies had a first close encounter in the past, which resulting in gas been stripped from NGC 3395 and forming a tidal tail to the south-east. A second close encounter took place about 50 million years ago, resulting to starburst activity. The two galaxies will most likely merge in the next 500 million years.

The galaxy hosts a number of HII regions that are star forming with the region of most intense star formation being in the northwest of the center, while star formation has also being in observed in the end of the spiral arm northeast of the nucleus and in three regions in the bridge between the two galaxies. Three more star forming regions are visible in a tail southwest of the galaxy. The average size of the knots in NGC 3395 is an order of magnitude smaller than those in NGC 3396. The nucleus of NGC 3395 doesn't appear to be active.

The NGC 3395/3396 pair is part of the NGC 3430 Group or LGG 218. Other members of the group include the galaxies NGC 3381, NGC 3424, NGC 3430, NGC 3442, and IC 2604. IC 2604 lies 14 arcmin to the south-west of the pair and IC 2608 14 arcmin to the south-east. The group is part of the Leo II groups, which is part of the Virgo Supercluster.
