= C/1739 K1 (Zanotti) =

Non-periodic comet

Discovery
- Discovered by: Eustachio Zanotti
- Discovery site: Bologna, Italy
- Discovery date: 28 May 1739

Orbital characteristics
- Epoch: 17 June 1739 (JD 2356384.416)
- Observation arc: 82 days
- Perihelion: 0.674 AU
- Eccentricity: ~1.0 (assumed)
- Orbital period: unknown
- Inclination: 121.260°
- Longitude of ascending node: 211.044°
- Argument of periapsis: 104.752°
- Last perihelion: 17 June 1739

Physical characteristics
- Mean radius: 2.96 km (1.84 mi) (Note: Calculated mean radius using the formula: $\log_{10}\,(\,R\,)\ =\;0.9 +\;0.13 (\,H\,)$ Where $\,H\,$ is the comet's absolute total magnitude (M1))
- Comet total magnitude (M1): 3.3

C/1739 K1 is a non-periodic comet that was discovered by Italian astronomer Eustachio Zanotti in 1739. It is the parent body of the Leo Minorids meteor shower.

== Observational history ==
Zanotti spotted the comet in the constellation of Lynx on 27 May. He described it as a magnitude 3 star surrounded by nebulosity, while a tail 2 degrees long was spotted using a telescope. Zanotti followed the comet with the naked eye until 17 August, when it was only visible via a telescope. He last observed the comet the next day. It was also observed by James Bradley from 30 May to 10 June and Fuhrmann from June 8 to June 19.

The parabolic orbit calculated by Nicolas-Louis de Lacaille indicates it passed perihelion on 17.9 June. The comet had passed at a distance of 0.45 AU on 16 April 1739. The comet has a minimum orbital intersection distance with Earth of 0.049 AU and has been associated with the Leo Minorids meteor shower. The comet is assumed to have an orbital eccentricity of 1.0 to fit an orbit solution, but the comet could be periodic and return.

In 1929, Tadeusz Banachiewicz initially noted some similarities with the preliminary orbit of the then-newly discovered comet, C/1929 Y1 (Wilk), indicating a potential return of Comet Zanotti. However, the claim was later refuted and both comets are unrelated to each other.
