= NGC 3021 =

Galaxy in the constellation Leo Minor

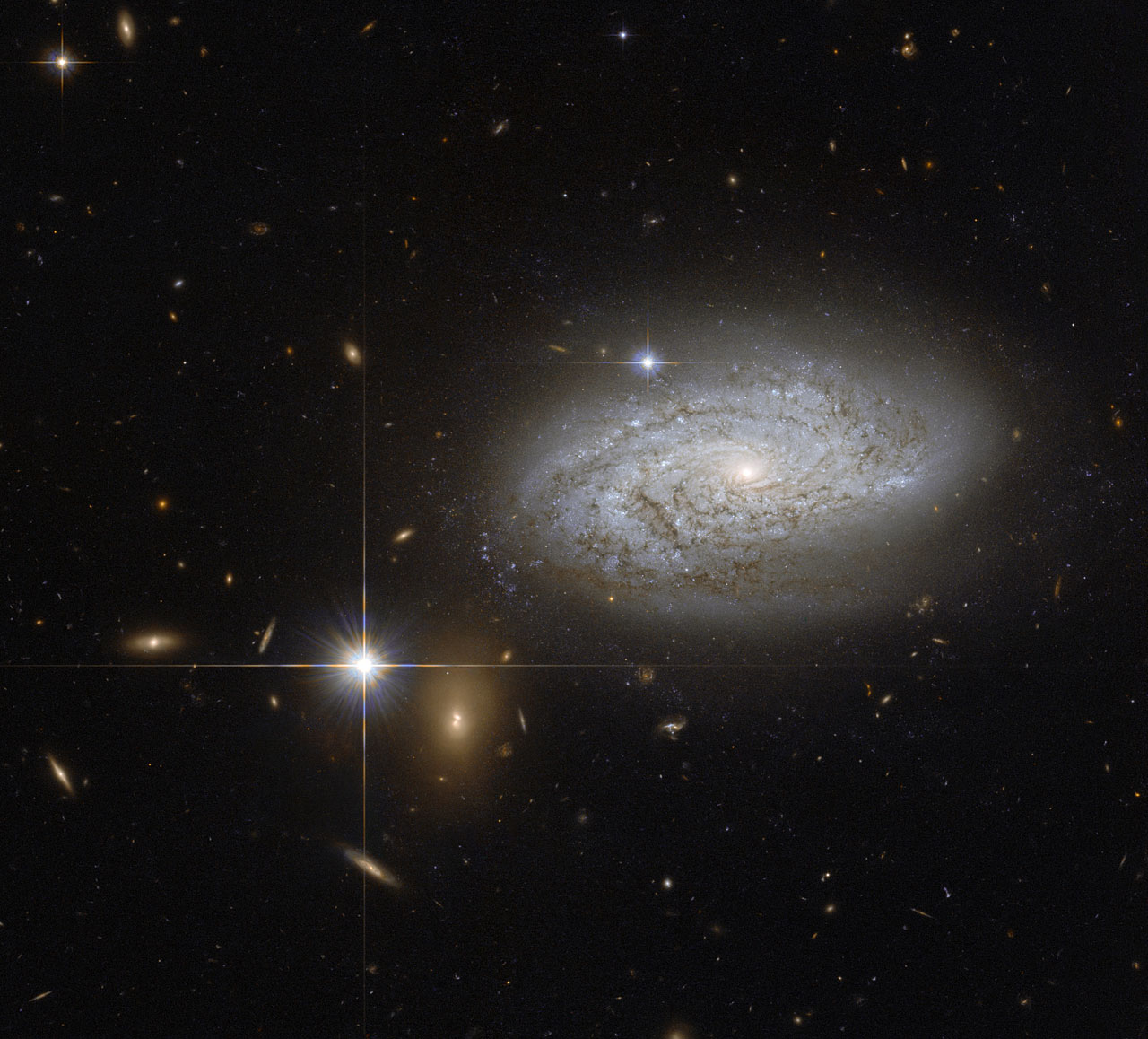
- NGC 3021 (right of center) imaged by the Hubble Space Telescope

Observation data (J2000 epoch)
- Constellation: Leo Minor
- Right ascension: 09^{h} 50^{m} 57.146^{s}
- Declination: +33° 33′ 12.94″
- Redshift: 0.005120±0.000009
- Heliocentric radial velocity: 1,537±4 km/s
- Galactocentric velocity: 1,502±4 km/s
- Distance: 92.8 Mly (28.44 Mpc)
- Apparent magnitude (V): 10.88
- Apparent magnitude (B): 12.54
- Absolute magnitude (V): −21.25

Characteristics
- Type: SA(rs)bc, 4.0
- Size: ~49,100 ly (15.06 kpc) (estimated)
- Apparent size (V): 1.6′ × 0.9′
- Notable features: Starburst galaxy

Other designations
- IRAS 09479+3347, 2MASX J09505711+3333124, UGC 5280, MCG +06-22-019, PGC 28357, CGCG 182-025

NGC 3021 is a spiral galaxy in the northern constellation of Leo Minor. It is about 93 million light-years away from Earth, and is receding with a heliocentric radial velocity of 1,537±4 km/s. This galaxy was discovered by German-British astronomer William Herschel on December 7, 1785. The morphological classification of NGC 3021 is SA(rs)bc, which indicates a spiral galaxy with no central bar (SA), an incomplete inner ring structure (rs), and moderate to loosely wound spiral arms (bc).

The galaxy contains many Cepheid variable stars. These stars have been used to measure the distances of galaxies. This galaxy was also used to help refine the measurement of the Hubble constant.

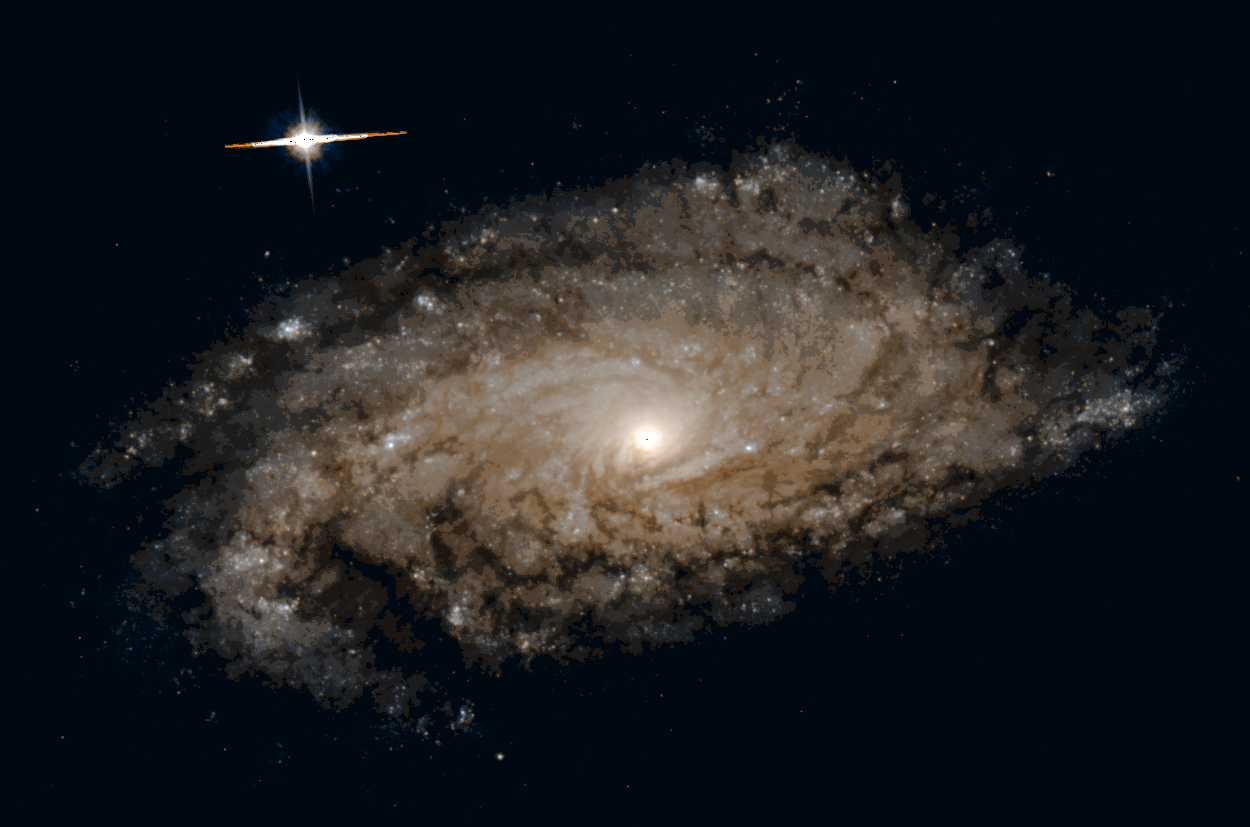
Spiral galaxy NGC 3021.

== Supernovae ==
Two supernovae have been observed in NGC 3021:

- SN 1995al (Type Ia, mag. 13) was discovered by S. Pesci and P. Mazza in Milan, Italy, on November 1, 1995. G. M. Hurst in England confirmed the finding, estimating the magnitude at 13.2. The supernova was offset 15.0″ west and 2.9″ south of the galactic nucleus. The spectrum was found to be similar to SN 1981b near maximum.
- SN 2023bvj (Type II, mag. 17.287) was discovered by ATLAS on February 18, 2023.

== See also ==
- List of NGC objects (3001–4000)
