= 37 Leonis Minoris =

Star in the constellation Leo Minor

- Location of 37 Leonis Minoris (circled in red)

Observation data Epoch J2000 Equinox J2000
- Constellation: Leo Minor
- Right ascension: 10^{h} 38^{m} 43.21^{s}
- Declination: +31° 58′ 34.4″
- Apparent magnitude (V): 4.68

Characteristics
- Spectral type: G2.5 IIa
- B−V color index: 0.823±0.008

Astrometry
Radial velocity (R_{v})	−8.0±0.3 km/s
Proper motion (μ)	RA: +9.76 mas/yr Dec.: −35.56 mas/yr
Parallax (π)	5.58±0.24 mas
Distance	580 ± 30 ly (179 ± 8 pc)
Absolute magnitude (M_{V})	−1.84

Details
Mass	3.72 M_{☉}
Radius	24 R_{☉}
Luminosity	438 L_{☉}
Surface gravity (log g)	2.22 cgs
Temperature	5,468 K
Metallicity [Fe/H]	0.03 dex
Rotational velocity (v sin i)	6.4 km/s
Age	200 Myr

Other designations
- 37 LMi, BD+32°2061, FK5 1275, HD 92125, HIP 52098, HR 4166, SAO 62173

Database references
SIMBAD	data

37 Leonis Minoris is a single, yellow-hued star in the northern constellation of Leo Minor. It is faintly visible to the naked eye with an apparent visual magnitude of 4.68. The star is moving closer to the Sun with a heliocentric radial velocity of −8 km/s. The annual parallax shift of 5.58±0.24 mas provides a distance estimate of roughly 580 light years.

The Bright Star Catalogue lists this star with a stellar classification of G2.5 IIa, indicating it is an evolved G-type bright giant. Gray et al. (2001) gave it a class of G1 II, while Keenan and McNeil (1989) assigned this star to the giant class G2.5 IIIa. It has an estimated 3.72 times the mass of the Sun and about 24 times the Sun's radius. The star is around 200 million years old with a projected rotational velocity of 6.4 km/s. It is radiating about 438 times the Sun's luminosity from its enlarged photosphere at an effective temperature of 5,468 K.
