= NGC 3396 =

Galaxy in the constellation Leo Minor

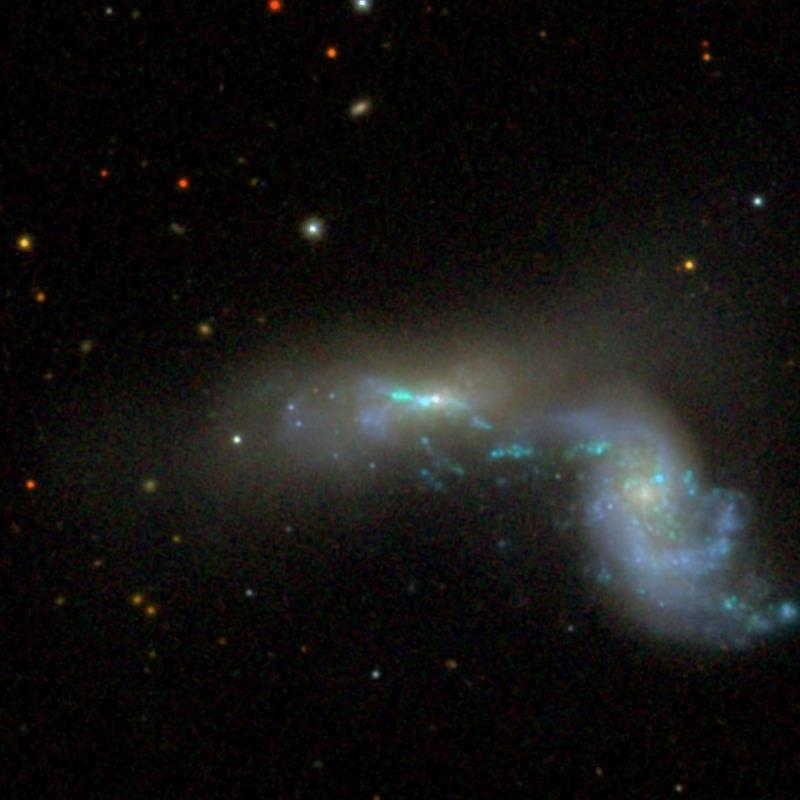
- NGC 3396 by Sloan Digital Sky Survey

Observation data (J2000 epoch)
- Constellation: Leo Minor
- Right ascension: 10^{h} 49^{m} 55.1^{s}
- Declination: +32° 59′ 27″
- Redshift: 0.005537 ± 0.000002
- Heliocentric radial velocity: 1,660 ± 1 km/s
- Distance: 81 ± 23 Mly (24.9 ± 4.4 Mpc)
- Apparent magnitude (V): 12.0

Characteristics
- Type: IBm pec
- Apparent size (V): 2.9′ × 1.2′
- Notable features: Interacting galaxy

Other designations
- UGC 5935, Arp 270, VV 246b, MCG +06-24-018, PGC 32434

NGC 3396 is a peculiar barred irregular galaxy in the constellation Leo Minor. The galaxy lies about 80 million light years away from Earth, which means, given its apparent dimensions, that NGC 3396 is approximately 85,000 light years across. It was discovered by William Herschel on December 7, 1785.

== Characteristics ==
NGC 3396 forms an interacting pair with NGC 3395, a spiral galaxy that lies 1.5 arcminutes from NGC 3396. The mass ratio of the two galaxies is about 1.5 to 1, with NGC 3395 being the more massive of the two. The two galaxies appear separate but a bridge of material is visible between them and tidal tails are observed. Dynamical modelling of the pair suggests that the two galaxies had a first close encounter in the past, which resulting in gas been stripped from NGC 3395 and forming a tidal tail to the south-east. A second close encounter took place about 50 million years ago, resulting to starburst activity. The two galaxies will most likely merge in the next 500 million years.

The galaxy hosts a number of HII regions that are star forming with the region of most intense star formation being in the center of the galaxy. The average size of the knots in NGC 3396 is an order of magnitude larger than those in NGC 3395. The central region of NGC 3396 is estimated to host 1,000 to 2,000 Wolf-Rayet stars and tens of thousands of O-type stars. The star formation rate in the circumnuclear is estimated to be 0.15 M_{☉} per year and in the rest of the galaxy 0.39 M_{☉}.

The nucleus of the galaxy has been found to be active and based on its spectrum it has been categorised as a LINER. Kinematic analysis of the gas indicates there is gas inflow to the centre of the galaxy along its bar and also there is an biconal outflow element that could be galactic wind from a supermassive black hole in the nucleus.

== Nearby galaxies ==
The NGC 3395/3396 pair is part of the NGC 3430 Group or LGG 218. Other members of the group include the galaxies NGC 3381, NGC 3424, NGC 3430, NGC 3442, and IC 2604. IC 2604 lies 14 arcmin to the south-west of the pair and IC 2608 14 arcmin to the south-east. The group is part of the Leo II groups, which is part of the Virgo Supercluster.
