= Leo Minor =

Constellation in the northern celestial hemisphere

- Constellation
- List of stars in Leo Minor
- Abbreviation: LMi
- Genitive: Leonis Minoris
- Pronunciation: /ˌliːoʊ ˈmaɪnər/ LEE-oh MY-nər, genitive /liːˌoʊnɪs mɪˈnɔːrɪs/ lee-OH-niss min-OR-iss
- Symbolism: the lesser Lion
- Right ascension: 9^{h} 22.4^{m} –11^{h} 06.5^{m}
- Declination: 22.84°–41.43°
- Quadrant: NQ2
- Area: 232 sq. deg. (64th)
- Main stars: 3
- Bayer/Flamsteed stars: 34
- Stars brighter than 3.00^{m}: 0
- Stars within 10.00 pc (32.62 ly): 1
- Brightest star: Praecipua (3.83^{m})
- Nearest star: GJ 1138
- Messier objects: 0
- Meteor showers: Leonis Minorids
- Bordering constellations: Ursa Major; Lynx; Cancer (corner); Leo
- Visible at latitudes between +90° and −45°. Best visible at 21:00 (9 p.m.) during the month of April.

Leo Minor is a small and faint constellation in the northern celestial hemisphere. Its name is Latin for "the smaller lion", in contrast to Leo, the larger lion. It lies between the larger and more recognizable Ursa Major to the north and Leo to the south. Leo Minor was not regarded as a separate constellation by classical astronomers; it was designated by Johannes Hevelius in 1687.

There are 37 stars brighter than apparent magnitude 6.5 in the constellation; three are brighter than magnitude 4.5. 46 Leonis Minoris, an orange giant of magnitude 3.8, is located some 95 light-years from Earth. At magnitude 4.4, Beta Leonis Minoris is the second-brightest star and the only one in the constellation with a Bayer designation. It is a binary star, the brighter component of which is an orange giant and the fainter a yellow-white main sequence star. The third-brightest star is 21 Leonis Minoris, a rapidly rotating white main-sequence star of average magnitude 4.5. The constellation also includes two stars with planetary systems, two pairs of interacting galaxies, and Hanny's Voorwerp, a unique deep-sky object.

== History ==
The classical astronomers Aratus and Ptolemy had noted the region of what is now Leo Minor to be undefined and not containing any distinctive patterns; Ptolemy classified the stars in this area as amorphōtoi (not belonging to a constellation outline) within the constellation Leo.

Johannes Hevelius first depicted Leo Minor in 1687 when he outlined ten new constellations in his star atlas Firmamentum Sobiescianum, and included 18 of its objects in the accompanying Catalogus Stellarum Fixarum. Hevelius decided upon Leo Minor or Leo Junior as a depiction that would align with its beastly neighbours the Lion and the Great Bear. In 1845, English astronomer Francis Baily revised the catalogue of Hevelius's new constellations, and assigned a Greek letter known as Bayer designation to stars brighter than apparent magnitude 4.5. Richard A. Proctor gave the constellation the name Leaena "the Lioness" in 1870, explaining that he sought to shorten the constellation names to make them more manageable on celestial charts.

German astronomer Christian Ludwig Ideler posited that the stars of Leo Minor had been termed Al Thibā' wa-Aulāduhā "Gazelle with her Young" on a 13th-century Arabic celestial globe, recovered by Cardinal Stefano Borgia and housed in the prelate's museum at Velletri. Arabist Friedrich Wilhelm Lach describes a different view, noting that they had been seen as Al Haud "the Pond", which the Gazelle jumps into. In Chinese astronomy, the stars Beta, 30, 37 and 46 Leonis Minoris made up Neiping, a "Court of Judge or Mediator", or Shi "Court Eunuch" or were combined with stars of the neighbouring Leo to make up a large celestial dragon or State Chariot. A line of four stars was known as Shaowei; it represented four Imperial advisors and may have been located in Leo Minor, Leo or adjacent regions.

== Characteristics ==
A dark area of the sky with a triangle of brighter stars just visible to the naked eye in good conditions, Leo Minor has been described by Patrick Moore as having "dubious claims to a separate identity". It is a small constellation bordered by Ursa Major to the north, Lynx to the west, Leo to the south, and touching the corner of Cancer to the southwest. The three-letter abbreviation for the constellation, as adopted by the International Astronomical Union in 1922, is "LMi". The official constellation boundaries, as set by Belgian astronomer Eugène Delporte in 1930, are defined by a polygon of 16 sides. In the equatorial coordinate system, the right ascension coordinates of these borders lie between 9^{h} 22.4^{m} and 11^{h} 06.5^{m} , while the declination coordinates are between 22.84° and 41.43°. Ranked 64th out of 88 constellations in size, Leo Minor covers an area of 232.0 square degrees, or 0.562 per cent of the sky. It culminates each year at midnight on 24 February, and at 9 p.m. on 24 May.

== Features ==
=== Stars ===
There are only three stars in the constellation brighter than magnitude 4.5, and 37 stars with a magnitude brighter than 6.5. Leo Minor does not have a star designated Alpha because Baily erred and allocated a Greek letter to only one star, Beta. It is unclear whether he intended to give 46 Leonis Minoris a Bayer designation, as he recognized Beta and 46 Leonis Minoris as of the appropriate brightness in his catalogue. He died before revising his proofs, which might explain this star's omission.

At magnitude 3.8, the brightest star in Leo Minor is an orange giant of spectral class K0III named 46 Leonis Minoris or Praecipua; its colour is evident when seen through binoculars. Situated 95 light-years (29 parsecs) from Earth, it has around 32 times the luminosity and is 8.5 times the size of the Sun. It was also catalogued and named as o Leonis Minoris by Johann Elert Bode, which has been misinterpreted as Omicron Leonis Minoris. More confusion occurred with its proper name Praecipua, which appears to have been originally applied to 37 Leonis Minoris in the 1814 Palermo Catalogue of Giuseppe Piazzi, who mistakenly assessed the latter star as the brighter. This name was later connected by Allen with 46 Leonis Minoris—an error perpetuated by subsequent astronomers. The original "Praecipua", 37 Leonis Minoris, has an apparent magnitude of 4.69, but is a distant yellow supergiant of spectral type G2.5IIa and absolute magnitude of −1.84, around 578 light-years (177 parsecs) distant.

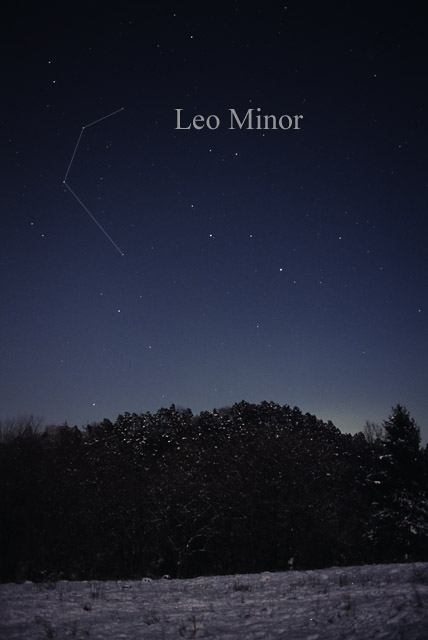
Leo Minor as seen by the naked eye

Beta Leonis Minoris is a binary star system. The primary is a giant star of spectral class G9III and apparent magnitude of 4.4. It has around double the mass, 7.8 times the radius and 36 times the luminosity of the Earth's Sun. Separated by 0.1 to 0.6 second of arc from the primary, the secondary is a yellow-white main sequence star of spectral type F8. The two orbit around a common centre of gravity every 38.62 years, and lie 154 light-years (47 parsecs) away from the Solar System.

Around 98 light-years (30 parsecs) away and around 10 times as luminous as the Sun, 21 Leonis Minoris is a rapidly rotating white main-sequence star, spinning on its axis in less than 12 hours and very likely flattened in shape. Of average apparent magnitude 4.5 and spectral type A7V, it is a Delta Scuti variable. These are short period (six hours at most) pulsating stars which have been used as standard candles and as subjects to study asteroseismology.

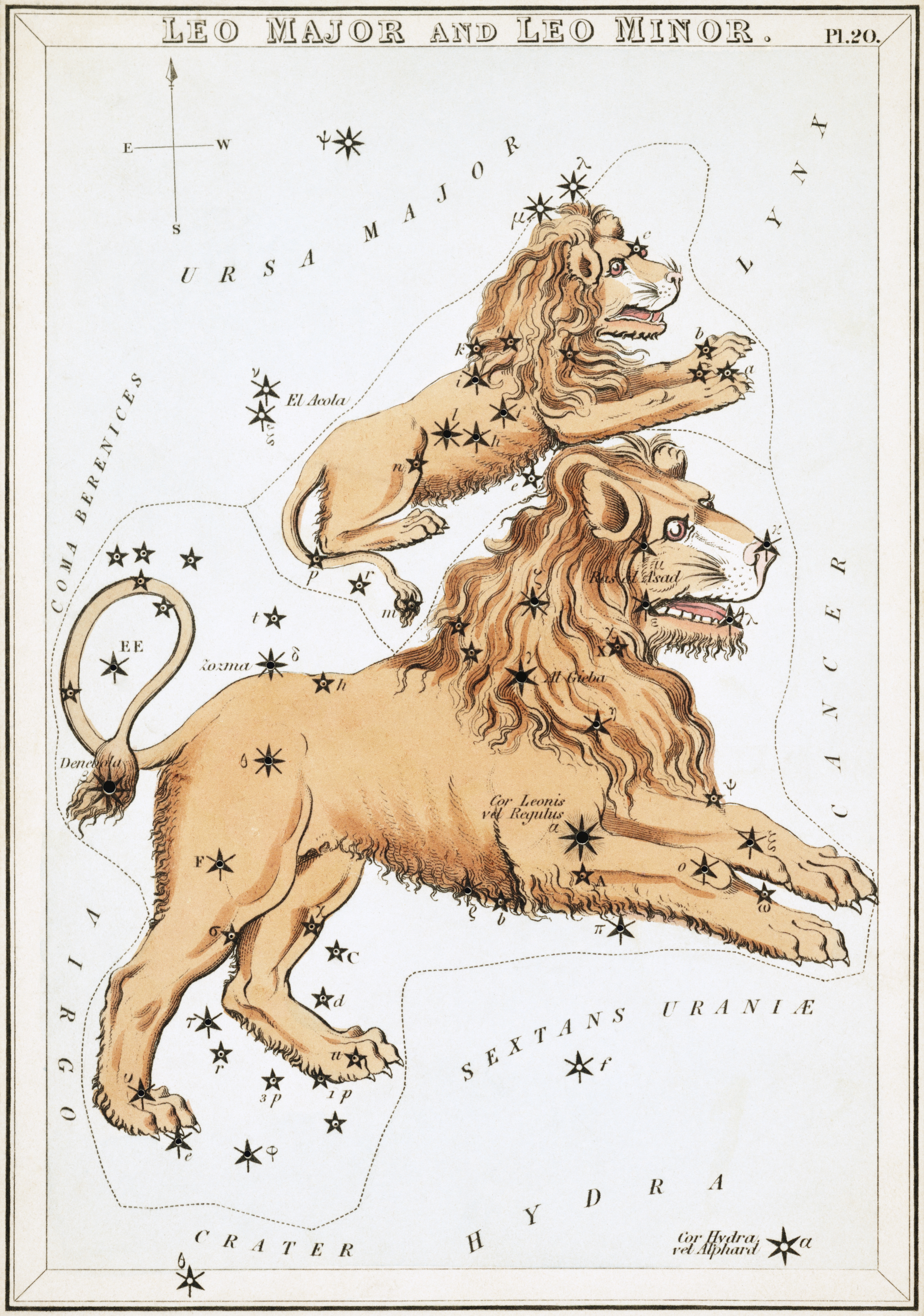
Leo Minor above the head of Leo, as depicted in Urania's Mirror, a set of constellation cards published in London c. 1825

Also known as SU and SV Leonis Minoris, 10 and 11 Leonis Minoris are yellow giants of spectral type G8III, with average magnitudes 4.54 and 5.34 respectively. Both are RS Canum Venaticorum variables, with 10 Leonis Minoris varying by 0.012 magnitude over 40.4 days, and 11 Leonis Minoris by 0.033 magnitude over 18 days. 11 Leonis Minoris has a red dwarf companion of spectral type M5V and apparent magnitude 13.0. 20 Leonis Minoris is a multiple star system 49 light-years (15 parsecs) away from the Sun. The main star is another yellow star, this time a dwarf of spectral type G3Va and apparent magnitude 5.4. The companion is an old, active red dwarf that has a relatively high metallicity and is of spectral type M6.5. The fact that the secondary star is brighter than expected indicates it is likely two stars very close together that are unable to be made out separately with current viewing technology.

R and S Leonis Minoris are long-period Mira variables, while U Leonis Minoris is a semiregular variable; all three are red giants of spectral types M6.5e-M9.0e, M5e and M6 respectively. R varies between magnitudes 6.3 and 13.2 during a period of 372 days, S varies between magnitudes 8.6 and 13.9 during a period of 234 days, and U varies between magnitudes 10.0 and 13.3 during a period of 272 days. The lack of bright stars makes finding these objects challenging for amateur astronomers. G 117-B15A, also known as RY Leonis Minoris, is a pulsating white dwarf of apparent magnitude 15.5. With a period of approximately 215 seconds, and losing a second every 8.9 million years, the 400-million-year-old star has been proposed as the most stable celestial clock.

SX Leonis Minoris is a dwarf nova of the SU Ursae Majoris type that was identified in 1994. It consists of a white dwarf and a donor star, which orbit each other every 97 minutes. The white dwarf sucks matter from the other star onto an accretion disc and heats up to between 6000 and 10000 K. The dwarf star erupts every 34 to 64 days, reaching magnitude 13.4 in these outbursts and remaining at magnitude 16.8 when quiet. Leo Minor contains another dwarf nova, RZ Leonis Minoris, which brightens to magnitude 14.2 from a baseline magnitude of around 17 but does so at shorter intervals than other dwarf novae.

Two stars with planetary systems have been found. HD 87883 is an orange dwarf of magnitude 7.57 and spectral type K0V 18 parsecs distant from Earth. With a diameter three quarters that of Earth's sun, it is only 31 per cent as luminous. It is orbited by a planet around 1.78 times the mass of Jupiter every 7.9 years, and there are possibly other smaller planets. HD 82886 (Illyrian) is a yellow dwarf of spectral type G0 and visual magnitude 7.63. A planet 1.3 times the mass of Jupiter and orbiting every 705 days was discovered in 2011.

=== Deep-sky objects ===
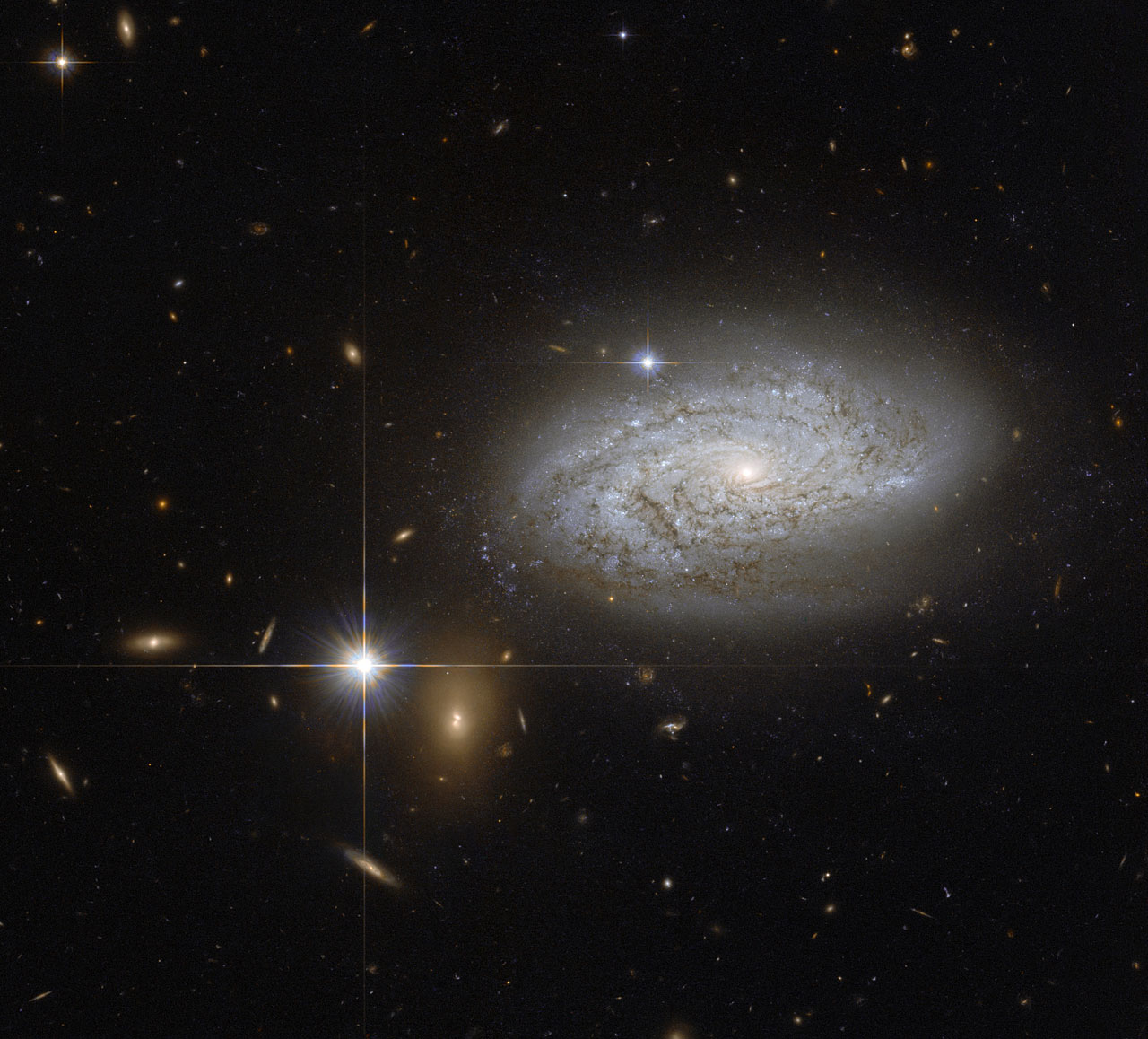
Spiral galaxy NGC 3021 which lies about 100 million light-years away.

In terms of deep-sky objects, Leo Minor contains many galaxies viewable in amateur telescopes. Located 3 degrees southeast of 38 Leonis Minoris, NGC 3432 is seen nearly edge on. It is of apparent magnitude 11.7 and measures 6.8 by 1.4 arcminutes. Located 42 million light-years away, it is moving away from the Solar System at a rate of 616 km per second. In 2000, a star within the galaxy brightened to magnitude 17.4, and has since been determined to be a luminous blue variable and supernova impostor. It has tidal filaments and intense star formation, so it was listed in Halton Arp's Atlas of Peculiar Galaxies. NGC 3003, a SBbc barred spiral galaxy with an apparent magnitude of 12.3 and an angular size of 5.8 arcminutes, is seen almost edge-on. NGC 3344, 25 million light-years distant, is face-on towards Earth. Measuring 7.1 by 6.5 arcminutes in size, it has an apparent magnitude of 10.45. NGC 3504 is a starburst barred spiral galaxy of apparent magnitude 11.67 and measuring 2.1 by 2.7 arcminutes. It has hosted supernovae in 1998 and 2001. It and the spiral galaxy NGC 3486 are also almost face-on towards Earth; the latter is of magnitude 11.05 and measures 7.1 by 5.2 arcminutes. NGC 2859 is an SB0-type lenticular galaxy.

At least two pairs of interacting galaxies have been observed. Arp 107 is a pair of galaxies in the process of merging, located 450 million light-years away. NGC 3395 and NGC 3396 are a spiral and irregular barred spiral galaxy, respectively, that are interacting, located 1.33 degrees southwest of 46 Leonis Minoris.

The unique deep-sky object known as Hanny's Voorwerp was discovered in Leo Minor in 2007 by Dutch school teacher Hanny van Arkel while participating as a volunteer in the Galaxy Zoo project. Lying near the 650-million-light-year-distant spiral galaxy IC 2497, it is around the same size as the Milky Way. It contains a 16,000-light-year-wide hole. The voorwerp is thought to be the visual light echo of a quasar now gone inactive, possibly as recently as 200,000 years ago.

=== Meteor showers ===
Discovered by Dick McCloskey and Annette Posen of the Harvard Meteor Program in 1959, the Leonis Minorid meteor shower peaks between 18 and 29 October. The shower's parent body is the long period comet C/1739 K1 (Zanotti). It is a minor shower, and can only be seen from the Northern Hemisphere.

== See also ==
- 3C 234
- Leo Minor (Chinese astronomy)
