= List of stars in Leo Minor =

This is the list of notable stars in the constellation Leo Minor, sorted by decreasing brightness.

Name	B	F	Var	HD	HIP	RA	Dec	vis. mag.	abs. mag.	Dist. (ly)	Sp. class	Notes
46 LMi		46		94264	53229	10^{h} 53^{m} 18.64^{s}	+34° 12′ 56.0″	3.79	1.41	98	K0III-IV	Praecipua (mistransferred), Praecipula; presumably intended to be α; suspected variable, V_{max} = 3.79^{m}, V_{min} = 3.84^{m}
β LMi	β	31		90537	51233	10^{h} 27^{m} 53.09^{s}	+36° 42′ 26.9″	4.20	0.95	146	G8III-IV	binary star
21 LMi		21		87696	49593	10^{h} 07^{m} 25.73^{s}	+35° 14′ 40.9″	4.49	2.26	91	A7V	suspected δ Sct variable, V_{max} = 4.47^{m}, V_{min} = 4.52^{m}
10 LMi		10	SU	82635	46952	09^{h} 34^{m} 13.38^{s}	+36° 23′ 51.4″	4.54	0.88	176	G8III	RS CVn variable, ΔV = 0.02^{m}
37 LMi		37		92125	52098	10^{h} 38^{m} 43.21^{s}	+31° 58′ 34.4″	4.68	−1.13	474	G0II	Praecipua (original)
30 LMi		30		90277	51056	10^{h} 25^{m} 54.87^{s}	+33° 47′ 46.5″	4.72	0.71	207	F0V	
41 LMi		41		92825	52457	10^{h} 43^{m} 25.03^{s}	+23° 11′ 18.2″	5.08	1.06	207	A3Vn	
19 LMi		19		86146	48833	09^{h} 57^{m} 41.05^{s}	+41° 03′ 20.3″	5.10	2.81	94	F6Vs	Binary system
42 LMi		42		93152	52638	10^{h} 45^{m} 51.91^{s}	+30° 40′ 56.6″	5.36	0.04	377	A1Vn	
20 LMi		20		86728	49081	10^{h} 01^{m} 01.02^{s}	+31° 55′ 29.0″	5.37	4.50	49	G1V	Cor; binary star
11 LMi		11	SV	82885	47080	09^{h} 35^{m} 40.03^{s}	+35° 48′ 38.8″	5.39	5.16	36	G8IV-V	RS CVn variable, ΔV = 0.04^{m}
8 LMi		8		82198	46735	09^{h} 31^{m} 32.45^{s}	+35° 06′ 12.6″	5.40	−0.24	436	M1III	suspected variable, ΔV = 0.07^{m}
23 LMi		23		88960	50303	10^{h} 16^{m} 14.48^{s}	+29° 18′ 38.0″	5.49	1.00	257	A0Vn	
40 LMi		40		92769	52422	10^{h} 43^{m} 01.95^{s}	+26° 19′ 32.5″	5.51	2.22	148	A4Vn	
28 LMi		28		90040	50935	10^{h} 24^{m} 08.61^{s}	+33° 43′ 06.7″	5.52	0.03	409	K1III	
34 LMi		34		91365	51685	10^{h} 33^{m} 30.93^{s}	+34° 59′ 19.3″	5.57	−0.48	528	A2Vn	
32 LMi		32		90840	51420	10^{h} 30^{m} 06.46^{s}	+38° 55′ 30.5″	5.79	−1.05	760	A4V	
38 LMi		38		92168	52139	10^{h} 39^{m} 07.80^{s}	+37° 54′ 36.4″	5.84	2.39	159	F9V	
HD 88231				88231	49893	10^{h} 11^{m} 12.79^{s}	+37° 24′ 07.1″	5.86	−0.47	603	K3III	
7 LMi		7		82087	46652	09^{h} 30^{m} 43.23^{s}	+33° 39′ 21.0″	5.87	−0.12	515	G8III:	
27 LMi		27		89904	50860	10^{h} 23^{m} 06.34^{s}	+33° 54′ 29.4″	5.89	1.65	230	A6V	
33 LMi		33		91130	51556	10^{h} 31^{m} 51.36^{s}	+32° 22′ 46.3″	5.90	1.52	245	A0IV	
RX LMi			RX	92620	52366	10^{h} 42^{m} 11.27^{s}	+31° 41′ 49.4″	6.02	−0.77	743	M2III	semiregular variable, V_{max} = 5.98^{m}, V_{min} = 6.16^{m}, P = 150 d
44 LMi		44		93765	52959	10^{h} 49^{m} 53.73^{s}	+27° 58′ 25.9″	6.05	1.59	254	F5V	Binary star
13 LMi		13		83951	47631	09^{h} 42^{m} 42.75^{s}	+35° 05′ 36.6″	6.12	2.49	174	F3V	suspected variable
43 LMi		43		93636	52882	10^{h} 48^{m} 57.28^{s}	+29° 24′ 58.1″	6.15	−0.17	598	K0	
9 LMi		9		82522	46904	09^{h} 33^{m} 30.33^{s}	+36° 29′ 13.3″	6.19	0.67	414	K4III:	
48 LMi		48	WW	94480	53355	10^{h} 54^{m} 42.20^{s}	+25° 29′ 26.6″	6.19	0.72	405	A8V	δ Sct variable, V_{max} = 6.16^{m}, V_{min} = 6.23^{m}, P = 0.12691 d
HD 87822				87822	49658	10^{h} 08^{m} 15.94^{s}	+31° 36′ 15.4″	6.23	2.22	206	F4V	triple star
35 LMi		35		91752	51914	10^{h} 36^{m} 21.39^{s}	+36° 19′ 37.2″	6.29	2.96	151	F3V	
R LMi			R	84346	47886	09^{h} 45^{m} 34.28^{s}	+34° 30′ 42.8″	6.30		1130	M6.5-9e	Mira variable, V_{max} = 6.3^{m}, V_{min} = 13.2^{m}, P = 372.19 d
HD 88161				88161	49870	10^{h} 10^{m} 58.98^{s}	+40° 39′ 41.8″	6.34	0.03	596	K3III:	suspected flare star
HD 89993				89993	50904	10^{h} 23^{m} 41.76^{s}	+29° 36′ 57.2″	6.36	1.06	374	G8III	
50 LMi		50		94747	53492	10^{h} 56^{m} 34.44^{s}	+25° 30′ 00.9″	6.36	1.67	282	K0	
36 LMi		36		92000	52032	10^{h} 37^{m} 52.28^{s}	+34° 04′ 43.0″	6.42	−1.38	1185	K0	
24 LMi		24		88986	50316	10^{h} 16^{m} 28.12^{s}	+28° 40′ 57.7″	6.46	3.93	104	G0V	
22 LMi		22		88786	50218	10^{h} 15^{m} 06.36^{s}	+31° 28′ 05.1″	6.47	−0.38	763	G8III	
29 LMi		29		90250	51047	10^{h} 25^{m} 45.00^{s}	+35° 25′ 32.1″	6.49	0.98	413	K1III	
16 LMi		16		85029	48256	09^{h} 50^{m} 13.87^{s}	+39° 37′ 54.1″	6.64	−1.11	1156	K5	
HD 93521				93521	52849	10^{h} 48^{m} 23.51^{s}	+37° 34′ 13.1″	7.03		3800	O9Vp	unusual high-galactic-latitude O-type star
HD 87883				87883	49699	10^{h} 08^{m} 43.14^{s}	+34° 14′ 32.1″	7.56	6.28	59	K0V	has a planet (b)
51 LMi		51		96094	54196	11^{h} 05^{m} 15.73^{s}	+25° 12′ 07.4″	7.60	3.71	195	G0	
HD 82886				82886	47087	09^{h} 35^{m} 45^{s}	+34° 46′ 51″	7.78		408	G0	Illyrian, has a planet (b)
VW LMi			VW	95660	54003	11^{h} 02^{m} 51.91^{s}	+30° 24′ 54.7″	8.06		436	F5V	W UMa variable
T LMi			T		48106	09^{h} 48^{m} 28.46^{s}	+33° 17′ 19.6″	11.06		682	A0	Algol variable, V_{max} = 10.87^{m}, V_{min} = 12.92^{m}, P = 3.019885 d
RT LMi			RT			09^{h} 49^{m} 48.32^{s}	+34° 27′ 15.4″	11.35		1060	F7V	W UMa variable
V LMi			V			10^{h} 25^{m} 25.59^{s}	+28° 47′ 07.7″	11.98			A8	RR Lyr variable, V_{max} = 11.1^{m}, V_{min} = 12.23^{m}, P = 0.5439187 d
X LMi			X			10^{h} 03^{m} 06.73^{s}	+39° 21′ 28.5″	12.30			A5...	RR Lyr variable, V_{max} = 11.76^{m}, V_{min} = 12.81^{m}, P = 0.6843086 d
CIT 6			RW			10^{h} 16^{m} 02.27^{s}	+30° 34′ 18.6″	12.80			C3,4eV	semiregular variable, V_{max} = 12.8^{m}, V_{min} = 16.5^{m}, P = 640 d
ST LMi			ST			11^{h} 05^{m} 39.77^{s}	+29° 06′ 28.5″	15.10			DH+M	AM Her variable, V_{max} = 14.4^{m}, V_{min} = 18.5^{m}, P = 0.07908903 d
G 117-B15A			RY			09^{h} 24^{m} 15.27^{s}	+35° 16′ 51.3″	15.52		270	DA4.0	ZZ Cet variable, ΔV = 0.13^{m}, P = 0.002491 d
SX LMi			SX			10^{h} 54^{m} 30.42^{s}	+30° 06′ 10.2″	17		1170	CV	SU UMa variable, V_{max} = 13.0^{m}, V_{min} = 17.4^{m}, P = 0.06717 d
YZ LMi			YZ			09^{h} 26^{m} 38.73^{s}	+36° 24′ 02.46″	19.33		2657±450	DB	Eclipsing binary+AM CVn star
RZ LMi			RZ			09^{h} 51^{m} 48.94^{s}	+34° 07′ 23.9″				CV	ER UMa variable
WX LMi			WX			10^{h} 27^{m} 27.52^{s}	+38° 45′ 04.2″					AM Her variable
Table legend: • Name = Proper name • B = Bayer designation • F or/and G. = Flamsteed designation or Gould designation • Var = Variable star designation • HD = Henry Draper Catalogue designation number • HIP = Hipparcos Catalogue designation number • RA = Right ascension for the Epoch/Equinox J2000.0 • Dec = Declination for the Epoch/Equinox J2000.0 • vis. mag. = visual magnitude (m or m_{v}), also known as apparent magnitude • abs. mag. = absolute magnitude (M_{v}) • Dist. (ly) = Distance in light-years from Earth • Sp. class = Spectral class of the star in the stellar classification system • Notes = Common name(s) or alternate name(s); comments; notable properties [for example: multiple star status, range of variability if it is a variable star, exoplanets, etc.]

== See also ==
- List of stars by constellation
