= Leo Minor in Chinese astronomy =

The modern constellation Leo Minor lies across one of the quadrants symbolized by the Vermilion Bird of the South (南方朱雀, Nán Fāng Zhū Què), and Three Enclosures (三垣, Sān Yuán), that divide the sky in traditional Chinese uranography.

The name of the western constellation in modern Chinese is 小獅座 (xiǎo shī zuò), meaning "the small lion constellation".

== Stars ==
The map of Chinese constellation in constellation Leo Minor area consists of :

Enclosures	Enclosure (Chinese name)	Romanization	Translation	Asterisms (Chinese name)	Romanization	Translation	Western star name	Proper Name	Chinese star name	Romanization	Translation
Three Enclosures (三垣)	紫微垣	Zǐ Wēi Yuán	Purple Forbidden enclosure	勢	Shì	Eunuch					
Three Enclosures (三垣)	紫微垣	Zǐ Wēi Yuán	Purple Forbidden enclosure	勢	Shì	Eunuch	34 LMi		勢一	Shìyī	1st star
Three Enclosures (三垣)	紫微垣	Zǐ Wēi Yuán	Purple Forbidden enclosure	勢	Shì	Eunuch	33 LMi		勢二	Shìèr	2nd star
Three Enclosures (三垣)	紫微垣	Zǐ Wēi Yuán	Purple Forbidden enclosure	勢	Shì	Eunuch	42 LMi		勢三	Shìsān	3rd star
Three Enclosures (三垣)	紫微垣	Zǐ Wēi Yuán	Purple Forbidden enclosure	勢	Shì	Eunuch	46 LMi	Praecipua	勢四	Shìsì	4th star
Three Enclosures (三垣)	紫微垣	Zǐ Wēi Yuán	Purple Forbidden enclosure	勢	Shì	Eunuch	35 LMi		勢增一	Shìzēngyī	1st additional star
Three Enclosures (三垣)	紫微垣	Zǐ Wēi Yuán	Purple Forbidden enclosure	勢	Shì	Eunuch	38 LMi		勢增二	Shìzēngèr	2nd additional star
Three Enclosures (三垣)	紫微垣	Zǐ Wēi Yuán	Purple Forbidden enclosure	勢	Shì	Eunuch	32 LMi		勢增三	Shìzēngsān	3rd additional star
Three Enclosures (三垣)	紫微垣	Zǐ Wēi Yuán	Purple Forbidden enclosure	勢	Shì	Eunuch	β LMi		勢增四	Shìzēngsì	4th additional star
Three Enclosures (三垣)	紫微垣	Zǐ Wēi Yuán	Purple Forbidden enclosure	勢	Shì	Eunuch	29 LMi		勢增五	Shìzēngwǔ	5th additional star
Three Enclosures (三垣)	紫微垣	Zǐ Wēi Yuán	Purple Forbidden enclosure	勢	Shì	Eunuch	26 LMi		勢增六	Shìzēngliù	6th additional star
Three Enclosures (三垣)	紫微垣	Zǐ Wēi Yuán	Purple Forbidden enclosure	勢	Shì	Eunuch	27 LMi		勢增七	Shìzēngqī	7th additional star
Three Enclosures (三垣)	紫微垣	Zǐ Wēi Yuán	Purple Forbidden enclosure	勢	Shì	Eunuch	28 LMi		勢增八	Shìzēngbā	8th additional star
Three Enclosures (三垣)	紫微垣	Zǐ Wēi Yuán	Purple Forbidden enclosure	勢	Shì	Eunuch	30 LMi		勢增九	Shìzēngjiǔ	9th additional star
Three Enclosures (三垣)	紫微垣	Zǐ Wēi Yuán	Purple Forbidden enclosure	勢	Shì	Eunuch	36 LMi		勢增十	Shìzēngshí	10th additional star
Three Enclosures (三垣)	紫微垣	Zǐ Wēi Yuán	Purple Forbidden enclosure	勢	Shì	Eunuch	37 LMi		勢增十一	Shìzēngshíyī	11th additional star
Three Enclosures (三垣)	紫微垣	Zǐ Wēi Yuán	Purple Forbidden enclosure	勢	Shì	Eunuch	43 LMi		勢增十四	Shìzēngshísì	14th additional star
Three Enclosures (三垣)	紫微垣	Zǐ Wēi Yuán	Purple Forbidden enclosure	勢	Shì	Eunuch	44 LMi		勢增十五	Shìzēngshíwǔ	15th additional star
Three Enclosures (三垣)	太微垣	Tài Wēi Yuán	Supreme Palace enclosure								
Three Enclosures (三垣)	太微垣	Tài Wēi Yuán	Supreme Palace enclosure	三台	Sāntái	Three Steps	19 LMi		中台增二	Zhōngtáizēngèr	2nd additional star in Middle Step
Three Enclosures (三垣)	太微垣	Tài Wēi Yuán	Supreme Palace enclosure	少微	Shǎowēi	Junior Officers					
Three Enclosures (三垣)	太微垣	Tài Wēi Yuán	Supreme Palace enclosure	少微	Shǎowēi	Junior Officers	41 LMi		少微三	Shǎowēisān	3rd star
Three Enclosures (三垣)	太微垣	Tài Wēi Yuán	Supreme Palace enclosure	少微	Shǎowēi	Junior Officers	39 LMi		少微增一	Shǎowēizēngyī	1st additional star
Three Enclosures (三垣)	太微垣	Tài Wēi Yuán	Supreme Palace enclosure	少微	Shǎowēi	Junior Officers	40 LMi		少微增二	Shǎowēizēngèr	2nd additional star
Three Enclosures (三垣)	太微垣	Tài Wēi Yuán	Supreme Palace enclosure	少微	Shǎowēi	Junior Officers	48 LMi		少微增三	Shǎowēizēngsān	3rd additional star
Three Enclosures (三垣)	太微垣	Tài Wēi Yuán	Supreme Palace enclosure	少微	Shǎowēi	Junior Officers	50 LMi		少微增四	Shǎowēizēngsì	4th additional star
Three Enclosures (三垣)	太微垣	Tài Wēi Yuán	Supreme Palace enclosure	少微	Shǎowēi	Junior Officers	51 LMi		少微增五	Shǎowēizēngwǔ	5th additional star
Vermilion Bird of the South(南方朱雀)	柳	Xīng	Star	軒轅	Xuānyuán	Xuanyuan					
Vermilion Bird of the South(南方朱雀)	柳	Xīng	Star	軒轅	Xuānyuán	Xuanyuan	8 LMi		軒轅增一	Xuanyuanzēngyī	1st additional star
Vermilion Bird of the South(南方朱雀)	柳	Xīng	Star	軒轅	Xuānyuán	Xuanyuan	7 LMi		軒轅增二	Xuanyuanzēngèr	2nd additional star
Vermilion Bird of the South(南方朱雀)	柳	Xīng	Star	內平	Nèipíng	High Judge					
Vermilion Bird of the South(南方朱雀)	柳	Xīng	Star	內平	Nèipíng	High Judge	22 LMi		內平一	Nèipíngyī	1st star
Vermilion Bird of the South(南方朱雀)	柳	Xīng	Star	內平	Nèipíng	High Judge	21 LMi		內平二	Nèipíngèr	2nd star
Vermilion Bird of the South(南方朱雀)	柳	Xīng	Star	內平	Nèipíng	High Judge	13 LMi		內平三	Nèipíngsān	3rd star
Vermilion Bird of the South(南方朱雀)	柳	Xīng	Star	內平	Nèipíng	High Judge	HD 86012		內平四	Nèipíngsì	4th star
Vermilion Bird of the South(南方朱雀)	柳	Xīng	Star	內平	Nèipíng	High Judge	17 LMi		内平增一	Nèipíngzēngyī	1st additional star
Vermilion Bird of the South(南方朱雀)	柳	Xīng	Star	內平	Nèipíng	High Judge	16 LMi		内平增二	Nèipíngzēngèr	2nd additional star
Vermilion Bird of the South(南方朱雀)	柳	Xīng	Star	內平	Nèipíng	High Judge	9 LMi		内平增五	Nèipíngzēngwǔ	5th additional star
Vermilion Bird of the South(南方朱雀)	柳	Xīng	Star	內平	Nèipíng	High Judge	10 LMi		内平增六	Nèipíngzēngliù	6th additional star
Vermilion Bird of the South(南方朱雀)	柳	Xīng	Star	內平	Nèipíng	High Judge	11 LMi		内平增七	Nèipíngzēngqī	7th additional star
Vermilion Bird of the South(南方朱雀)	柳	Xīng	Star	內平	Nèipíng	High Judge	HD 83525		内平增八	Nèipíngzēngbā	8th additional star
Vermilion Bird of the South(南方朱雀)	柳	Xīng	Star	內平	Nèipíng	High Judge	20 LMi		内平增九	Nèipíngzēngjiǔ	9th additional star
Vermilion Bird of the South(南方朱雀)	柳	Xīng	Star	內平	Nèipíng	High Judge	23 LMi		内平增十	Nèipíngzēngshí	10th additional star
Vermilion Bird of the South(南方朱雀)	柳	Xīng	Star	內平	Nèipíng	High Judge	24 LMi		内平增十一	Nèipíngzēngshíyī	11th additional star

== See also ==
- Traditional Chinese star names
- Chinese constellations
