= VW Leonis Minoris =

Star system in the constellation Leo Minor

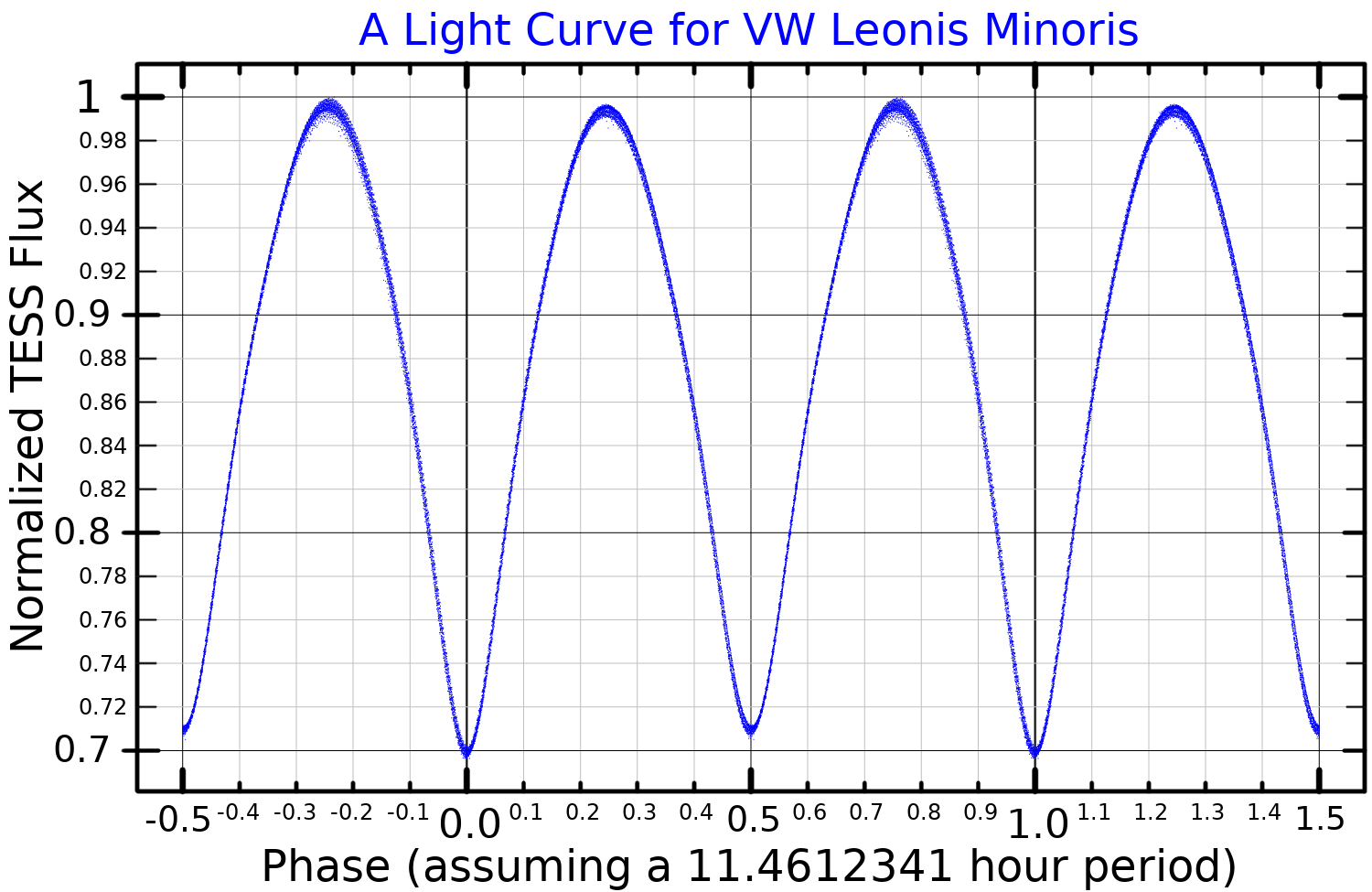
- A light curve VW Leonis Minoris, plotted from TESS data

Observation data Epoch J2000.0 Equinox ICRS
- Constellation: Leo Minor
- Right ascension: 11^{h} 02^{m} 51.910^{s}
- Declination: 30° 24′ 54.70″
- Apparent magnitude (V): 8.07

Characteristics
- Spectral type: F2V + G2V
- B−V color index: +0.410±0.015
- Variable type: Suspected W UMa

Astrometry
Radial velocity (R_{v})	+5.00±0.75 km/s
Proper motion (μ)	RA: +12.304 mas/yr Dec.: −4.764 mas/yr
Parallax (π)	8.8238±0.1046 mas
Distance	370 ± 4 ly (113 ± 1 pc)
Absolute magnitude (M_{V})	2.46

Orbit – Contact (1 & 2)
Period (P)	11.461225 h
Eccentricity (e)	0.0
Semi-amplitude (K_{1}) (primary)	105.8±1.0 km/s
Semi-amplitude (K_{2}) (secondary)	250.2±1.2 km/s

Orbit – Non-contact (3 & 4)
Period (P)	7.93063 d
Eccentricity (e)	0.035±0.003
Periastron epoch (T)	2,452,274.54±0.11 HJD
Argument of periastron (ω) (secondary)	1.90±0.09°
Semi-amplitude (K_{1}) (primary)	63.99±0.23 km/s
Semi-amplitude (K_{2}) (secondary)	65.53±0.27 km/s

Orbit – Mutual (12 & 34)
Period (P)	355.02±0.17 d
Eccentricity (e)	0.097±0.011
Periastron epoch (T)	2,453,046±6 HJD
Argument of periastron (ω) (secondary)	2.20±0.12°
Semi-amplitude (K_{1}) (primary)	21.61±0.49 km/s
Semi-amplitude (K_{2}) (secondary)	23.22±0.33 km/s

Details

Component 1
Mass	1.68±0.02 M_{☉}
Radius	1.69±0.02 R_{☉}
Luminosity	8.73 L_{☉}
Surface gravity (log g)	4.21±0.02 cgs

Component 2
Mass	0.71±0.02 M_{☉}
Radius	1.18±0.02 R_{☉}
Surface gravity (log g)	4.14±0.02 cgs

Other designations
- VW LMi, BD+31°2225, HD 95660, HIP 54003, SAO 62372

Database references
SIMBAD	data

VW Leo Minoris is a tight quadruple star system, located in the constellation of Leo Minor. With a peak combined apparent visual magnitude of 8.07, it is too faint to be seen with the naked eye. Parallax measurements give a distance estimate of approximately 370 light years from the Sun, and it is drifting further away with a radial velocity of +5 km/s.

Component 1
Period = 0.48 d
Component 2
Period = 355.02 d
Component 3
Period = 7.93 d
Component 4

Hierarchy of orbits

This system was found to be variable using observations with the Hipparcos satellite. It is classified as an A-type W Ursae Majoris eclipsing binary, where the two stars share a common envelope. The eclipse of the primary causes the magnitude of the system to drop to 8.45. These components (1 & 2) have an orbital period of 11.4611 hours and the orbital plane has an inclination of 72.4° to the line of sight from the Earth. They have a combined stellar classification of F2V, matching an F-type main sequence star.

In 2006 an additional, detached binary component was discovered, making this a quadruple star system. This binary has an orbital period of 7.93 days, a mild eccentricity (ovalness) of 0.04, and it shows an apsidal precession with a period of 78.6±1.6 years. The components (3 & 4) have a combined stellar class of G2V, showing a match with a G-type main-sequence star.

The two binaries (1–2 & 3–4) orbit each other with a period of 355 days and an eccentricity of 0.1. The plane of their orbit is close to coplanar (within 5°) with the orbital plane of the detached binary. This outer orbit appears stable, suggesting there is no additional outlying component to this system. The nearby ninth magnitude star HD 95606 (HIP 53969) shares a common proper motion with this system and may be loosely gravitationally bound. They likely all formed in the same protostellar cloud.
