= HD 88231 =

Suspected variable; Leo Minor

- Location of HD 88231 on the map (circled)

Observation data Epoch J2000.0 Equinox ICRS
- Constellation: Leo Minor
- Right ascension: 10^{h} 11^{m} 12.77777^{s}
- Declination: +37° 24′ 06.8383″
- Apparent magnitude (V): 5.84 (5.79 - 5.88)

Characteristics
- Evolutionary stage: red giant branch
- Spectral type: K3 III
- B−V color index: +1.29
- Variable type: suspected

Astrometry
| Radial velocity (R_{v}) | 7.38±0.22 km/s |
| Proper motion (μ) | RA: −20.679 mas/yr Dec.: −29.496 mas/yr |
| Parallax (π) | 5.7353±0.0663 mas |
| Distance | 569 ± 7 ly (174 ± 2 pc) |
| Absolute magnitude (M_{V}) | −0.59 |

Details
| Mass | 1.17 M_{☉} |
| Radius | 24.9±1.3 R_{☉} |
| Luminosity | 228±5 L_{☉} |
| Surface gravity (log g) | 1.76^{+0.10}_{−0.06} cgs |
| Temperature | 4,487±122 K |
| Metallicity [Fe/H] | +0.05 dex |

Other designations
- NSV 4764, AG+37°1046, BD+38°2110, FK5 2817, GC 13985, HD 88231, HIP 49893, HR 3993, SAO 61914

Database references
| SIMBAD | data |

HD 88231, also known as HR 3993, is a solitary orange-hued star located in the northern constellation Leo Minor. It has an apparent magnitude of 5.84, making it faintly visible to the naked eye under ideal conditions. Gaia DR3 parallax measurements imply a distance of about 569 light-years, and the object is currently receding with a heliocentric radial velocity of 7.38 km/s. At its current distance, HD 88231's brightness is diminished by 0.17 magnitudes due to interstellar extinction and it has an absolute magnitude of −0.59.

The object has a stellar classification of K3 III, indicating that it is an evolved red giant star. It has a comparable mass to the Sun but it has expanded to 24.9 times the radius of the Sun. It radiates 228 times the luminosity of the Sun from its enlarged photosphere at an effective temperature of 4,487 K. HD 88231 is slightly metal enriched with an iron abundance 112% that of the Sun ([Fe/H] = +0.05).

HD 88231 was suspected to be variable in the K-band based on Two-Micron Sky Survey observations in 1969. A 1994 paper found that it ranges from 5.79 to 5.88 in the visual band. As of 2004 however, the variability has not been confirmed.
