= HD 87883 b =

Extrasolar planet in the constellation Leo Minor

Discovery
- Discovery date: August 13, 2009
- Detection method: Radial velocity

Orbital characteristics
- Apastron: 6.48 AU (969,000,000 km)
- Periastron: 1.06 AU (159,000,000 km)
- Semi-major axis: 3.77+0.12 −0.094 AU
- Eccentricity: 0.720+0.038 −0.027
- Orbital period (sidereal): 8.23+0.32 −0.34 yr
- Inclination: 16.8+1.7 −1.4 or 163.2+1.4 −1.7
- Longitude of ascending node: 109.9+4.0 −4.1
- Time of periastron: 2456913+17 −16
- Argument of periastron: 282.1±3.7
- Star: HD 87883

Physical characteristics
- Mass: 6.31+0.31 −0.32

HD 87883 b is an extrasolar planet which orbits HD 87883, a K-type star on the main sequence, approximately 59 light years from Earth in the constellation of Leo Minor. It is a long-period planet, taking 8.23 years to orbit the star at the average distance of 3.77 AU in a very eccentric path, which ranges distance from 1.06 AU to 6.48 AU. It was detected by the radial velocity method on August 13, 2009.

Astrometry of HD 87883 has determined an orbital inclination of either 16.8° or 163.2°, depending on whether the solution is prograde or retrograde. This, combined with the minimum mass, gives a true mass of 6.31 M_{J} (Jupiter masses).
