= HD 87822 =

Binary star system in the constellation Leo Minor

Observation data Epoch J2000 Equinox ICRS
- Constellation: Leo Minor
- AB
- Right ascension: 10^{h} 08^{m} 15.88717^{s}
- Declination: +31° 36′ 14.5875″
- Apparent magnitude (V): 6.240 (6.90 + 7.20)
- C
- Right ascension: 10^{h} 08^{m} 16.16565^{s}
- Declination: +31° 35′ 47.1421″
- Apparent magnitude (V): 13.8

Characteristics

AB
- Spectral type: F4V
- U−B color index: +0.01
- B−V color index: +0.445

C
- Spectral type: dMs1.5

Astrometry

AB
Radial velocity (R_{v})	−8.0 km/s
Proper motion (μ)	RA: −80.47 mas/yr Dec.: −92.07 mas/yr
Parallax (π)	16.33±0.42 mas
Distance	200 ± 5 ly (61 ± 2 pc)
Absolute magnitude (M_{V})	2.23

C
Radial velocity (R_{v})	−5.77 km/s
Proper motion (μ)	RA: −80.484 mas/yr Dec.: −87.851 mas/yr
Parallax (π)	16.0212±0.0186 mas
Distance	203.6 ± 0.2 ly (62.42 ± 0.07 pc)

Orbit
Primary	A
Name	B
Period (P)	17.765±0.036 yr
Semi-major axis (a)	0.1560±0.0005″
Eccentricity (e)	0.3960±0.0038
Inclination (i)	84.59±0.20°
Longitude of the node (Ω)	349.57±0.15°
Periastron epoch (T)	B 1989.133±0.042
Argument of periastron (ω) (secondary)	7.73±0.95°

Details

A
Mass	1.45 M_{☉}
Surface gravity (log g)	4.18 cgs
Temperature	6,533 K
Metallicity [Fe/H]	0.10 dex
Rotational velocity (v sin i)	8 km/s
Age	1.6 Gyr

B
Mass	1.38 M_{☉}

C
Mass	0.53 M_{☉}
Radius	0.53 R_{☉}
Luminosity	0.04 L_{☉}
Surface gravity (log g)	4.71 cgs
Temperature	3,610 K
Metallicity [Fe/H]	−0.31 dex

Other designations
- BD+32°1982, HD 87822, HIP 49658, HR 3979, SAO 61882.

Database references
SIMBAD	data

HD 87822 is a triple star in the northern constellation of Leo Minor. The inner pair orbit each other with a period of about 18 years.
