= HD 87883 =

Star in the constellation Leo Minor

Observation data Epoch J2000.0 Equinox ICRS
- Constellation: Leo Minor
- Right ascension: 10^{h} 08^{m} 43.14059^{s}
- Declination: +34° 14′ 32.1466″
- Apparent magnitude (V): 7.56

Characteristics
- Evolutionary stage: main sequence
- Spectral type: K0V
- Apparent magnitude (B): 8.525
- Apparent magnitude (J): 5.839±0.020
- Apparent magnitude (H): 5.441±0.046
- Apparent magnitude (K): 5.314±0.020
- B−V color index: 0.965±0.013

Astrometry
| Radial velocity (R_{v}) | +9.320±0.003 km/s |
| Proper motion (μ) | RA: −64.293±0.027 mas/yr Dec.: −61.438±0.025 mas/yr |
| Parallax (π) | 54.6678±0.0295 mas |
| Distance | 59.66 ± 0.03 ly (18.292 ± 0.010 pc) |
| Absolute magnitude (M_{V}) | 6.27 |

Details
| Mass | 0.80±0.02 M_{☉} |
| Radius | 0.76±0.03 R_{☉} |
| Luminosity | 0.338±0.008 L_{☉} |
| Surface gravity (log g) | 4.56 cgs |
| Temperature | 4,980±44 K |
| Metallicity [Fe/H] | 0.093±0.04 dex |
| Rotation | 38.6 days |
| Rotational velocity (v sin i) | 2.17±0.50 km/s |
| Age | 7.6+2.8 −1.8 Gyr |

Other designations
- BD+34°2089, HD 87883, HIP 49699, SAO 61890, PPM 75021

Database references
| SIMBAD | data |
| Exoplanet Archive | data |
| ARICNS | data |

HD 87883 is star in the northern constellation of Leo Minor. It is too faint to be viewed with the naked eye, having an apparent visual magnitude of 7.56. The star is located at a distance of 59.7 light years from the Sun based on parallax, and is drifting further away with a radial velocity of +9.3 km/s. It has an absolute magnitude of 6.27.

This is an ordinary K-type main-sequence star with a stellar classification of K0V. It has a modest level of chromospheric activity, and is rotating with a period of 38.6 days. The star is smaller than the Sun, with 82% of the mass of the Sun and 76% of the Sun's radius. The age of this star is 9.8 billion years, compared with 4.6 billion years for the Sun. It is radiating 32% of the luminosity of the Sun from its photosphere at an effective temperature of 4,980 K.

In August 2009, this star was found to have a planet via the radial velocity method. The orbital solution shows it to be a Super-Jupiter body in an elliptical orbit with a period of 7.54 yr and a typical separation of 3.6 AU. A relatively high deviation on the model fit suggests there may be an additional planetary companion in a close, perturbing orbit of the star. The orbital parameters of the known planet do not preclude the existence of an Earth-mass planet with a dynamically-stable orbit in the habitable zone. Since its orbit is relatively face-on, its true mass deviates significantly from its minimum mass, at 6.31+0.31
−0.32 M_{J}.

The HD 87883 planetary system
| Companion (in order from star) | Mass | Semimajor axis (AU) | Orbital period (years) | Eccentricity | Inclination (°) | Radius |
|---|---|---|---|---|---|---|
| b | 6.31+0.31 −0.32 M_{J} | 3.77+0.12 −0.094 | 8.23+0.32 −0.34 | 0.720+0.038 −0.027 | 16.8+1.7 −1.4 | — |

== See also ==
- List of extrasolar planets
