= 23 Leonis Minoris =

Star in the constellation of Leo Minor

- Location of 23 LMi (circled)

Observation data Epoch J2000.0 Equinox ICRS
- Constellation: Leo Minor
- Right ascension: 10^{h} 16^{m} 14.43013^{s}
- Declination: +29° 18′ 37.7075″
- Apparent magnitude (V): 5.49±0.01

Characteristics
- Evolutionary stage: main sequence star
- Spectral type: A0 Vn
- U−B color index: 0.00
- B−V color index: +0.01

Astrometry
Radial velocity (R_{v})	16.4±2.8 km/s
Proper motion (μ)	RA: −70.765 mas/yr Dec.: −22.844 mas/yr
Parallax (π)	11.6971±0.0923 mas
Distance	279 ± 2 ly (85.5 ± 0.7 pc)
Absolute magnitude (M_{V})	+0.98

Details
Mass	2.55 M_{☉}
Radius	2.38±0.23 R_{☉}
Luminosity	44.3±2.1 L_{☉}
Surface gravity (log g)	4.14±0.07 cgs
Temperature	10,377±353 K
Metallicity [Fe/H]	0.00 dex
Rotational velocity (v sin i)	235±15 km/s
Age	285^{+24}_{−22} Myr

Other designations
- 7 H. Leonis Minoris, 23 LMi, AG+29°1104, BD+30°1981, FK5 2823, GC 14086, HD 88960, HIP 50303, HR 4024, SAO 81258

Database references
SIMBAD	data

23 Leonis Minoris (23 LMi) is a solitary, bluish-white hued star located in the northern constellation Leo Minor. It is positioned 7° south and 11" west from β Leonis Minoris. It is rarely called 7 H. Leonis Minoris, which is its Hevelius designation.

The object has an apparent magnitude of 5.49, allowing it to be faintly visible to the naked eye. Based on parallax measurements from the Gaia satellite, it is estimated to be 279 light years distant. 23 LMi is receding from the Solar System with a fairly constrained radial velocity of 16 km/s. At its current distance, the star's brightness is diminished by a tenth of a magnitude due to interstellar dust. 23 LMi's kinematics matches that of the Hyades moving group and it is considered a probable member.

23 LMi was catalogued as a chemically peculiar star with a stellar classification of A0 Vpn due to a lack of magnesium in its spectrum by Helmut Abt and Nidia Irene Morrell. However, A.P. Cowley and colleagues instead listed it as an ordinary A-type main-sequence star with nebulous absorption lines as a result of rapid rotation, with the class being A0 Vn. It has 2.55 times the mass of the Sun and is said to be 285 million years old, having completed 60.8% of its main sequence lifetime. It has double the radius of the Sun and shines with a luminosity 44.3 times that of the Sun from its photosphere at an effective temperature of 10,377 K. 42 LMi is currently spinning rapidly with a projected rotational velocity of 235 km/s.
