= 30 Leonis Minoris =

Star in the constellation Leo Minor

- Location of 30 Leonis Minoris (circled)

Observation data Epoch J2000 Equinox J2000
- Constellation: Leo Minor
- Right ascension: 10^{h} 25^{m} 54.81535^{s}
- Declination: +33° 47′ 46.0309″
- Apparent magnitude (V): 4.72

Characteristics
- Evolutionary stage: subgiant
- Spectral type: kF0hF2mF2 or A9IIIa
- U−B color index: +0.18
- B−V color index: +0.25

Astrometry
Radial velocity (R_{v})	+13.70 km/s
Proper motion (μ)	RA: −73.66 mas/yr Dec.: −59.21 mas/yr
Parallax (π)	13.98±0.21 mas
Distance	233 ± 4 ly (72 ± 1 pc)
Absolute magnitude (M_{V})	0.45

Details
Mass	2.28 M_{☉}
Radius	4.182 R_{☉}
Luminosity	58 L_{☉}
Surface gravity (log g)	3.82 cgs
Temperature	7,292 K
Metallicity [Fe/H]	+0.19 dex
Rotational velocity (v sin i)	34 km/s

Other designations
- 30 LMi, BD+34°2128, GC 14315, HD 90277, HIP 51056, HR 4090, SAO 62038

Database references
SIMBAD	data

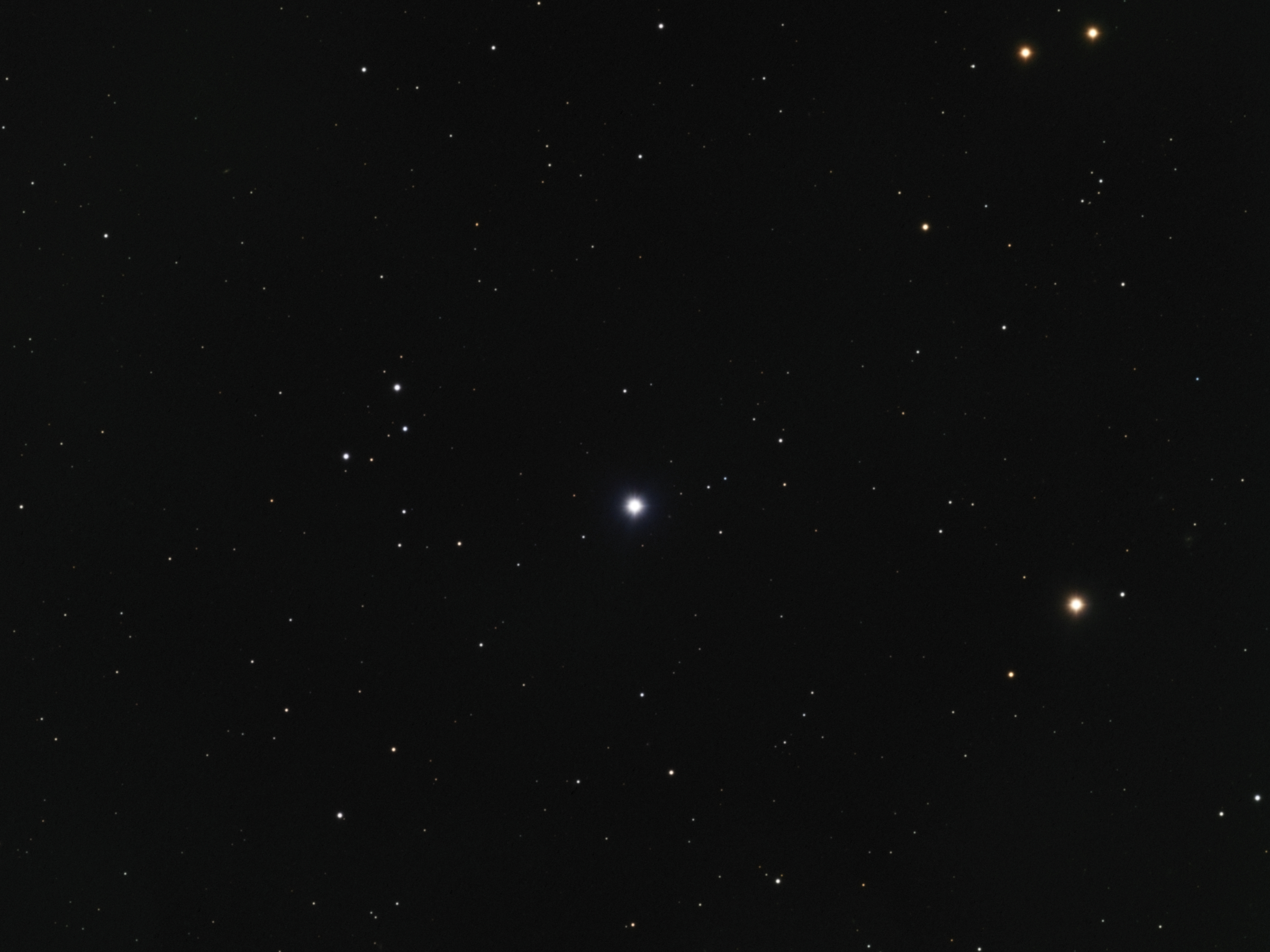
30 Leonis Minoris in optical light

30 Leonis Minoris is a single star in the northern constellation of Leo Minor. It is visible to the naked eye as a faint, white-hued point of light with an apparent visual magnitude of 4.72. The distance to this star, as estimated from parallax measurements, is 233 light years. It is drifting away from the Earth with a heliocentric radial velocity of +13.7 km/s.

This object has been catalogued as an Am star and was given a stellar classification of kF0hF2mF2 by Abt and Morrell (1995). This notation indicates the calcium K line matches an F0 star, while the hydrogen and metal lines fit an F2 star. However, Gray et al. (2001) assigned it a class of A9IIIa, matching an A-type giant star. In stellar evolutionary terms, it is on the subgiant branch, having left the main sequence, and on its way to becoming a red giant.

30 Leonis Minoris has 2.3 times the mass of the Sun and 4.2 times the Sun's radius. It has a moderate rate of spin, showing a projected rotational velocity of 34 km/s. The star is radiating 58 times the Sun's luminosity from its photosphere at an effective temperature of 7,292 K.
