= 10 Leonis Minoris =

Star in the constellation Leo Minor

- Location of 10 Leonis Minoris (circled)

Observation data Epoch J2000 Equinox J2000
- Constellation: Leo Minor
- Right ascension: 09^{h} 34^{m} 13.38184^{s}
- Declination: +36° 23′ 51.2090″
- Apparent magnitude (V): 4.54

Characteristics
- Evolutionary stage: horizontal branch
- Spectral type: G8.5 III
- U−B color index: +0.61
- B−V color index: +0.92
- Variable type: RS CVn

Astrometry
Radial velocity (R_{v})	−11.94 km/s
Proper motion (μ)	RA: +6.989 mas/yr Dec.: −22.729 mas/yr
Parallax (π)	17.0738±0.1341 mas
Distance	191 ± 2 ly (58.6 ± 0.5 pc)
Absolute magnitude (M_{V})	0.83

Details
Mass	2.12 M_{☉}
Radius	8.74±0.29 R_{☉}
Luminosity	46.44±1.65 L_{☉}
Surface gravity (log g)	2.93 cgs
Temperature	5,075 K
Metallicity [Fe/H]	−0.04 dex
Rotational velocity (v sin i)	4.7 km/s
Age	557 Myr

Other designations
- 10 LMi, SU Leonis Minoris, BD+37°2004, FK5 360, GC 13203, HD 82635, HIP 46952, HR 3800, SAO 61570

Database references
SIMBAD	data

10 Leonis Minoris is a single variable star in the northern constellation Leo Minor, located approximately 191 light years away based on parallax. It has the variable star designation SU Leonis Minoris; 10 Leonis Minoris is the Flamsteed designation. This body is visible to the naked eye as a faint, orange-hued star with a baseline apparent visual magnitude of 4.54. It is moving closer to the Earth with a heliocentric radial velocity of −12 km/s.

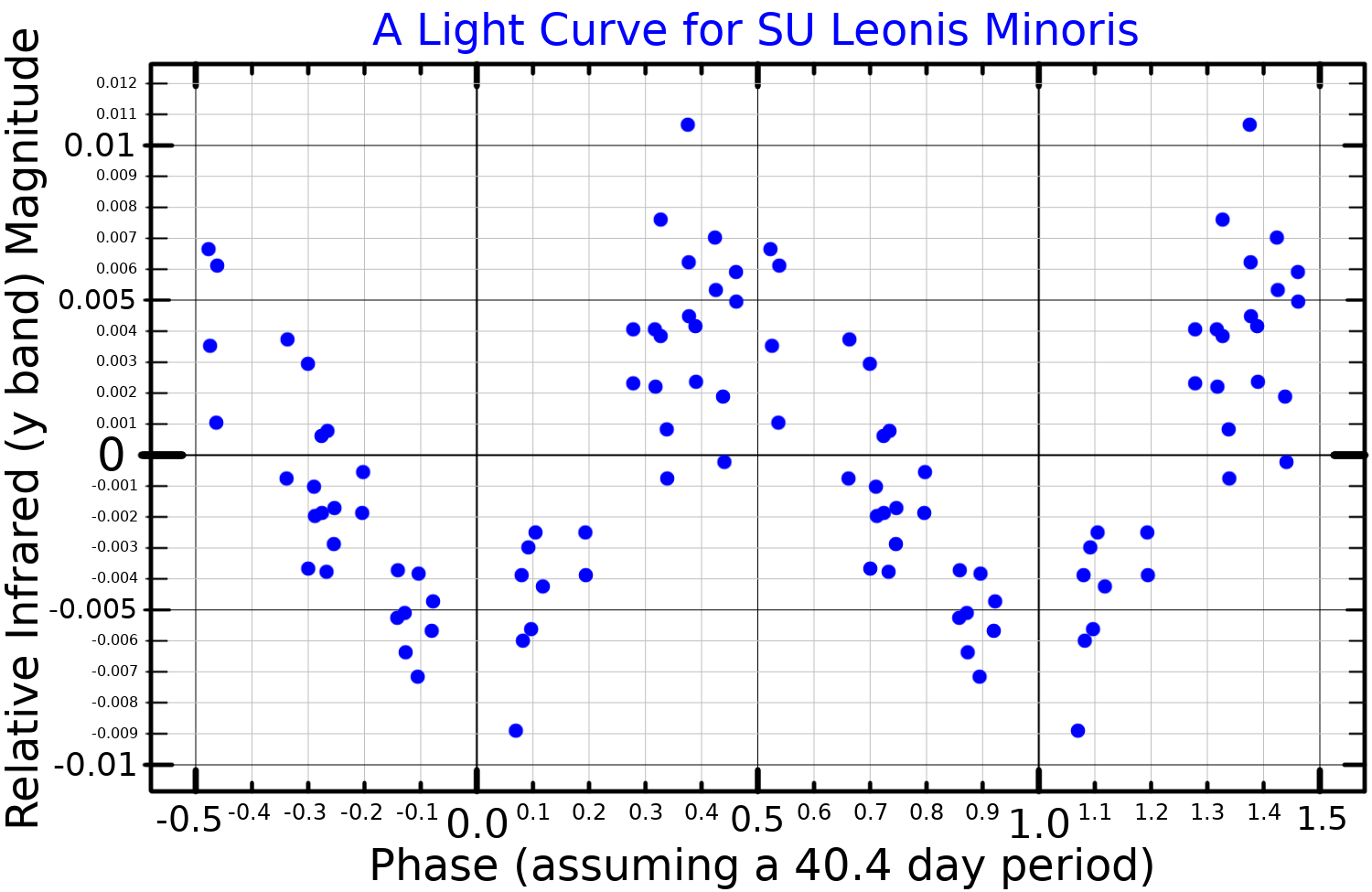
A y band light curve for SU Leonis Minoris, adapted from Skiff and Lockwood (1986)

This is an evolved giant star with a stellar classification of G8.5 III. It is reported as a RS CVn variable with magnitude varying by 0.02 mag. and showing a high level of chromospheric activity. The star has around 2.1 times the mass of the Sun and has expanded to 8.7 times the Sun's radius. It is radiating 46 times the luminosity of the Sun from its enlarged photosphere at an effective temperature of 5,075 K.
