= 7 Leonis Minoris =

G-type giant in the constellation Leo Minor

- Location of 7 LMi on the map (circled)

Observation data Epoch J2000 Equinox ICRS
- Constellation: Leo Minor
- Right ascension: 09^{h} 30^{m} 43.22705^{s}
- Declination: +33° 39′ 20.5700″
- Apparent magnitude (V): 5.86±0.01

Characteristics
- Evolutionary stage: horizontal branch
- Spectral type: G9 III
- B−V color index: +1.05

Astrometry
| Radial velocity (R_{v}) | 1.7±0.9 km/s |
| Proper motion (μ) | RA: −23.939 mas/yr Dec.: −48.160 mas/yr |
| Parallax (π) | 7.0542±0.1338 mas |
| Distance | 462 ± 9 ly (142 ± 3 pc) |
| Absolute magnitude (M_{V}) | −0.03 |

Details
| Mass | 2.74^{+0.24}_{−0.25} M_{☉} |
| Radius | 13.41±0.68 R_{☉} |
| Luminosity | 96.0^{+3.3}_{−3.6} L_{☉} |
| Surface gravity (log g) | 2.49^{+0.07}_{−0.06} cgs |
| Temperature | 4,923±122 K |
| Metallicity [Fe/H] | −0.03±0.10 dex |
| Rotational velocity (v sin i) | 0.24 km/s |
| Age | 575^{+201}_{−139} Myr |

Other designations
- 7 LMi, AG+33°953, BD+34°1999, FK5 2755, GC 13112, HD 82087, HIP 46652, HR 3764, SAO 61529, CCDM J09307+3339A, WDS J09307+3339A, TIC 8855140

Database references
| SIMBAD | data |

7 Leonis Minoris (7 LMi) is a star located in the northern constellation Leo Minor. It is also designated as HD 82087 and HR 3764. 7 LMi is faintly visible to the naked eye as a yellow-hued point of light with an apparent magnitude of 5.86. Gaia DR3 parallax measurements imply a distance of 462 light-years and it is currently receding with a heliocentric radial velocity of 1.7 km/s. At its current distance, 7 LMi's brightness is diminished by 0.12 magnitudes due to interstellar extinction and it has an absolute magnitude of −0.03.

There have been disagreements on the object's stellar classification. 7 LMi is either a G-type giant star with a class of either G8 or G9 III, or it is a K-type giant with a class of K0 III. It is most likely on the horizontal branch (95% fit), generating energy via helium fusion at its core. It has 2.74 times the mass of the Sun but at the age of 575 million years, it has expanded to 13.41 times the radius of the Sun. It radiates 96 times the luminosity of the Sun from its enlarged photosphere at an effective temperature of 4,923 K. 7 LMi has a near solar metallicity at [Fe/H] = −0.03 and it spins very slowly with a projected rotational velocity of 0.24 km/s.

7 LMi has two visual companions. AG +33°954 is a background star located much farther away than 7 LMi and it is a close spectroscopic binary itself.

7 Leonis Minoris' companions
| Companion | Stellar classification | PA (deg) | Separation (arcsec) | Apparent magnitude |
|---|---|---|---|---|
| AG +33°954 (B) | G8 IV-V | 125 | 61.3 | 9.7 |
| C | G5 V | 217 | 95.9 | 11.6 |
