= 28 Leonis Minoris =

Star in the constellation Leo Minor

Observation data Epoch J2000.0 Equinox ICRS
- Constellation: Leo Minor
- Right ascension: 10^{h} 24^{m} 08.60391^{s}
- Declination: +33° 43′ 06.7069″
- Apparent magnitude (V): 5.50±0.01

Characteristics
- Evolutionary stage: red giant branch
- Spectral type: K1 III
- B−V color index: +1.18

Astrometry
Radial velocity (R_{v})	−24.3±0.2 km/s
Proper motion (μ)	RA: −14.460 mas/yr Dec.: −2.770 mas/yr
Parallax (π)	6.7945±0.091 mas
Distance	480 ± 6 ly (147 ± 2 pc)
Absolute magnitude (M_{V})	−0.05

Details
Mass	1.19 M_{☉}
Radius	22.6 R_{☉}
Luminosity	207 L_{☉}
Surface gravity (log g)	1.80 cgs
Temperature	4,580±122 K
Metallicity [Fe/H]	−0.04 dex
Age	202 Myr

Other designations
- 28 LMi, AG+33°1015, BD+34°2123, GC 14280, HD 90040, HIP 50935, HR 4081, SAO 62019

Database references
SIMBAD	data

28 Leonis Minoris (28 LMi) is a solitary, orange hued star located in the northern constellation Leo Minor, the lesser lion. It has an apparent magnitude of 5.5, allowing it to be faintly visible to the naked eye. Based on parallax measurements from the Gaia satellite, it is estimated to be 480 light years distant. 28 LMi is approaching the Solar System with a heliocentric radial velocity of −24 km/s. At its current distance, the star brightness is diminished by 0.14 magnitudes due to interstellar dust.

This is a population II giant star with a stellar classification of K1 III. It has a comparable mass to the Sun but has expanded to 22.6 times its girth. It radiates 207 times the luminosity of the Sun from its photosphere at an effective temperature of 4,580 K. It has an iron abundance 90% of the Sun's, making it slightly metal deficient.
