= 32 Leonis Minoris =

Star in the constellation Leo Minor

- Location of 32 LMi on the map (circled)

Observation data Epoch J2000.0 Equinox J2000.0 (ICRS)
- Constellation: Leo Minor
- Right ascension: 10^{h} 30^{m} 06.44761^{s}
- Declination: +38° 55′ 30.4758″
- Apparent magnitude (V): 5.78±0.01

Characteristics
- Evolutionary stage: subgiant
- Spectral type: A4 V or A4 III
- U−B color index: +0.14
- B−V color index: +0.07

Astrometry
Radial velocity (R_{v})	2±4.3 km/s
Proper motion (μ)	RA: −16.446 mas/yr Dec.: −4.506 mas/yr
Parallax (π)	4.4749±0.0527 mas
Distance	729 ± 9 ly (223 ± 3 pc)
Absolute magnitude (M_{V})	−1.02

Details
Mass	2.01±0.39 M_{☉}
Radius	6.58±0.33 R_{☉}
Luminosity	241^{+41}_{−35} L_{☉}
Surface gravity (log g)	3.07±0.37 cgs
Temperature	8,511^{+79}_{−78} K
Metallicity [Fe/H]	−0.80 dex
Rotational velocity (v sin i)	70±8 km/s
Age	465 Myr

Other designations
- 32 LMi, AG+39°1131, BD+39°2357, GC 14417, HD 90840, HIP 51420, HR 4113, SAO 62076

Database references
SIMBAD	data

32 Leonis Minoris (32 LMi), also known as HD 90840, is a solitary star located in the northern constellation Leo Minor. It is faintly visible to the naked eye as a white-hued point of light with an apparent magnitude of 5.78. The object is located relatively far at a distance of 729 light-years based on Gaia DR3 parallax measurements and it is currently receding with a heliocentric radial velocity of 2 km/s, which is somewhat constrained. At its current distance, 32 LMi's brightness is diminished by 0.14 magnitudes due to interstellar extinction and it has an absolute magnitude of −1.02.

The object has been given several stellar classifications over the years, ranging from main sequence (V) to giant star (III) and A1 to A4. Two of the classifications are A4 V and A4 III. It has 2.01 times the mass of the Sun but at the age of 465 million years, 32 LMi is now on the subgiant branch and it has expanded to 6.58 times the radius of the Sun. It radiates 241 times the luminosity of the Sun from its photosphere at an effective temperature of 8,511 K. 32 LMi is metal deficient with an iron abundance only 15.9% that of Sun ([Fe/H] = −0.80) and it spins modestly with a projected rotational velocity of 70 km/s.
