= 40 Leonis Minoris =

Binary star system in the constellation of Leo Minor

- Location of 40 LMi (circled)

Observation data Epoch J2000.0 Equinox ICRS
- Constellation: Leo Minor
- Right ascension: 10^{h} 43^{m} 01.88241^{s}
- Declination: +26° 19′ 32.0287″
- Apparent magnitude (V): 5.51±0.01

Characteristics
- Evolutionary stage: main sequence star
- Spectral type: A4 Vn
- U−B color index: +0.19
- B−V color index: +0.17

Astrometry
Radial velocity (R_{v})	10±4.3 km/s
Proper motion (μ)	RA: −98.971 mas/yr Dec.: −65.543 mas/yr
Parallax (π)	21.2215±0.0816 mas
Distance	153.7 ± 0.6 ly (47.1 ± 0.2 pc)
Absolute magnitude (M_{V})	+2.23

Details
Mass	1.69 M_{☉}
Radius	1.54±0.04 R_{☉}
Luminosity	14.3^{+1.8}_{−1.6} L_{☉}
Surface gravity (log g)	4.30±0.04 cgs
Temperature	7834±108 K
Metallicity [Fe/H]	−0.15 dex
Rotational velocity (v sin i)	211 km/s
Age	207 Myr

Other designations
- 14 H. Leonis Minoris, 40 LMi, AG+26°1125, BD+27°1927, GC 14730, HD 92769, HIP 52422, HR 4189, SAO 81485, WDS J10430+2620A

Database references
SIMBAD	data

40 Leonis Minoris (40 LMi) is a white hued star located in the northern constellation Leo Minor. It is rarely called 14 H. Leonis Minoris, which is the designation given by Polish astronomer Johann Hevelius.

It has an apparent magnitude of 5.51, making it faintly visible to the naked eye. The object is located relatively close at a distance of 154 light years based on Gaia DR3 parallax measurements but is receding with a somewhat constrained heliocentric radial velocity of 10 km/s. At 40 LMi's current distance, its brightness is diminished by only 0.02 magnitudes due to interstellar dust.

40 LMi is a chemically peculiar A-type main-sequence star with a stellar classification of A4 Vn. This indicates that it is an A4 dwarf with nebulous absorption lines due to rapid rotation. It has 1.69 times the mass of the Sun and 1.54 times its girth. It radiates 14.3 times the luminosity of the Sun from its photosphere at an effective temperature of 7,834 K. The star is estimated to be 207 million years old, having completed 54.6% of its main sequence lifetime. 40 LMi is slightly metal deficient and spins rapidly with a projected rotational velocity of 211 km/s.

This star was part of a 2005 survey regarding proper motions from the Hipparcos satellite. Its proper motion varied, indicating that an unseen companion may cause it. This led to Peter P. Eggleton and Andrei Tokovinin classifying it as an astrometric binary. There also 3 optical companions located near 40 LMi. Their relative positions and brightness are listed below.

40 Leonis Minoris' companions
Companion	m_{v}	PA (°)	Year	Sep. (″)
B	12.6	108	2015	23.8
C	13.5	72	2015	41.6
D	13	285	2015	46.6
