= 11 Leonis Minoris =

Star in the constellation Leo Minor

- Location of 11 Leonis Minoris (circled in red)

Observation data Epoch J2000 Equinox ICRS
- Constellation: Leo Minor
- Right ascension: 09^{h} 35^{m} 39.50219^{s}
- Declination: +35° 48′ 36.4770″
- Apparent magnitude (V): 5.54 + 14.0

Characteristics
- Evolutionary stage: main sequence
- Spectral type: G8V + M4
- Variable type: RS CVn

Astrometry
Radial velocity (R_{v})	+14.40 km/s
Proper motion (μ)	RA: −726.514 mas/yr Dec.: −259.057 mas/yr
Parallax (π)	89.0092±0.0937 mas
Distance	36.64 ± 0.04 ly (11.23 ± 0.01 pc)
Absolute magnitude (M_{V})	5.25±0.008

Orbit
Name	11 LMi B
Period (P)	201 yr
Semi-major axis (a)	3.84″
Eccentricity (e)	0.88
Inclination (i)	117°

Details

11 LMi A
Mass	0.936±0.015 M_{☉}
Radius	0.992±0.015 R_{☉}
Luminosity	0.783±0.013 L_{☉}
Surface gravity (log g)	4.44±0.02 cgs
Temperature	5,452±46 K
Metallicity [Fe/H]	0.34±0.02 dex
Rotation	18.0 days
Age	7.9 Gyr

11 LMi B
Mass	0.23 M_{☉}

Other designations
- 11 LMi, SV Leonis Minoris, BD+36°1979, GJ 356, HD 82885, HIP 47080, HR 3815, SAO 61586, WDS 09357+3549

Database references
SIMBAD	11 LMi A
- 11 LMi B
ARICNS	11 LMi A
- 11 LMi B

11 Leonis Minoris is a binary star located 36.64 light years away from Earth, in the northern constellation of Leo Minor. It is visible to the naked eye as a dim, yellow-hued star with an apparent visual magnitude of 5.54. The system is moving away from the Earth with a heliocentric radial velocity of +14.4 km/s. It has a relatively high proper motion, traversing the celestial sphere at the rate of 0.764 arc seconds per annum.

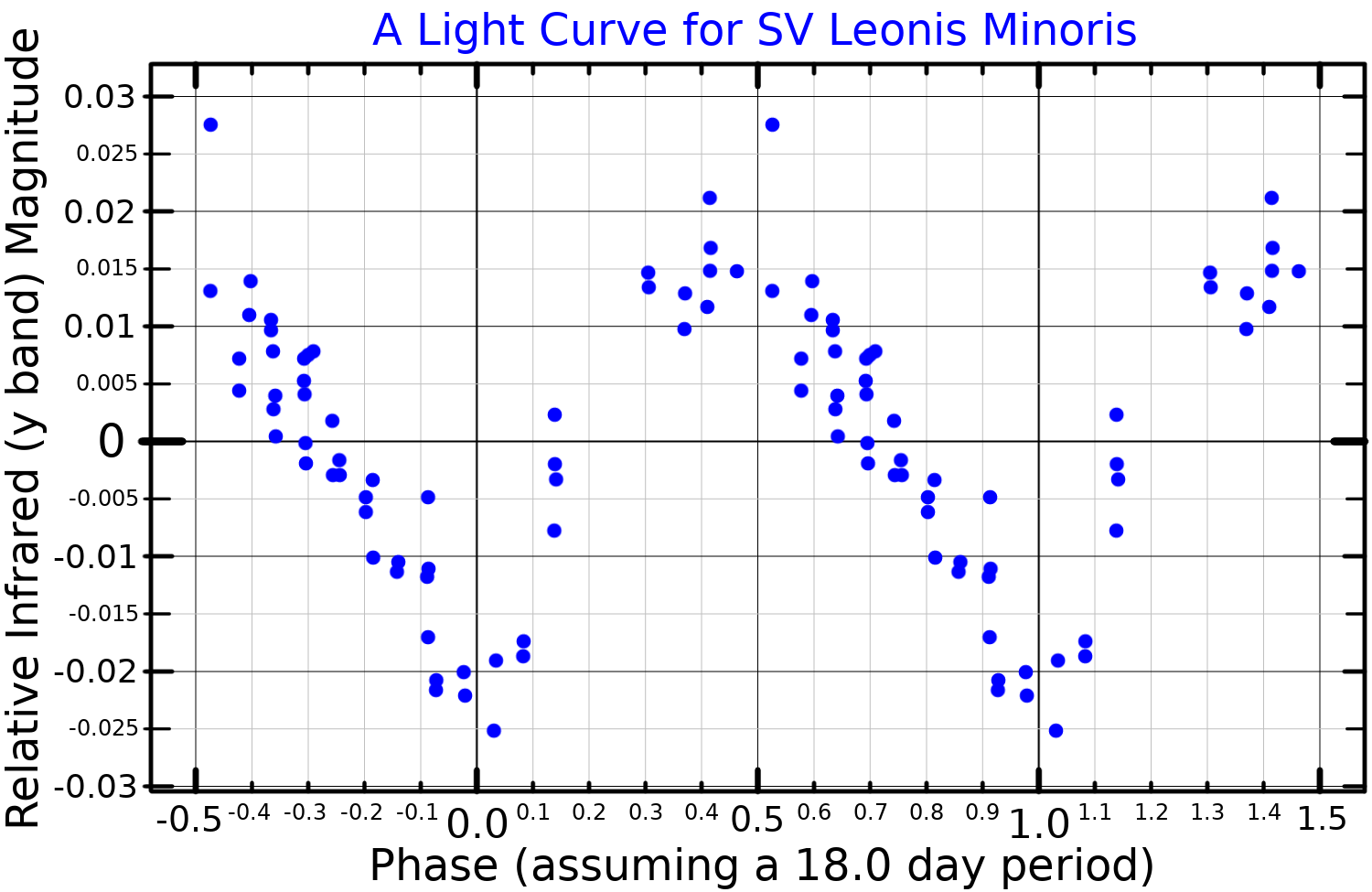
A y band light curve for SV Leonis Minoris, adapted from Skiff and Lockwood (1986)

The primary component is a G-type main-sequence star with a stellar classification of G8V, which is slightly less massive and slightly dimmer than the Sun. This is an RS Canum Venaticorum variable star with its luminosity varying by 0.033 magnitudes over a period of 18 days. Compared to the Sun, it has more than double the abundance of elements more massive than helium—what astronomers term the star's metallicity.

There is a secondary component, a 14th magnitude red dwarf star much dimmer than the primary. The pair have an orbital period of 201 years with a high eccentricity of 0.88.
