= 42 Leonis Minoris =

Star in the constellation Leo Minor

- Location of 42 Leo Minoris (circled)

Observation data Epoch J2000 Equinox ICRS
- Constellation: Leo Minor
- Right ascension: 10^{h} 45^{m} 51.8947^{s}
- Declination: +30° 40′ 56.307″
- Apparent magnitude (V): 5.35±0.01

Characteristics
- Evolutionary stage: main sequence
- Spectral type: B9 V
- U−B color index: −0.16
- B−V color index: −0.06

Astrometry
Radial velocity (R_{v})	12±3.7 km/s
Proper motion (μ)	RA: −20.344 mas/yr Dec.: −38.234 mas/yr
Parallax (π)	7.915±0.0813 mas
Distance	412 ± 4 ly (126 ± 1 pc)
Absolute magnitude (M_{V})	+0.02

Details
Mass	2.77±0.36 M_{☉}
Radius	3.29±0.11 R_{☉}
Luminosity	107 L_{☉}
Surface gravity (log g)	4±0.2 cgs
Temperature	10,703±206 K
Rotational velocity (v sin i)	145 km/s
Age	69^{+199}_{−59} Myr

Other designations
- 42 LMi, AG+30°1079, BD+31°2180, FK5 407, GC 14798, HD 93152, HIP 52638, HR 4203, SAO 62236

Database references
SIMBAD	data

42 Leonis Minoris (42 LMi) is a solitary, bluish-white hued star located in the northern constellation Leo Minor. It has a visual apparent magnitude of 5.35, allowing it to be faintly seen with the naked eye. Parallax measurements place it at a distance of 412 light years. The object has a heliocentric radial velocity of 12 km/s, indicating that it is drifting away from the Solar System.

42 LMi has a general stellar classification of B9 V, indicating that it is an ordinary B-type main-sequence star. However, Cowley et al. (1969) gave a slightly cooler class of A1 Vn, indicating that it is instead an A-type main-sequence star with 'nebulous' (broad) absorption lines due to rapid rotation. Nevertheless, it has 2.77 times the mass of the Sun and a radius of 3.3 R_{☉}. It radiates at 107 times the luminosity of the Sun from its photosphere at an effective temperature of 10,703 K. Its high luminosity and slightly enlarged diameter suggests that the object might be evolved. Like most hot stars, 42 LMi spins rapidly with a projected rotational velocity of 145 km/s.

There are two optical companions located near this star. BD+31°2181 is a 7th magnitude K2 giant star separated 146″ away along a position angle of 174°. An 8th magnitude companion has been detected at a distance of over 400 arcseconds along a position angle of 92°. Both have no relation to 42 LMi and is just moving with it by coincidence.

An X-ray emission with a luminosity of 278.2×10^{20} W has been detected around the object. A-type stars are not expected to emmit X-rays, so it must be coming from an unseen companion.
