= 20 Leonis Minoris =

Star in the constellation Leo Minor

- Location of 20 Leonis Minoris (circled in red)

Observation data Epoch J2000 Equinox ICRS
- Constellation: Leo Minor
- Right ascension: 10^{h} 01^{m} 00.65688^{s}
- Declination: +31° 55′ 25.2130″
- Apparent magnitude (V): +5.40

Characteristics
- Spectral type: G3 Va H_{δ}1 + M7 V
- U−B color index: +0.27
- B−V color index: +0.65

Astrometry
Radial velocity (R_{v})	+55.96±0.09 km/s
Proper motion (μ)	RA: −528.871(92) mas/yr Dec.: −429.376(74) mas/yr
Parallax (π)	66.9958±0.0921 mas
Distance	48.68 ± 0.07 ly (14.93 ± 0.02 pc)
Absolute magnitude (M_{V})	4.46

Details

20 LMi A
Mass	0.967±0.010 M_{☉}
Radius	1.237±0.019 R_{☉}
Luminosity	1.365±0.014 L_{☉}
Surface gravity (log g)	4.25±0.02 cgs
Temperature	5,735±5.6 K
Metallicity [Fe/H]	0.20±0.02 dex
Rotation	10.64±0.14 d
Rotational velocity (v sin i)	2.4±0.5 km/s
Age	6.2–7.7 Gyr

20 LMi B
Mass	0.11 M_{☉}
Temperature	3,106(54) K
Metallicity [Fe/H]	0.00(9) dex
Rotation	19.2687 d

Other designations
- 20 LMi, BD+32°1964, FK5 1258, GJ 376, HD 86728, HIP 49081, HR 3951, SAO 61808, LHS 2216, LTT 12671

Database references
SIMBAD	A
- B
Exoplanet Archive	data

20 Leonis Minoris is a binary star system in the northern constellation of Leo Minor. It is faintly visible to the naked eye, having an apparent visual magnitude of +5.4. Based upon an annual parallax shift of 66.996 mas, it is located 48.7 light-years from the Sun. The star has a relatively high proper motion and is moving away from the Sun with a radial velocity of +56 km/s. The system made its closest approach about 150,000 years ago when it came within 32.2 ly (9.86 pc).

The primary member of this system is a G-type main-sequence star with a stellar classification of G3 Va H_{δ}1. It has 12% more mass and a 25% larger radius than the Sun. The star is about seven billion years old and is spinning with a rotation period of 10.6 days. The small companion is an active red dwarf star that has a relatively high metallicity. The two stars are currently separated by 14.5 arc seconds, corresponding to a projected separation of 2016 AU.

== Planetary system ==
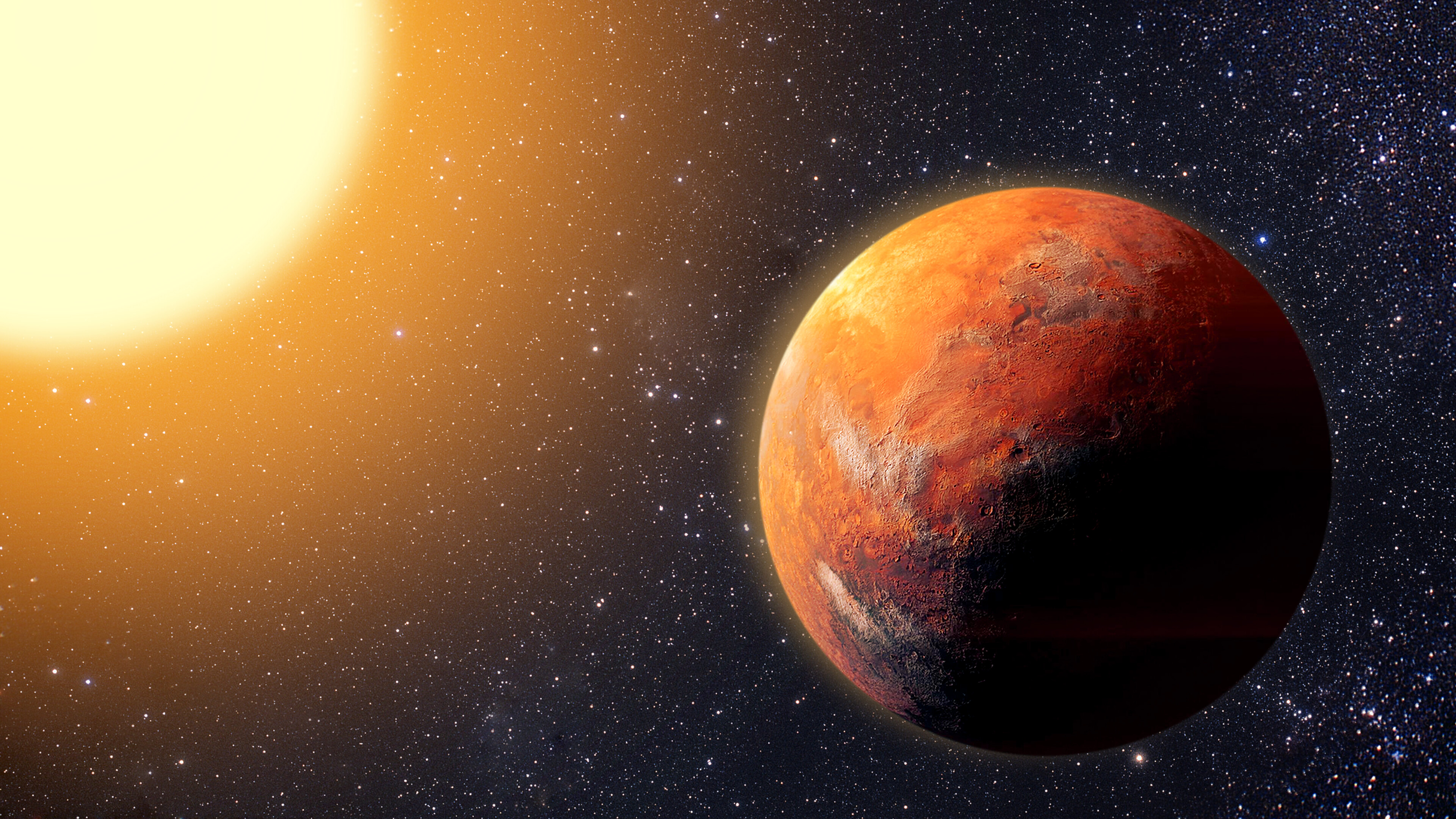
Artist's impression of 20 Leonis Minoris b orbiting its star.

A candidate exoplanet orbiting 20 Leonis Minoris A (HD 86728) was first detected in 2020, and confirmed in 2024 as the first discovery of the NEID Earth Twin Survey (NETS). With a minimum mass of 9.2 M_{🜨} and an orbital period of 31 days, this is most likely a hot Neptune-type planet.

The 20 Leonis Minoris A planetary system
Companion (in order from star)	Mass	Semimajor axis (AU)	Orbital period (days)	Eccentricity	Inclination (°)	Radius
b	≥9.16+0.55 −0.56 M_{🜨}	0.1916+0.00065 −0.00066	31.1503+0.0062 −0.0066	0.064+0.065 −0.044	—	—
