= 41 Leonis Minoris =

Star in the constellation Leo Minor

- Location of 41 Leonis Minoris (circled)

Observation data Epoch J2000 Equinox J2000
- Constellation: Leo Minor
- Right ascension: 10^{h} 43^{m} 24.95671^{s}
- Declination: +23° 11′ 18.2499″
- Apparent magnitude (V): 5.08

Characteristics
- Evolutionary stage: main sequence
- Spectral type: A3Vn
- U−B color index: +0.06
- B−V color index: +0.04

Astrometry
Radial velocity (R_{v})	+18.50 km/s
Proper motion (μ)	RA: −115.30 mas/yr Dec.: +7.62 mas/yr
Parallax (π)	14.23±0.25 mas
Distance	229 ± 4 ly (70 ± 1 pc)
Absolute magnitude (M_{V})	0.85

Details
Mass	2.47 M_{☉}
Radius	2.1 R_{☉}
Luminosity	55 L_{☉}
Surface gravity (log g)	3.95 cgs
Temperature	9,902 K
Metallicity [Fe/H]	−0.01 dex
Rotational velocity (v sin i)	201 km/s
Age	182 Myr

Other designations
- 41 LMi, BD+23°2253, GC 14740, HD 92825, HIP 52457, HR 4192, SAO 81490

Database references
SIMBAD	data

41 Leonis Minoris is a single star in the northern constellation Leo Minor, located near the southern border with the neighboring constellation of Leo. It is visible to the naked eye as a dim, white-hued star with an apparent visual magnitude of 5.08. This object is located approximately 229 light years away from the Sun, based on parallax, and is drifting further away with a radial velocity of +18.5 km/s.

This is an ordinary A-type main-sequence star with a stellar classification of A3Vn, where the 'n' suffix indicates "nebulous" (broadened) lines due to rapid rotation. It is about 182 million years old with a high projected rotational velocity of 201 km/s. The star has 2.5 times the mass of the Sun and 2.1 times the Sun's radius. It is radiating 55 times the luminosity of the Sun from its photosphere at an effective temperature of 9,902 K.
