= 8 Leonis Minoris =

Star in the constellation of Leo Minor

- Location of 8 Leonis Minoris (circled)

Observation data Epoch J2000.0 Equinox J2000.0 (ICRS)
- Constellation: Leo Minor
- Right ascension: 09^{h} 31^{m} 32.41045^{s}
- Declination: +35° 06′ 11.7793″
- Apparent magnitude (V): 5.37

Characteristics
- Evolutionary stage: AGB
- Spectral type: M1 IIIab
- U−B color index: +1.81
- B−V color index: +1.53
- Variable type: suspected

Astrometry
Radial velocity (R_{v})	39.83±0.18 km/s
Proper motion (μ)	RA: −54.488 mas/yr Dec.: −97.434 mas/yr
Parallax (π)	6.6271±0.0238 mas
Distance	492 ± 2 ly (150.9 ± 0.5 pc)
Absolute magnitude (M_{V})	−0.43

Details
Mass	1.59 M_{☉}
Radius	48.5 R_{☉}
Luminosity	417±17 L_{☉}
Surface gravity (log g)	1.153 cgs
Temperature	3,978±122 K
Metallicity [Fe/H]	−0.25 dex

Other designations
- 8 Leonis Minoris, AG+35°938, BD+35°2015, GC 13133, HD 82198, HIP 46735, HR 3769, SAO 61450

Database references
SIMBAD	data

8 Leonis Minoris (8 LMi) is a solitary, red hued star located in the northern constellation Leo Minor. It has an apparent magnitude 5.37, making it faintly visible to the naked eye. Based on parallax measurements from the Gaia satellite, the object is estimated to be 492 light years distant. It is receding with a heliocentric radial velocity of 40 km/s. At its current distance, 8 LMi is diminished by 0.12 magnitudes due to interstellar dust.

This is an asymptotic giant branch star with stellar classification of M1 IIIab. It has 1.59 times the mass of the Sun but has expanded to 48.5 times its girth. It radiates 417 times the luminosity of the Sun from its enlarged photosphere at an effective temperature of 3,978 K. 8 LMi has an iron abundance only half of the Sun's, making it metal deficient.

8 LMi's variability was first observed to be variable in 1930 by Joel Stebbins. However, Eggen (1967) instead lists it as an ordinary M-type giant and used the object for comparison. In 1978-9, 8 LMi was again listed as a variable star but did not provide further insight. As of 2017, the star has not been confirmed to be variable.
