= 19 Leonis Minoris =

Spectroscopic binary in the constellation Leo Minor

- Location of 19 LMi (circled)

Observation data Epoch J2000.0 Equinox ICRS
- Constellation: Leo Minor
- Right ascension: 09^{h} 57^{m} 41.0544^{s}
- Declination: +41° 03′ 20.275″
- Apparent magnitude (V): 5.10±0.01

Characteristics
- Evolutionary stage: main sequence
- Spectral type: F6 V
- U−B color index: 0.00
- B−V color index: +0.46

Astrometry
Radial velocity (R_{v})	−8.6±2.6 km/s
Proper motion (μ)	RA: −116.432 mas/yr Dec.: −25.860 mas/yr
Parallax (π)	34.5809±0.0926 mas
Distance	94.3 ± 0.3 ly (28.92 ± 0.08 pc)
Absolute magnitude (M_{V})	+2.86

Orbit
Period (P)	9.2835 d
Eccentricity (e)	0.048
Periastron epoch (T)	2,443,858.21 JD
Argument of periastron (ω) (primary)	351°
Semi-amplitude (K_{1}) (primary)	18.9 km/s
Semi-amplitude (K_{2}) (secondary)	25.3 km/s

Details

A
Mass	1.29±0.19 M_{☉}
Radius	2±0.1 R_{☉}
Luminosity	6.41±0.04 L_{☉}
Surface gravity (log g)	3.98±0.03 cgs
Temperature	6,483±80 K
Metallicity [Fe/H]	+0.09 dex
Rotational velocity (v sin i)	5 km/s
Age	2.474 Gyr

B
Mass	1.01 M_{☉}

Other designations
- 19 LMi, AG+41°966, BD+41°2033, FK5 374, GC 13700, GJ 3574, HD 86146, HIP 48833, HR 3928, SAO 43115

Database references
SIMBAD	data

19 Leonis Minoris (19 LMi) is a spectroscopic binary located in the northern constellation Leo Minor. It has an apparent magnitude of 5.1, making it one of the brighter members of the constellation. The system is relatively close at a distance of 94 light years but is drifting closer with a heliocentric radial velocity of 8.6 km/s.

This spectroscopic binary can be classified as single lined because only the primary's spectrum can be observed clearly, with it having a stellar classification of F6 V. This makes it an ordinary F-type main-sequence star. The companion is probably a G-type main-sequence star of G0, having a mass 101% that of the Sun. The pair have a relatively circular orbit of about 9 days.

19 LMi has 129% the mass of the Sun and an effective temperature of 6,483 K, giving a yellow white hue. The object is somewhat evolved at an age of 2.5 billion years, having a slightly enlarged radius of 2 R_{☉} and a luminosity of 6.4 L_{☉}, high for its class. 19 LMi has an iron abundance 123% that of the Sun, making it slightly metal enriched. It spins modestly with a projected rotational velocity of 5 km/s.
