= 34 Leonis Minoris =

Star in the constellation Leo Minor

- Location of 34 LMi on the map (circled)

Observation data Epoch J2000.0 Equinox J2000.0 (ICRS)
- Constellation: Leo Minor
- Right ascension: 10^{h} 33^{m} 30.91104^{s}
- Declination: +34° 59′ 19.3006″
- Apparent magnitude (V): 5.58±0.01

Characteristics
- Evolutionary stage: subgiant
- Spectral type: A2 V
- U−B color index: +0.04
- B−V color index: +0.02

Astrometry
Radial velocity (R_{v})	7±10 km/s
Proper motion (μ)	RA: −28.397 mas/yr Dec.: −3.072 mas/yr
Parallax (π)	6.3892±0.0706 mas
Distance	510 ± 6 ly (157 ± 2 pc)
Absolute magnitude (M_{V})	−1.02

Details
Mass	2.40±0.42 M_{☉}
Radius	4.85±0.25 R_{☉}
Luminosity	323^{+54}_{−46} L_{☉}
Surface gravity (log g)	3.50±0.25 cgs
Temperature	9,333^{+152}_{−149} K
Metallicity [Fe/H]	−0.03 dex
Rotational velocity (v sin i)	165±8 km/s
Age	406^{+134}_{−172} Myr

Other designations
- 11 H. Leonis Minoris, 34 LMi, AG+35°1020, BD+35°2154, GC 14501, HD 91365, HIP 51685, HR 4137, SAO 62121

Database references
SIMBAD	data

34 Leonis Minoris (34 LMi), also known as HD 91365 or 11 H. Leonis Minoris is a solitary star located in the northern constellation Leo Minor. It is faintly visible to the naked eye as a white-hued point of light with an apparent magnitude of 5.58. Gaia DR3 parallax measurements imply a distance of 510 light-years, and it is currently receding with a poorly constrained heliocentric radial velocity of 7 km/s. At its current distance, 34 LMi's brightness is diminished by interstellar extinction of 0.16 magnitudes and it has an absolute magnitude of −1.02.

The object has received several stellar classifications over the years. Most sources generally agree that it is an early A-type main-sequence star with the classes ranging from A0 to A2. Anne Cowley and colleagues found that 34 LMi has broad or nebulous absorption lines in its spectrum, which could be a result of rapid rotation. However, D. R. Palmer gave a class of A0 IV, indicating that it is an evolved A-type subgiant. Richard O. Gray and Robert F. Garrison found a class of A1 III-IV, indicating that it has a luminosity class intermediate between a subgiant and giant star.

34 LMi has 2.4 times the mass of the Sun and an enlarged radius of 4.85 R_{☉}. It radiates 323 times the luminosity of the Sun from its photosphere at an effective temperature of 9,333 K. At the age of 406 million years 34 LMi is 1.9% past its main sequence lifetime, meaning that it has evolved to the subgiant branch. The star has a near-solar metallicity at [Fe/H] = −0.03 (93% solar). Like many hot stars 34 LMi spins rapidly, having a projected rotational velocity of 165 km/s.
