= 38 Leonis Minoris =

Star in the constellation Leo Minor

Observation data Epoch J2000.0 Equinox ICRS
- Constellation: Leo Minor
- Right ascension: 10^{h} 39^{m} 07.63230^{s}
- Declination: +37° 54′ 36.0041″
- Apparent magnitude (V): 5.84

Characteristics
- Evolutionary stage: subgiant
- Spectral type: G0 IV
- B−V color index: 0.595±0.003

Astrometry
Radial velocity (R_{v})	+30.9±0.3 km/s
Proper motion (μ)	RA: −220.689 mas/yr Dec.: −45.256 mas/yr
Parallax (π)	19.7987±0.0708 mas
Distance	164.7 ± 0.6 ly (50.5 ± 0.2 pc)
Absolute magnitude (M_{V})	2.26

Orbit
Period (P)	7.7991499±0.0000037 d
Eccentricity (e)	0.023±0.034
Periastron epoch (T)	20,165.164±1.470 HJD
Argument of periastron (ω) (secondary)	285.56±68.51°
Semi-amplitude (K_{1}) (primary)	24.10±0.73 km/s

Details

38 LMi A
Mass	1.68 M_{☉}
Luminosity	11.32 L_{☉}
Surface gravity (log g)	3.73 cgs
Temperature	6,106 K
Metallicity [Fe/H]	+0.32 dex
Rotational velocity (v sin i)	14.5±1.0 km/s
Age	2.03±0.14 Gyr

38 LMi B
Mass	≥ 0.31 M_{☉}

Other designations
- 38 LMi, BD+38° 2166, FK5 2852, HD 92168, HIP 52139, HR 4168, SAO 62178

Database references
SIMBAD	data

38 Leonis Minoris is a binary star system in the northern constellation of Leo Minor. It shines with a combined light of apparent magnitude 5.84, which indicates it a dimly visible to the naked eye under good viewing conditions. An annual parallax shift of 19.8 mas provides a distance estimate of around 165 light years. It has a relatively high proper motion, traversing the celestial sphere at a rate of 0.226 arcseconds per year, and is moving away from the Sun with a radial velocity of +31 km/s.

This is a single-lined spectroscopic binary with an orbital period of 7.8 days and a low eccentricity of 0.023 – nearly circular. The visible component has a stellar classification of G0 IV, matching a G-type subgiant star that is exhausting the hydrogen at its core and evolving into a giant. It is about two billion years old with 1.68 times the mass of the Sun and is spinning with a projected rotational velocity of 14.5 km/s. The star has a higher than solar abundance of iron in its spectrum. It is radiating 11 times the Sun's luminosity from its photosphere at an effective temperature of 6,106 K.
